= St. Paul's Church, Ardmore =

Small 19th century church in Ardmore, Ireland

St. Paul's Church
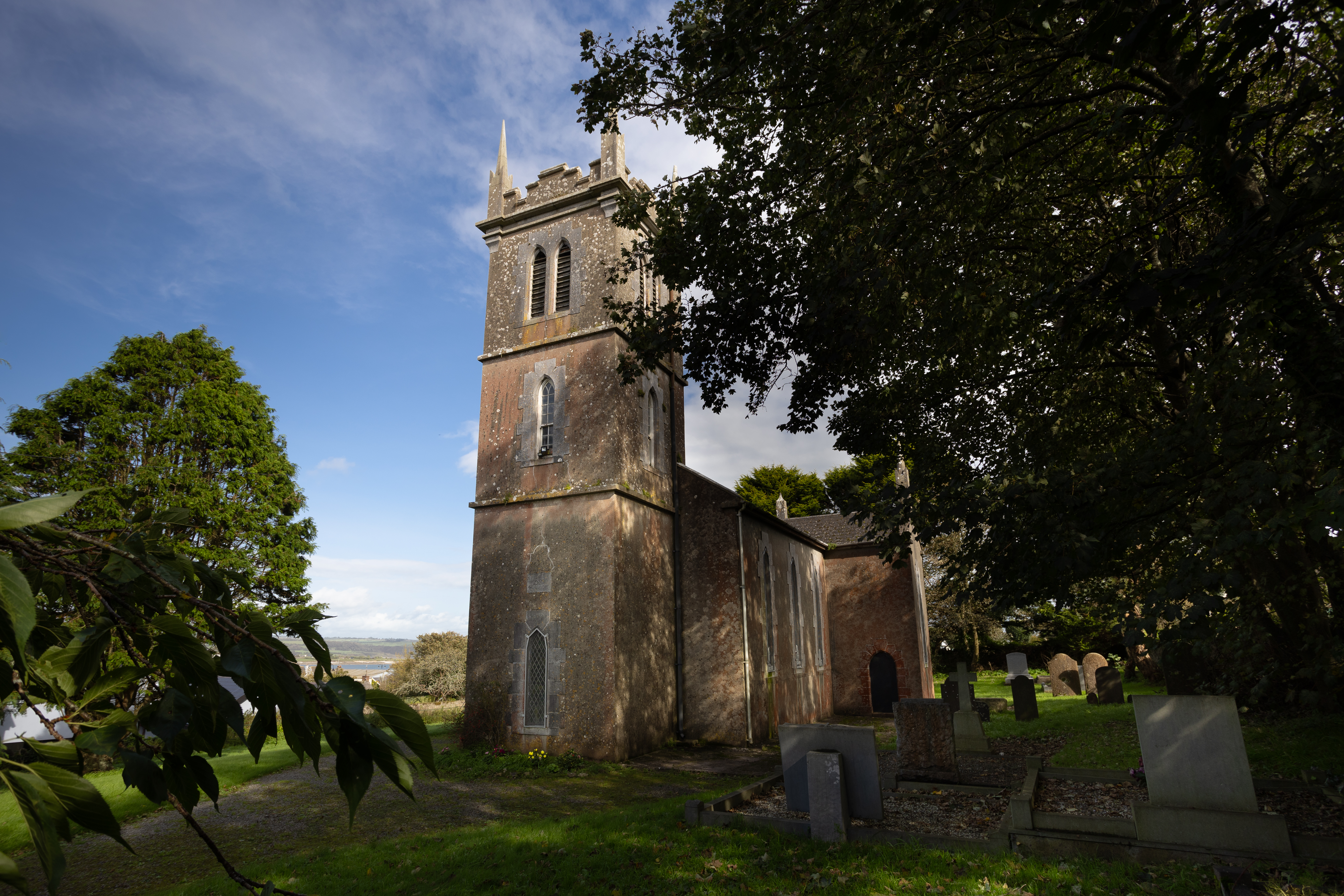
- St. Paul's Church and the adjoining graveyard
- St. Paul's Church
- 51.95007°N 7.72511°W
- Location: Ardmore
- Country: Ireland
- Denomination: Church of Ireland

History
- Founded: 1838
- Dedication: Paul the Apostle

Architecture
- Functional status: active

Specifications
- Materials: limestone, rubble stone

Administration
- Parish: Youghal Union of Parishes

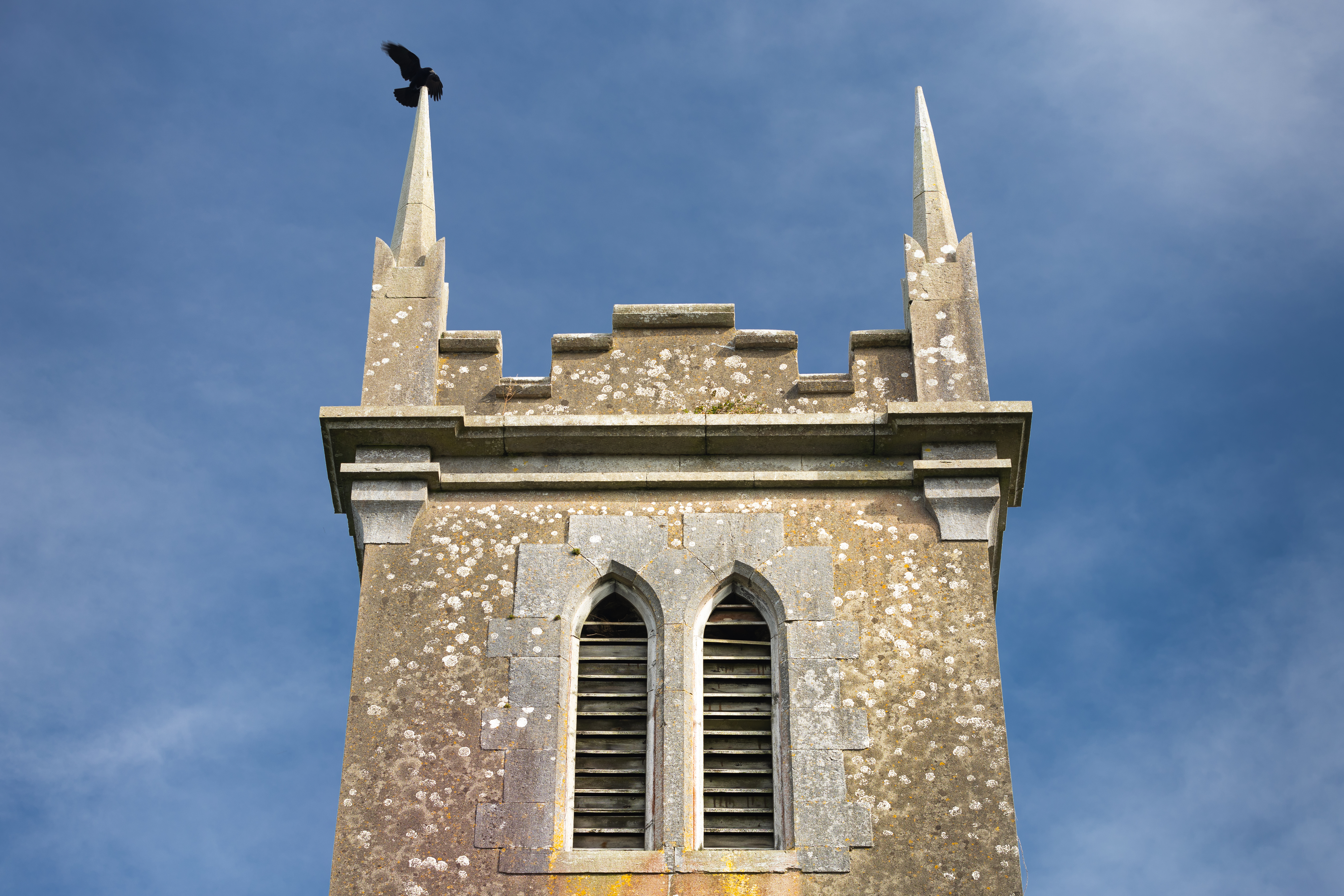
Church tower with pronounced pinnacles

St. Paul's Church is a small Church of Ireland church located in the seaside village of Ardmore, County Waterford in Ireland. Built between 1835 and 1840 (and dated 1838 by the incision on the tower), it is situated on a hill overlooking the town, but not as far up the hill as Ardmore's St. Declan's Monastery ruins.

The church is built on a cross plan, with a three-storey tower facing the front and adorned with four pinnacles. The church's octagonal font is said to reach back to the 16th century, and came from Declan's cathedral. In the church, there is also a silver chalice dated 1726, restored to the church by the antiquarian Robert Day after it had disappeared from the church. The church was consecrated on 15 September 1841.

The church is included in the Record of Protected Structures maintained by Waterford City and County Council.

== Restoration campaign ==
In 1988, the 150th anniversary of the church, a campaign was organised to raise funds for repairs, as there was an urgent need to replace roof slates, woodwork, and to renovate the outside. The campaign, which had a target of £28,000, was a cross-denominational effort, as there were only three Church of Ireland families living in the town at that time. One of these families was that of Molly Keane who, in 1996, was buried in the church's adjoining graveyard.

The fundraising received support from the RTÉ personality Donncha Ó Dúlaing who, sponsored by Waterford dairy cooperative, walked from Cork's St Anne's Church to the Ardmore church where he was welcomed by a large crowd of people. The cause was also supported by flower clubs from around the country which organised a flower festival on the church's grounds to coincide with Donncha's arrival.
