= Ardmore, County Waterford =

Seaside resort in County Waterford, Ireland

Ardmore Aird Mhór
- Village
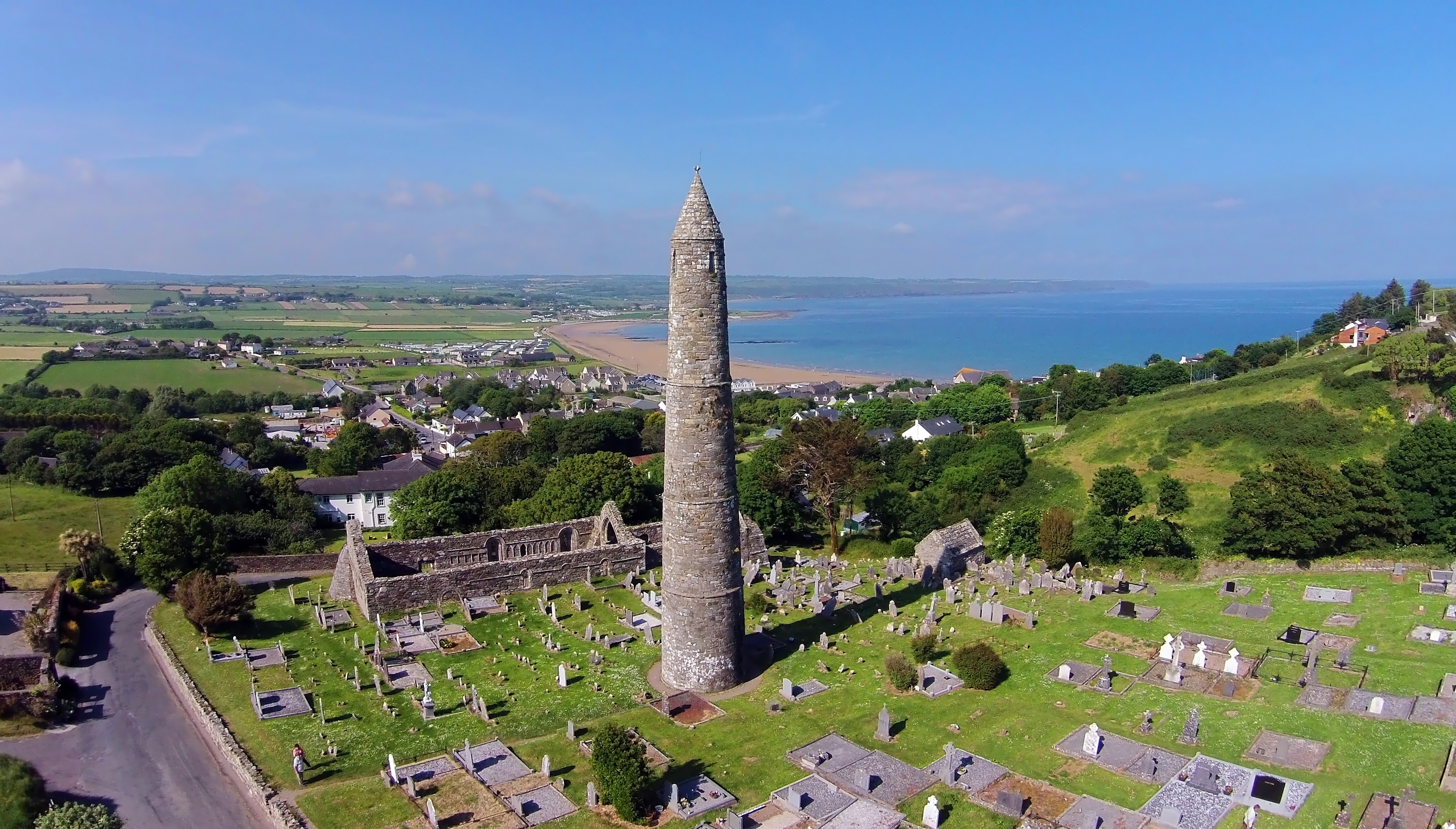
- St. Declan's Round Tower and Oratory with Ardmore in the background

- Location in Ireland
- Coordinates: 51°57′04″N 7°43′18″W
- Country: Ireland
- Province: Munster
- County: County Waterford

Population (2022)
  - Total: 468
- Time zone: UTC+0 (WET)
  - Summer (DST): UTC-1 (IST (WEST))
- Irish Grid Reference: X188776

Ardmore (Irish: Aird Mhór, meaning 'great height') is a seaside resort and fishing village in County Waterford, Ireland, not far from Youghal on the south coast of Ireland. The village is in a civil parish of the same name. As of the 2022 census, the village had a population of 468. Ardmore is believed to be the oldest Christian settlement in Ireland. According to tradition, Saint Declan lived in the region in the early 5th century, and Christianised the area before the coming of Saint Patrick.

In September 2014, Ardmore was included on a shortlist of Ireland's top tourist towns composed by Fáilte Ireland. It is home to the Michelin-starred restaurant, The House, at the Cliff House Hotel.

== History ==
=== Ecclesiastical history ===
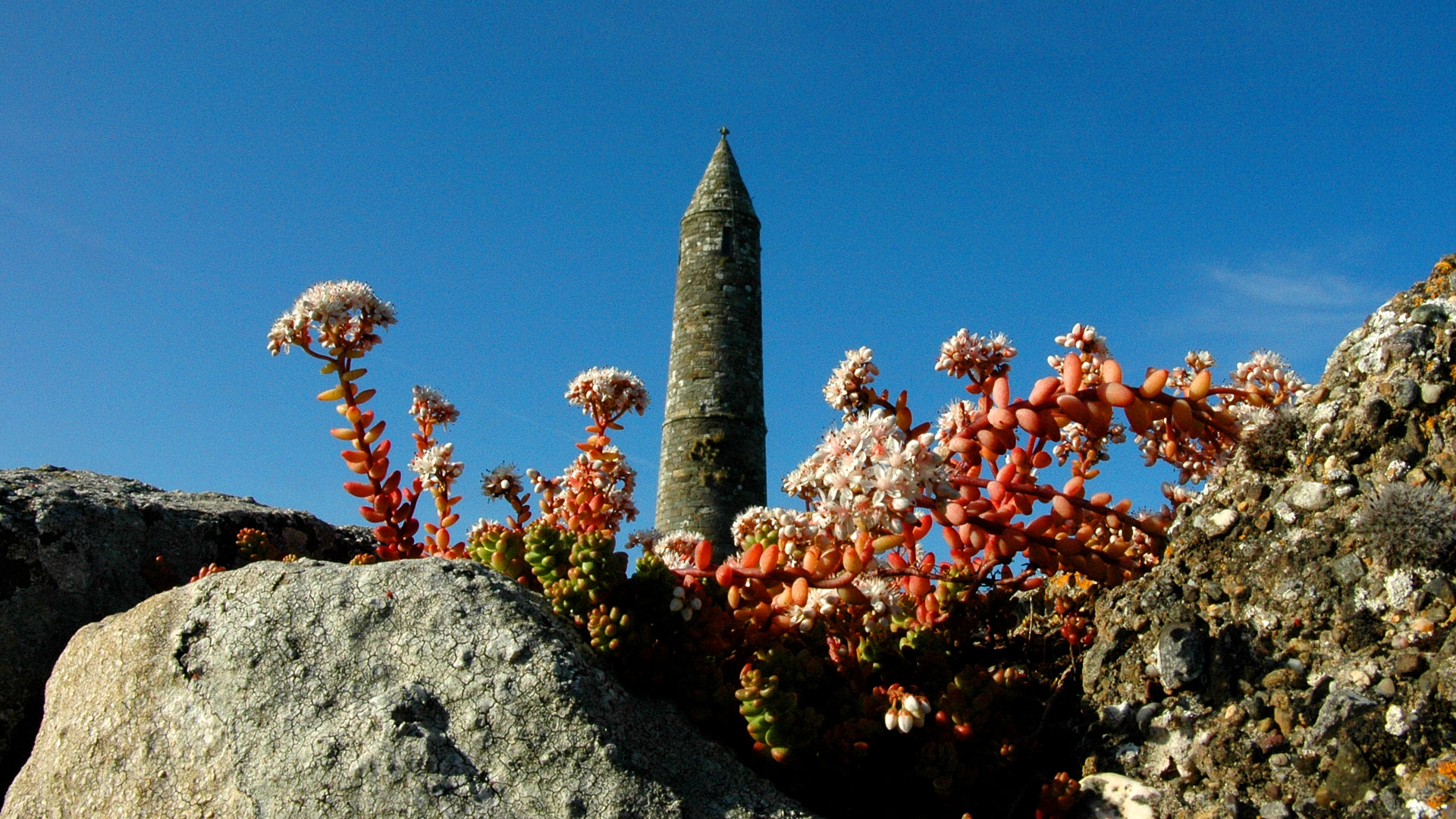
Ardmore Tower

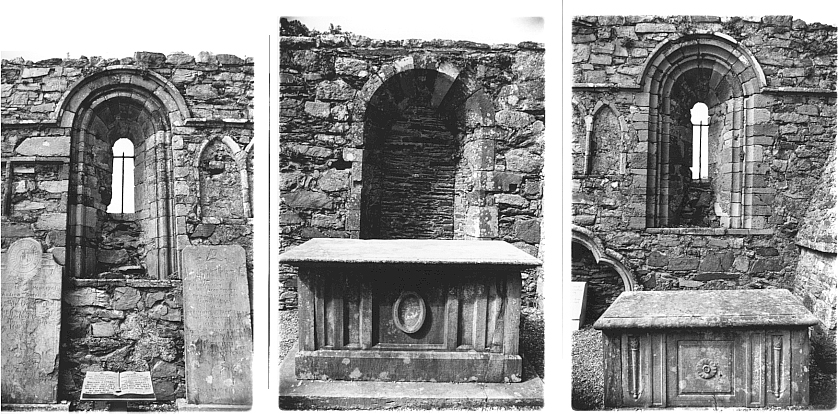
Interior of Ardmore Cathedral

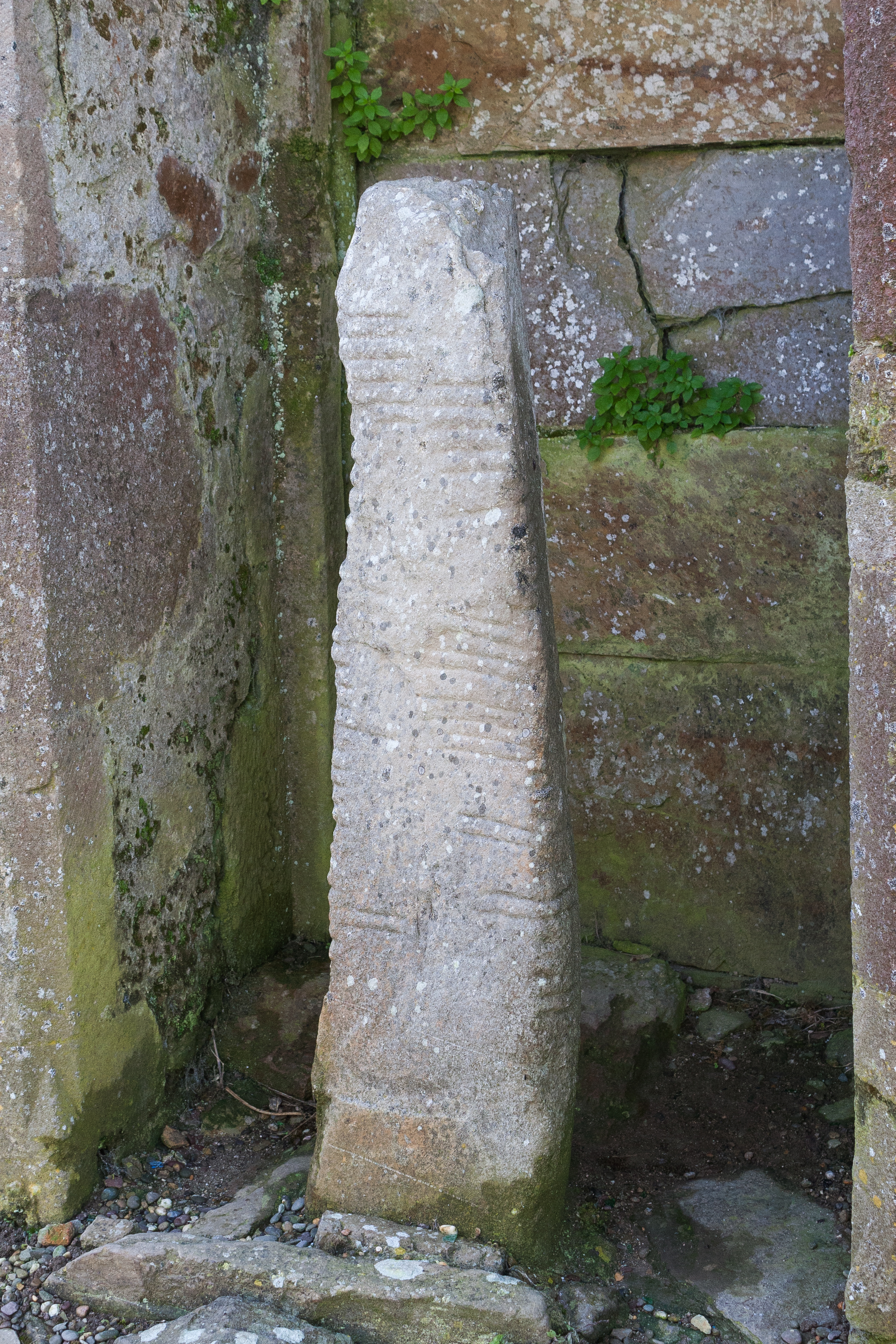
Ogham stone in the cathedral

Ardmore is associated with a 5th-century saint, Declán of Ardmore, who is reputed to have founded a monastery in the area. Declan, regarded as a patron saint of the Déisi of East Munster, is one of several Munster saints said to have preceded Saint Patrick in bringing Christianity to Ireland. A new church, replacing an older oratory, was built at St. Declan's Monastery in the 9th century.

At the Synod of Rathbreasail in 1111, recognition was given to the Diocese of Ardmore. A bishop of Ardmore swore fealty to Henry II of England at Cashel, as a suffragan of its archbishop, in 1171. The last reference to an independent bishop of Ardmore dates to 1210, when Innocent III listed it as one of Cashel's eleven suffragan dioceses.

No longer a residential bishopric, Árd Mór is today listed by the Catholic Church as a titular see.

The parish, now called that of 'Ardmore and Grange', is in the Roman Catholic Diocese of Waterford and Lismore. St. Paul's Church, Ardmore, an old Church of Ireland church in the village, is part of the parish of Youghal.

=== Ecclesiastical ruins ===
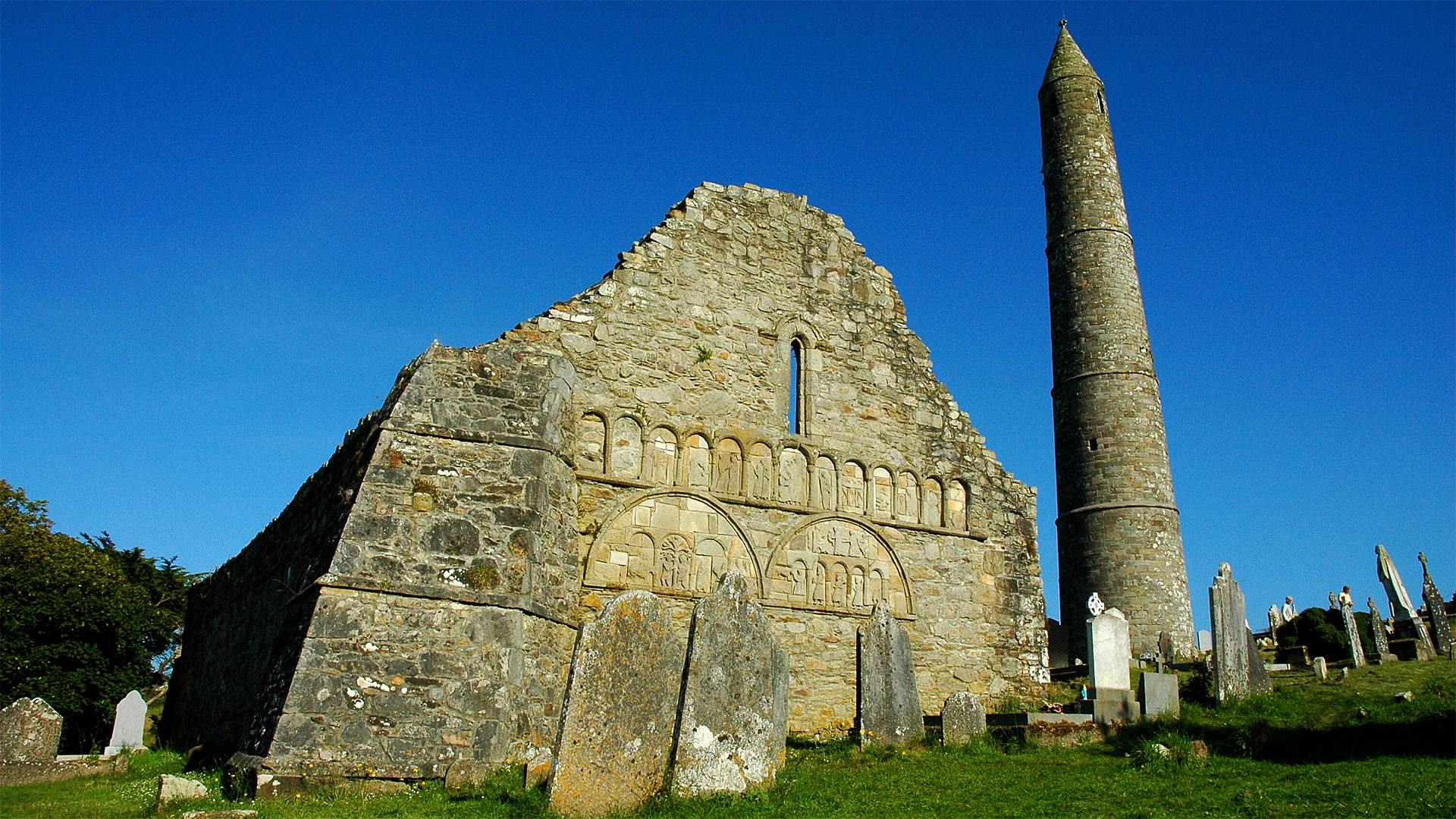
Old Cathedral

On a hill above the village is a well-preserved 30-m-high, 12th-century round tower and the ruins of a cathedral dating from the 12th and 13th centuries with an adjacent 8th-century oratory. One of the outer walls of the cathedral features some stone carvings retrieved from an earlier 9th-century building. The carvings include a very early image of a harp, images of Adam and Eve in the garden and a representation of "Solomon's judgement". The cathedral also contains two Ogham stones, which rest in small alcoves. Some elements of the original structure can still be seen within the building. The present Church of Ireland church is close to this complex.

=== Maritime history ===
Within the last few decades, Ardmore has lost its status as a fishing village as fishing laws became more restrictive. Harbour development remains unfunded and larger fishing vessels are unable to utilise the present docking facilities due to a lack of water depth. However, a small number of fishermen maintain some of the old fishing practices as they continue to fish from Ardmore.

The Samson, a crane ship, was wrecked on Ram Head, near the village, during a December storm in 1987 as it was being towed from Liverpool to Malta. Its wreck is now a diving spot. There are many other older wrecks in the bay area including the Marechal de Noailles, Bandon, Peri, Scotland, Sextusa and Peg Tranton, and later wrecks including Anne Sophie and Fee des Ondes. The remaining keel of the latter wreck may still be seen at low tide on the main beach.

== Features ==
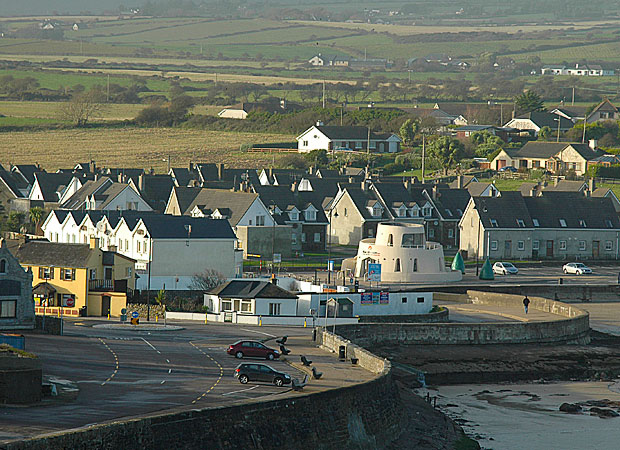
Ardmore village and waterfront

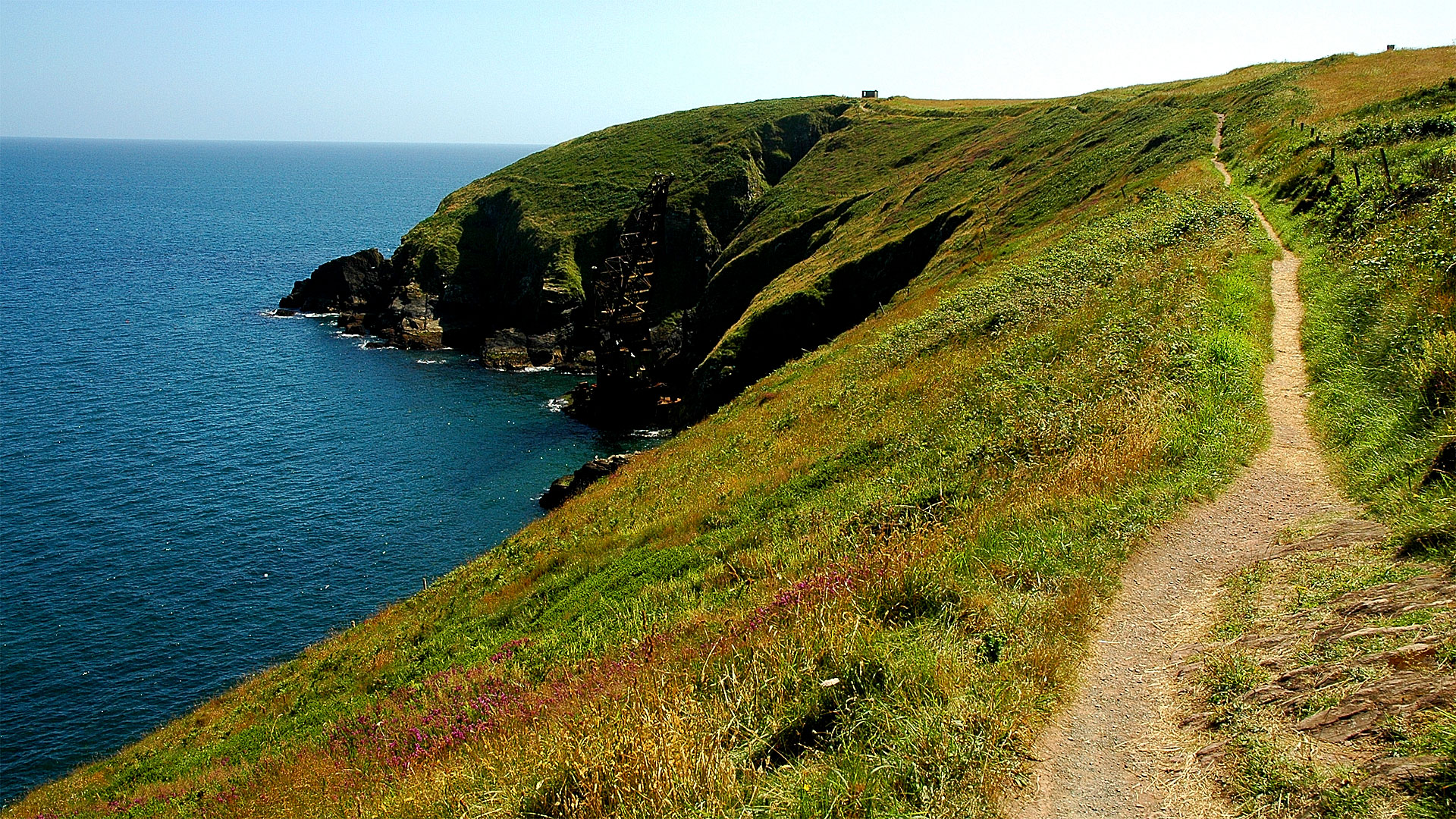
Ardmore peninsula

The village includes two hotels, a number of pubs and restaurants, a seasonal petrol station, a pier and slipway, and one store. There are also several sports clubs and a primary school. The village was the overall winner of the Irish Tidy Towns Competition in 1992.

Ardmore is a seaside resort with a mile-long beach, commonly termed the Main Beach. Other nearby beaches include Goat Island, Ballyquin, the Curragh, and Whiting Bay. Ardmore's main beach was awarded Blue Flag beach status in 2018. Improvements in water quality at the beach were attributed to a wastewater treatment plant which was opened in 2015. As of 2020, the beach retained its Blue Flag status.

In 2006 a new hotel, the Cliff House Hotel, was opened in place of the older Cliff Hotel. There is a cliff path, beginning near this hotel, and ending back in the main street. The cliff walk, which has marker posts erected along the route, passes an old remodeled Coastguard Station, St Declan's Cell and Holy Well, a ruined church, the wreck of the Samson, an abandoned 20th century coast guard lookout, and another, much older, lookout tower. Further along the walk is a well with stone canopy, known as Fr. O'Donnells Well. The monastic complex is atop the hill above the village.

== Transport ==
Ardmore is served on a daily basis by Bus Éireann route 260 which links it to, inter alia, Youghal, Midleton and Cork city. Until 2010 it was also served by route 362 which linked it to Waterford via Dungarvan.

== Sport ==
The local Gaelic Athletic Association club is Ardmore GAA. The area is also home to a watersports centre, an association football (soccer) club, and a juvenile athletics club.

== People ==
- Molly Keane (1904–1996), novelist, lived in Ardmore for many years and was buried there. Her home is now a writers' retreat.
- Séamus Prendergast and Declan Prendergast, Waterford hurlers
- Nora Roberts, American novelist, has based three of her books in Ardmore, making it a destination for American tourists.
- Claud Cockburn, British journalist, moved to Ardmore in 1947.
- Olivia Wilde, Cockburn's granddaughter and actress, spent summers in Ardmore during her childhood.

== See also ==
- List of towns and villages in Ireland
