= Samson (crane barge) =

Derelict crane barge

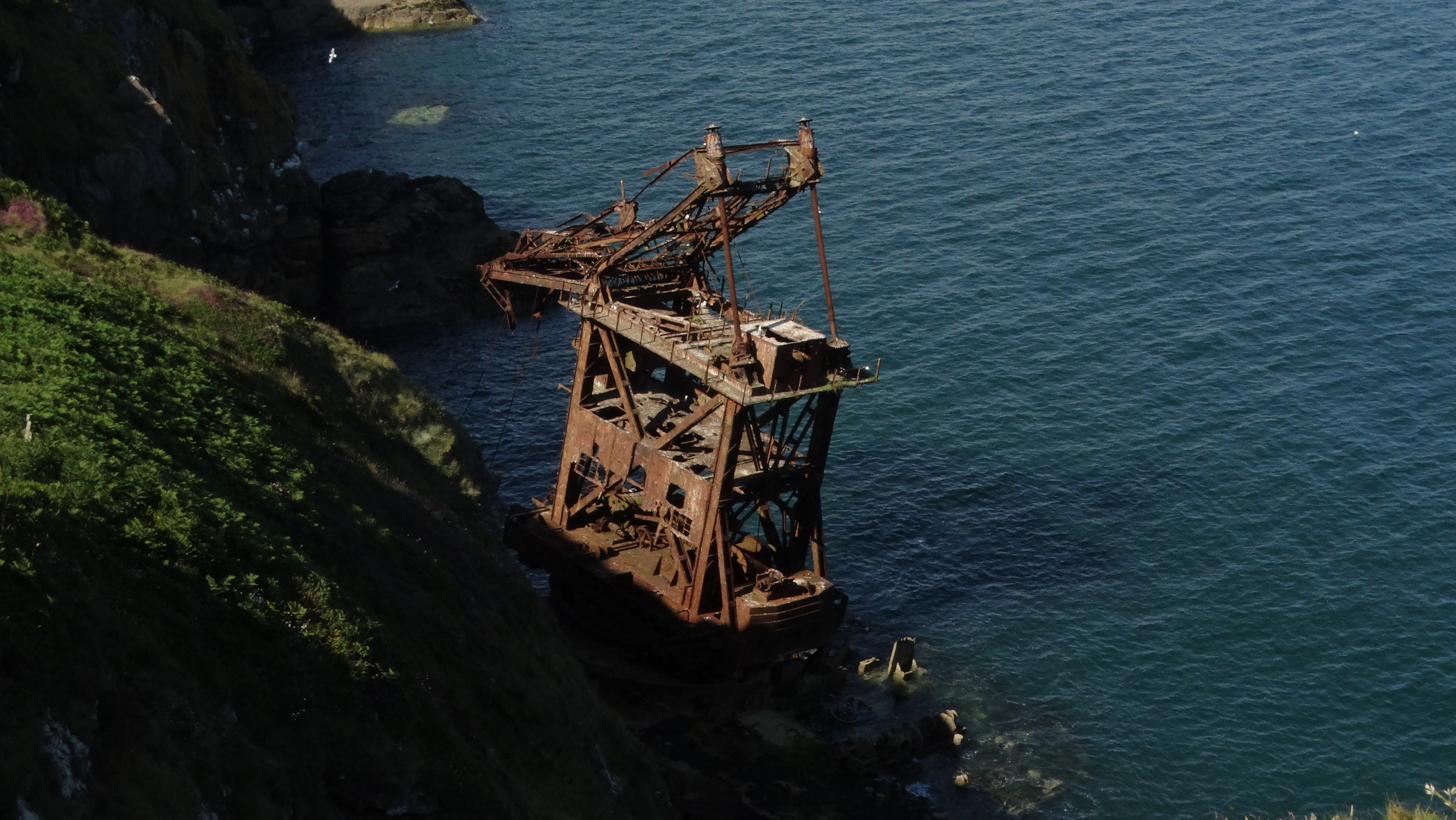
- Samson in July 2017

History

United Kingdom
- Name: Samson
- Operator: Mersey Docks & Harbour Board
- Port of registry: Malta
- Route: UK
- Builder: Lobnitz & Company
- Completed: 1959
- Fate: Shipwreck at 51°56′36″N 7°42′33″W

Malta
- Name: Samson
- Identification: IMO number: 5308988

General characteristics
- Tonnage: 974 tonnes
- Length: 54.86 m (180 ft 0 in)
- Beam: 17.51 m (57 ft 5 in)
- Installed power: 1,748 bhp
- Propulsion: 2 × Paxman 12YLX diesel generators
- Crew: 2 (minimum)

Samson was a crane barge which ran aground off the coast of Ireland in 1987.

Samson had left Liverpool on 9 December 1987, bound for Valletta, Malta. Though the barge was initially being towed by a tugboat, the towline parted in near gale force conditions while off the Welsh coast early on 11 December. The two men aboard the barge were rescued by an RAF Sea King flying from RAF Brawdy, after attempts to reconnect the tow line failed.

The barge eventually ran aground at Rams Head, Ardmore, County Waterford, at approximately 7.50 am on 12 December. Dangerous pollutants were removed soon after the barge went aground, but despite questions being raised in the Dáil Éireann, the wrecked barge was not salvaged and remains in situ. The ships' propeller was removed and put on display in the village of Ardmore.

In April 2016 the entire jib collapsed into the sea.

== Gallery ==
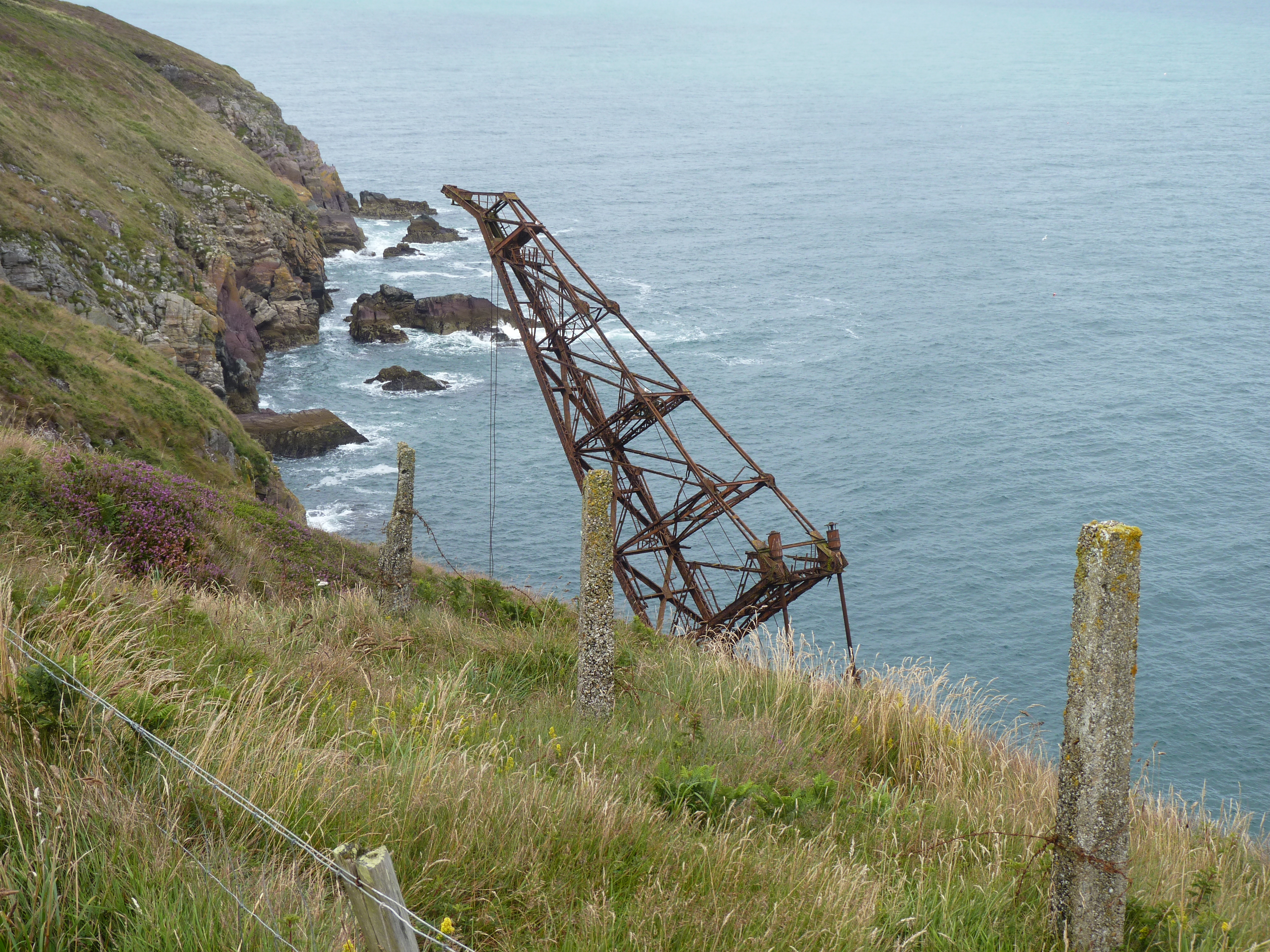
The Samson, seen from the cliffs at Rams Head

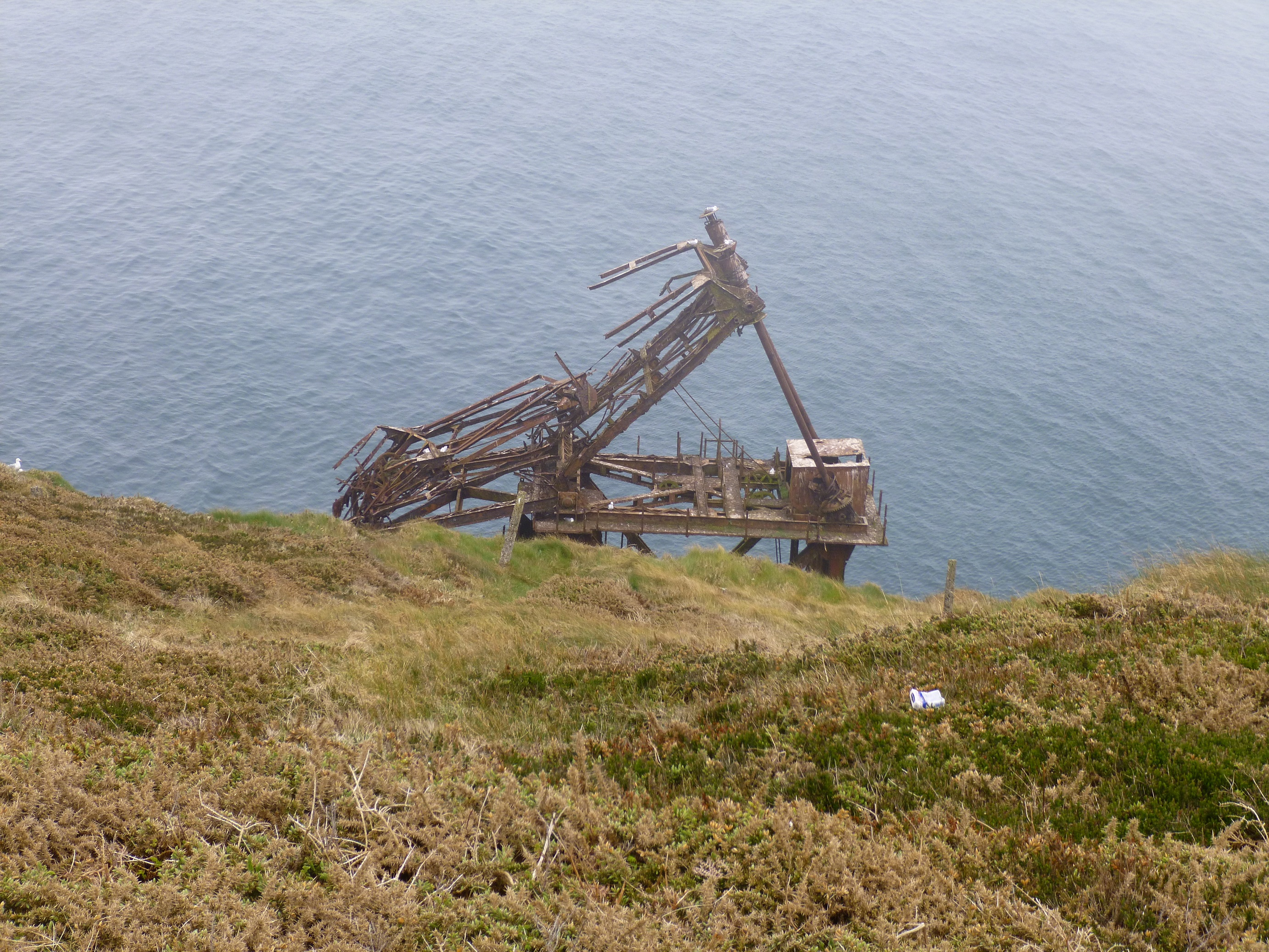
Samson, after the collapse of the jib, April 2016.

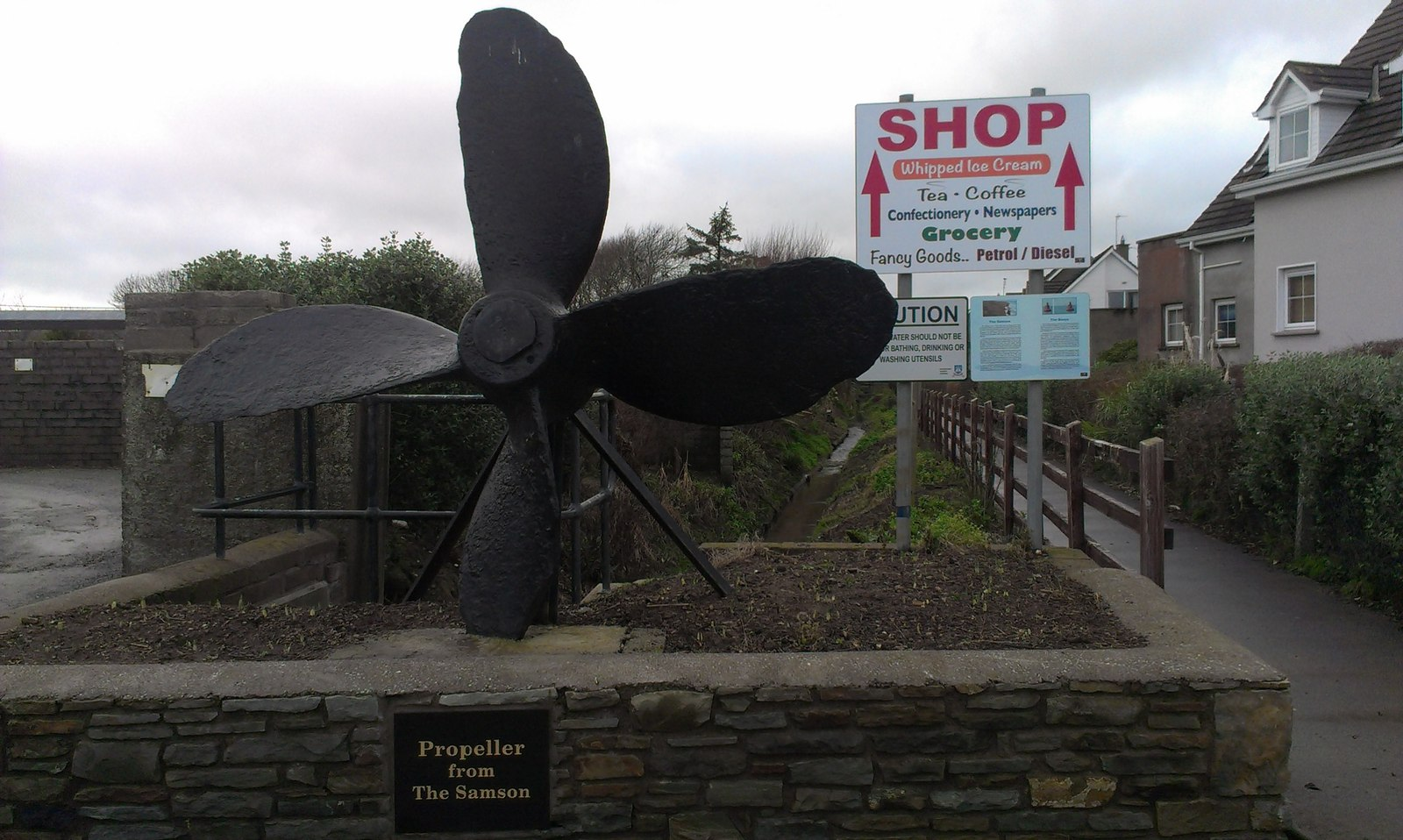
Samson's propeller, which was removed and put on display in the town of Ardmore.
