= St. Declan's Monastery =

5th-century monastery in Waterford, Ireland

- Mainistir Naomh Deaglán
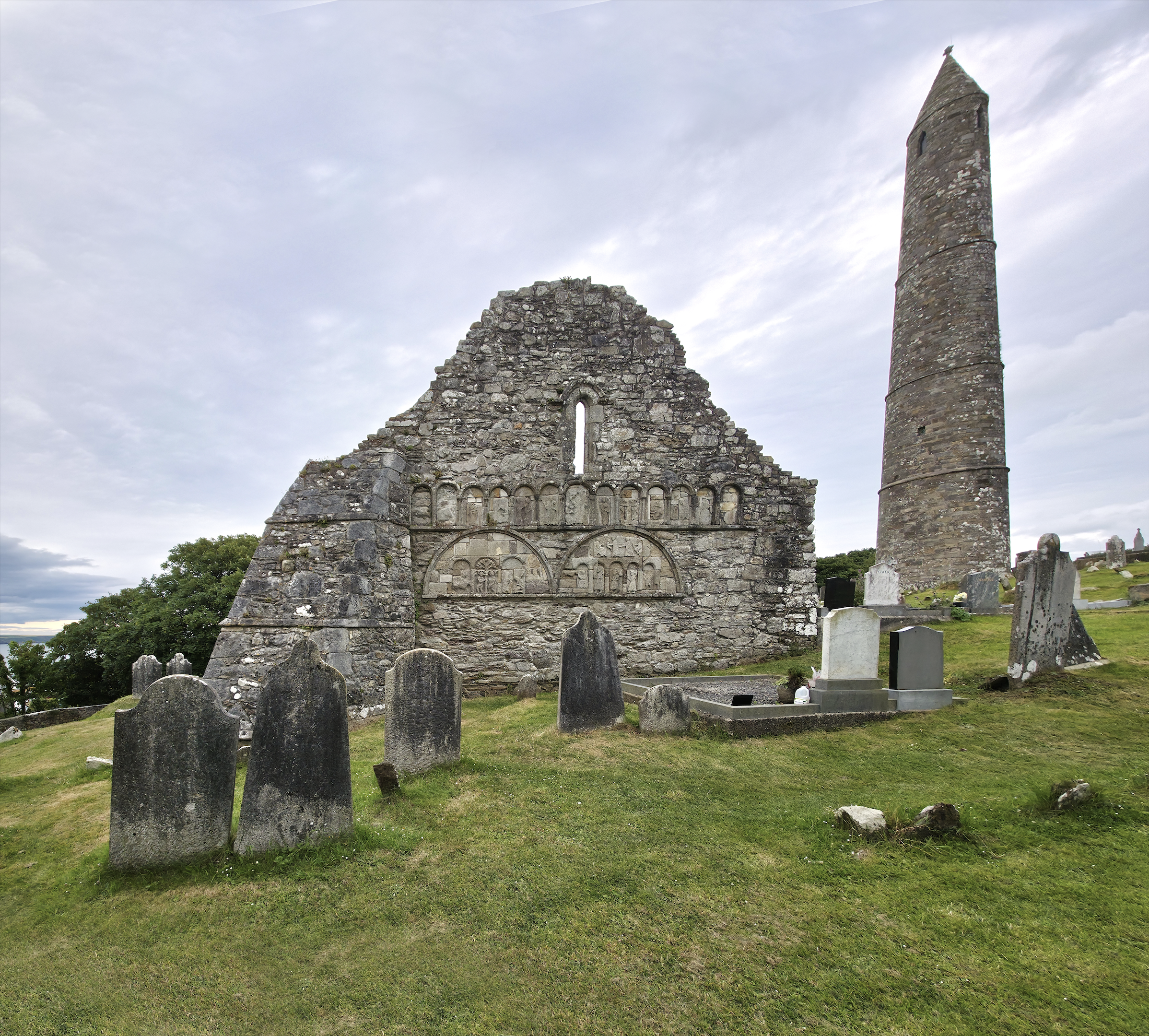

- Location within Ireland

Monastery information
- Other name: Ardmore Cathedral
- Order: Insular monasticism
- Established: c. AD 430
- Diocese: Waterford and Lismore

People
- Founder: Declán of Ardmore

Architecture
- Status: ruined
- Style: Norman, Romanesque, Gothic

Site
- Location: Ardocheasty, Ardmore, County Waterford
- Coordinates: 51°56′55″N 7°43′34″W
- Visible remains: Church, round tower, oratory
- Public access: Yes

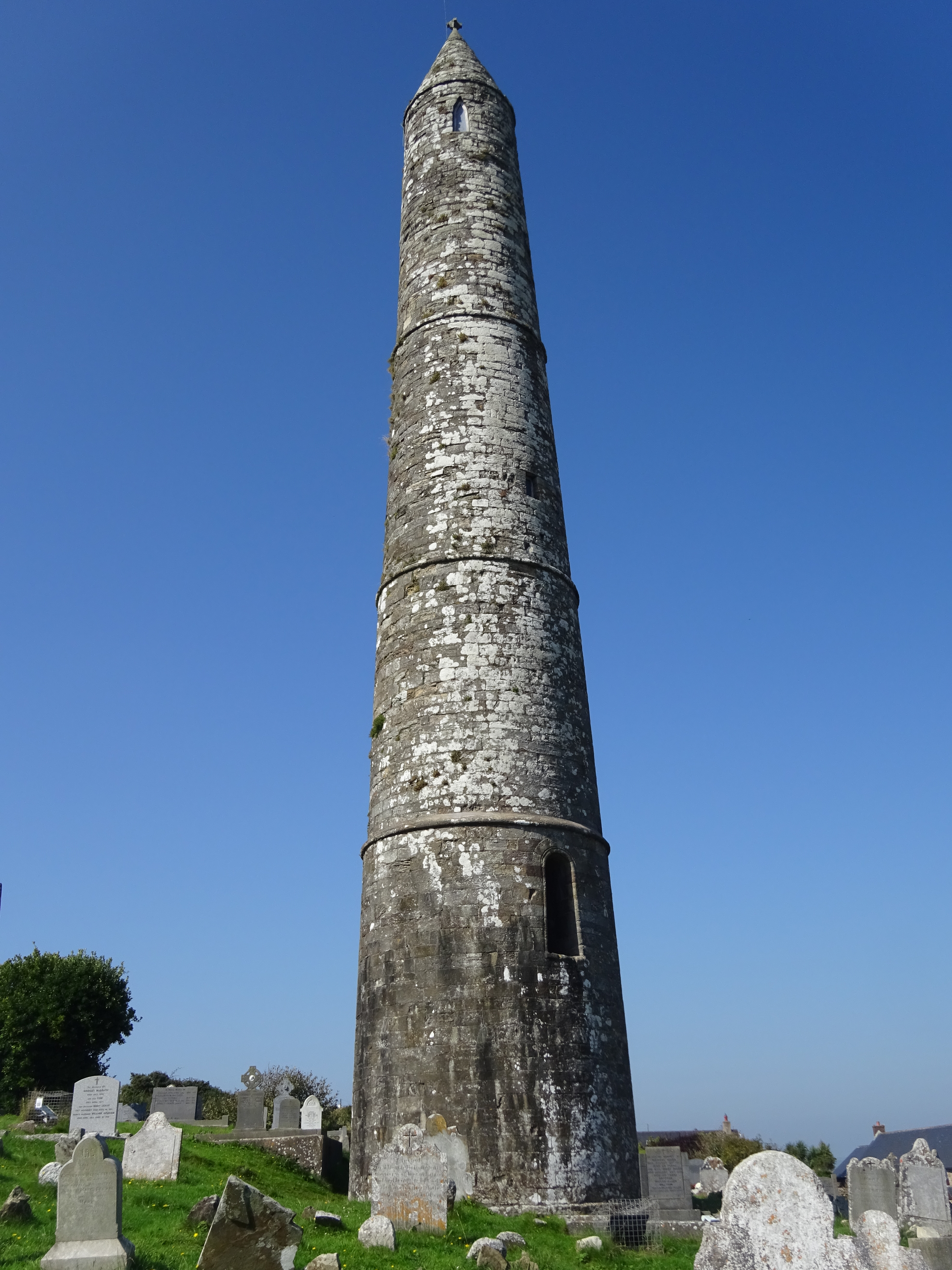
The round tower

St. Declan's Monastery, containing the remains of Ardmore Cathedral, is a former monastery and National Monument located in County Waterford, Ireland.

== Location ==
St. Declan's Monastery is located about 400 m (1/4 mile) southwest of Ardmore, County Waterford. Ardmore is built on a headland 7.5 km (4.7 mi) east of Youghal and the mouth of the Munster Blackwater.

== History ==
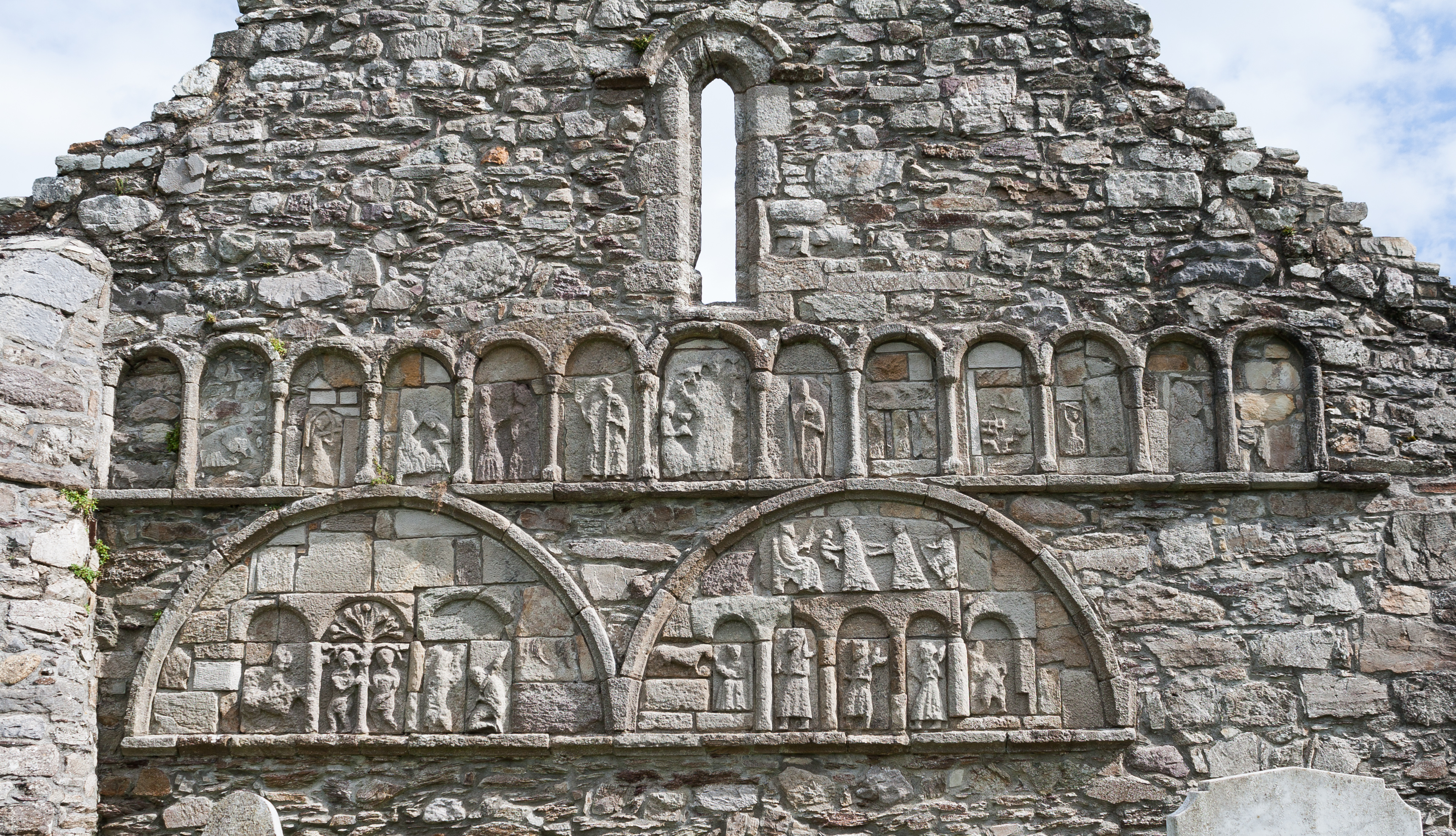
Reliefs on the west gable

Tradition states that the monastery was founded by Declán of Ardmore in the 5th century. Ultan was the abbot in AD 550.

The ogham stones are of the 5th or 6th century, while the stone chancel dates to the 9th century. St. Declan's Oratory was built in the 9th or 10th century to hold the founder's relics, while the round tower was built in the 12th century, and is considered one of the last such towers to be built. In 1174 the abbot's name was Eugene.

The nave was added in the 12th century; it shows distinctive Romanesque arcading, with several Christian themes carved in stone, within two lunettes and a blind arcade. Originally they would have been painted in bright colours but are now bare stone and badly eroded by 800 years of wind and rain; some are still recognisable as Adam and Eve, the Adoration of the Magi, Judgment of Solomon and Archangel Michael weighing souls. A bishop blessing a warrior – possibly a Crusader image or the conversion of the Déisi Muman to Christianity – is also visible. These may have been inspired by similar carvings at pilgrimage sites such as Rome or Santiago de Compostela.

Ardmore became a cathedral in 1152, the seat of the Bishop of Ardmore, Máel Étaín Ua Duib Ratha (Moelettrim O Duibh Rathra, Meolettrim O Duibh-rathra), who was suffragan to the Archbishop of Cashel; by the 13th century the title was abolished and the diocese merged into Lismore, but the church still claims the name "Ardmore Cathedral". The arch was added in the late 12th or early 13th century; it lies on a high base, 142 cm (4.66 ft) high. The moulding of the archivolt is elaborate, and the capitals are sculptured with lotus buds. The church is recorded as being finished in 1203 when Máel Étaín Ua Duib Ratha died.

Further work on the south wall and east gable was completed in the 14th century. Under the Irish Church Act 1869, money was allocated for the cathedral's preservation.

== Buildings ==
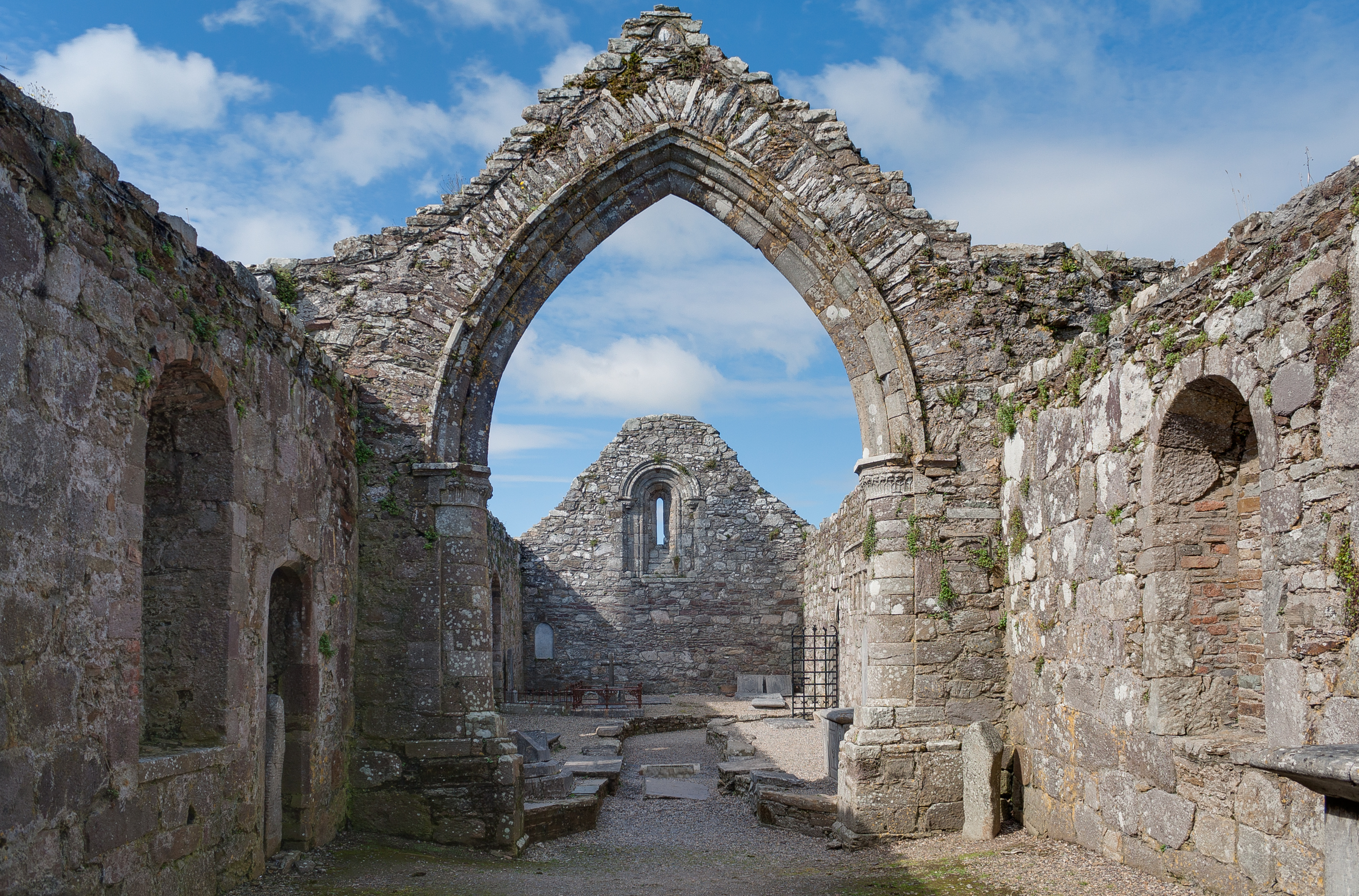
View from the choir of the church facing west into the nave; the great arch is at the centre.

The cathedral is of stone and is unroofed, divided into nave, chancel and choir. Eight medieval graveslabs are present, some decorated with fleur-de-lys, evidence of the site's Norman history.

St Declan's stone oratory is floored in large flagstones and contains an empty grave recess; pilgrims used to remove earth from the hole. It measures 13 ft (4.0 m) by 8 ft (2.4 m) and its lintel is formed of a single long stone.

The round tower is about 30 m (98 ft) high, with four storeys (each separated by string-courses) and three small windows along its body and four windows at the top, one at each of the cardinal directions. This 12th century round tower is constructed of blocks that are cut to the curve of the tower and gradually taper to the top. The Ardmore round tower is perhaps one of the finest in Ireland.

The ogham stones read:

- CIIC 263: LUGUDECCAS MAQỊ/ ̣ ̣ ? ̣ ̣MU]/COI NETA-SEGAMONAS/ DOLATI BIGAISGOB... ("Of Lugaid the smith's son of ...? of the tribe of Nad-Segamon, Dolativix the vice-bishop") Bigaisgob is thought to be from Latin vici episcopus, "rural/assistant bishop".
- CIIC 264: ...NACI MAQI ... ("-nach son of ...")
- CIIC 265: AMADU (Latin amātus, "beloved one [masculine]")

Notable graves in the graveyard include:

- Declán of Ardmore
- Declan Hurton (Old IRA), killed at Thurles in the Irish War of Independence, December 1921
- Able Seaman Michael Moylan (Royal Navy), served aboard HMS Centurion (1911) in the First World War, died 1916
- Several drowning victims (mostly Polish) of the SS Ary disaster (February 1947)

=== Gallery ===
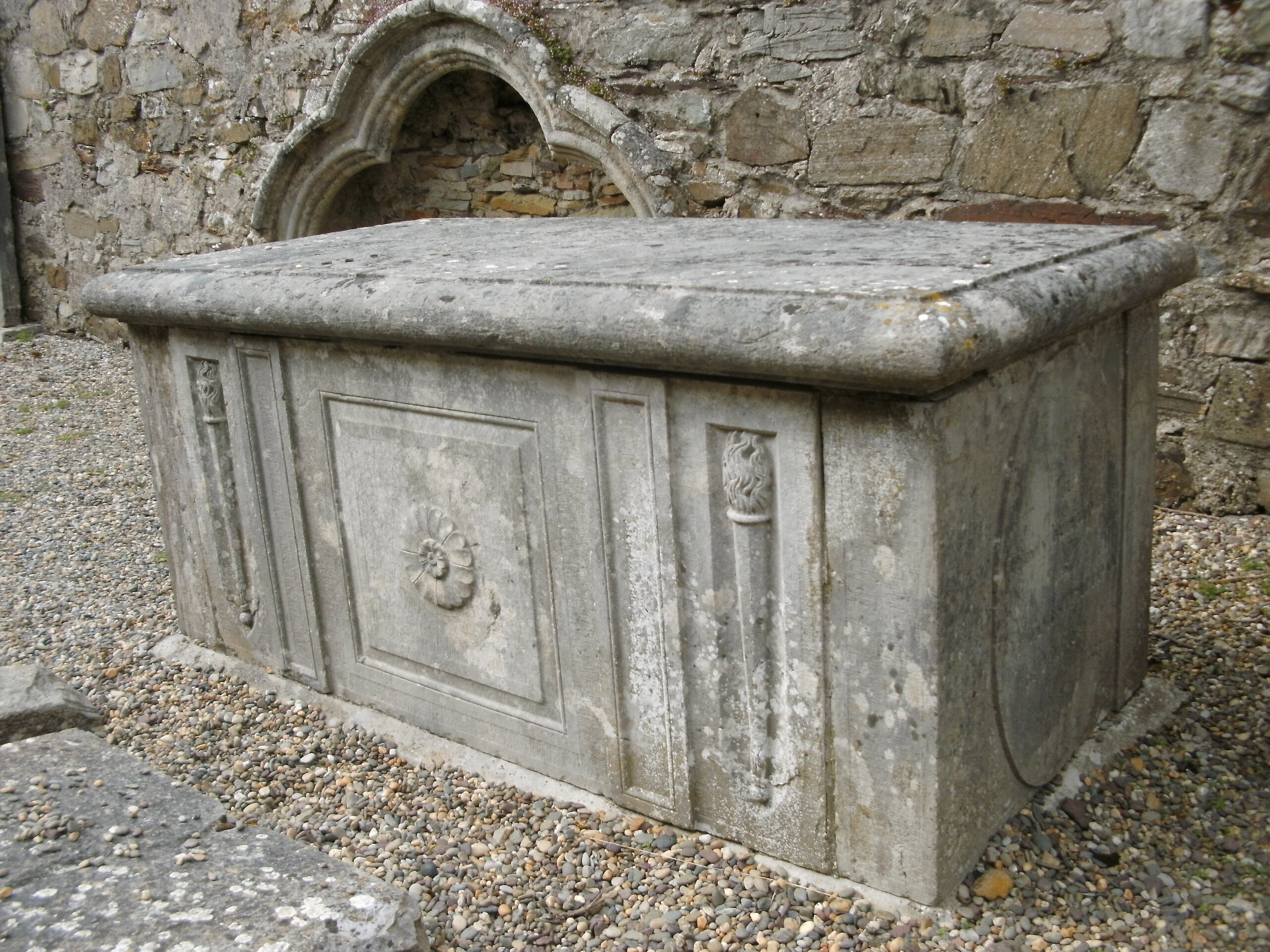
Tomb

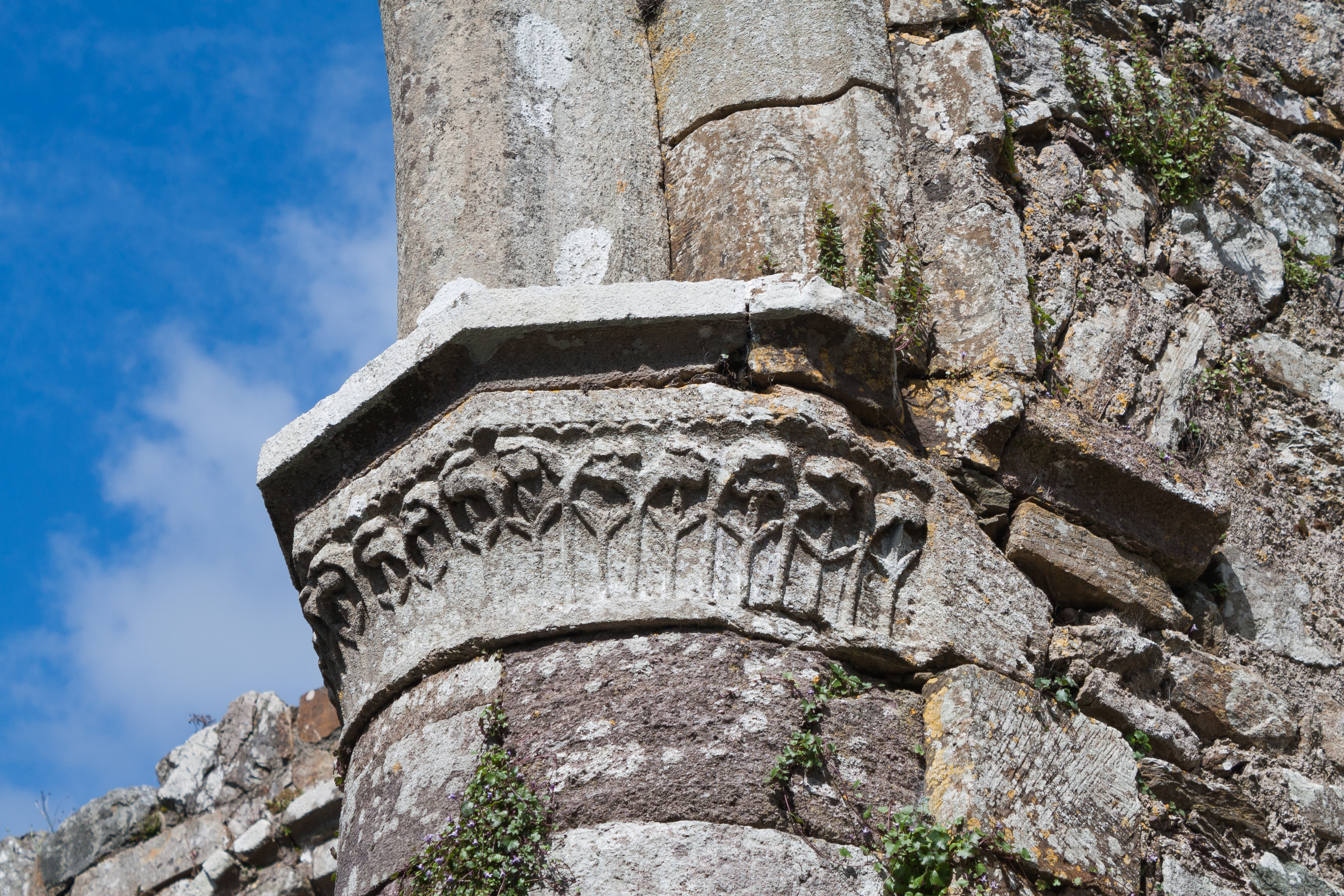
Carved capital

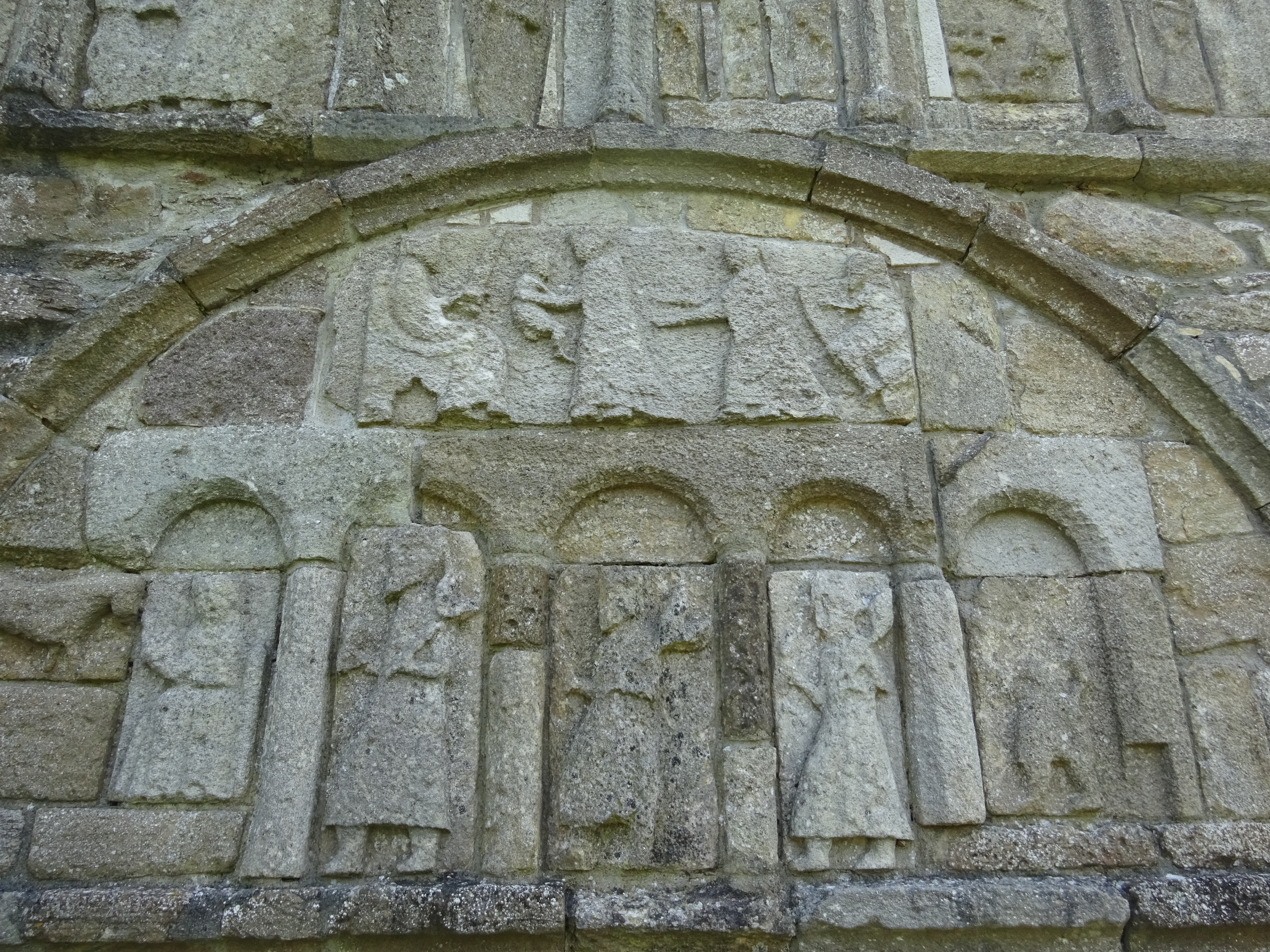
Carvings on the arcade: At top is the Judgement of Solomon, at bottom the Adoration of the Magi

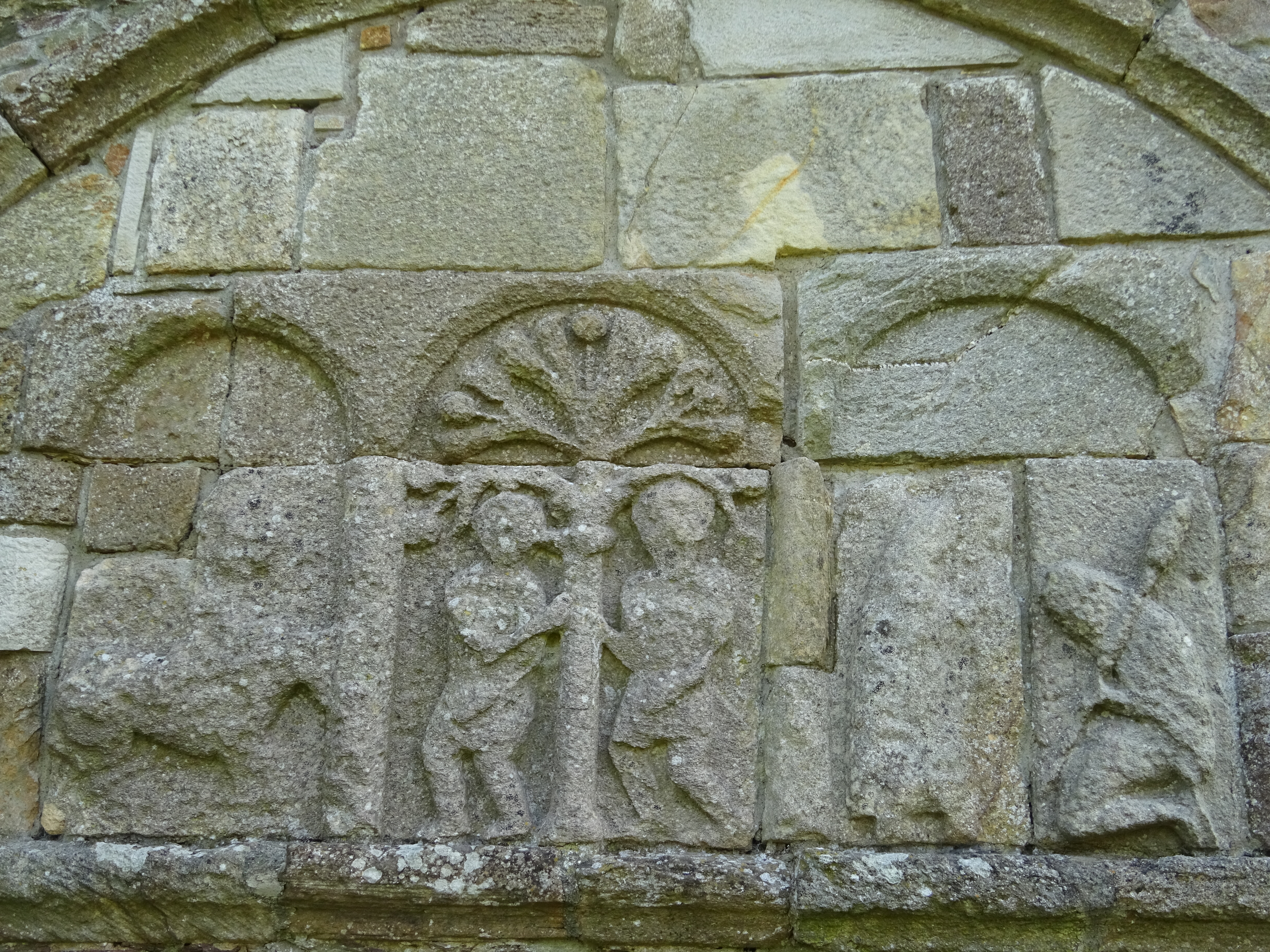
Arcade carvings: Adam and Eve and, at right, a warrior kneeling before a bishop

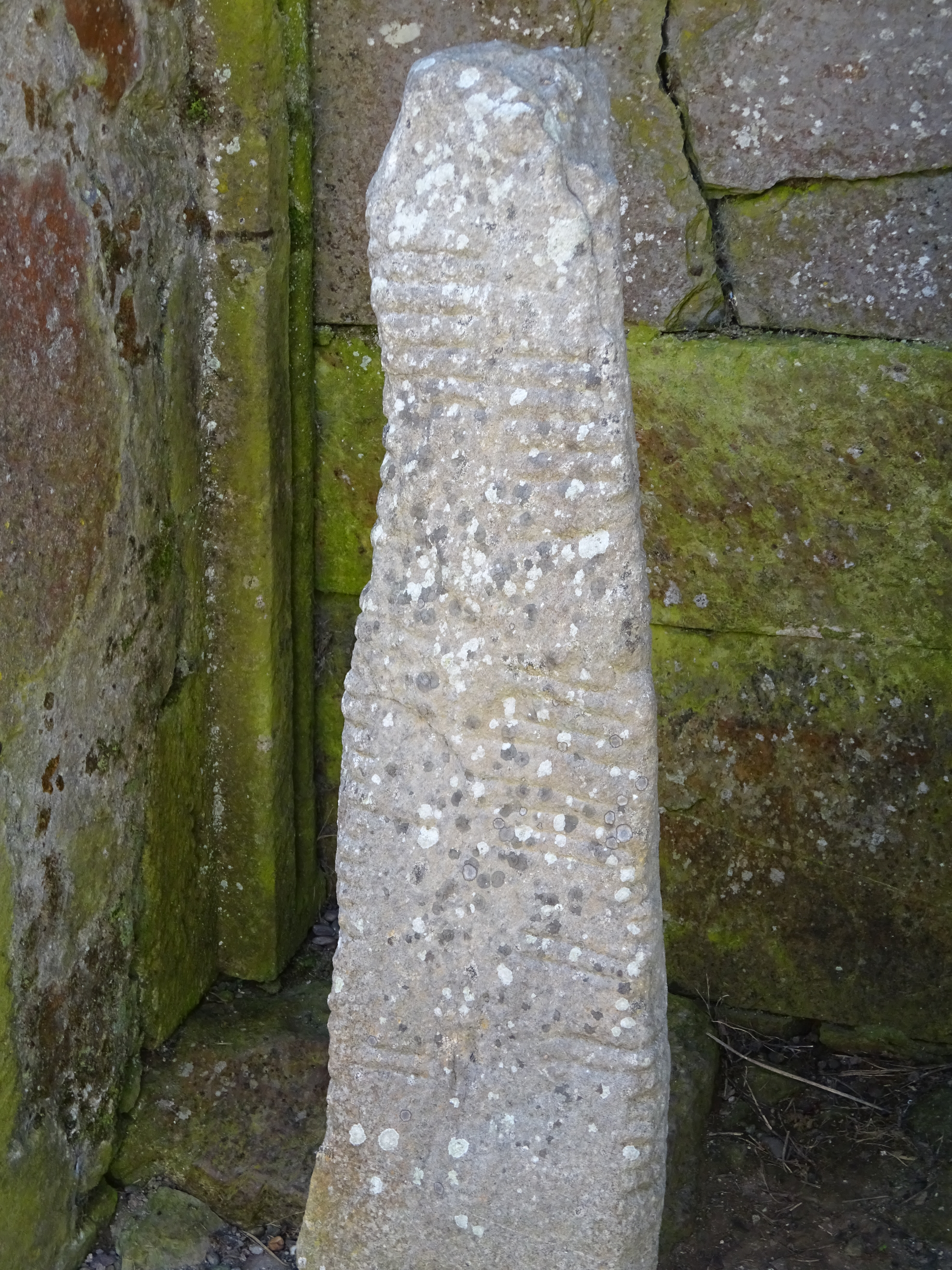
Ogham stone (CIIC 263)

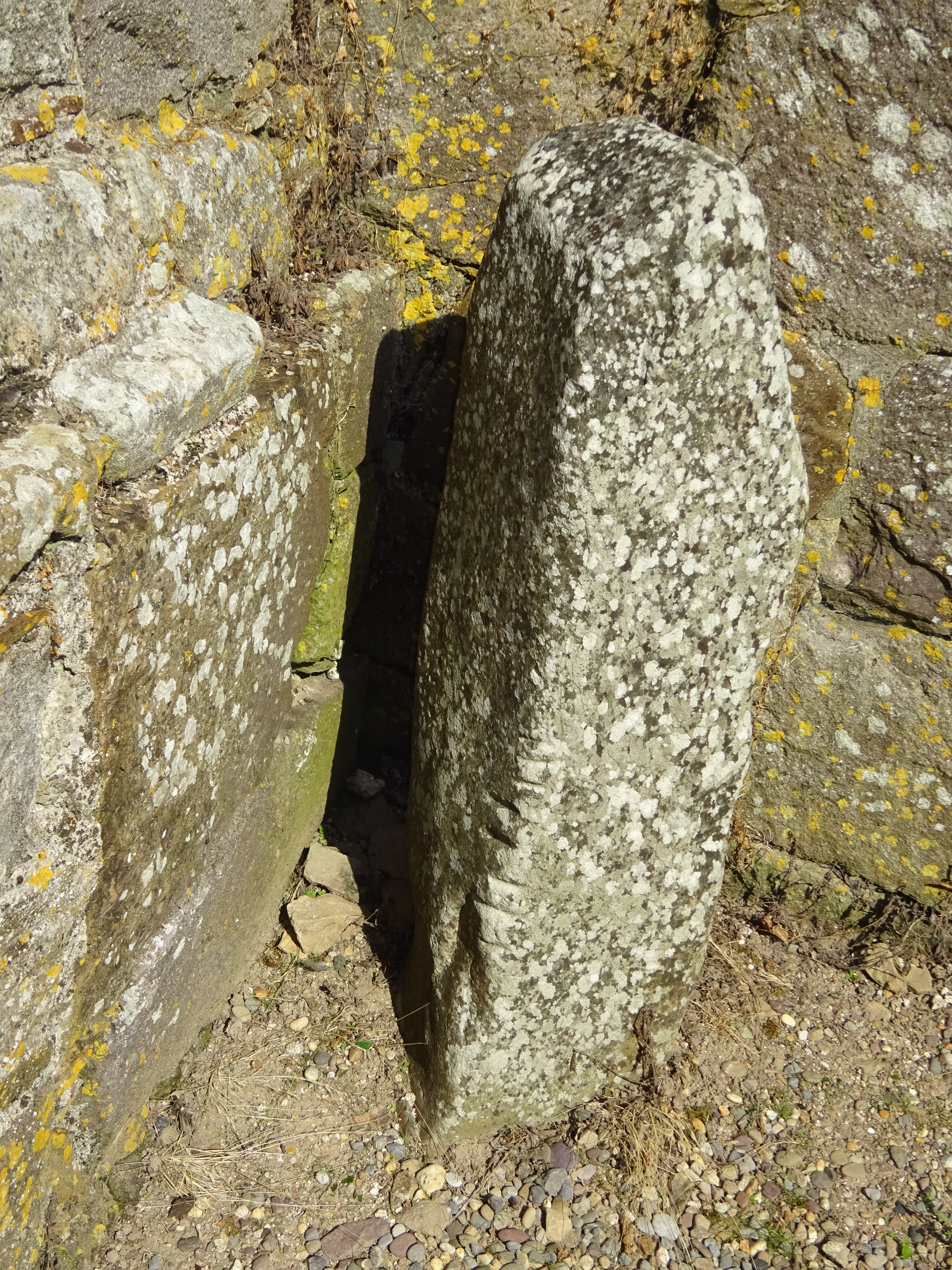
Ogham stone (CIIC 265) with Latin carving (amadu)

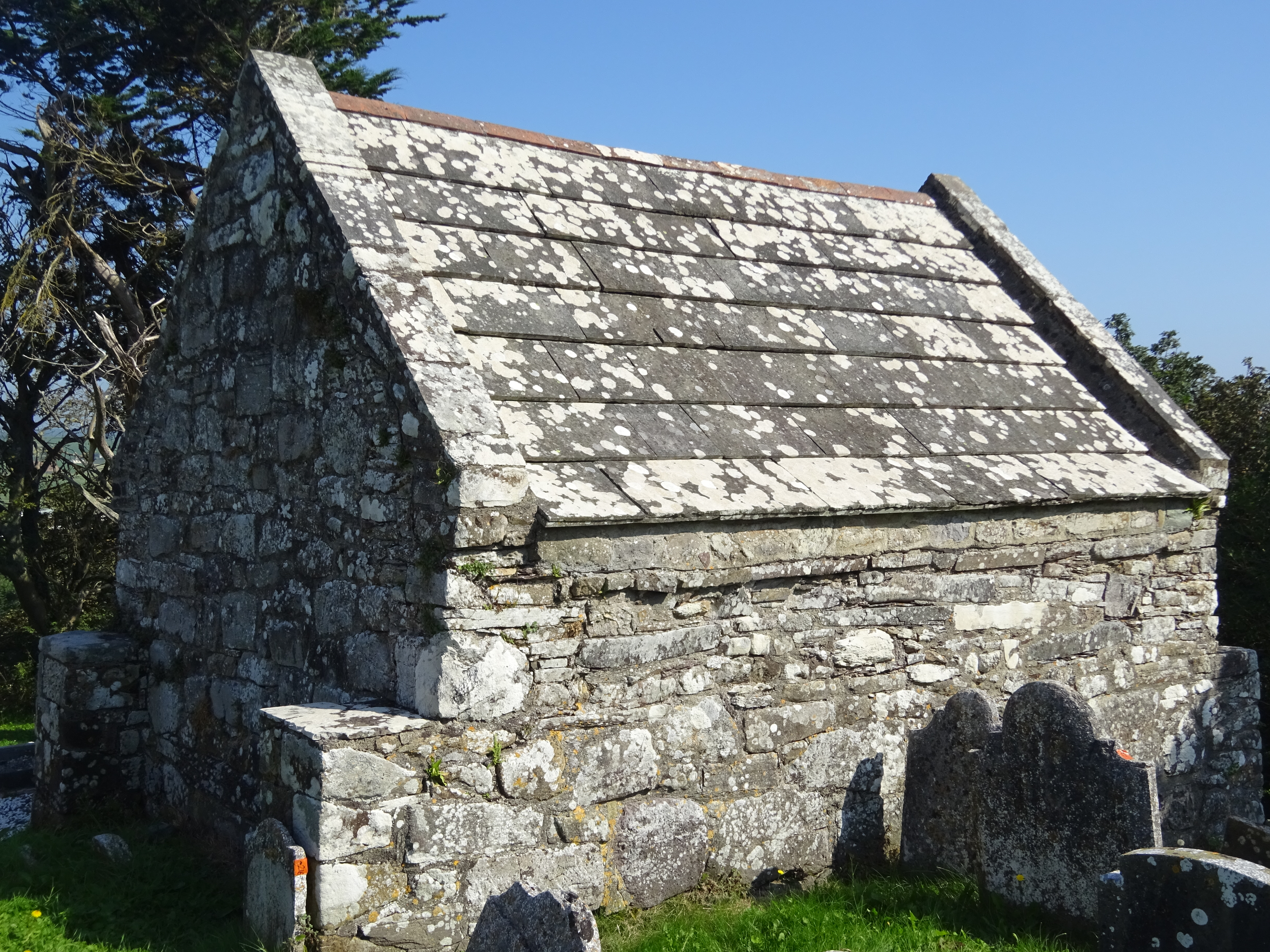
St Declan's Oratory

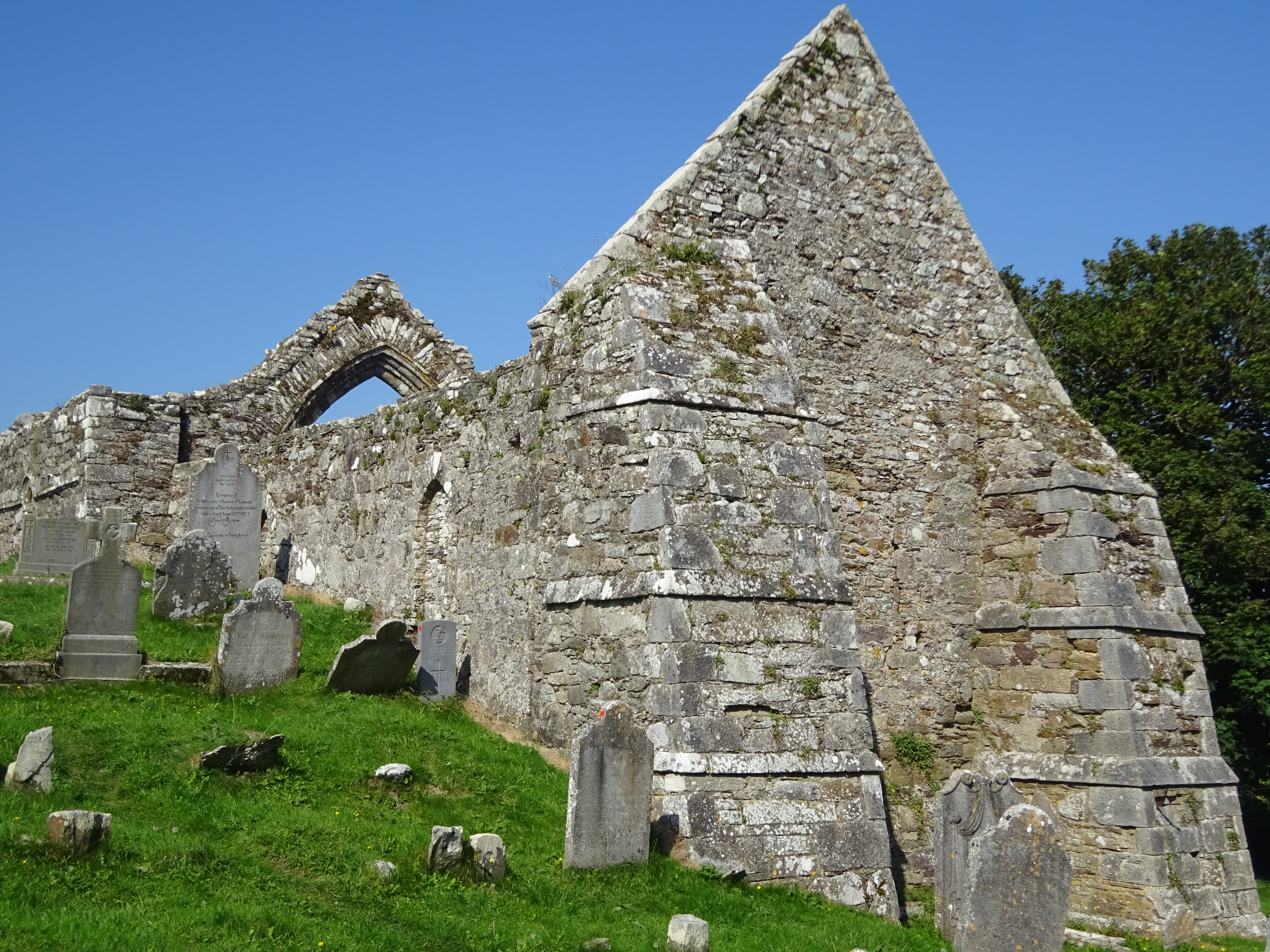
East face of the cathedral, with large buttresses

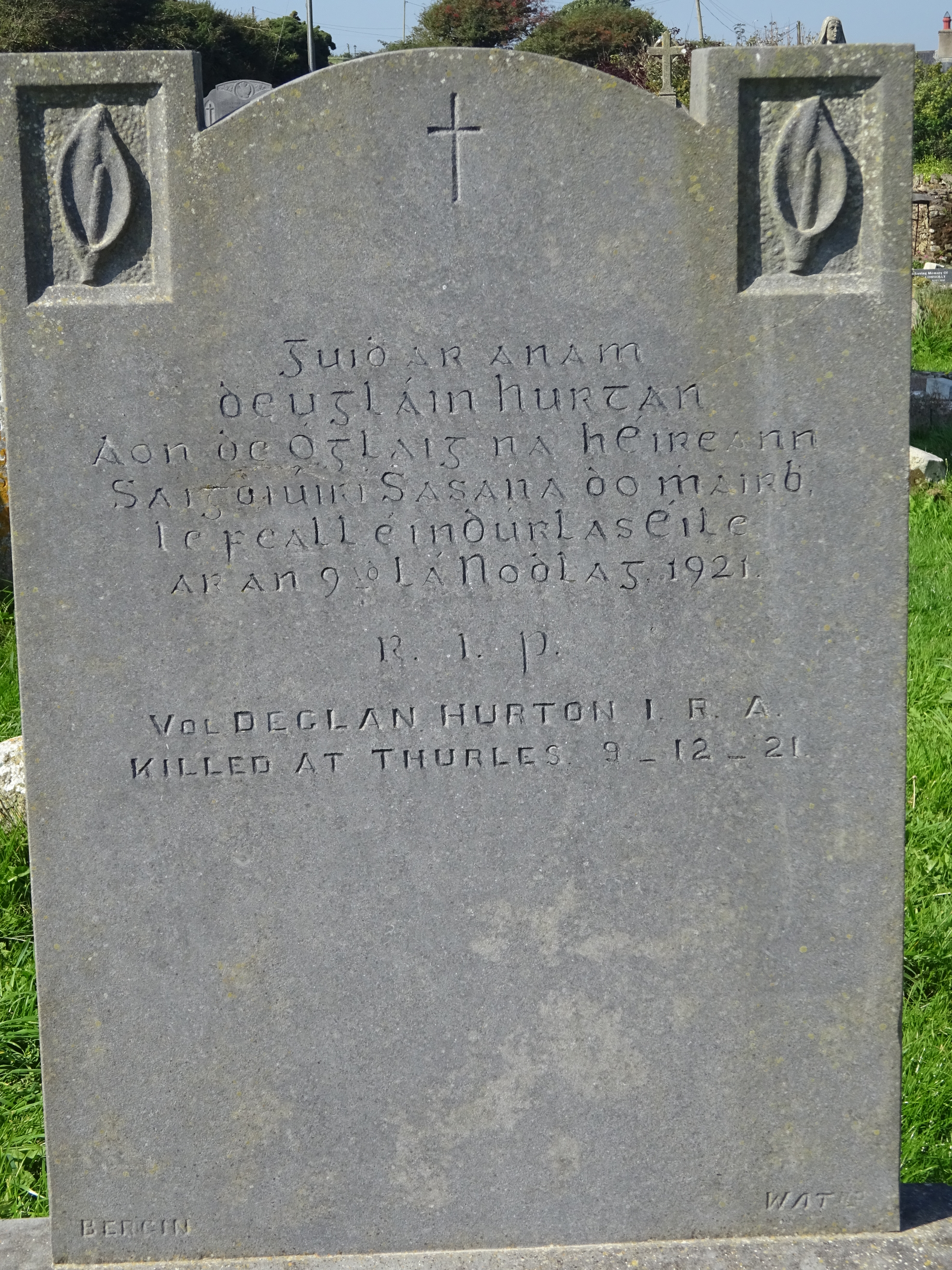
Grave of Declan Hurton (Old IRA); note the Easter lilies

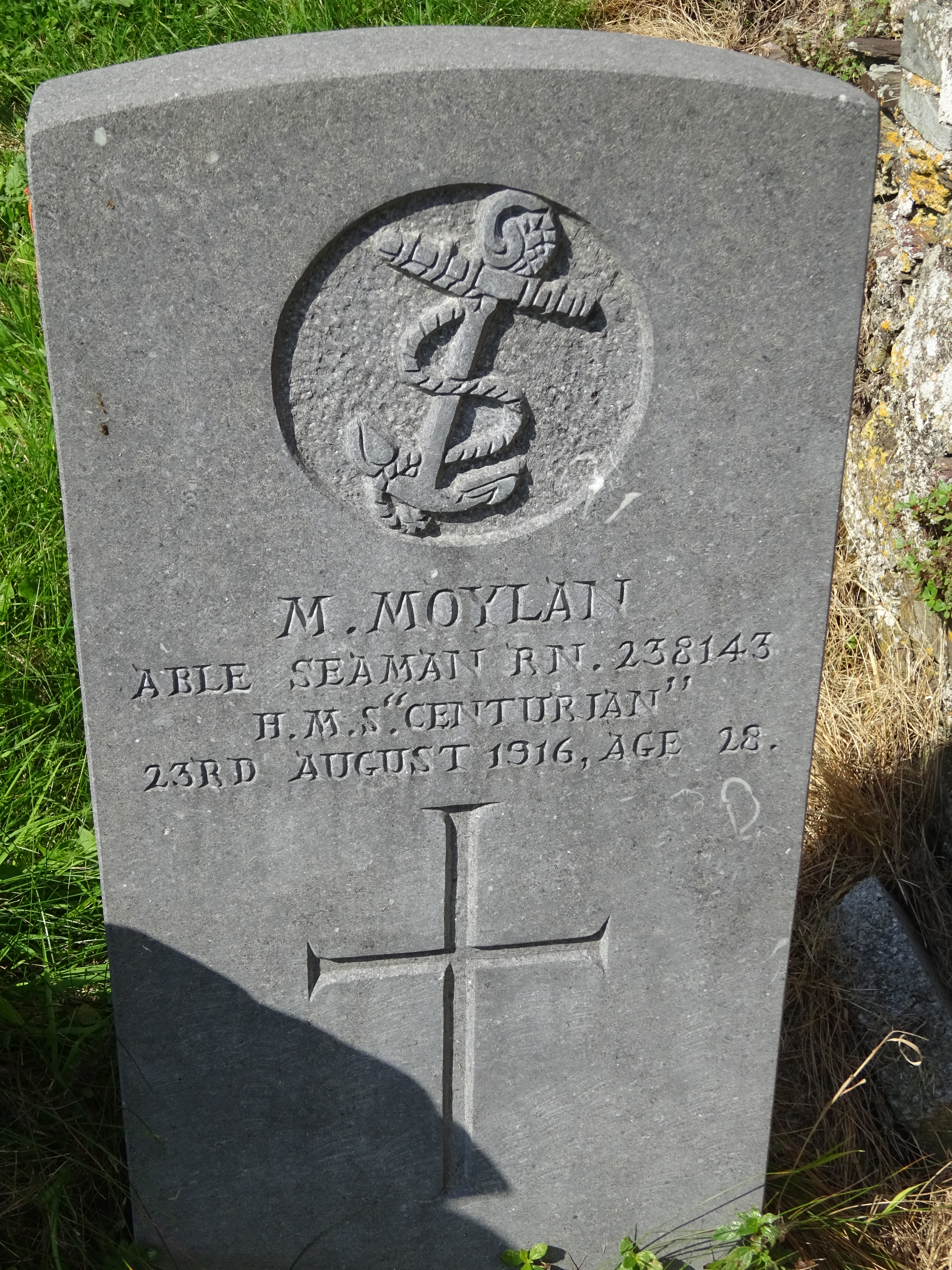
Able Seaman Moylan's grave (First World War)

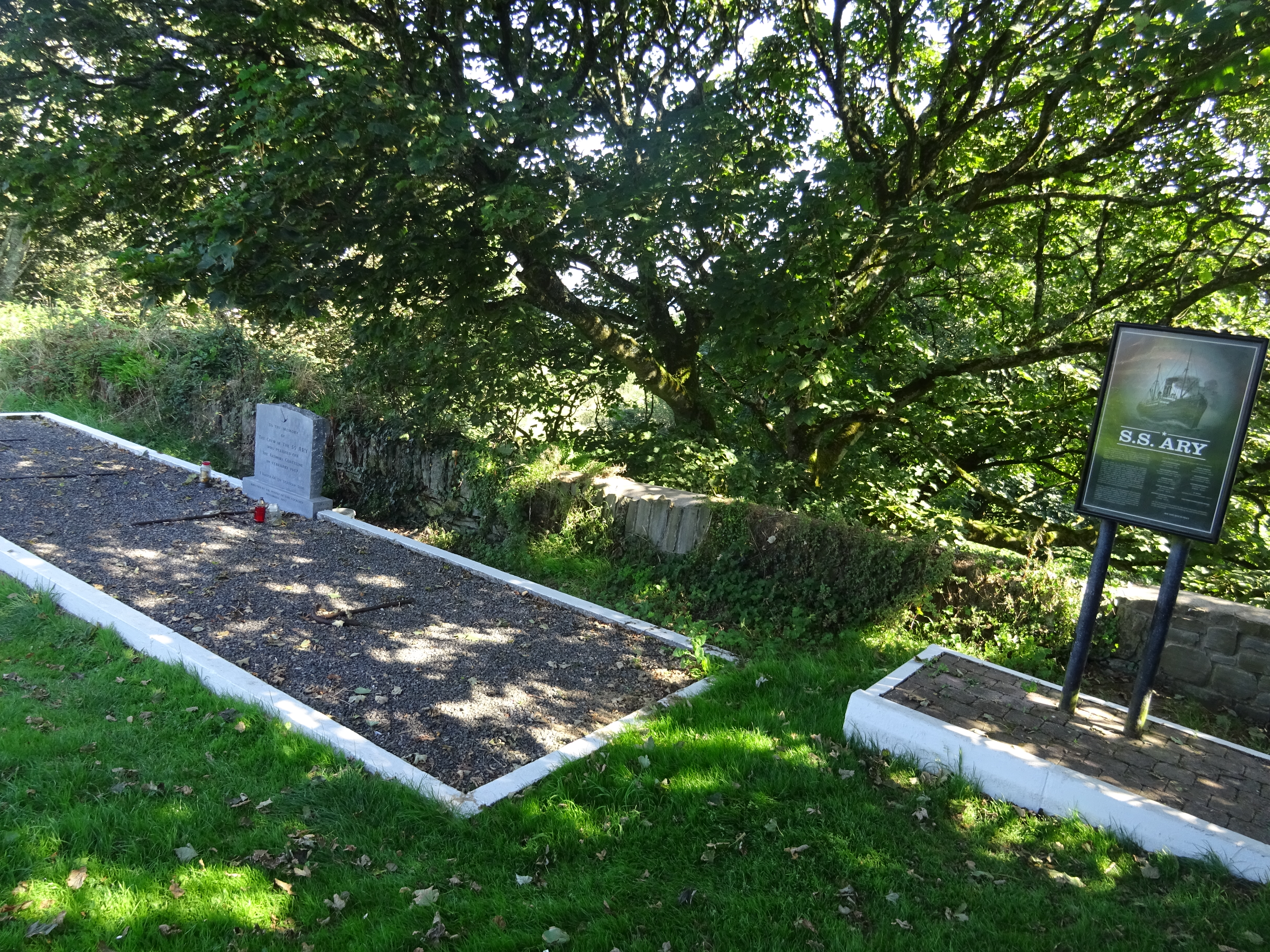
SS Ary graves
