= Declán of Ardmore =

5th-century Irish Christian missionary saint

Saint Declán of Ardmore
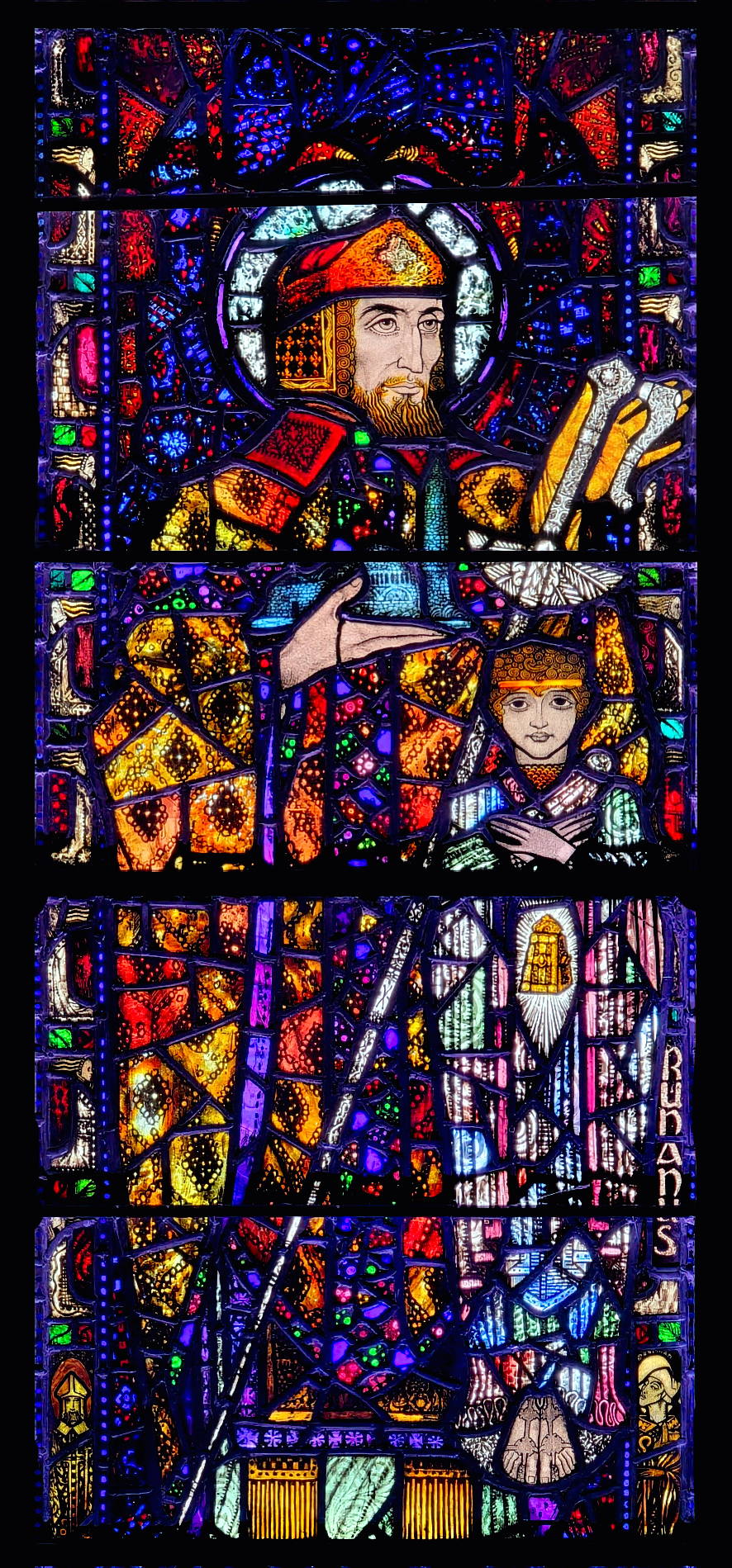
- Stained glass window of St. Declán in Honan Chapel in Cork, Ireland.

Pádraig na nDéise (Pádraig of the Déise)
- Born: c. 5th century Munster, Ireland
- Died: c. late 5th century Ardmore, County Waterford, Ireland
- Venerated in: Eastern Orthodox Church; Roman Catholicism; Anglican Communion
- Major shrine: Ardmore
- Feast: 24 July
- Patronage: Déisi, Ardmore (principal foundation), Cill Décláin

Declán of Ardmore (Old Irish: Declán mac Eircc; Irish: Deaglán, Deuglán; Latin: Declanus; died 5th century AD), also called Déclán, was an early Irish saint of the Déisi Muman who was remembered for having converted the Déisi to Christianity in the late 5th century and for having founded the monastery of Ardmore (Ard Mór) in what is now County Waterford. The principal source for his life and ministry is a Latin Life of the 12th century. Like Ailbe of Emly, Ciarán of Saigir and Abbán of Moyarney, Declán is presented as a Munster saint who preceded Saint Patrick in bringing Christianity to Ireland. He was regarded as a patron saint of the Déisi of East Munster.

== Sources ==
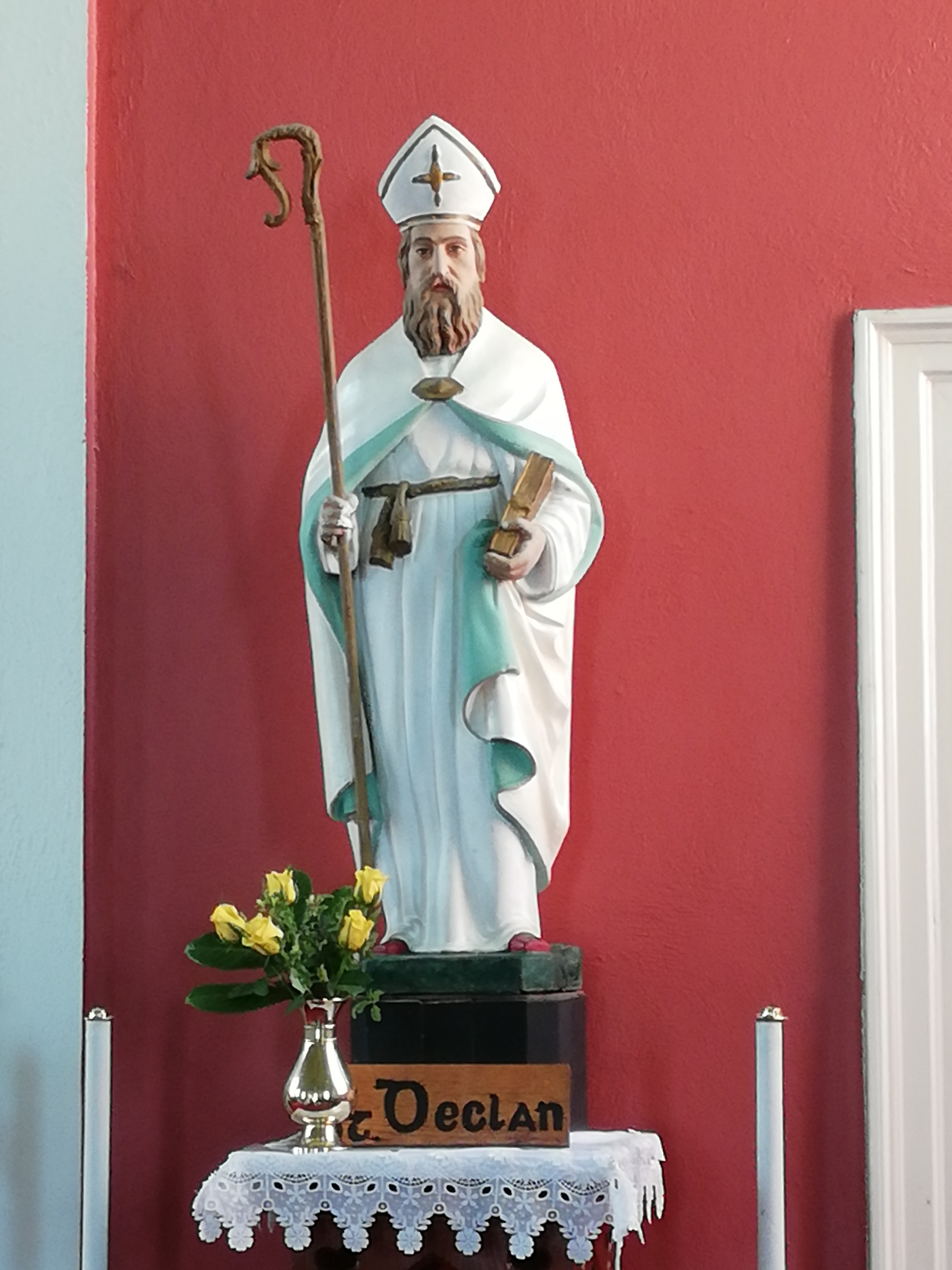
Statue in Ardmore's modern church

The main source for Declán's life and ministry is a Latin Life or vita, which, however, survives only in a redaction of the late 12th century. It is witnessed by two manuscript texts which Charles Plummer has shown to derive from the same original: (1) Dublin, TCD, MS E.3.11 (dubbed T by Plummer), f. 66b-71d; and (2) a somewhat more damaged version in Dublin, Primate Marsh's Library, MS V.3.4 (Plummer's M), f. 101 ff. Those two manuscripts are also collectively known as the Dublin Collection (or the Codex Kilkenniensis though the name is also used to refer to the Primate Marsh's Library manuscript only). In its received form, the Life leans heavily on the Life of Saint Ailbe of Emly in the Codex Salmanticensis, but earlier materials may have been incorporated. The introductory chapters draw on early Irish sagas, notably the origin legend of Déisi related in the Expulsion of the Déisi and the story of Lugaid Riab nDerg in Aided Meidbe and Medb's Three Husbands. Declán is emphatically designated as a bishop of the Déisi, which appears to echo the monastery's political ambitions in the 12th century when the Irish Church was reformed into a diocesan system following the Synod of Rathbreasail and Synod of Kells. Ardmore aspired to the status of episcopal see in the new diocese, but the privilege went instead to Lismore, founded by St Mochuda.

Declán's Latin Life was later translated into Irish. This vernacular version, sometimes referred to as Betha Decclain, is preserved in two classes of copies. The earliest of these is a copy made, with some revision, by Mícheál Ó Cléirigh in 1629 and catalogued as Brussels, Royal Library, MS 4190–4200. Ó Cléirigh reports that his ultimate source was an "old book" (seinleabhar), but his direct exemplar was a manuscript dated 1582, in the possession of Eochaidh Ui Ifernain (Eochy O'Heffernan). The two remaining copies are Dublin, Royal Irish Academy MS 23 M 50, pp. 109–120, in the hand of one John Murphy "na Raheenach" and dated 1740, and a further manuscript once in private possession. The exemplar that underlies either of them is itself an imperfectly transmitted text.

Genealogies relevant to the saint are included in the Book of Leinster, An Leabhar Breac, Book of Ballymote, and a gloss to Félire Óengusso. and Rawlinson B 502.

== Family background and career ==
Mad toich duit, a Hére,	"If thou hast a right, O Erin,
dot chobair cing báge,	to a champion of battle to aid thee,
thahut cenn céit míle,	thou hast the head of a hundred thousands,
Declan Arde máre	Declan of Ardmore."
(Félire Óengusso, 24 July)

It was through his father that Declán belonged to the royal dynasty of the Déisi Muman. The Latin Life names his father Erc(c), as do the Félire Óengusso and the genealogy in the Book of Ballymote, f. 231b. Variant traditions are recorded in the Book of Leinster (f. 348c) and the Book of Ballymote, f. 218b, which call his father Ernbrand, and in the Leabhar Breac (f. 15d), which calls him Ross (or Russ). The conflated version Ercbrand is found in Rawlinson B 502. Declán's mother Dethiden or Dethidin, as she is called in the Latin Life (§ 3), is not given any pedigree in the sources. Declán's birthplace is said to be Drumroe, near Cappoquin (western County Waterford).

In the Latin Life, Declán first embarks on a journey to Rome, where he studied and was ordained bishop by the Pope. At Rome, he meets his fellow countryman St Ailbe of Emly, and on returning to Ireland, he meets Saint Patrick. Throughout the text, Declán recognises the supreme authority of both saints and with Patrick, he comes to an arrangement about the sphere of their mission in Ireland. On St Patrick's instructions, Declán founds the monastery of Ardmore (Irish Ard Mór), which lies near the Irish coast, in the southeast of the kingdom of the Déisi Muman, and having obtained Patrick's blessing, goes on to convert the Déisi to Christianity.

The span of Declán's lifetime and career is extended in another chapter (§ 15), which makes him a contemporary of Saint David of Wales in the 6th century. Likewise, the even later saint Ultan of Ardbraccan (d. 655 x 657) is presented as Declán's pupil.

The Lives also relates that the saint later paid a visit to the Déisi of Mide/Meath, where the King of Tara welcomed him and granted him land for the purpose of founding a "monastery of canons". The monastery founded there became known as Cill Décláin (Killegland, Ashbourne, County Meath).

== The pre-Patrician saints of Munster ==
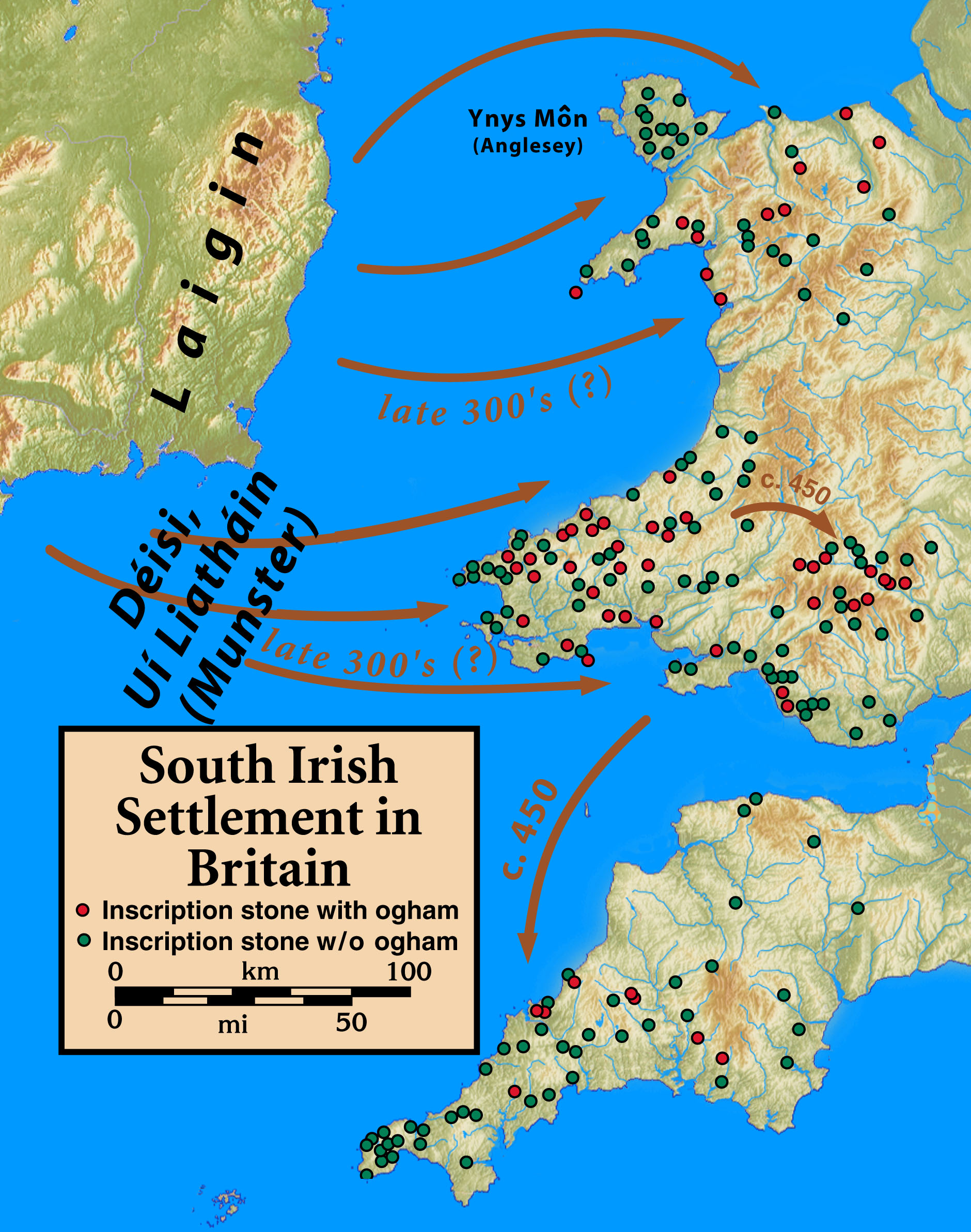

Declan is one of four Munster saints who had Lives written for them claiming that they founded monasteries and preached the Gospel in Munster before their younger contemporary Saint Patrick ever set foot in Ireland. The bishop saints, known since the 17th century as quattuor sanctissimi episcopi, also included Ailbe of Emly, Ciarán of Saigir and Abbán of Moyarney. The same claim was apparently made for Íbar of Beggery Island, according to the Life of St Abbán, which identifies him as Abbán's uncle and teacher, but no separate Life survives which offers any information to this effect. The relevant Lives are all found in the so-called Dublin Collection (see above), which bears a stamp of editorial intervention.

Their testimony, late though it seems, has often been treated in relation to the historical question of pre-Patrician Christianity in the south of Ireland. It has been argued that before the coming of Patrick, the south coast of Munster would have provided the most likely point of entry for the introduction of Christianity via Britain or via Gaul. The settlements of the Déisi and the Uí Liatháin in southwest Wales, as evidenced by the distribution of ogam stones, provided an important connection between Britain and Ireland. A key aspect of this overseas link, the import of slaves, usually British Christians, by Irish raiders would have directly exposed Munster to the influence of Christianity. Further, Munster, lying opposite to Gaul, would have represented a first destination for Irish trading connections with the Continent. In the context of the wine trade, this is in some way corroborated by the archaeological record for pottery in Munster settlements.

The credit traditionally given to Saint Patrick for bringing Christianity to the island appears to owe much to the propaganda of one particular foundation. As early as the 7th century, Armagh was busy bolstering its claim to the status of the principal house founded by St Patrick. By promoting the life and ministry of the saint, which entailed that Patrick was propagated as the apostle and first bishop of the Irish, it sought to establish and control a network of religious houses throughout the country. The fact that a missionary sent by Rome, Palladius, had been active before St Patrick, in 431, possibly in Leinster, did not sit well with its agenda. In the writings of Armagh scholars, notably Tírechán and Muirchú, Palladius' activities were therefore belittled as a failure, ignored or, as T.F. O'Rahilly famously argues in his hypothesis of the 'Two Patricks', silently conflated with those of Patrick. In Armagh historiography, the conversion of Munster became embodied in the story of the conversion of Óengus mac Nad Froích by St Patrick at Cashel, first told by Tírechán and subsequently elaborated many times over.

The Lives of Ailbe, Declán, Ciarán and Abbán in the Dublin Collection appear to reflect the need of the Munster houses to offer some counterweight against the Patrician dossier promoted by Armagh, even though they do not deny the national importance of Saint Patrick. Historian Richard Sharpe proposed the earlier Life of Ailbe in the Codex Salmanticensis was originally composed in the eighth century to further the cause of the Éoganacht church of Emly. In the same century, the Law of Ailbe (784) was issued, possibly in response to the Law of Patrick.

The Dublin Collection, however, goes further when it attributes to the saints an important pre-Patrician career. Pre-eminence is given to Ailbe, whose Dublin Life asserts that Munster was entrusted to him by St Patrick, while to similar effect, Ailbe is called a "second Patrick and patron of Munster" (secundus Patricius et patronus Mumenie) in Declán's Life.

Dagmar Ó Riain-Raedel has argued that this way of promoting Munster saints was anticipated in texts emanating from the Schottenklöster or Irish Benedictine monasteries of southern Germany, whose principal house was at Regensburg. Not only was there a strong Munster presence, but many such texts were written down in recognition of the generous donations received from the kings of Desmond and Thomond.

The most substantial achievement is the hagiographic compilation known as Magnum Legendarium Austriacum (The Great Austrian Legendary), begun sometime in the 1160s or 1170s. The prologue to a recension of St Patrick's Life preserved incomplete at Göttweig (Austria) asserts that disciples of one Mansuetus, an Irish bishop of Toul, had set themselves up as bishops in Ireland to prepare the way for St Patrick. In the mid-12th century, a Life was composed at Regensburg relating the life and miracles of Ailbe under his German name, Saint Albert. Ó Riain-Raedel connects that to the establishment of Cashel as an archiepiscopal seat in 1111 because it was Ailbe, being the patron saint of the nearby foundation of Emly, who played a key role in advertising its new status.

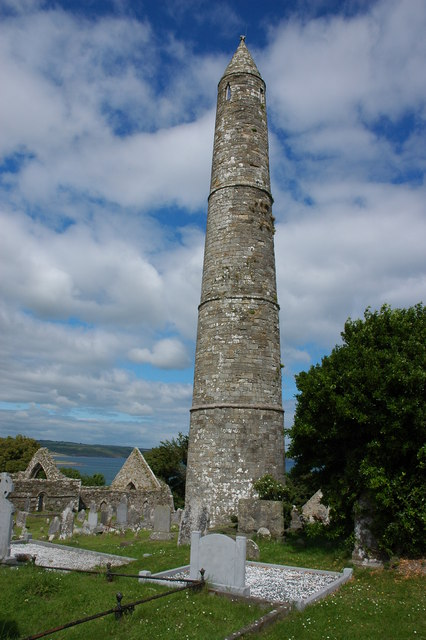
Round Tower at Ardmore

== Commemoration ==
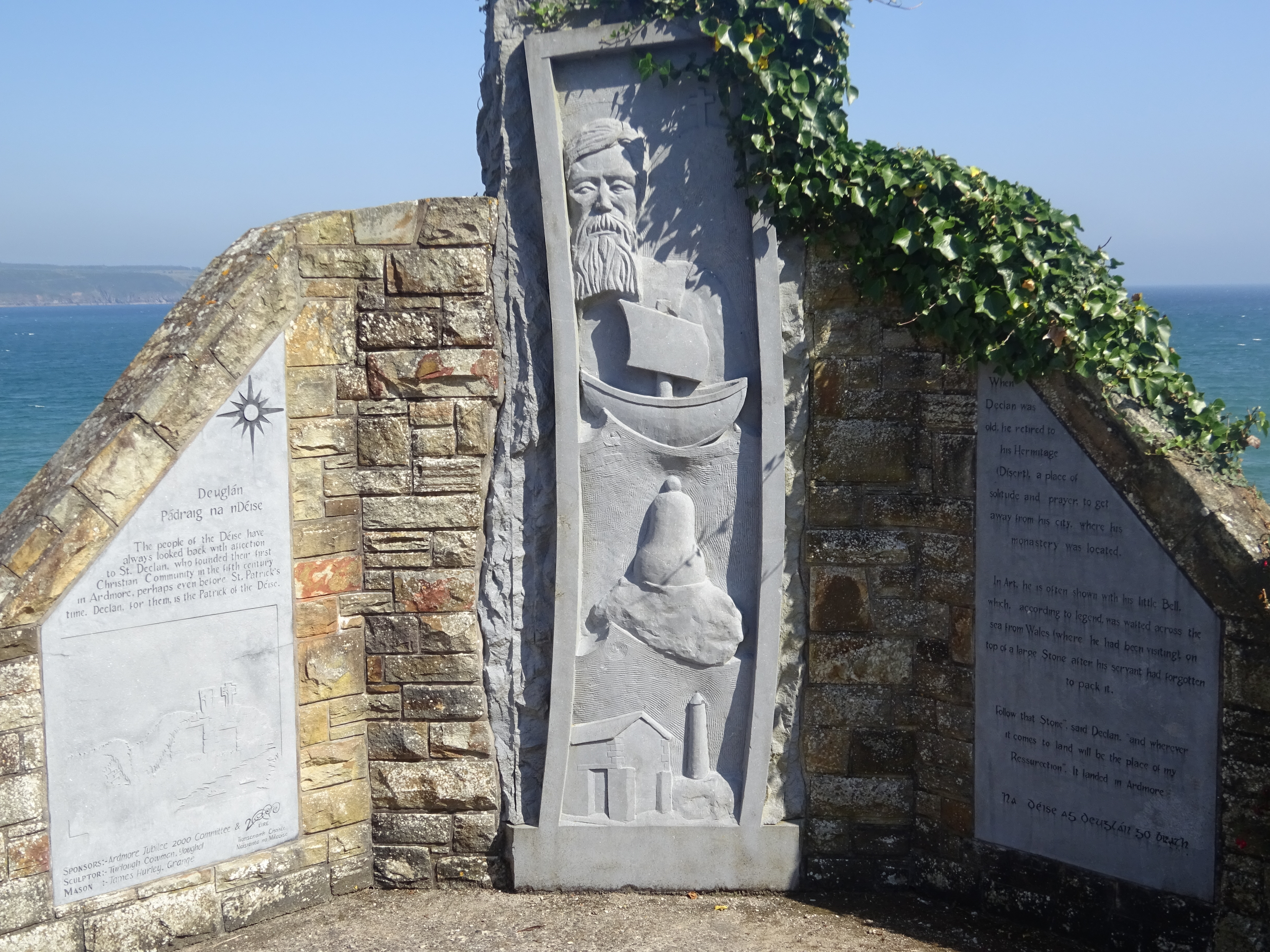
Memorial stone in Ardmore

According to his Life, Declán is reposed in the Lord at his monastery in Ardmore and was subsequently buried there. His feast day in the martyrologies is 24 July. A Middle Irish note added to the Félire Óengusso, which is of no historical value, tells that Declán was responsible for introducing rye (Irish secal, from Latin secale) into Ireland.

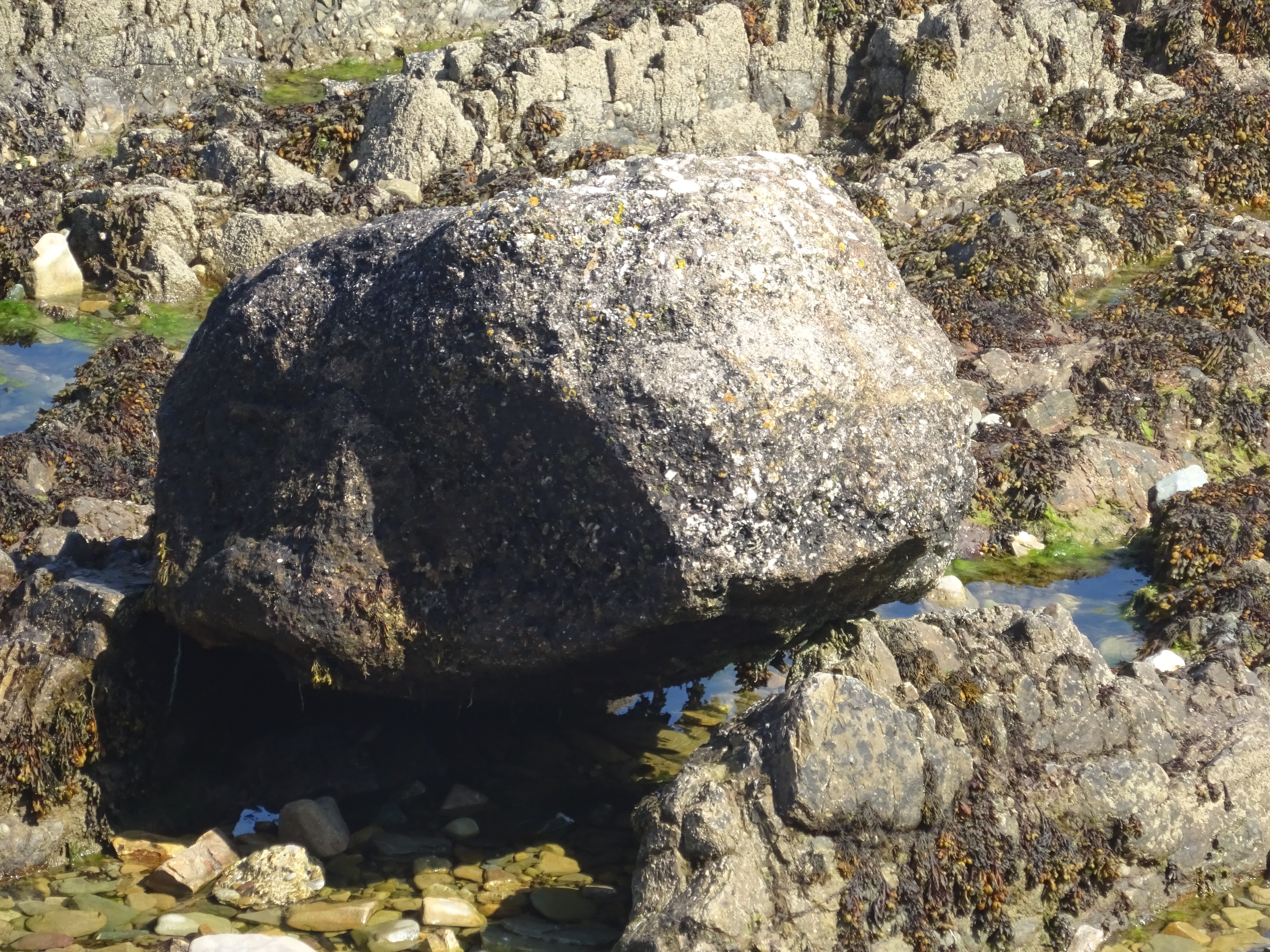
St Declan's Stone on Ardmore beach; supposedly, it carried his bell to Ireland.

Declán has enjoyed a steady reputation in Waterford, where many church dedications still name him. Every year on his feast day, locals and people from the region celebrate his pattern. The pattern includes various devotional acts at sites associated with his life. The path walked by Declan from Ardmore to Cashel, County Tipperary has been restored as St Declan's Pilgrim Path, and an annual walk of the path, nicknamed the "Irish Camino", is organised from 24 to 28 July, beginning in 2013.

A round tower still stands at the site of the saint's monastery at Ardmore as well as earlier ecclesiastical ruins, such as a stone oratory and a small stone church. The diocese of Ardmore and its episcopal church lasted until the 13th century.

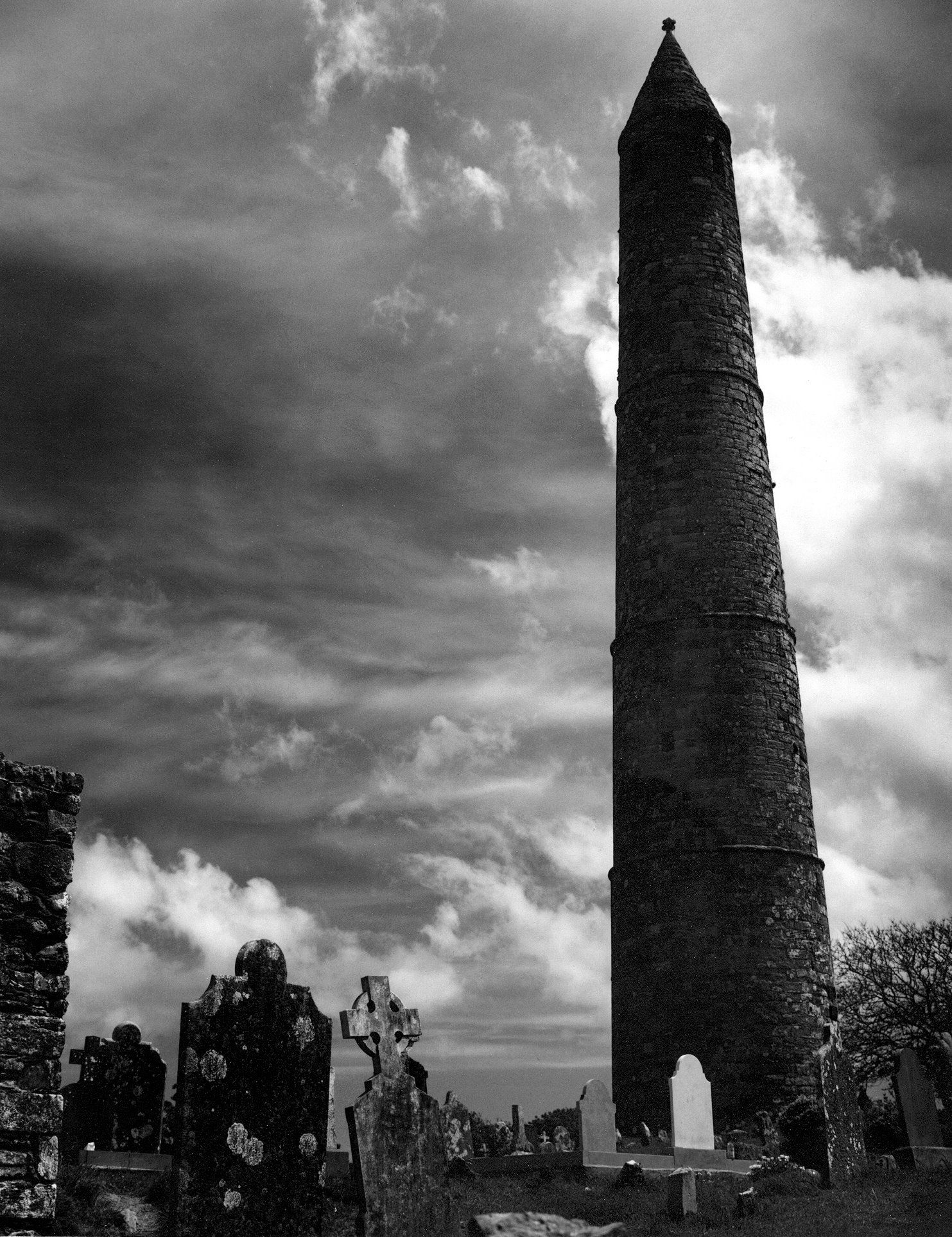
Ardmore Round Tower, 1986

== Primary sources ==
- Latin Life of St Declán, ed. Charles Plummer, Vitae sanctorum Hiberniae. Vol. 2. Oxford, 1910. pp. 32–59. Available from the Internet Archive.
- Irish Life of St Declán, ed. and tr. Rev. Patrick C. Power, Life of St. Declan of Ardmore, with an Introduction, Translation and Notes. Irish Texts Society 16. London, 1914. Based on the Brussels MS, with variants from RIA MS 23 M 50. Edition and translation transcribed at CELT. Another transcription can be found at Electronic Text Center, University of Virginia Library.
- Óengus of Tallaght (1905). Stokes, Whitley (ed.). The Martyrology of Oengus the Culdee. Henry Bradshaw Society. Vol. 29. London. p. 415. 24 July

== Secondary sources ==
- Breen, Aidan. "St Declan (Déclán)." Dictionary of Irish Biography. Accessed: 28 Jan 2010.
- Kelly, Fergus (2000). Early Irish Farming. Early Irish Law Series IV. Dublin: DIAS.
- Sharpe, Richard (1991). Medieval Irish Saints' Lives: An Introduction to 'Vitae Sanctorum Hiberniae'. Oxford.
- Johnston, Elva (2004). "Munster, saints of (act. c.450–c.700)." Oxford Dictionary of National Biography. Oxford University Press, Sept 2004. Accessed: 14 Dec 2008.
- Ó Cathasaigh, Tomás (1984). "The Déisi and Dyfed." Éigse 20. pp. 1–33.
- Ó Riain-Raedel, Dagmar (1998). "The Question of the 'Pre-Patrician' Saints of Munster." In Early Medieval Munster. Archaeology, History and Society, ed. M.A. Monk and J. Sheehan. Cork. 17–22.
