= John Morice (died 1362) =

English-born statesman

Sir John Morice, Morris or Moriz (died 1362) was an English-born statesman of the fourteenth century whose career was mainly spent in Ireland. He is remembered chiefly for his enthusiastic, if not very successful, efforts to reform the Irish administration, and for the fact that a portrait of him still exists. This is said to be the earliest portrait of an Irish judge and can be viewed by the public.

== Early career ==
He was born in Bedfordshire. His family are said to have been gentry who had a good estate but lacked influential political connections. He began his career in the service of the powerful Anglo-French nobleman Aymer de Valence, 2nd Earl of Pembroke, and served him intermittently until Pembroke's death in 1324. In 1313 he was pardoned for his adherence to the murderers of the Royal favourite Piers Gaveston. He was a knight of the shire for Bedfordshire in the Parliament of 1322. He is first heard of in Ireland in 1324 in the entourage of the Justiciar of Ireland, John Darcy, 1st Baron Darcy de Knayth. Morice himself held the offices of Justiciar and Deputy Justiciar on several occasions and was briefly Lord Chancellor of Ireland in 1345-6. Smyth records that he had to travel to Kilmallock to present his warrant as Chancellor to the Council. He was also Escheator of Ireland from 1329 to 1336, and sat on a number of special commissions in England, mostly in his native Bedfordshire. The Privy Council of Ireland ordered him to be paid 100 marks for his expenses in 1344. He was knighted before 1342 (a Parliamentary knight by then did not always receive this honour). In 1343 as Deputy Justiciar he implemented the Crown's grant to the citizens of Dublin for five years of the right of pavage i.e. the right to levy a toll for paving the streets.

== Reformer ==
As Justiciar he was charged by the King with implementing an ambitious programme of reform, which was prompted by numerous complaints of maladministration against Irish Crown officials. The programme was embodied in two Royal ordinances of 1341. It involved a thorough inquiry into all aspects of the Crown administration, investigating allegations of official corruption, abolition of unnecessary Crown offices, the wholesale replacement of Irish civil servants by Englishmen, preferably men of substance and property, the immediate collection of all Crown debts and the resumption of all grants of Crown lands since 1307 (although this was accompanied by a promise of just compensation for those deprived of their lands).

The programme has been described as "wholly unrealistic and largely impractical". When Morice sent a garbled report of the proposal to revoke Crown grants to the Exchequer, it aroused the fierce hostility of the Anglo-Irish ruling class, especially as, inexplicably, Morice failed to publicise the promise of compensation. He lacked either the ability or the stature to confront organised opposition, and his sacking of many of his Irish officials merely left him isolated, and the administration in chaos. Two sessions of the Parliament of Ireland, at Dublin and Kilkenny, made their opposition to the reforms clear, and its members sent a flood of petitions to King Edward III objecting to them. The King, judging the public mood correctly, speedily cancelled the Ordinances which embodied the programme. He proceeded to sack most of the Irish administration, apart from Morice himself, who retained a degree of favour, although his authority was seriously weakened.

His appointment has been described as a mistake which would not have been made in more settled times: despite his long record of service to the Crown, he was very much a second-rate man, who lacked influential family connections, and had no outstanding talents.

== Military campaigns ==
His lack of military ability, a necessary skill for any Justiciar of that time, was the cause of much harsh comment from the Anglo-Irish nobility. Nonetheless, he undertook a number of military expeditions against Irish clans who threatened the peace of the Pale in County Meath, and against the MacMurrough-Kavanagh dynasty, Kings of Leinster. There was also trouble with the Anglo-Irish nobility: Sir Risteárd de Tuit (a descendant of one of the original Anglo-Norman settlers who came to Ireland with Hugh de Lacy, Lord of Meath) was arrested on suspicion of treason. A far more powerful enemy, Maurice FitzGerald, 1st Earl of Desmond, was also imprisoned on charges of rebellion and had his lands forfeit: Morice was appointed seneschal of these lands. Desmond was eventually pardoned and recovered his lands. In 1346 Morice as Deputy Justiciar arranged the release of Maurice FitzGerald, 4th Earl of Kildare, who had been imprisoned on suspicion of conspiracy with Desmond. In the same year, he visited Westminster to confer with the King.

In the spring of 1346 the Justiciar, Sir Ralph d'Ufford, was so ill that his life was despaired of (the illness seems to have been a lengthy one). Morice, his Deputy, had been in attendance on the King, who sent a message by Morice to the Justiciar with instructions, but added the ominous comment "if he reaches him alive". Morice is unlikely to have reached D'Ufford while he lived, as he died at Kilmainham near Dublin on 9 April. Morice succeeded him as Justiciar for a time.

In August of that year, the King ordered Morice to take an inquisition from the "worthy gentleman" of County Waterford and County Tipperary concerning all felonies and trespasses committed there. Towards the end of the year he was summoned to England again.

== Recall ==
Despite the good intentions with which he came to Ireland, his government, whether as Chancellor or Justiciar, was clearly not a success: one historian has called him a second-rate civil servant who should never have been given high office, and his handling of the reform programme was disastrously inept. A plaintive letter written by him to the English Crown authorities survives, complaining of disturbances of the peace, the high price of grain and the public's hostility to him, and asking if he was entitled to act as Chancellor at all since his warrant of appointment had not arrived.

He was recalled to England in 1349 and died there in 1362. He married twice and had at least one son John.

== Portrait ==
He is portrayed in the Waterford Charter Roll of 1372/3: this is said to be the earliest portrait of an Irish or English judge. The portrait had a political purpose, as Morice had given a judgment upholding the privileges of the port of Waterford: the main purpose of the Charter Roll was to gain Royal favour for Waterford, at the expense of New Ross, and in particular to preserve its status as a royal port, which gave it the power to levy tolls. The Charter Roll is now on public display in the Waterford Museum of Treasures.

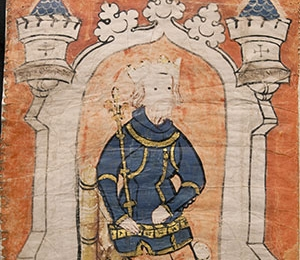
Waterford Charter Roll, showing the King; Morice is also portrayed in the Roll, said to be the earliest portrait of an Irish judge
