= Waterford Charter Roll =

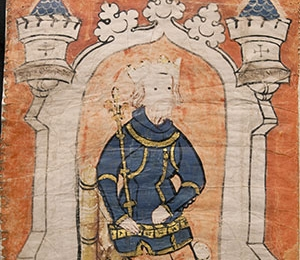
- Edward III on his throne, part of Waterford Charter Roll
- Year: 14th century
- Dimensions: 14 m (46 ft)
- Location: Waterford Museum of Treasures
- Website: www.waterfordtreasures.com/medieval-museum/whats-inside/the-great-charter-roll-of-waterford

Waterford Charter Roll is a historic legal document. It was created by the Anglo-Norman people of Waterford in the 14th century and its story shows us the power of English kings in Ireland through the medieval period to the 19th century. It is 4 m long and there are 17 individual drawings on the Roll.

It is dated to 1372/3 and is housed in the Waterford Museum of Treasures. It contains the earliest depiction of an Irish city from a time when Waterford wanted to maintain its status as the prominent trade city on the island of Ireland, particularly over neighbour New Ross.

Waterford was designated a Royal Port by Henry II and therefore could levy tolls. In a bid to gain favour with Edward III over New Ross, the Roll was drawn up in a pictorial and colourful style showing that the city had had relationships with kings going back centuries, kings that were ancestors of Edward. The king was persuaded by the Roll and reinstated Waterford's monopoly as a royal port.

The Roll is of historic significance as it contains the earliest contemporary portrait of a medieval English monarch, the earliest portrait of a judge (John Morice) in either Britain or Ireland, the earliest image of the medieval mayors of Dublin, Waterford, Cork and Limerick, and the earliest view of an Irish city.

In the mid-19th century, George Victor Du Noyer made a re-creation of the Waterford Charter Roll.

In 2010, a reproduction was made, discovering features that were not previously apparent.

During her visit to Ireland in 2011 Queen Elizabeth II viewed the Roll.
