= Irish Museum of Time =

Museum in Ireland

Coordinates: 52°15′38″N 7°06′24″W

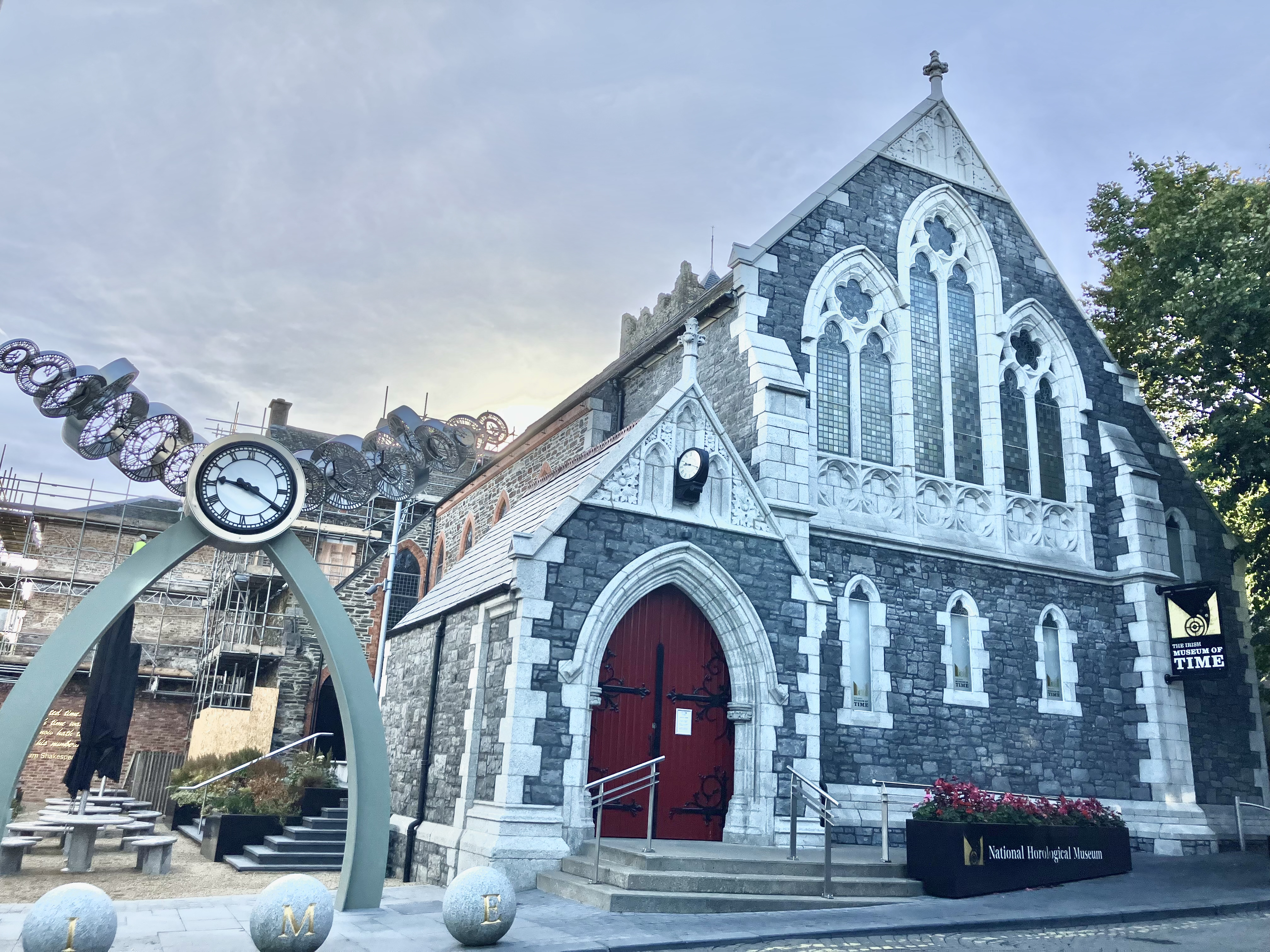
- The facade of the Irish Museum of Time and "Tempus Fugit", a winged clock. At the back, the adjoining Central Hall building as part of the expansion
- Established: 14 June 2021
- Location: Greyfriars Street, Waterford, the Republic of Ireland
- Type: Horology
- Website: https://www.waterfordtreasures.com/museum/the-museum-of-time/

The Irish Museum of Time is a horological museum in Waterford, the Republic of Ireland. It is situated in the Waterford Viking Triangle, an area with various historical sites and museums. It opened on 14 June 2021 and owns about 600 timepieces. It is a part of the Waterford Treasures, along with five other museums.

== History ==
Colman Curran and his wife Elizabeth Clooney decided to donate their collection of clocks, worth over 600,000 euros, to the Republic of Ireland, and Curran met Eamonn McEneaney, director of the Waterford Treasures, in 2015. They searched for the right place to house the collection for two years, and found a disused Methodist church at Greyfriars Street in the Viking Triangle. In 2018, another horologist, David Boles, also decided to donate his collection to this project. Due to the COVID-19 pandemic, it took longer to refurbish the building and the official opening of the museum was delayed.

On 14 June 2021, the Irish Museum of Time was officially opened, and Ireland's heritage minister Malcolm Noonan attended the opening ceremony.

On 22 December 2022, the day of the winter solstice, a large winged clock, "Tempus Fugit", was unveiled outside the museum. The clock was designed by artists Eithne Ring and Liam Lavery of Cork, and has two wings composed of seven steel dials on each side, spanning about six metres wide.

In March 2024, two museum staff members coordinated hundreds of clocks in the exhibition to prepare for the start of the daylight saving time in summer.

In May 2024, an expansion plan for the museum was revealed. A new gallery, audio-visual theatre, and workshop was set to open in early summer 2025 in the adjoining Central Hall building, which initially housed a Methodist church and later a theatre and arts venue. It will also contain a collection of antique cuckoo clocks. This world-class collection of over 600 cuckoo clocks and a Black Forest fairground organ were purchased for £1,000,000 in 2024 and come from the now closed Cuckooland Museum. Eventually, the refurbished Central Hall containing the cukoo clock exhibition was officially opened in March 2026.

== Exhibition ==
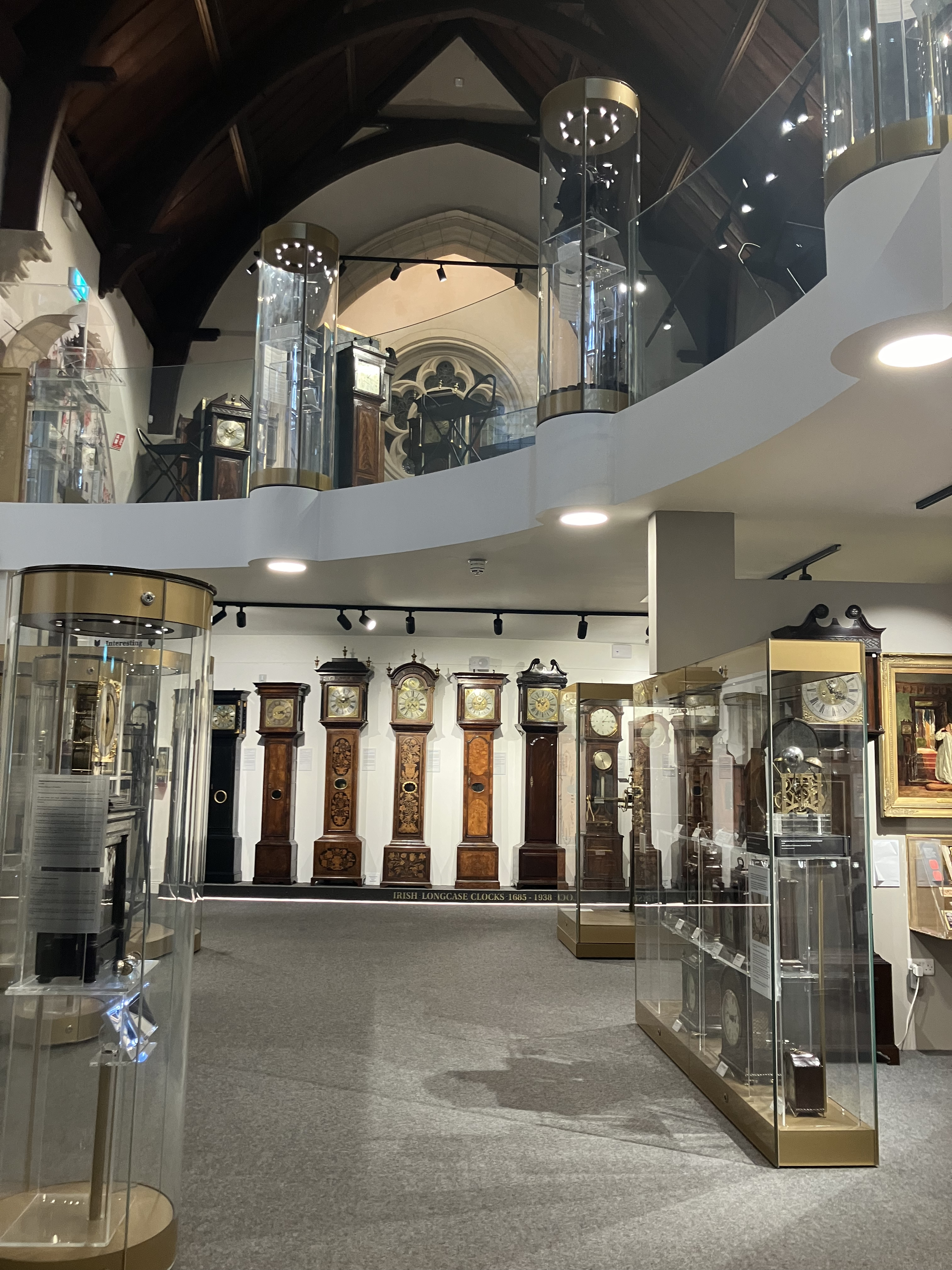
The ground floor of the museum

The museum houses the collections of two long-standing horologists in Ireland, David Boles and Colman Curran. It owns about 600 timepieces, and exhibits a number of clocks and watches on two floors, introducing various Irish clocks, as well as clocks from all over the world including the United States, the United Kingdom, Austria, Switzerland, France, Japan, and Russia. The oldest clock from the collection was made in 1551. It also owns William Clement's 1663 clock, the world's oldest surviving timepiece with an anchor escapement.

The building currently housing the museum is a refurbished Neo-Gothic church built in the 1880s. Many of the old clocks are exhibited with pieces of furniture from the same periods.

=== World's largest cuckoo clock exhibition ===
On 27th March 2026, the world's largest public exhibition of cuckoo clocks was officially opened, housed in a specially created wing of the museum, within a restored 19th-century building known as Central Hall, specifically in the so-called "David Boles Gallery". Minister John Cummins and Mayor of Waterford City & County, Seámus Ryan, attended the opening. On 28th March 2026, the museum reopened its doors, following a temporary closure to facilitate expansion works.

Thanks to the generosity of museum benefactor and co-founder David Boles, the collection was acquired in 2024 from brothers Roman and Maz Piekarski, who were closing their Cuckooland Museum in England, having collected cuckoo clocks for over 50 years. David Boles, also funded the restoration of the Central Hall building and the exhibition fit-out.

The exhibition comprises over 400 cuckoo clocks, many dating back to the 19th century, when the craft reached its artistic and technical peak. Many of the clocks were cleaned and treated by expert conservators, same as a century-old fairground organ in the exhibition, which was also restored.

== Reception ==
The Irish Museum of Time is the only horological museum in Ireland. It is Ireland's national horological museum. The museum has become a tourist destination. In 2024, along with the nearby Bishop's Palace, it was recognised by Tripadvisor's Travellers' Choice Awards.

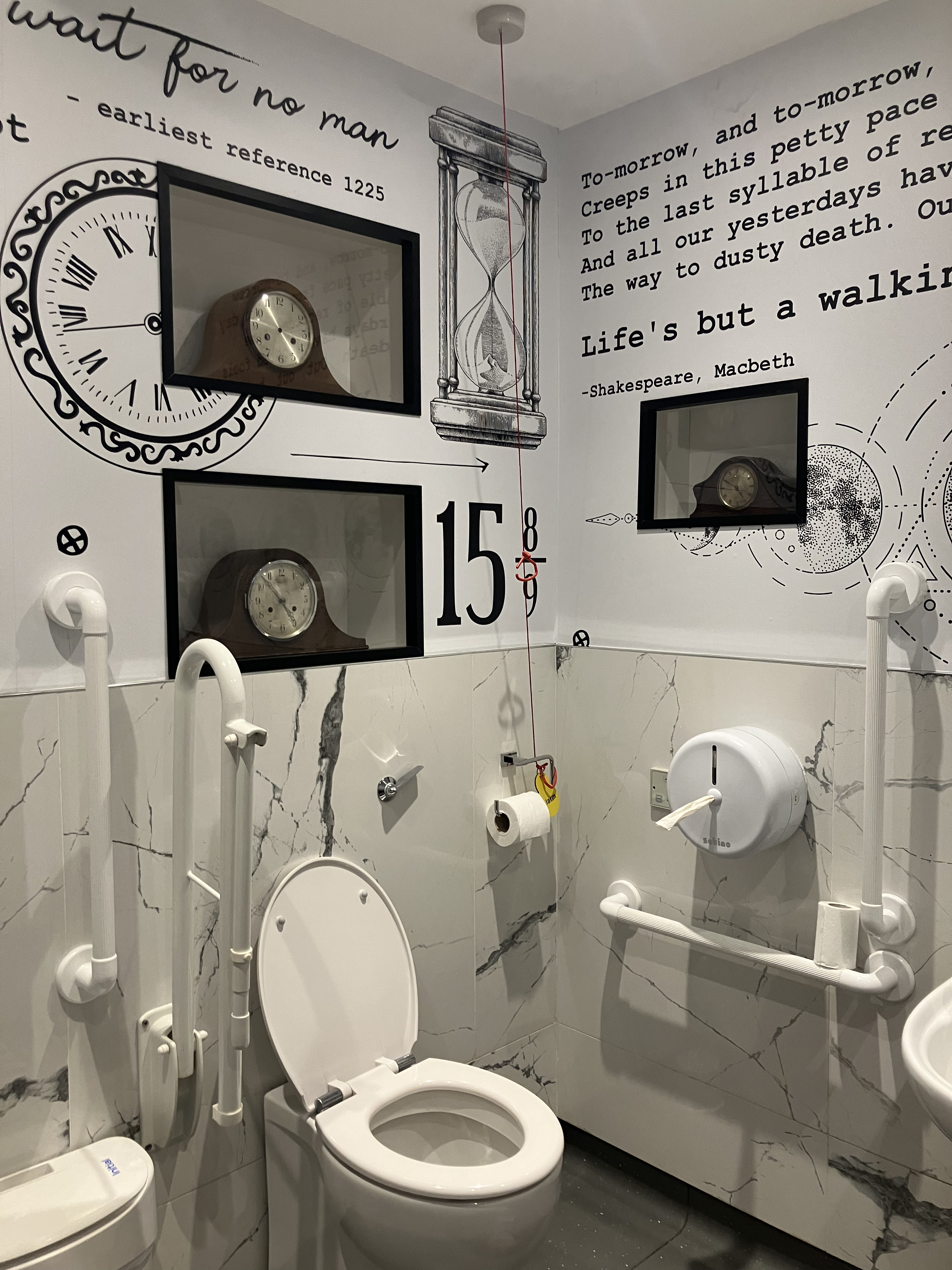
The "Interesting Horological Restroom", or an exhibition in the bathroom

== The Waterford Treasures ==
Along with Reginald's Tower, the Medieval Museum, the Bishop's Palace, the Irish Silver Museum, and the Irish Wake Museum, it is a component of the Waterford Treasures. The Waterford Treasures issues the Freedom of Waterford ticket, which allows visitors to enter the Irish Museum of Time, the Medieval Museum, the Bishop's Palace, and the Irish Silver Museum, and to participate in a guided walk around the Viking Triangle.
