= Cuckooland Museum =

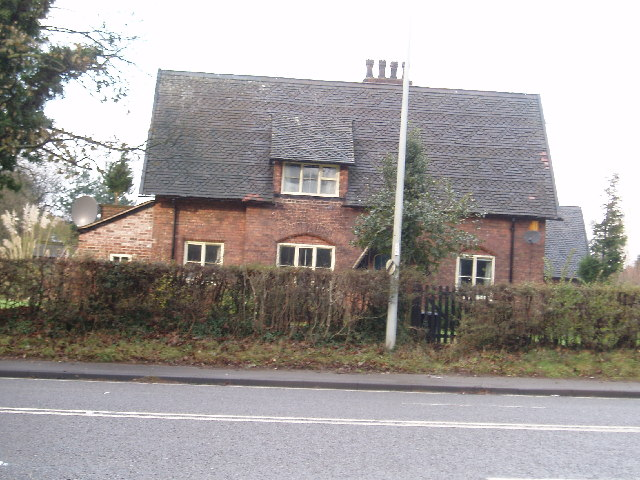

- Location within Cheshire
- Established: 1990
- Location: The Nether Tabley Old School, Chester Road, Tabley (Knutsford), WA16 0HL, England, UK
- Coordinates: 53.2947°N 2.4237°W
- Type: Horological museum
- Collection size: Over 600 cuckoo clocks
- Director: Roman Piekarski
- Website: www.cuckoolandmuseum.com

The Cuckooland Museum, previously known as the Cuckoo Clock Museum, was a private museum that exhibited mainly cuckoo clocks (as well as a few Black Forest fairground organs, English motorbikes and some other items), housed in the Nether Tabley Old School, Cheshire, England. The collection comprised over 150 years of cuckoo clock-making history, since the 19th to the early 21st century.

== Foundation, Closure and Relocation ==
The museum was set up in 1990 by brothers Roman and Maz Piekarski, who moved to live in the premises in 1989, after bringing together a collection of antique clocks and Black Forest cuckoo clocks, the latter was continuously increased until the museum's final years.

Both men were trained as clockmakers in Manchester from the age of 15, which is when their fascination with cuckoo clocks began. In Roman Piekarski's own words: When we started collecting in the 1970s no one wanted them because battery and electric clocks were all the rage. We picked many up for next to nothing.

It became apparent to them that an important part of European clock-making history was liable to disappear if surviving examples fell into irretrievable disrepair. Their motivation to establish a dedicated museum stemmed from a desire to preserve the Black Forest cuckoo clock craftsmanship, recognizing its cultural and historical significance.

As a private museum without public funding, it faced ongoing challenges in maintenance and operations. Without an inheritor, the single brothers feared the collection might be auctioned and dispersed, prompting them to explore alternatives to preserve their life's work.

In January 2024, facing challenges such as lack of heirs, advancing age, Roman Piekarski's illness (who died in June 2024) and years of visitor declines, the collection was sold for £1,000,000. In 2024, it was relocated to Ireland to be exhibited in the Irish Museum of Time, wherein over 400 cuckoo clocks (and a fairground organ) are on display in an extension officially opened in March 2026.

== The collection ==
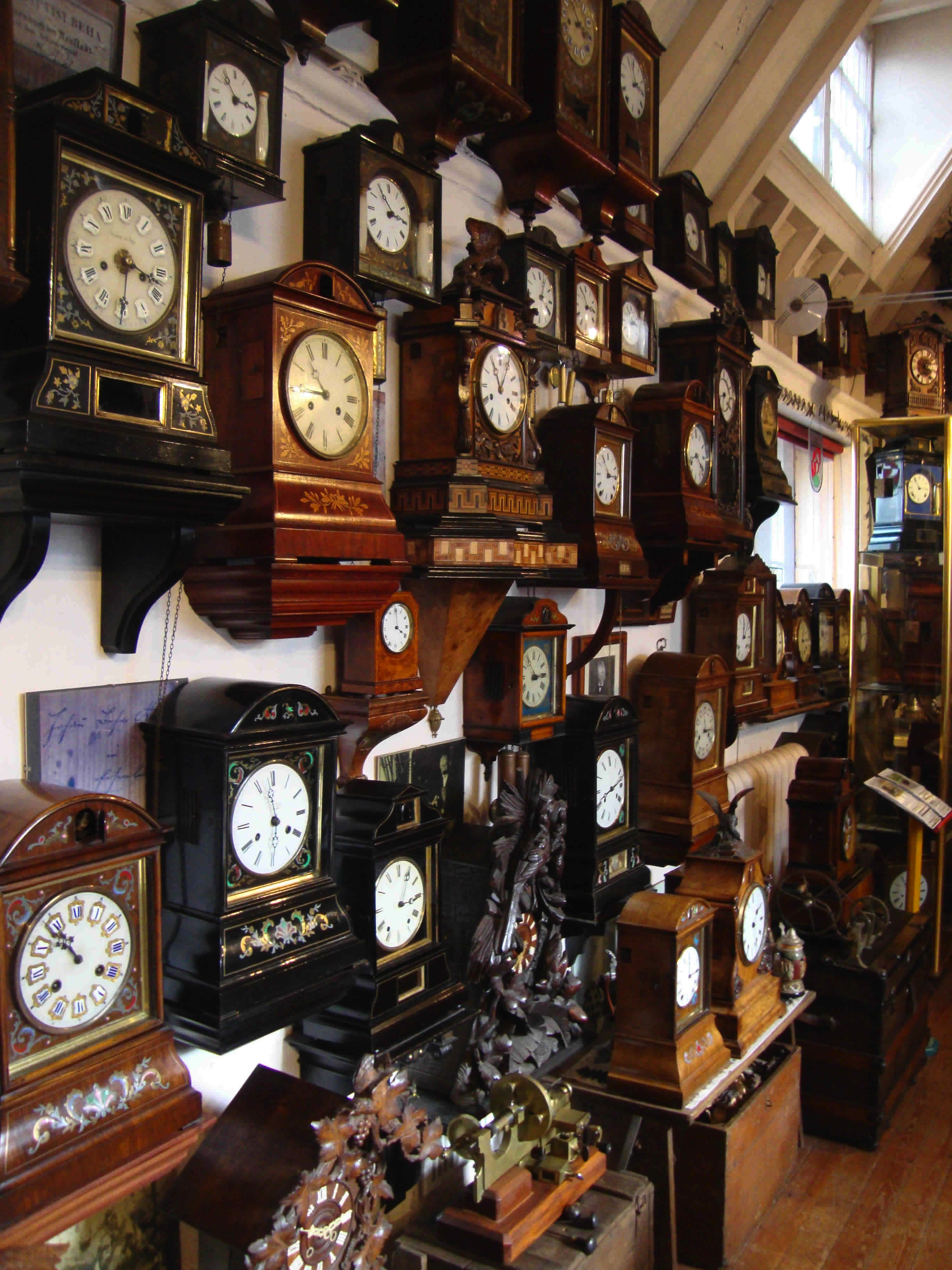
Antique cuckoo clocks exhibited in the museum.

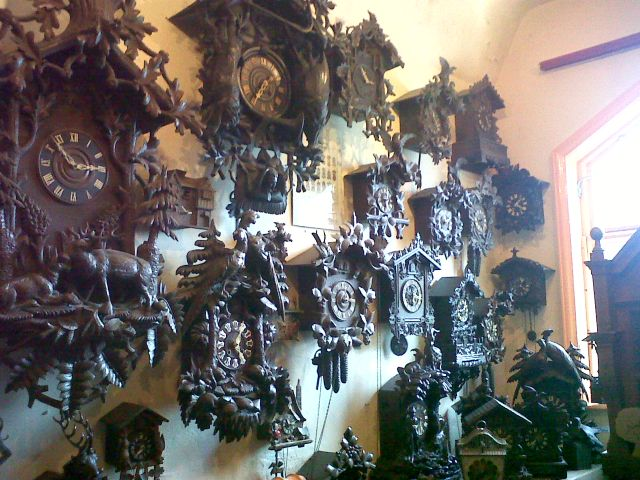
Some of the cuckoo clocks displayed at the defunct museum.

In its early years as a museum, the horological exhibition also included other kind of timepieces such as longcase, wall and bracket clocks, but later on it focused on cuckoo clocks.

The museum also hosted a range of Black Forest cuckoo and quail clocks, trumpeter clocks, monks playing bells and other associated musical movements.

Cuckooland came to have over 600 cuckoo clocks of different styles, ages and manufacturers. The collection contained some of the best examples of the cuckoo clockmaker's art:

- A "cuckoo and echo" clock that emulates the whistles and bellows the bird makes in the wild and is thought to be one of only six in the world.
- Timepieces by Johann Baptist Beha, one of the most reputed Black Forest cuckoo clockmaker of all times.
- Examples in Art Nouveau and other unusual styles.
- Picture frame cuckoo clocks, timepieces with a life size automaton cuckoo bird on top of the case, cuckoos with paintings of people or animals with blinking or flirty eyes, designer cuckoo clocks, etc.

== See also ==
- Automaton
- Clock
- Horology
- List of museums in Cheshire

Similar museums

- Deutsches Uhrenmuseum
- Dorf- und Uhrenmuseum Gütenbach
- Museum fũr Uhren und Mechanische Musik
