= Museum of Timekeeping and Mechanical Musical Instruments =

Museum near Thun, Switzerland

Coordinates: 46.7285°N 7.6717°E

The Museum of Timekeeping and Mechanical Musical Instruments (German: Museum für Uhren und mechanische Musikinstrumente, MUMM) is a museum in the village of Oberhofen am Thunersee, Switzerland, in the Bernese Oberland. It is dedicated to both horology and mechanical music.

The museum is about halfway between the major tourist centers of Bern and Interlaken, and housed in the manor house of the historic Wichterheer estate, on the shore of Lake Thun.

The core of the museum's collection consists of two formerly private collections owned by Hans-Peter Hertig (clocks) and Kurt Matter (mechanical music). The collection is particularly strong in early rustic clocks from the Bernese region of Switzerland, and in beggars' organs and Swiss-made comb music boxes. The museum can only be visited by guided tour.

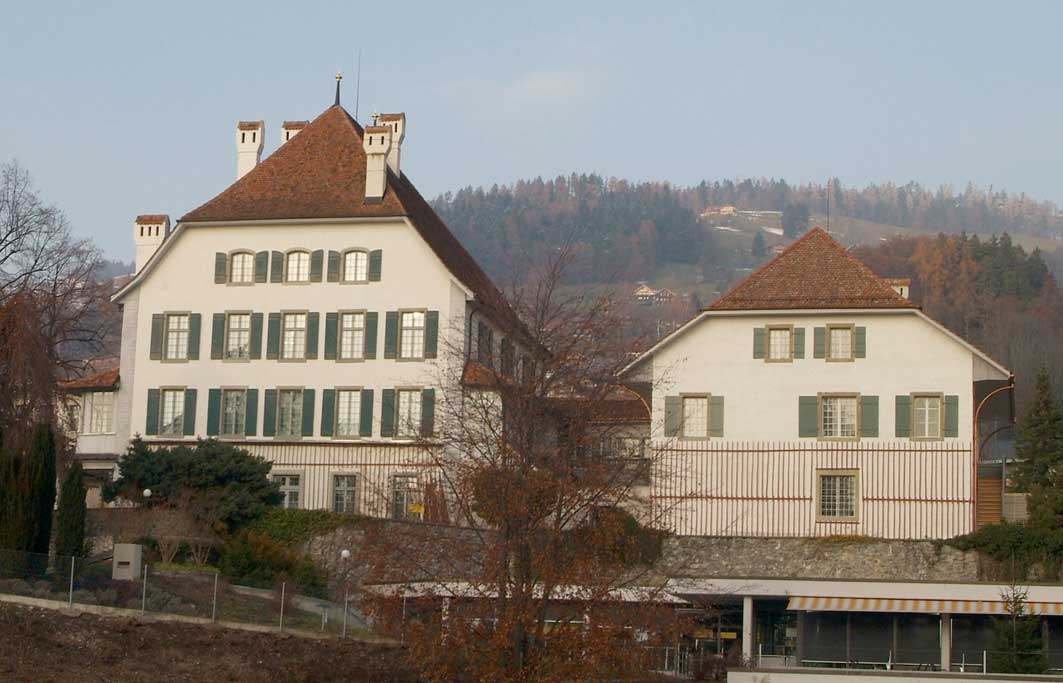
Wichterheer estate

== See also ==
- Horology
- List of music museums

Similar museums:

- British Horological Institute
- Deutsches Uhrenmuseum
- Irish Museum of Time
- National Watch and Clock Museum
- Mussee Internationale d'Horlogerie
- Royal Observatory, Greenwich
