= Waterford Treasures =

Group of museums in the city of Waterford, Ireland

Waterford Treasures (group of museums)

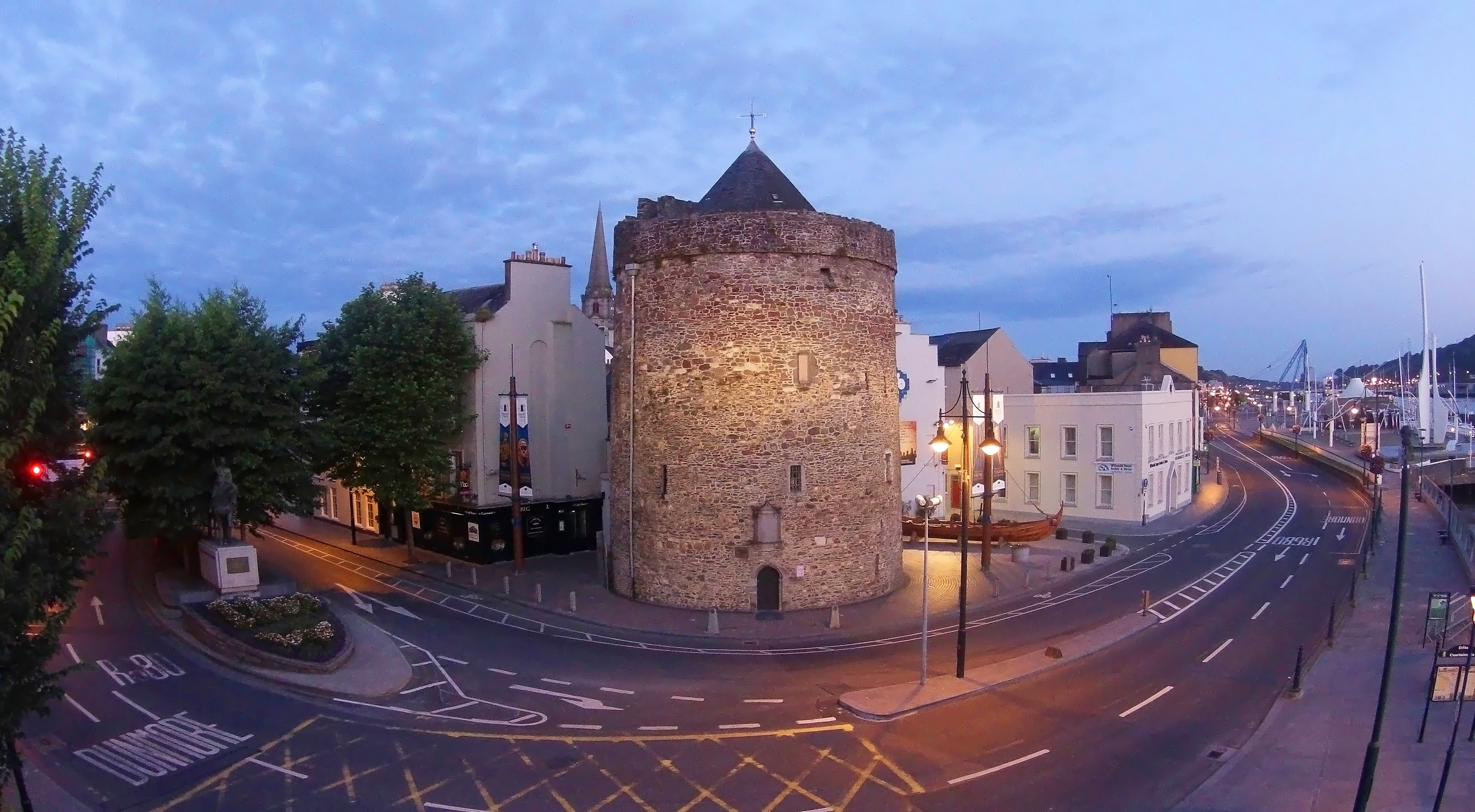
- Reginald's Tower

- Location within Ireland
- Established: 1982
- Location: The Mall, Waterford, Ireland
- Coordinates: 52.259996°N 7.106542°W
- Type: history museum
- Public transit access: The Mall bus stop (Bus Éireann routes 601, 603, 605)
- Parking: Bolton Street
- Website: waterfordtreasures.com

Waterford Treasures is a group of museums in and related to the city of Waterford in Ireland. It consists of four entities branded as museums (the Medieval Museum, Irish Silver Museum, Irish Museum of Time, Irish Wake Museum) and a historic building, the former Bishop's Palace, all located in adjacent, and another historic building, Reginald's Tower, which contains the Waterford Viking Museum. All these are located in the Viking Triangle. The collections includes the 14th Century Waterford Charter Roll. Associated with Waterford Treasures are a cafe, and the Epic Walking Tour and the King of the Vikings Virtual Reality Adventure.

== Constituent museums and buildings ==
=== Medieval Museum ===
The Medieval Museum includes two medieval chambers, the 13th century Choristers’ Hall and the 15th century Mayor's Wine Vault. It also contains the only surviving piece of clothing worn by Henry VIII, a cap of maintenance. This was awarded to the Mayor of Waterford, along with a bearing sword, in 1536.

=== Irish Museum of Time ===
The Irish Museum of Time, a museum of clocks, opened on 14 June 2021.

=== Irish Silver Museum ===
The Irish Silver Museum opened on 24 June 2021.

=== Irish Wake Museum ===
The Irish Wake Museum, a museum focusing on the death and wake, opened on 15 June 2023.

=== Bishop's Palace ===
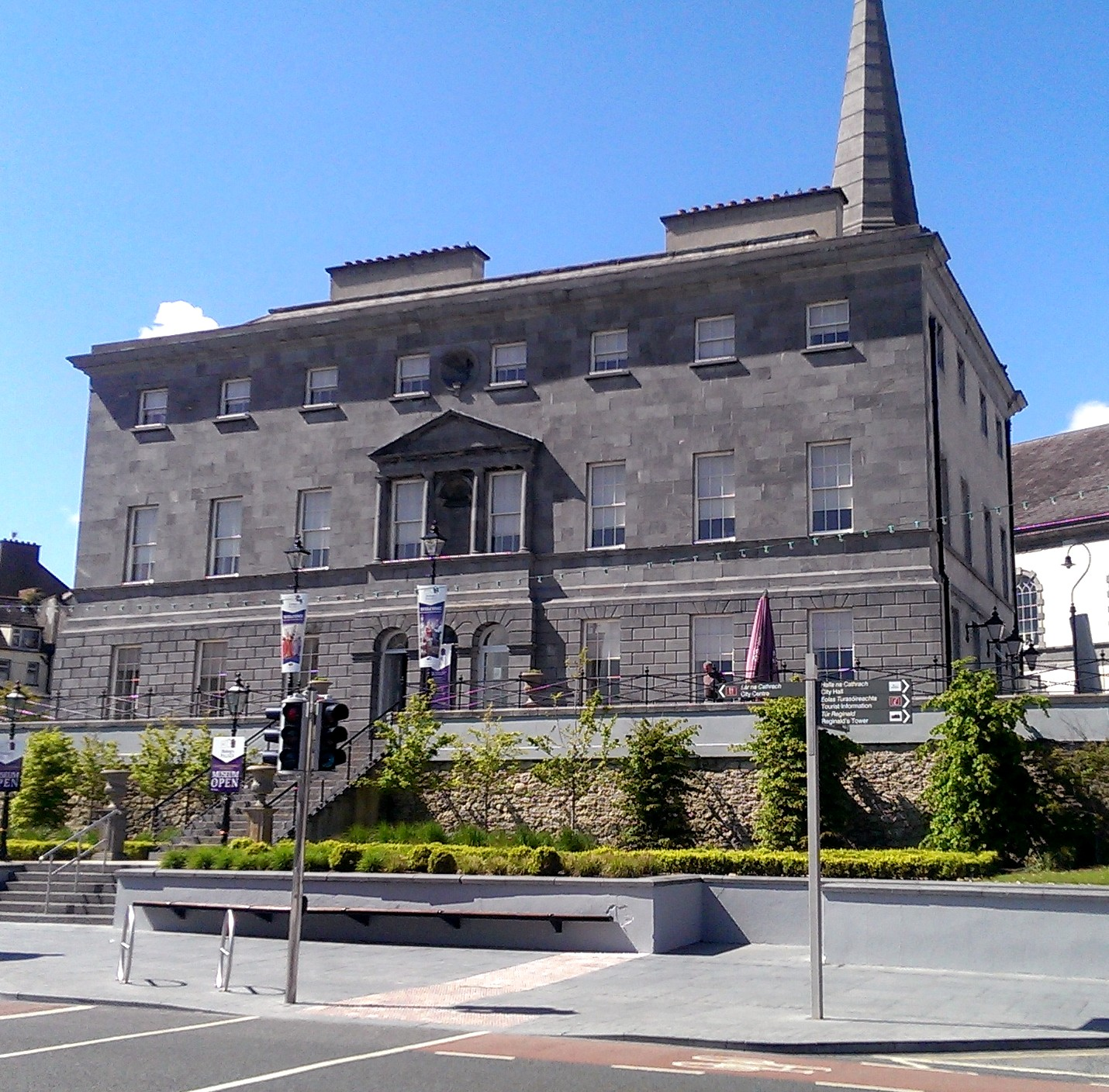
Bishop's Palace Museum, Waterford

The Bishop's Palace is a 250-year-old Georgian structure and contains artifacts dating from 17th century Waterford to the present day. The Anglo-German architect Richard Cassels initially designed the Bishop's Palace, which was constructed in 1741. However, construction was completed by the architect John Roberts. The museum was originally the residence of the Church of Ireland Bishop of Waterford.

The museum tells the story of Waterford from 1700 to the 1970s and contains the only surviving Bonaparte 'mourning cross' which was one of 12 produced upon Napoleon Bonaparte's death in 1821.

The oldest surviving piece of Waterford Crystal, a Penrose decanter, is also on exhibition which dates back to 1789.

The top floor of the building is dedicated to stories specific to Waterford's history, such as Ballybricken's pig markets, Waterford's Home Rule story, some exhibits on Waterford during the First World War, the War of Independence in Waterford, childhood and household living in Waterford.

=== Reginald's Tower (with Viking Museum) ===
Reginald's Tower is the oldest building in civic use in Ireland and is said to date from 1003 A.D. The Viking Museum contains a volume of artifacts.

== Other attractions ==
Waterford Treasures runs the King of the Vikings Virtual Reality Adventure at the French Church. It also provides the Epic Walking Tour, a guided walk around the Viking Triangle. There is also a cafe.

== Awards ==
Waterford Treasures has received several awards, including a nomination in the international category of the 2013 "Museums and Heritage Awards".
