= Spraoi =

- Location: Waterford, Ireland
- Website: spraoi.com

Spraoi (pron. "spree") is a festival of international street theatre and world music which takes place for three days each August in the Irish city of Waterford. The festival takes its name from the Irish word spraoi meaning 'play'. The Waterford Spraoi has taken place each summer since 1992 and is now the largest festival event in Waterford. The main activities are centred on two main stages located in the John Roberts Square and William Vincent Wallace Plaza where various acts have been hosted including the Royal Drummers of Burundi and the Ukulele Orchestra of Great Britain, as well as more contemporary bands and musicians.

The Spraoi is a professional event that is also supported by more than 300 volunteers. The festival has previously attracted audiences of over 80,000 to see events in music, art installations, storytelling, circus skills workshops, science and others.
