= Waterford Viking Triangle =

- Open Street Map of area

- Waterford location in Ireland
- 52°15′20″N 007°07′00″W
- Nearest city: Waterford, Ireland

History
- Founded: 914 A.D.
- Founder: Vikings

Site notes
- Area: 1 square mile
- Website: Viking Triangle

The Waterford Viking Triangle is part of the cultural and heritage area in Waterford City. It is so called because of the 1000-year-old Viking walls which once surrounded it. The sites within the "triangle" include Reginald's Tower (which contains the Viking Museum) as well as the Medieval Museum and the Bishop's Palace Museum, collectively known as Waterford Museum of Treasures.

== Sites ==
=== Reginald's Tower ===
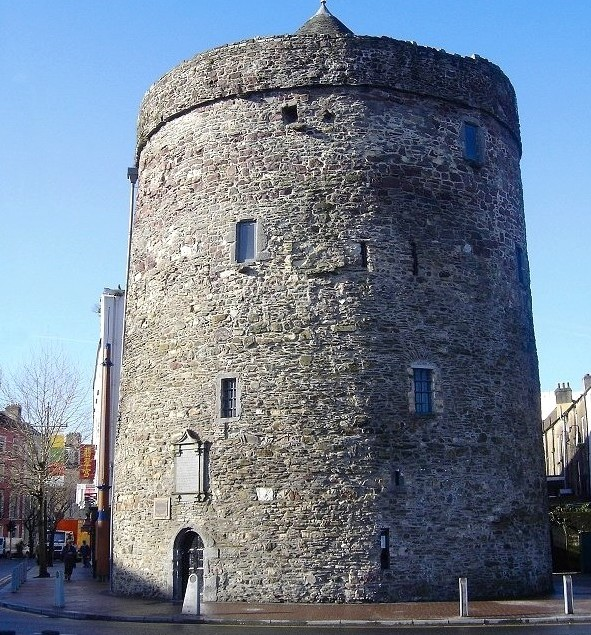
Reginald's Tower

The best-known building in the Viking Triangle is Reginald's Tower, the oldest urban civic building in Ireland, situated on the Quays/The Mall, in Waterford. It has performed various functions over the years and today is a civic museum.

=== Waterford Crystal ===
The Waterford Crystal factory and showroom are on The Mall, which is just to the south of the Triangle. Guided tours are available for the factory.

=== Waterford Treasures ===
There are three museums in the Viking Triangle - collectively known as Waterford Museum of Treasures. The Viking Museum is housed in Reginald's Tower. The Medieval Museum and Bishop's Palace Museum are close to Cathedral Square.

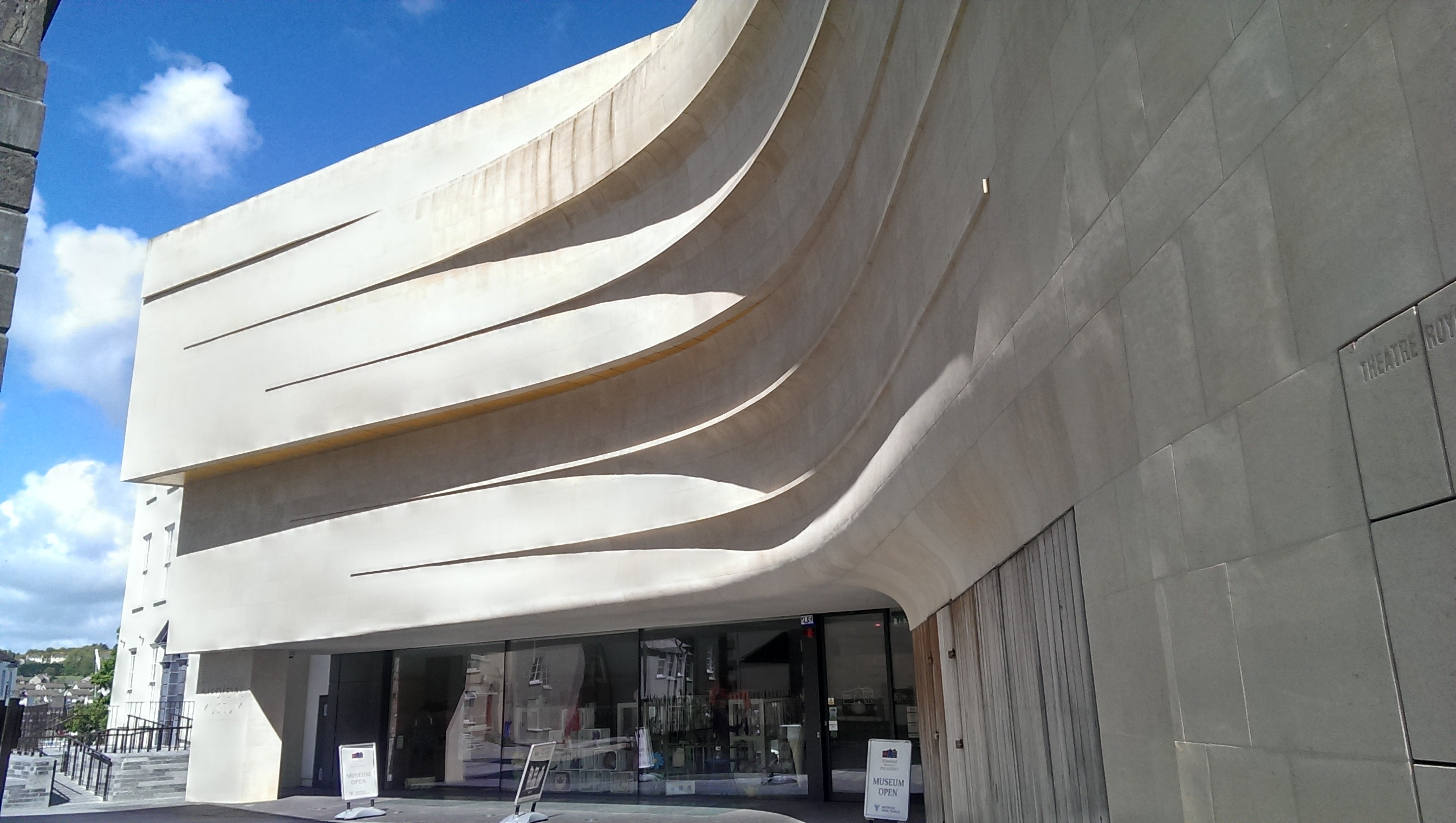
Medieval Museum, Waterford

The Medieval Museum includes two medieval chambers, the 13th-century Choristers’ Hall and the 15th-century Mayor’s Wine Vault. The only piece of clothing from Henry VIII, a cloth cap, is housed in the museum.

The Bishop's Palace Museum is a 250-year-old Georgian structure and contains artefacts dating from 17th century Waterford to the present.

=== French Church ===
Another monument, on Bailey's New St./Greyfriars, is the French Church (Greyfriars Abbey), a friary dating from the 13th century.

=== Other sites ===
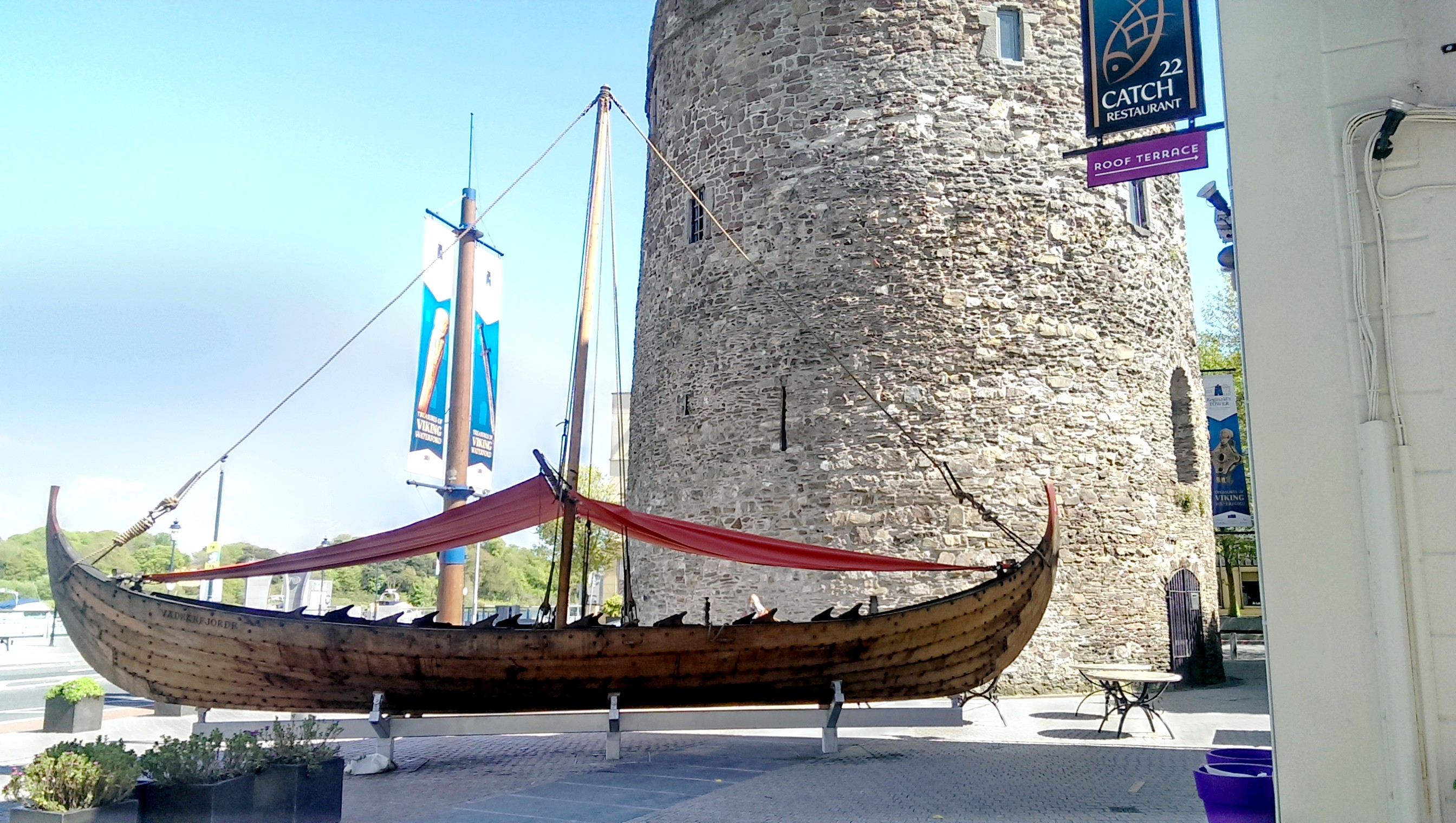
Viking longship at Reginald's Tower, Waterford

A replica Viking longship is exhibited beside Reginald's Tower. This vessel is 12 metres (39 feet) in length. It was built by a local shipwright and sailed locally before going to its present exhibition space on Parade Quay. Cathedral Square is the site of Christchurch Cathedral; nearby is the Theatre Royal and other historical landmarks. The Mall (close to Waterford Crystal) is the building where Thomas Francis Meagher held meetings and which first saw the Irish Tricolour flag in 1848.
