= People's Park, Waterford =

Public park in Waterford, Ireland

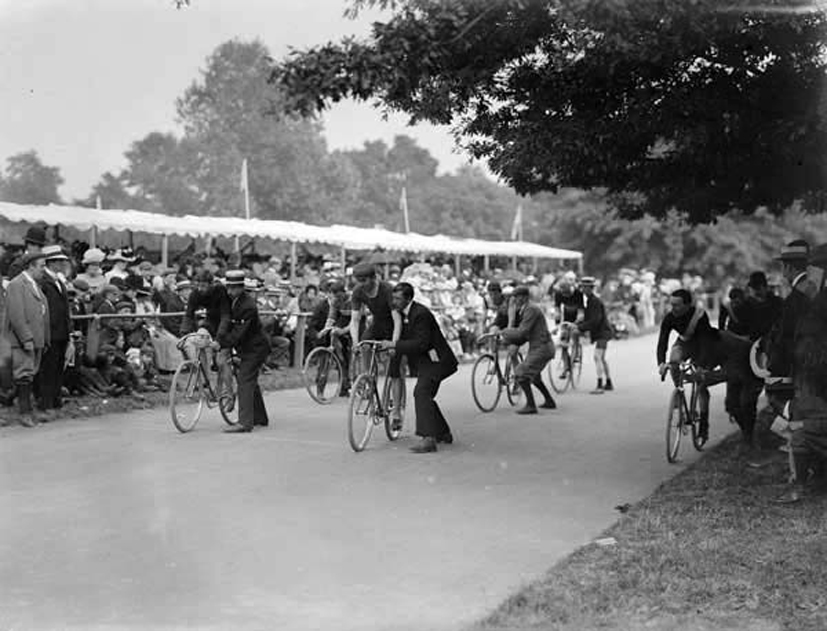
- Bicycle race in the People's Park, 1901
- Interactive map of People's Park, Waterford
- Coordinates: 52.256°N 7.105°W

The People's Park is the largest public park in Waterford, Ireland. Laid out in the 19th century, it is 6.6 hectares (16.3 acres) in size. It is located at the junction of the Park Road and William Street. The site of the People's Park was originally a marshland which John's River ran through, however in 1857 the river was diverted, and the marshland drained to make way for the construction of the park.

The park hosted Ireland's first ever velodrome, known as the Goff cycle track, from 1891. The park also contains a Victorian-era bandstand, two children's playgrounds and an iron bridge connecting the park to the grounds of the Court House. The park was renovated and upgraded in 2022 and 2024. The former caretaker's house, at the gate of the park, was renovated, and a small extension added, with the Park Lodge café now occupying the structure. A baby playground area was also built.

In May 2011, the Victorian bandstand was vandalised, with the structure pulled down and many of the ornate wrought iron railings surrounding it being damaged. Gardaí later arrested several people on suspicion that they may have been responsible. The damage was promptly repaired by the engineering department of Waterford City Council.

== Bibliography ==
- Power, Dermot (1996), "A history of the People's Park" (PDF), Decies, 52: 113–144
