= Royal Port =

Specially designated port by a monarch

A Royal Port is a port that has been granted a 'royal' designation by a monarch. In England, historically this designation allowed the port to receive certain goods and collect certain associated taxes.

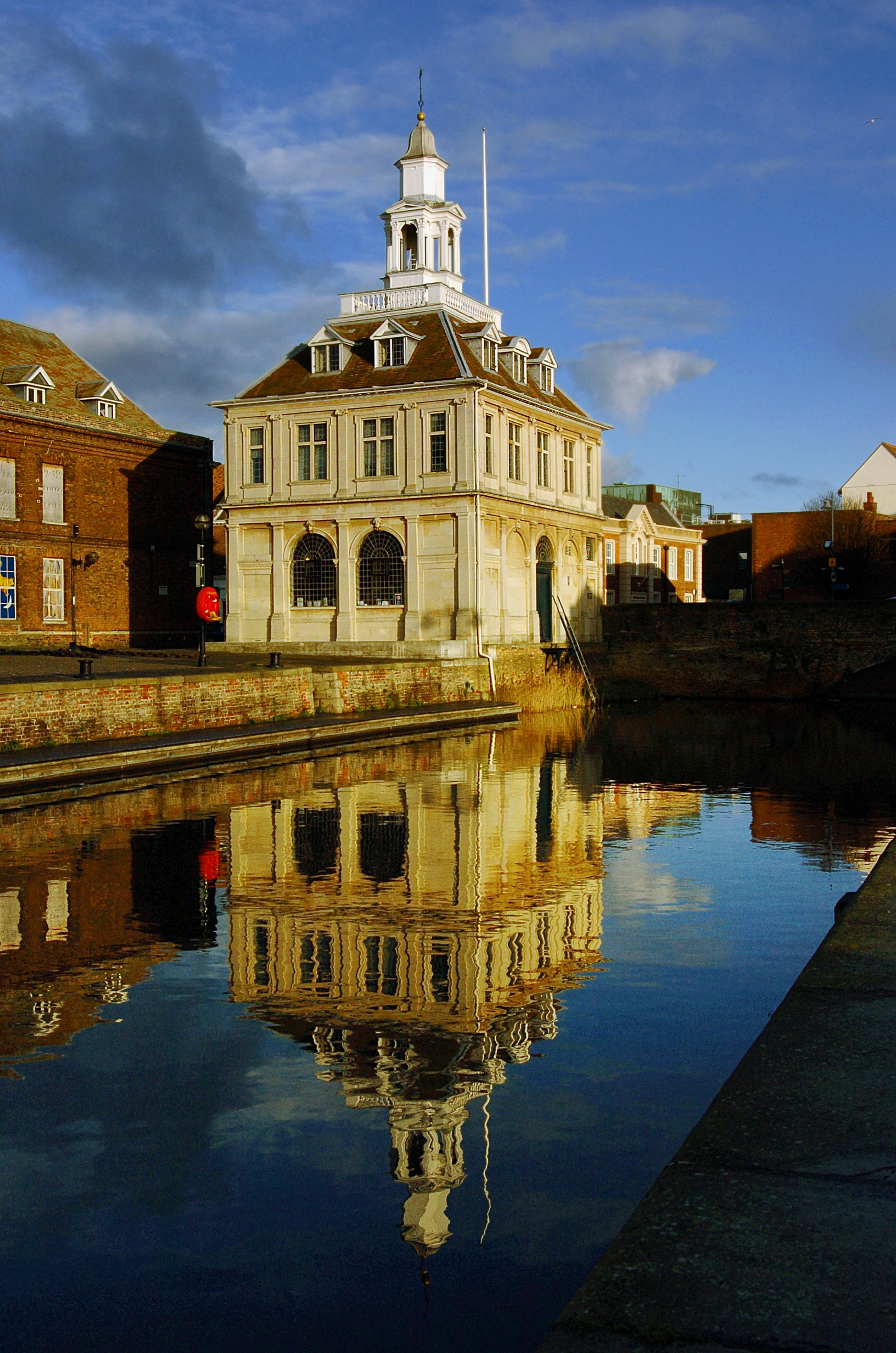
The 17th century Customs House in the Royal Port of King's Lynn

== History ==
During the medieval era's manorial system, Royal Ports were the direct property of the King, who would issue the port with special rights, customs and privileges, usually via a charter. Only those designated as royal ports could receive goods such as wine, and collect the associated royal tax on the imported goods on behalf of the king. These tolls or "customs" on imported or exported goods formed one of the oldest prerogatives enjoyed by Kings of England. The king would appoint Royal Port Reeves to collect the tolls. Ports that did not hold Royal status are historically called franchise ports.

The Kings of England designated Royal Ports in Ireland, such as Dublin, as part of their conquest. Perhaps one of the most famous examples would be linked to the Waterford Charter Roll, which resulted in the re-designation of Waterford as a Royal Port. Waterford had been designated as a royal port by Henry II, however nearby New Ross became a competing Port. In a bid to gain favour with Edward III over New Ross, the Roll was drawn up in a pictorial and colourful style showing that the city had had relationships with kings going back centuries. The king was persuaded by the Roll and reinstated Waterford's monopoly as a royal port.

Some were planned to deliberately compete with franchise ports not owned by the King. For example, Liverpool, was founded to compete with the port of Chester. King John wanted to turn Liverpool into a Royal Port as it offered a natural sheltered harbour, close to royal estates from which supplies could be withdrawn for military purposes as part of his conquest of Ireland. Chester may have been equally well suited for this, but it was a county palatine for the Earl's of Chester and therefore returned no profits to the crown.

Often Royal Ports formed parts of confederations that granted them additional rights and privileges, such as Winchelsea which was part of the Cinque Ports or King's Lynn which formed part of the Hanseatic League.

The framework for customs in the Royal Ports was set by the exchequer from as early as 1275. By 1347 the customs system, as it was to operate in the royal ports throughout the later Middle Ages was completed (excluding subsidies of tunnage on wine and poundage on general merchandise, which would be grafted on to the customs from about the middle of the fourteenth century).

The Port of Barrow was granted the title of "Royal" on 22 September 2025 by King Charles III, to reflect the town's contribution to national security.

== See also ==
- HM Customs
- List of place names with Royal Patronage
- Royal Charter
