= John's River =

River located in Ireland

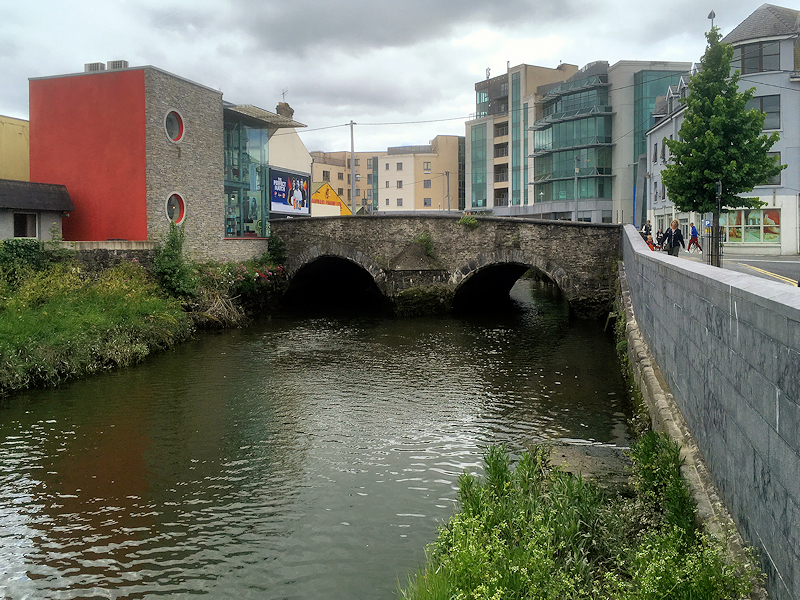
- John's Bridge, spanning John's River, in Waterford city
- Native name: Abhainn Naomh Eoin (Irish)

Physical characteristics
- Source
  - location: Tramore Marshes
- Mouth: River Suir
  - location: Adelphi Quay, Waterford Harbour
- Length: 6 km (3.7 mi)
- Basin size: 10 km^{2} (3.9 sq mi)
- Discharge
  - average: 0.01 m^{3}/s (0.35 cu ft/s)

John's River or St. John's River is a small river that snakes its way through Waterford city before joining the River Suir at Adelphi Quay, Ireland.

== Course ==
The river rises in the marshland that stretches from the southern extremities of the city towards Tramore. It is first discernible in the environs of the pitch and putt course on the Tramore Road, between the course and the Regional Sports Centre. Another large stream passes between the course and Ursuline Court, along which stretch is a pedestrian walkway. This stream joins the main river in the apex between the Inner Ring Road and the Tramore Road, behind the Westgate Retail Park. Before reaching this point, the main river weaves its way through the commercial area between the Inner Ring, Tramore and Cork roads.

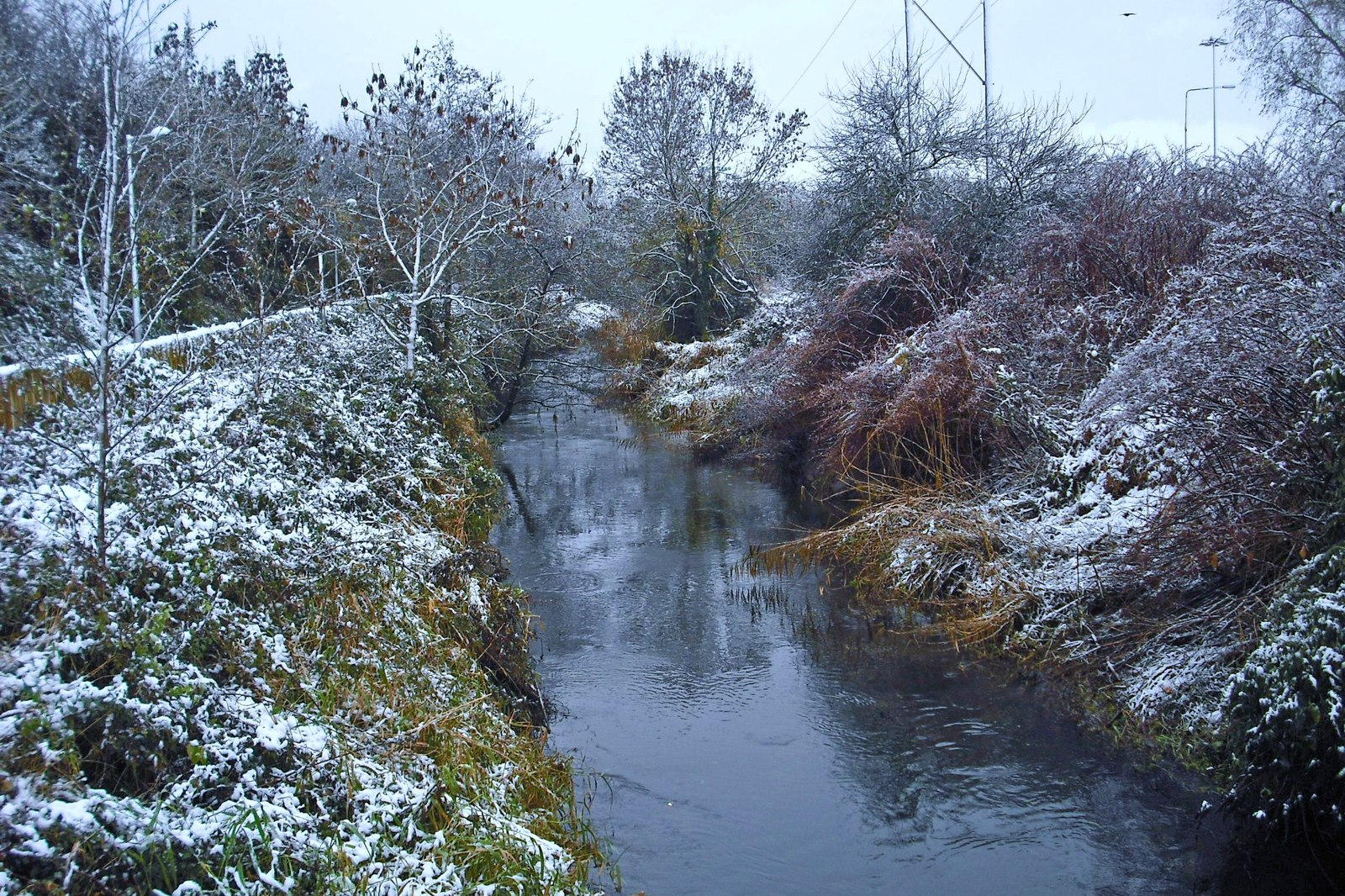
John's River, near Ursuline Court, in Ballytruckle townland

From the confluence of the main streams, the river passes for a stretch behind the Tramore Road Business Park until it is fed by another stream at the Gaelic Park. From here it begins to snake, first under Bath Street in Poleberry, past the Bohemians club sports ground, and under a bridge in the vicinity of the Tesco supermarket. It then runs the length of the Railway Square complex, with Miller's Marsh to the right, before turning and moving under John's Bridge, and on to the Waterside. By this point the river has become considerable, and requires non-trivial bridging. It is also tidal from at least this point.

The Waterside portion of the river is flanked on its left by a quiet and leafy street. Along this section, it is spanned by a pedestrian footbridge leading to the former gas works site, the bridge having fallen into disrepair. The river then passes under Hardy's bridge before it meanders between the People's Park and the city court house. Along this section it is spanned by a painted iron footbridge, linking the grounds of the court house to the park.

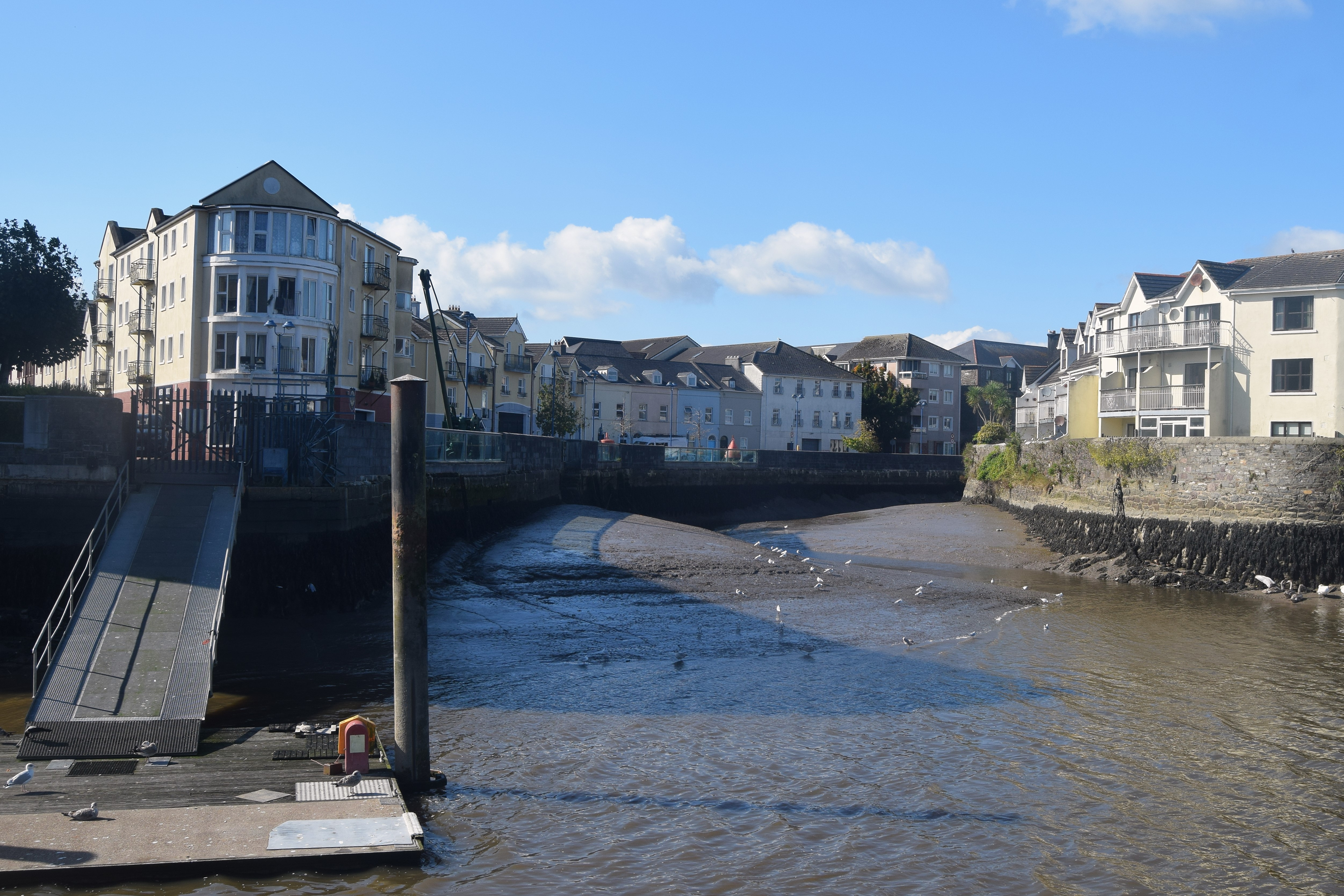
Mouth of John's River where it meets the River Suir

Ultimately, the river moves under a bridge at Lombard Street, before broadening out between Scotch and Adelphi quays, where small boats are moored. This section of the river is spanned by a footbridge between Scotch and Adelphi quays, below which it joins the River Suir.

== History ==
Historically, the rough area between the quays, the People's Park, Catherine Street and The Mall was marshland, which gave way to what was known as The Pill. The Pill was a pool of water, fed by John's River. It was drained, along with the surrounding marshland, in the late 18th century by the Wide Streets Commission, in order to build the Mall, and to expand the city eastwards. From this point on, the river had well defined banks all the way to the Suir.

== Pollution ==
The river was described as "seriously polluted along most of its length" in a 2011 report.

== See also ==
- List of rivers of Ireland
