= French Church, Waterford =

Ruined church in Waterford, Ireland

Coordinates: 52°15′38″N 7°06′24″W

The French Church
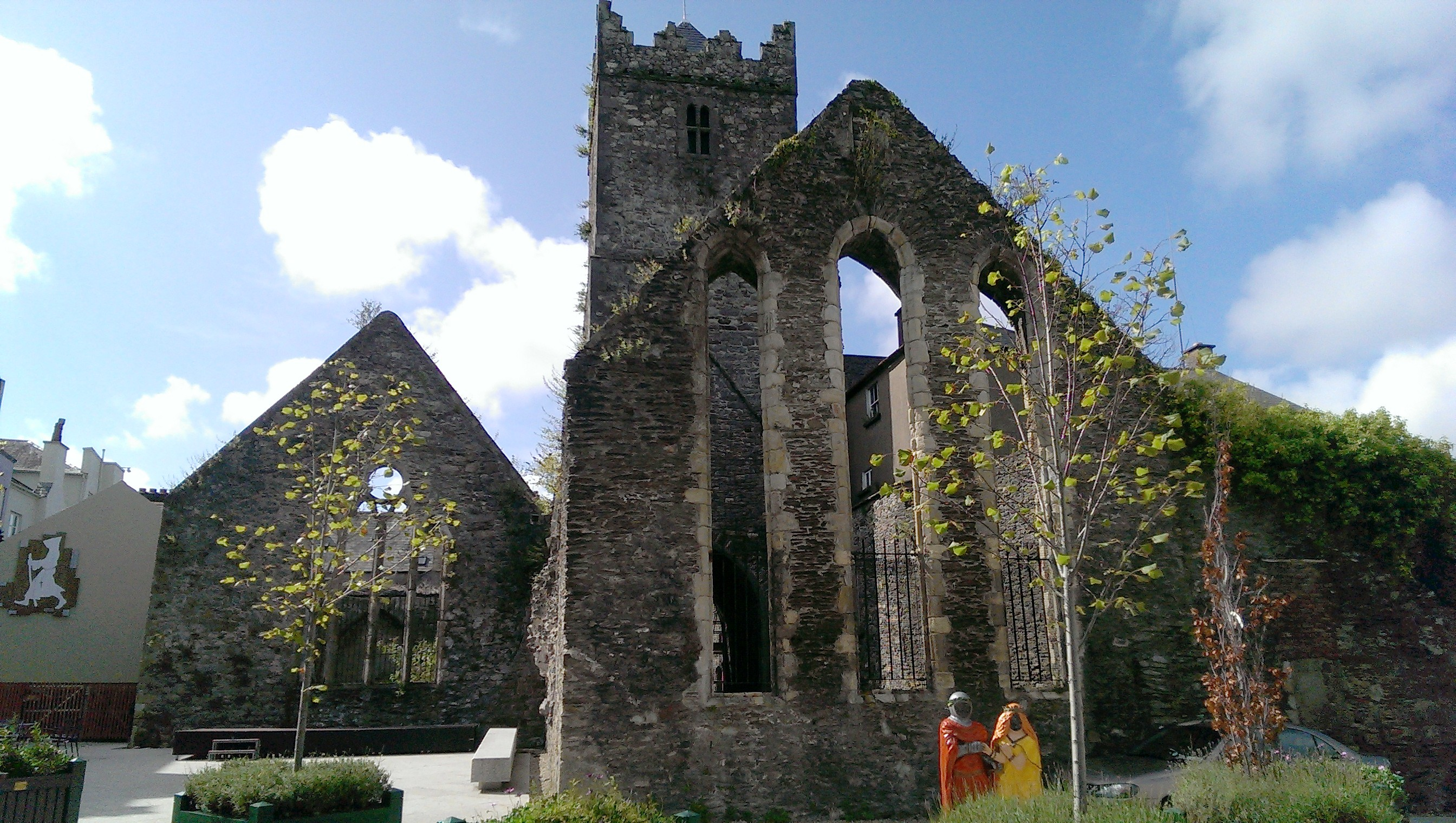
- French Church, Waterford
- Interactive map of The French Church

Monastery information
- Order: Franciscans
- Established: 1241
- Disestablished: 1541

Architecture
- Status: Inactive

Site
- Public access: Yes

The French Church, also known as Greyfriars Abbey, is a former Franciscan friary which was built in 1241 on what is now Greyfriars and Baileys New Street, Waterford in Ireland. At the entrance to the ancient church stands a monument to Luke Wadding, a seventeenth-century Waterford-born priest. This friary was one of the first to be built in Ireland, being founded by the Anglo-Norman Knight Sir Hugh Purcell.

== Richard II ==
In 1394 Richard II lodged in the church while making plans for his assault on the Irish clans in the Wicklow Mountains. It was said to be the scene of the surrender of four Irish clan chiefs (the O'Conor Don, de Burgo, O'Brien and O'Kennedy) to Richard II in 1395 when he made one of his two visits to Ireland.

In the late fifteenth century a bell tower was added which is 25 metres high and it is still in evidence today. The bells from this tower were sold in 1541 by Henry VIII and are said to be now in Christchurch Cathedral nearby. The bell frame which suspended the bells remained on the site until 1809. With the dissolution the contents of the property was sold and on 19 January 1541 "A rather large sum of money was realised from the sale of the chattels of the friary—£34.8s,7d compared to the Blackfriars’ sale, £24.13s.8d. By 1541 one bell remained unsold".

It was said to be "So near to the walls and Reginald's Tower was the friary that it was said that it was very necessary for the strength, defence and convenience of the city".

== Almshouse ==
The friary was suppressed by the dissolution of the monasteries of April 1541 by Henry VIII, but the friars were allowed to remain in the city. Henry VIII granted a charter in 1544 to convert part of the building into a hospital/almshouse.

== French connection ==
In the seventeenth century, the choir of the church was adapted by Bishop Nathaniel Foy for use by Huguenots who had been invited to Waterford to work in the linen industry. This led to the name "French Church".

== Graveyard ==
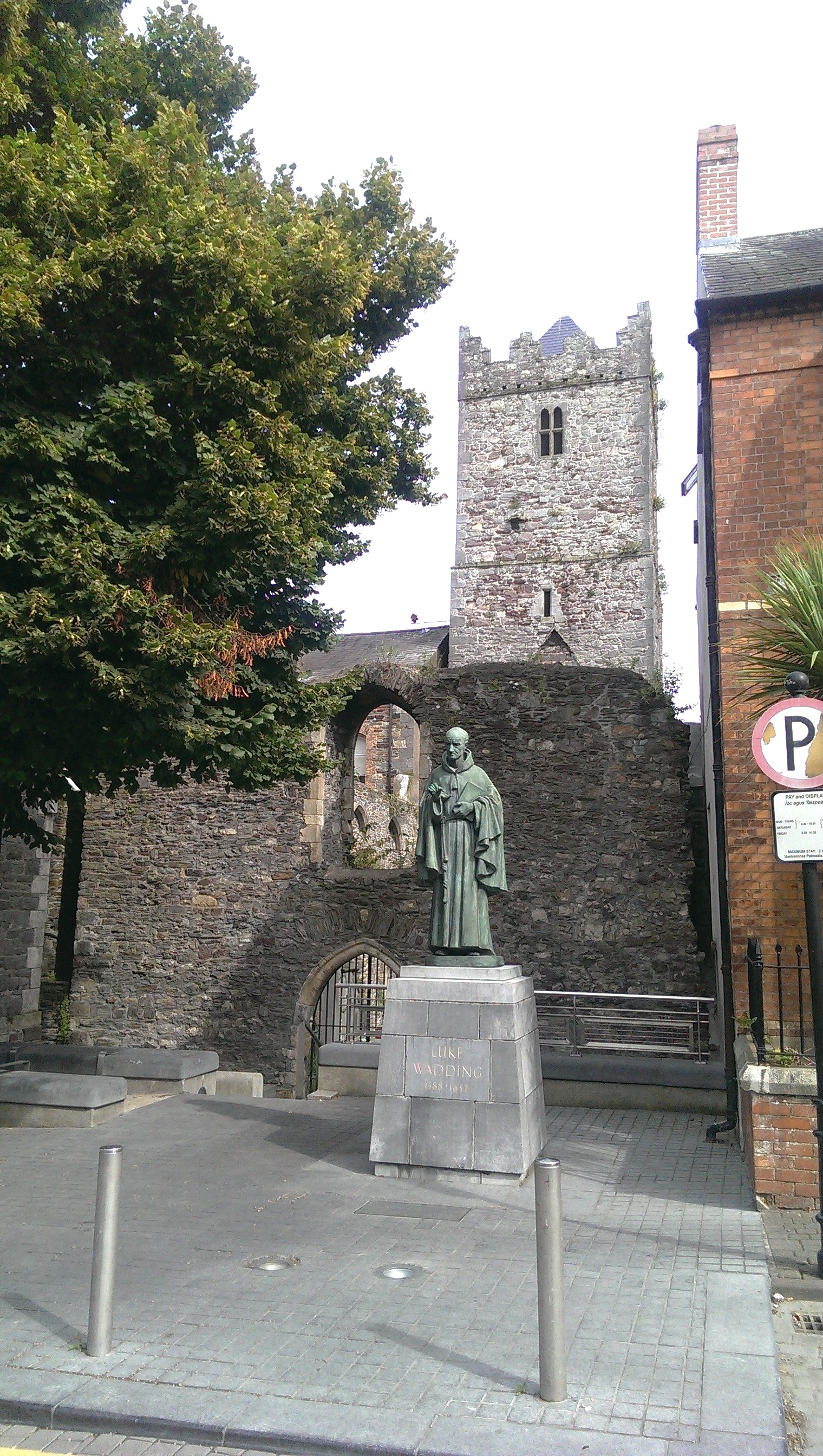
The entrance to the French Church, Waterford with the statue of Luke Wadding

Among the graves in the graveyard are those of: Sir Hugh Purcell (in about 1250), who was the founder of the church and lies beside of the high altar; Lord Richard Poer (8 August 1607), Baron of Curraghmore, an ardent supporter of the Catholic faith and that of his wife, Catherine de Barry, daughter of the Great Barry, Viscount of Buttivant; Sir Nicholas Walsh (12 April 1615), one of the chief judges of the kingdom in the Court of Common Pleas. Another notable buried on 3 April 1635 was Nicholas Power, Lord of Kilmeaden Also buried there is John Roberts (1712/14–1796), architect.

== See also ==
- List of National Monuments in County Waterford
- History of Waterford
