= Old Parish =

Village in County Waterford, Ireland

- Gaeltacht
- An Sean Phobal
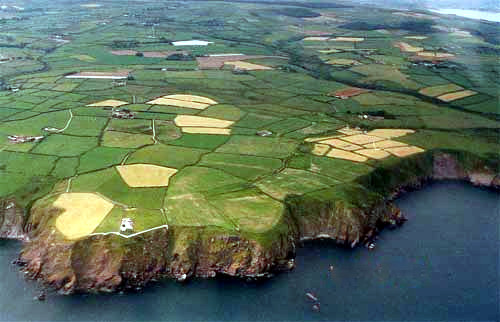

- Location in Ireland
- Coordinates: 52°01′N 7°37′W
- Country: Ireland
- Province: Munster
- County: Waterford

Population (2006)
  - Urban: 110
  - Rural: 600
- Time zone: UTC+0 (WET)
  - Summer (DST): UTC-1 (IST (WEST))
- Irish Grid Reference: X259930

Old Parish (Irish: An Seanphobal) is a village situated in the Waterford Gaeltacht in the southeast of Ireland.

== Geography ==
An Sean Phobal, as it is known locally, is a large parish covering about 35 square kilometres with approximately 8 km of coastline along Muggort's Bay. With a population of about 350 It is the second largest parish in Waterford by area stretching west to east bordering the villages of Ardmore and Grange to the other Waterford Gaeltacht parish of An Rinn and north to south from slightly beyond the Cork-Waterford N25 roadway to the coast. The closest centres of population to An Sean Phobal are Dungarvan (9 km to the north) and the County Cork town of Youghal (16 km to the south-west).

== Irish language ==
The Irish language plays an important role in the area. Gaoluinn na nDéise, the Waterford variant of the Munster Irish dialect, is spoken. According to the 2016 census 14% of the population spoke Irish on a daily basis outside the education system. The local primary school is Scoil Náisiúnta Baile Mhic Airt. Drama plays in Irish are produced annually by the local drama group, Aisteoirí An tSean Phobail, and the parish's GAA club competes in the Comórtas Peile na Gaeltachta, an annual Gaelic football competition contested by clubs from the Irish language-speaking Gaeltacht areas of Ireland. The official name of the area is An Sean Phobal or An tSean Phobail in the genetaive case. Both An Sean Phobal and Old Parish were on the local road-signs until 2005, when the anglicised form ceased to have any official standing. Today, roadsigns show the Irish name, An Sean Phobal only.

== History ==
=== Castle ruin ===
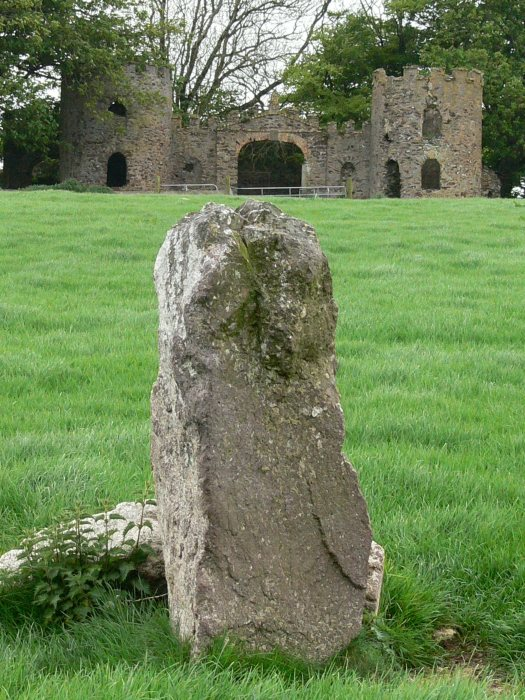
Castle ruin and mass stone

A castle ruin and a famine mass stone is situated in Baile Mhic Airt lower. There is very little known about the ruins; it is said that the initial owner was Lord Barron who came to the area and built it as a hunting lodge. This site is listed in the Buildings of Ireland Survey as an early 19th-century gate screen incorporating a central gateway with flanking lodges, probably built as part of plans to develop Glenanna Cottage grounds.

== Education ==
All education in An Sean Phobal is delivered through the medium of Irish. There is one pre-school - Lios na Síog and one Primary school - Scoil Náisiúnta Baile Mhic Airt. Scoil Náisiúnta Bhaile Mhic Airt is a co-educational Gaeltacht school, under the patronage of the Catholic bishop of Waterford and Lismore.

== Community Development ==
Community development in An Sean Phobal is primarily carried out by two bodies that co-operate with each other. Coiste Forbartha an tSean Phobail, which is a community based development committee, which runs the local community hall, Halla Cholmáin which hosts facilities and activities such as Sean Nós dancing classes, as well as organising and hosting a variety of community events such as the local branch of Comhaltas Ceoltóirí Éireann. Comhlucht Forbartha na nDéise, which represents the Waterford Gaeltacht also has an office in An Sean Phobal and works to develop various projects. Comhlucht Forbartha na nDéise was established in May 2005. It is a registered company and charity and has representatives from Coiste Forbartha an tSean Phobail, as well as Comhairle Pobail na Rinne, the other community based development committee in the Waterford Gaeltacht, on its board of directors. An Comhlucht Forbartha has developed and implemented several development plans for the Waterford Gaeltacht which have resulted in new facilities for An Rinn, such as An Imearlann, the local playground. Coiste Forbartha an tSean Phobal won recognition for their activities in the 'An Baile Beo' competition in 2006.

== Sport ==
The local GAA club, CLG An tSean Phobail, concentrates on Gaelic football. In 1949, the Shocks (as the team are known) won the Waterford Junior Football Championship. For hurling purposes, the area is associated with Rinn Ó gCuanach club. The club colours are red and white. In 2013, CLG an tSean Phobail helped to host Comórtas Peile na Gaeltachta by providing their playing pitch, Páirc Cholmáin.

The route of the Seán Kelly Heritage 100K runs through An Sean Phobal.

== Chicago connections ==
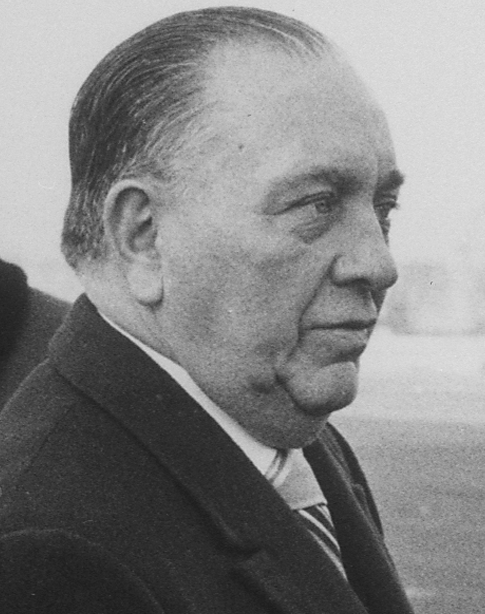
Richard J. Daley 1970

Two long-serving mayors of Chicago, Richard J. Daley and his son, Richard M. Daley have connections to the area. Richard J. Daley was the only child of Michael and Lillian (Dunne) Daley, whose families had both arrived from An Sean Phobal area during the Great Famine. A plaque dedicated to Richard J. Daley in Móin na Mín in An Sean Phobal. He donated a sum of money in aid of church refurbishment in An Sean Phobal around 1970.
