= Ballynagaul, County Waterford =

Ballynagaul Baile na nGall
- Gaeltacht district
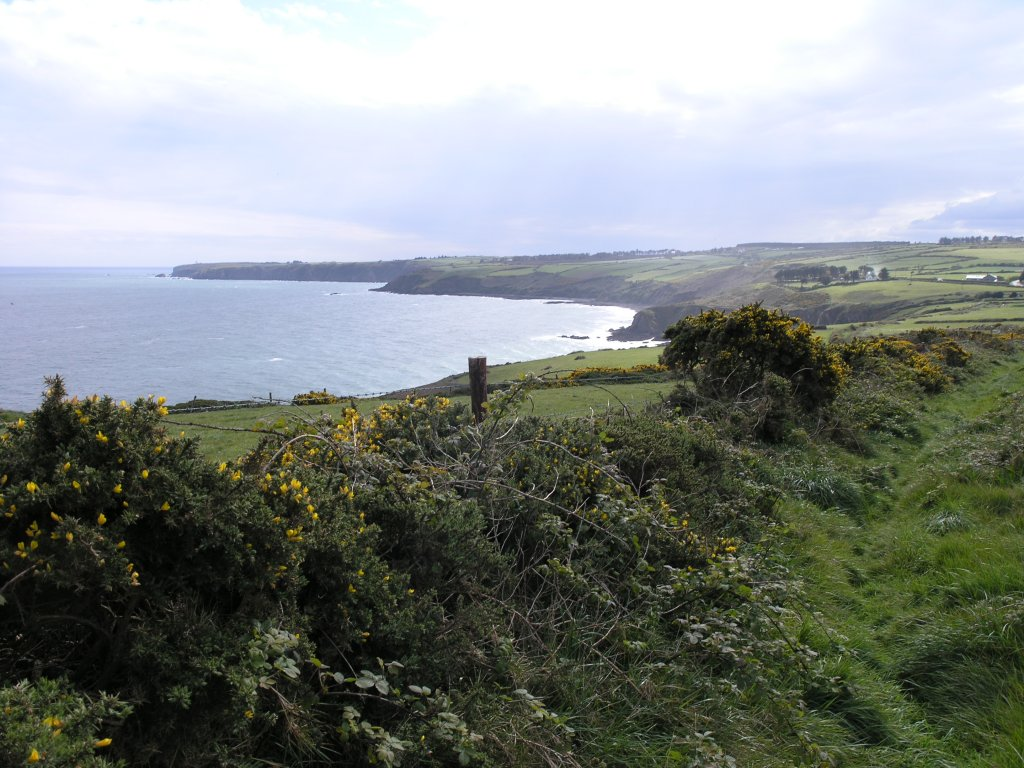
- Coastal path in Ballynagaul More (Baile na nGall Mór) townland

- Location in Ireland
- Coordinates: 52°02′53″N 7°34′01″W
- Country: Ireland
- Province: Munster
- County: Waterford
- Time zone: UTC+0 (WET)
  - Summer (DST): UTC-1 (IST (WEST))
- Irish Grid Reference: X297885

Ballynagaul (Irish: Baile na nGall, its official name) is a Gaeltacht area within the Irish-speaking Gaeltacht na nDéise part of County Waterford. Comprising the townlands of Baile na nGall Mór and Baile na nGall Beag (Ballynagaul More and Ballynagaul Beg), it is located approximately 9.6 kilometres southeast of Dungarvan. The village of Ring is located in the area.

Ballynagaul contains a pub (Tig an Ceoil), a shop, a playground known as 'An Imearlann', a small restaurant, a fishing pier (Cé Bhaile na nGall), and a beach. "Criostal na Rinne", a workshop where hand-cut glassware is made is also located in Baile na nGall.

== See also ==
- Munster Irish
- Rinn Ó gCuanach CLG
- List of towns and villages in Ireland
