= Déise =

Déise may refer to:

- An Déise, a colloquial name for County Waterford
- The Déisi or Déise, a social class in ancient and early medieval Ireland
- Gaeltacht na nDéise, the Gaeltacht area in County Waterford
