= Decies-within-Drum =

Barony in County Waterford, Ireland

Decies-within-Drum Na Déise laistigh den Drom (Irish)
- Barony
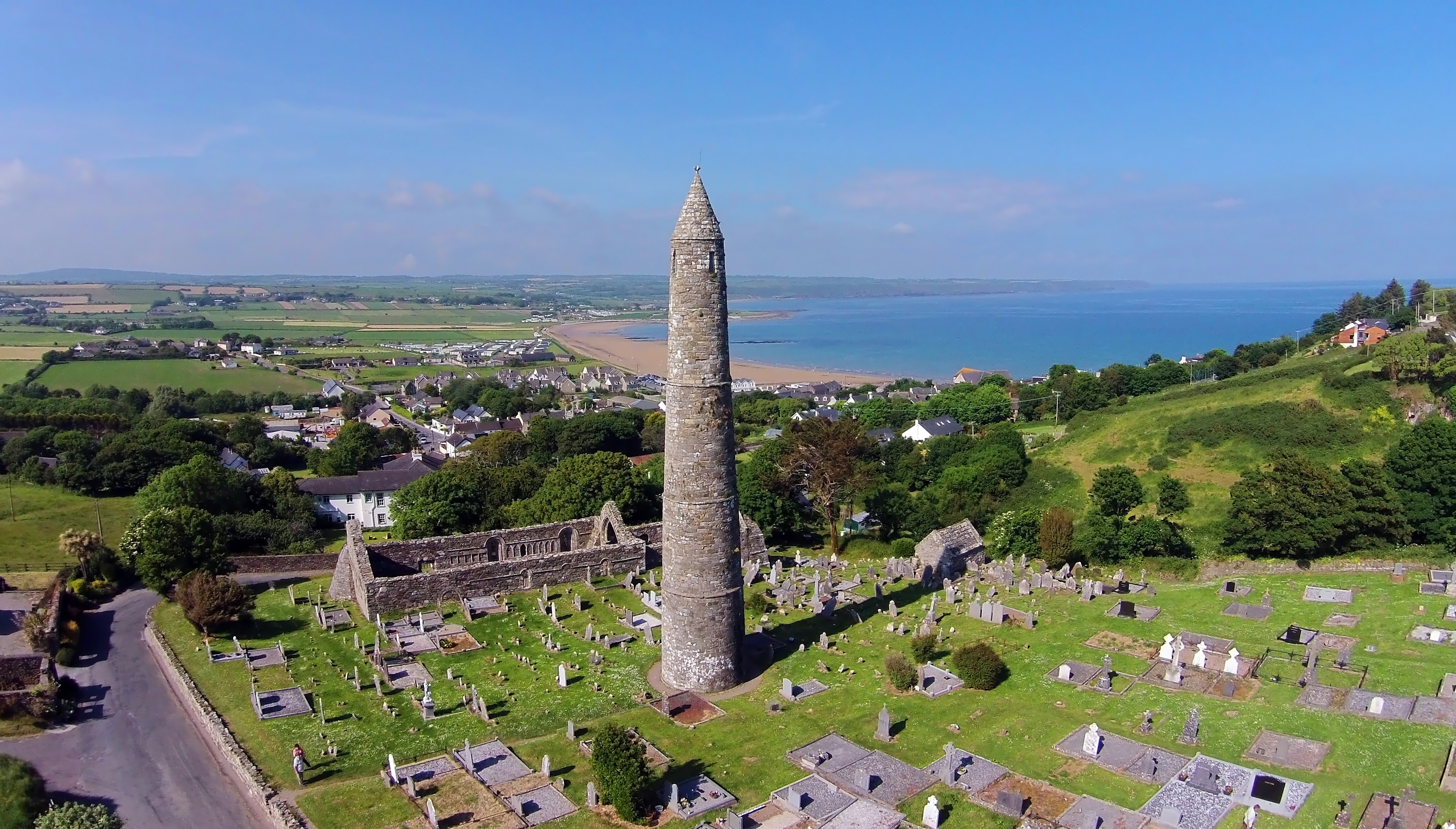
- Ardmore, on the coast of the barony

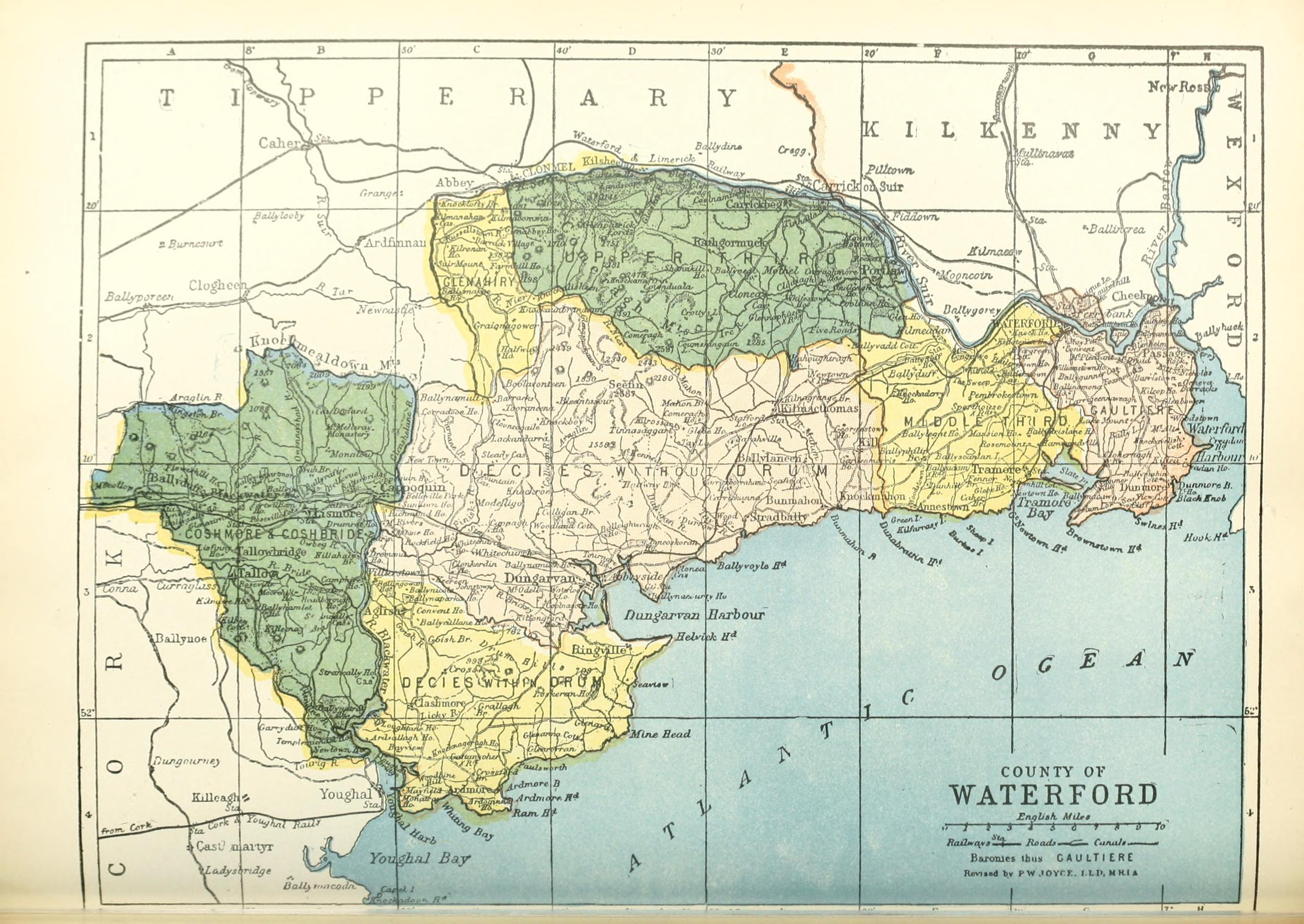
- Barony map of County Waterford, 1900; Decies-within-Drum is coloured yellow, in the southwest.
- Sovereign state: Ireland
- Province: Munster
- County: Waterford

Area
  - Total: 231.99 km^{2} (89.57 sq mi)

Decies-within-Drum (/ˈdiʃiz/; Irish: Na Déise laistigh den Drom) is a historical barony in County Waterford, Ireland.

== Geography ==
Decies-within-Drum is located in the southwest of County Waterford, east of the Munster Blackwater and including the coast between Youghal and Dungarvan harbours. It is separated from Decies-without-Drum by the Drum Hills.

== History ==
The Déisi Muman were an ancient Gaelic Irish tribe that occupied this territory; their name means "vassals of Mumu". They are believed by some historians to have Gaulish origin.

Decies-within-Drum was anciently the territory of the Ó Broic, a surname literally meaning "descendant of the badger", perhaps a totemic animal. They claimed descent from the Fir Bolg.

The Ó Broic were later driven out by the Eóganachta of Desmond. After the Munster Plantation it came to the La Poer (Power) family. The Walsh (or Welsh) family were also large landowners.

The original Decies barony was divided into two halves some time between 1654 and 1774. Decies-within-Drum contains Gaeltacht na nDéise, an Irish-speaking region.

== List of settlements ==
Below is a list of settlements in Decies-within-Drum barony:

- Aglish
- Ardmore
- Clashmore
- Ring
- Villierstown
