= Ballynageeragh Portal Tomb =

Dolmen in County Waterford, Ireland

- Cromleac Bhaile na gCiarraíoch
- Ballinageerah Dolmen; Ballynageere Dolmen
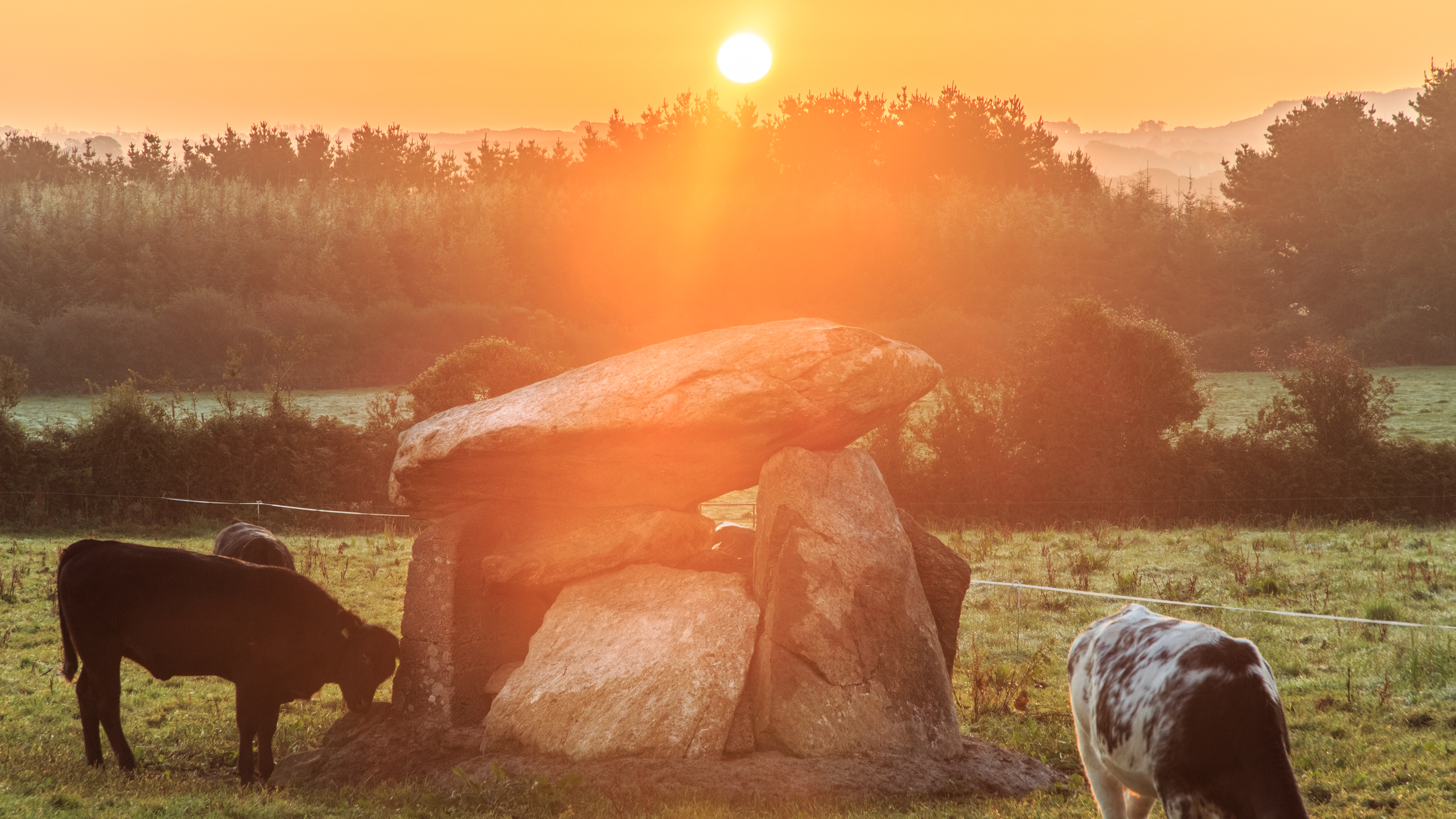
- The dolmen at sunrise, 2019

- Location in Ireland
- 52.177811°N 7.276862°W
- Type: Dolmen
- Periods: Neolithic
- Location: Ballynageeragh, Dunhill, County Waterford, Ireland

History
- Built: c. 3500 BC

Site notes
- Material: Stone
- Condition: Poorly reconstructed
- Owner: Veale family
- Public access: Yes

National monument of Ireland
- Official name: Ballynageeragh
- Reference no.: 384

Ballynageeragh Portal Tomb is a dolmen and national monument in County Waterford, Ireland.

== Location ==
The tomb is located in pastureland 1 km (0.6 mi) northwest of Dunhill, near the headwaters of the Annestown River.

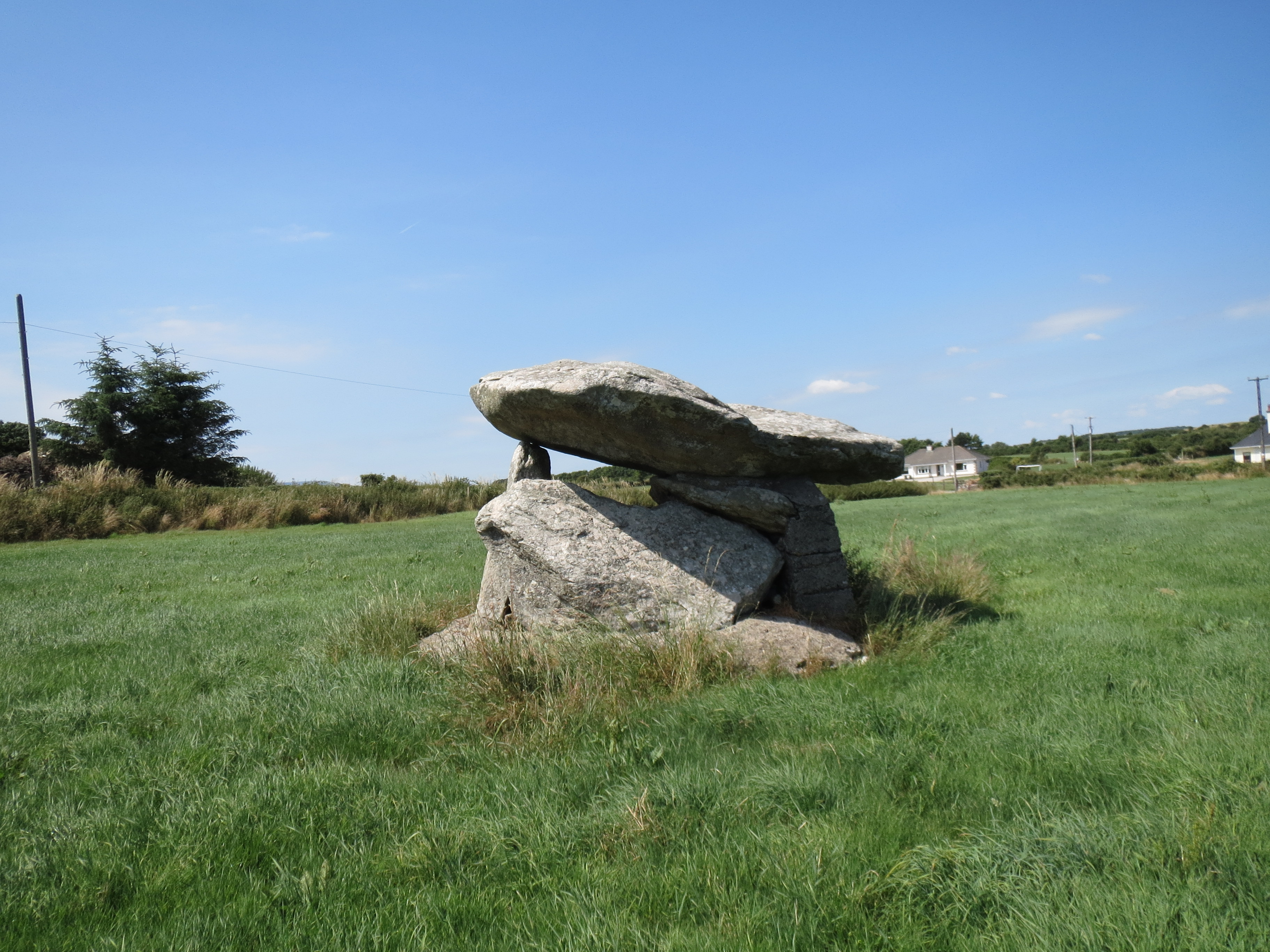
Ballynageeragh Portal Tomb

== History ==
Dolmens were constructed in Ireland in the 4th millennium BC. Investigations in the late 1930s revealed cremated bone, flint, and charcoal in the chamber. The tomb was (clumsily) reconstructed in 1940.

== Description ==
The dolmen has an oval capstone, 4 m × 2.65 m × 0.7 m (13.1 ft × 8.7 ft × 2.3 ft), weighing 6 3/4 long tons (6,900 kg). The tomb faces southwest (toward the setting sun) but the portal-stones are missing. The capstone rests on a doorstone and a cushion stone on top of the back stone. There are four uprights and two cap stones and several side stones.
