= CLG An tSean Phobail =

Gaelic games club in County Waterford, Ireland

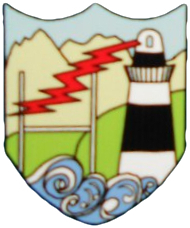
- County: Waterford
- Colours: Red and White
- Grounds: Páirc Cholmáin, An Sean Phobal

Playing kits
Standard colours

CLG An tSean Phobail is a Gaelic Athletic Association club based in the Irish speaking (Gaeltacht) area of An Sean Phobal, County Waterford, Ireland. CLG An tSean Phobail, concentrates on Gaelic football. The club they won the Waterford Junior Football Championship in 1949. For hurling purposes, the area is associated with Rinn Ó gCuanach club. The club colours are red and white.
