= Grange, County Waterford =

Village in County Waterford, Ireland

Grange An Ghráinsigh
- Village
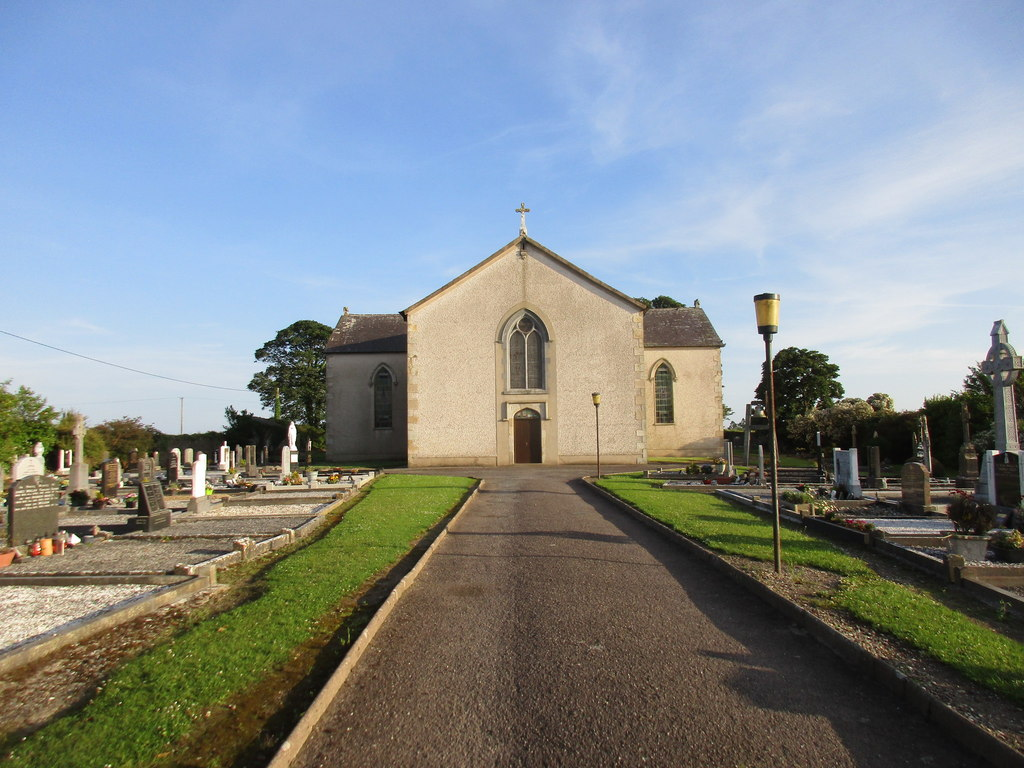
- St. Marys Church, Grange

- Location in Ireland
- Coordinates: 51°59′21″N 7°44′28″W
- Country: Ireland
- Province: Munster
- County: Waterford
- Time zone: UTC+0 (WET)
  - Summer (DST): UTC-1 (IST (WEST))

Grange (Irish: An Ghráinsigh) is a small village and townland in west County Waterford, Ireland. It borders Ardmore and An Seanphobal. Ardmore and Grange are two villages that make up the Ardmore-Grange parish.

== Amenities ==
The village lies on the N25 road, between the towns of Youghal to the west and Dungarvan to the north-east.

Amenities include the local Roman Catholic church (built in 1835), a national school (St. Mary's), two shops and a pub.

== Sport ==
Stage 2 of the 1998 Tour de France passed through Grange.

== See also ==
- List of towns and villages in Ireland
