= Áine Ní Fhoghludha =

Áine Ní Fhoghludha (10 November 1880 – 1932) was an Irish nationalist and writer in the Irish language.

== Life ==
Born in Ring in County Waterford to schoolteachers Micheál Ó Foghludha and Eibhlín de Brún. Her father was an advocate for the Irish language and she graduated in Irish. She taught in County Waterford but she lost her job after the Easter Rising. Some suppose that her nationalism was the reason for losing the job as she was an active nationalist and she supported the IRA. After this, Séamus Ó Néill proposed to her, and they were married on 21 June 1917. He subsequently spent some time in Durham and Brixton Gaols.

Her book Brosna (a collection of stories for children), published in 1922 (1925 by another source), was used in Irish schools.

She died in Caherciveen of pneumonia and was buried at Ring.

== Bibliography ==
(source:)

- Idir na fleadhanna (Between the feasts) (1922)
- Brosna (1925)
- Translations of four short plays by Father M.H. Gaffney:
  - Díthreabhach an tobair (The hermit of the well) (1934)
  - Breacadh an lae (The breaking day) (1934)
  - Bréag-riocht Apollo agus cúiteamh .i. Dhá dhráma i gcóir na ngasóg (Apollo's understudy and retribution, Two plays for the scouts) (1934)
  - Róis dhearga agus buadhann Críost (Red roses; Christ conquers) (1934)
