= In the Willows =

Irish musical group

In The Willows
- Origin: County Waterford, Ireland
- Genres: Alternative Folk
- Years active: 2011–present
- Members: David Greene; Tara Heffernan; Michael Grace; John Madigan; Rowan Sherlock; Paul O'Shea
- Website: inthewillowsofficial.com

In The Willows are a six-piece alternative folk band from County Waterford, Ireland composed of David Greene (vocals, guitar), Tara Heffernan (vocals, piano), Michael Grace (vocals, bass), Paul O'Shea (drums), John Madigan (piano, bouzouki), Rowan Sherlock (violin, viola)

== History (2011 – present) ==
In The Willows formed in 2011, releasing their début album Before Everybody Disappears in 2014 which charted in the Irish Albums Chart at number 95 in its first week of being released. Their final release would be the self released EP Fallen Bird, released in 2016.

== Discography ==
In The Willows discography
- Studio albums: 1
- EPs: 2
- Singles: 2
- Music videos: 2

=== Albums ===
Year	Album details	Peak chart positions
Year	Album details	IRL
2014	Before Everybody Disappears: Released: 12 September 2014; Label: Self Released; Formats: CD, Download	95
"—" denotes a title that did not chart.

=== EPs ===
Year	Album details
2014	Vantage Point: Released: 30 May 2014; Label: Self-released
2016	Fallen Bird: Released: 8 April 2016; Label: Self-released

=== Singles ===
Year	Title	Peak chart position	Album
Year	Title	IRL	Album
2013	"Rowing Boats"	—	Before Everybody Disappears
2014	"Sirens"	—	Before Everybody Disappears
"—" denotes a title that did not chart.
