= Glenahiry =

Barony in County Waterford, Ireland

Glenahiry Gleann na hUidhre (Irish)
- Barony
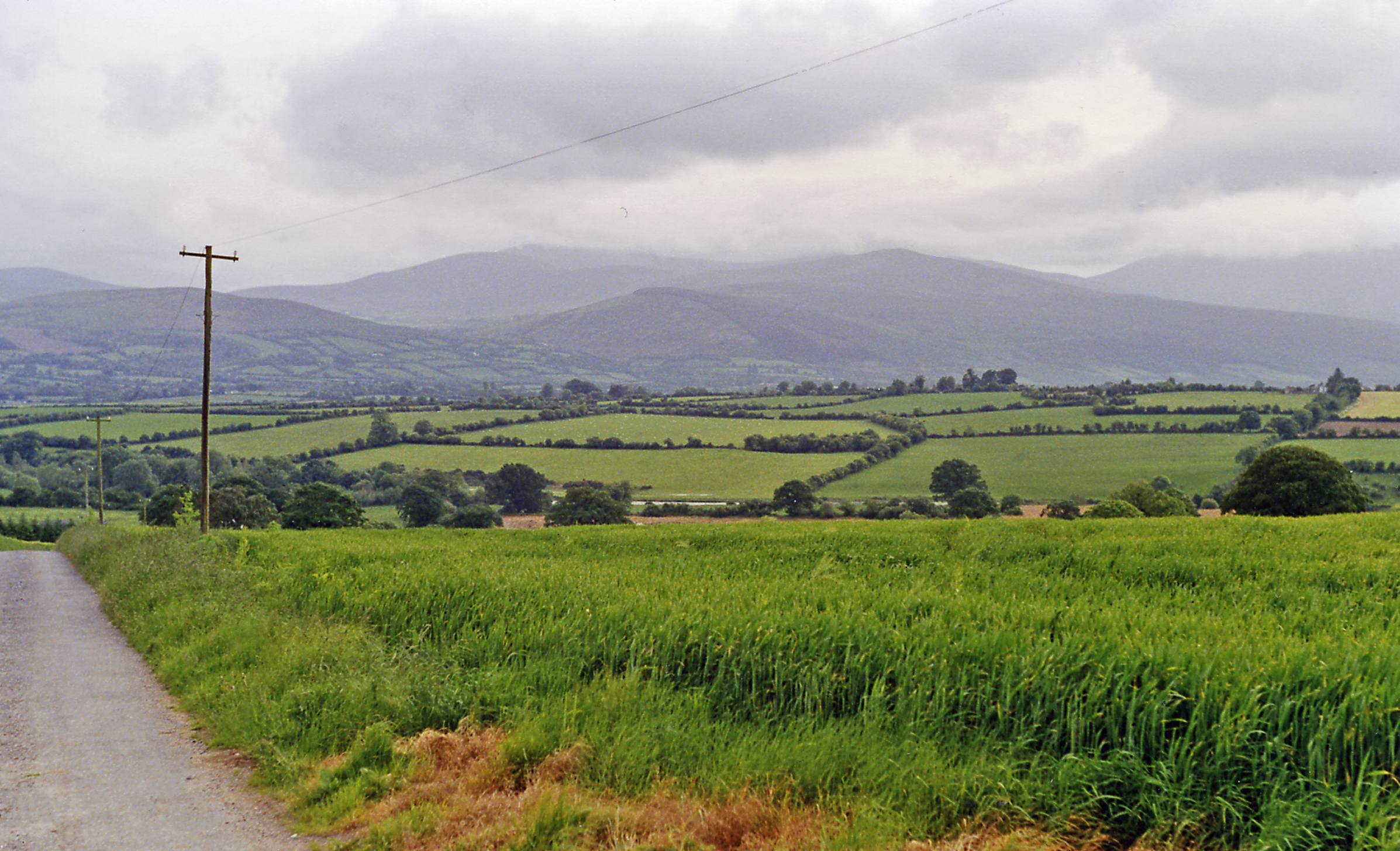
- Glenahiry countryside, Ballydonagh townland

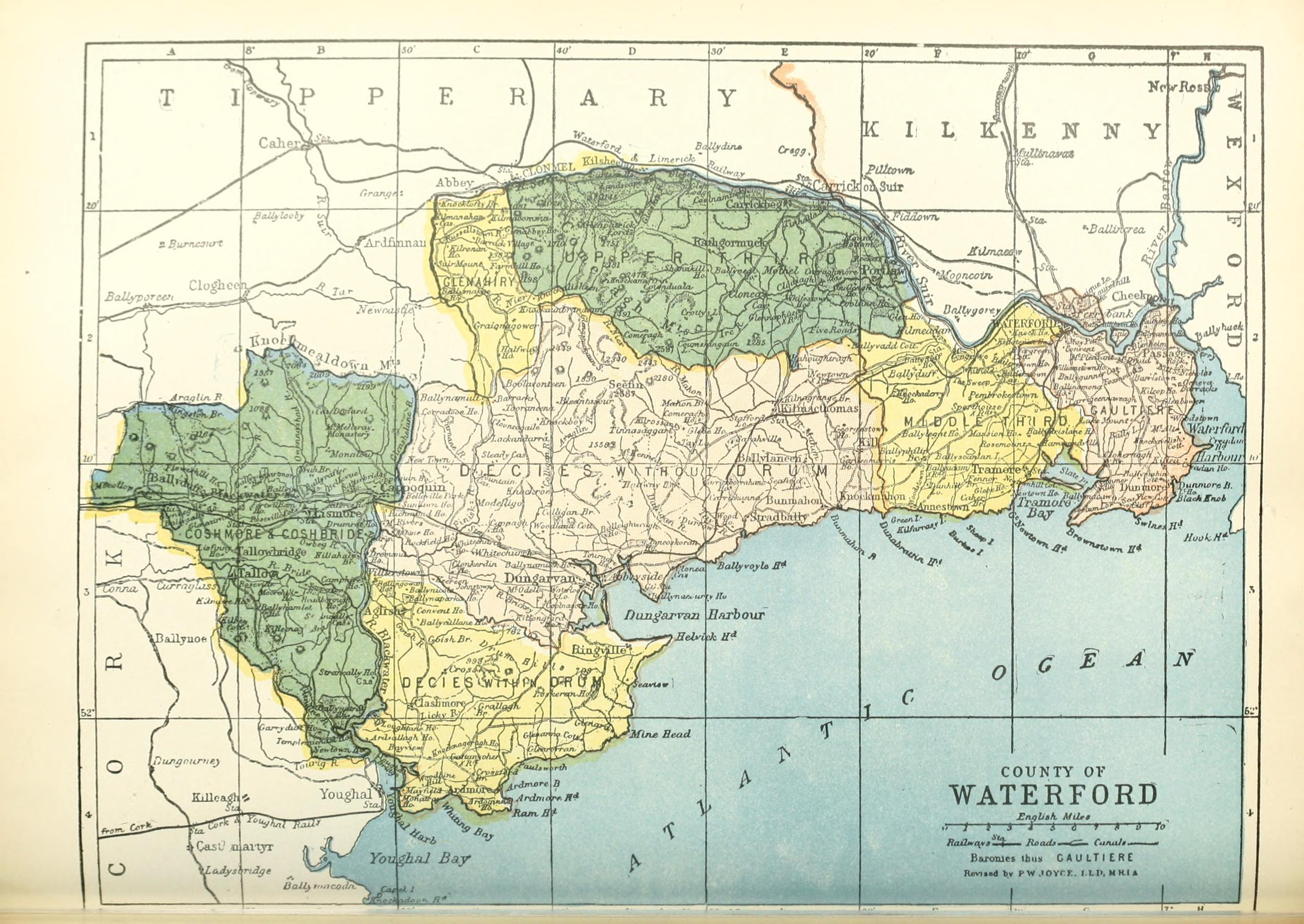
- Barony map of County Waterford, 1900; Glenahiry is coloured yellow, in the north.
- Sovereign state: Ireland
- Province: Munster
- County: Waterford

Area
  - Total: 157.58 km^{2} (60.84 sq mi)

Glenahiry (Irish: Gleann na hUidhre) is a barony in County Waterford, Ireland.

== Etymology ==
Glenahiry barony is derived from the Irish for "valley of the River Nier", which is called An Uidhir ("dun, brown") in Irish. The Nier joins the River Suir at Ballymakee.

== Geography ==
Glenahiry is located in northern County Waterford, east of the River Suir and west of the Comeragh Mountains. The Nier Valley Woodlands are a Special Area of Conservation.

== History ==
Glenahiry was the ancient territory of the Mac Cairbre (Carbery).

Glenahiry was established as a barony by 1672.

== List of settlements ==
Below is a list of settlements in Glenahiry barony:

- Ballymacarbry
