= Decies-without-Drum =

Barony in County Waterford, Ireland

Decies-without-Drum Na Déise lasmuigh den Drom (Irish)
- Barony
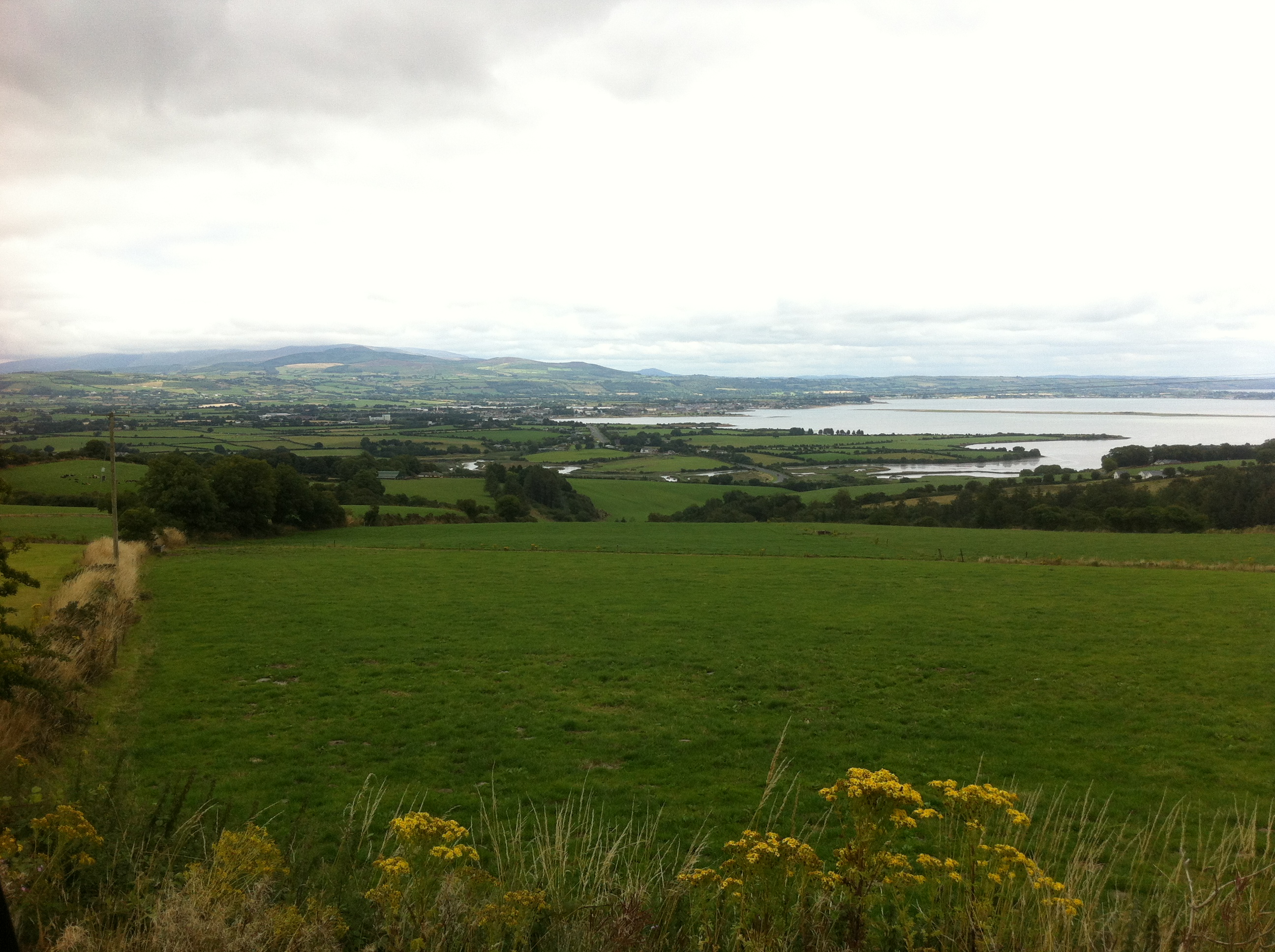
- View over Dungarvan Harbour, with the Comeragh Mountains in the distance

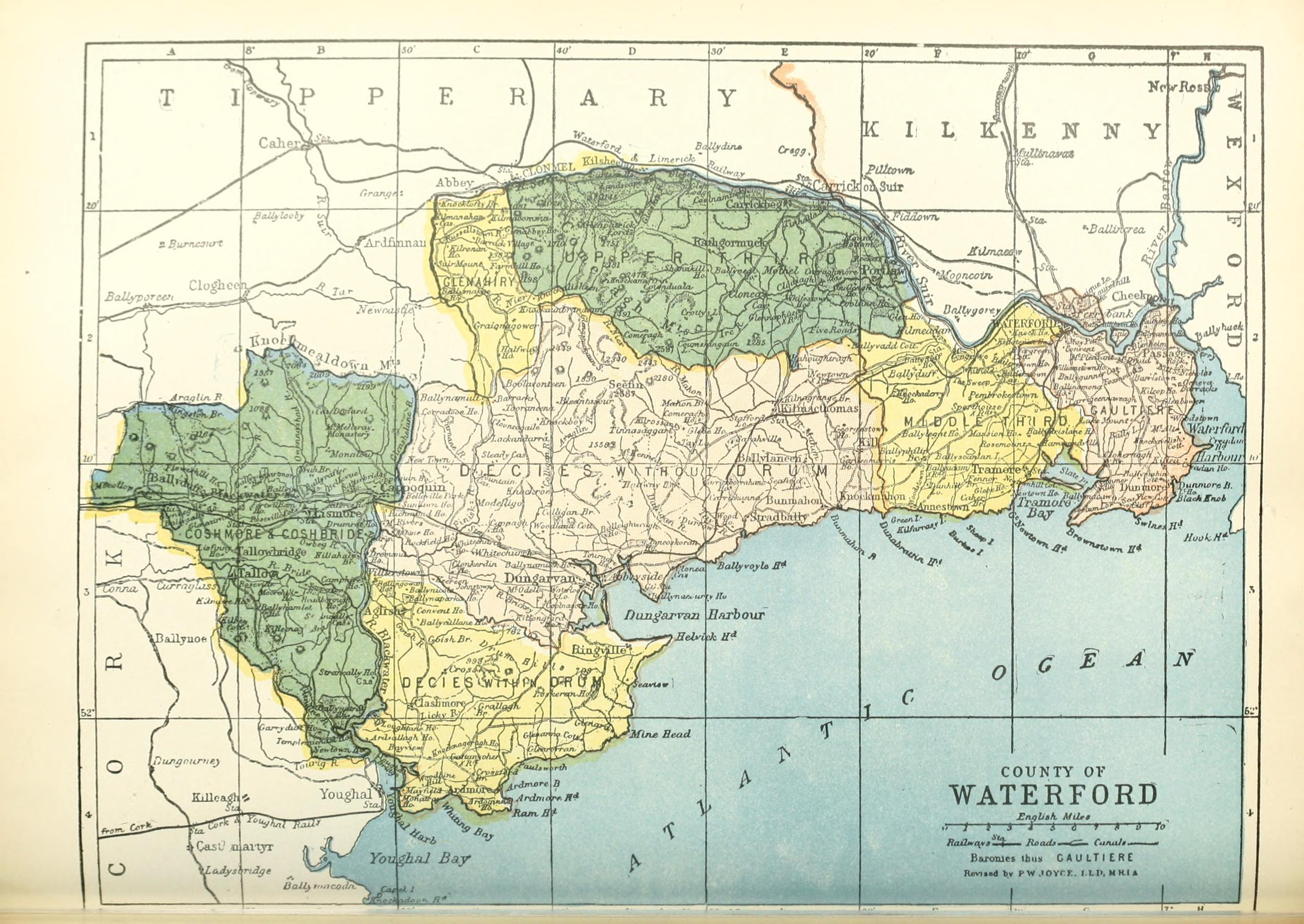
- Barony map of County Waterford, 1900; Decies-without-Drum is coloured pink, in the centre.
- Sovereign state: Ireland
- Province: Munster
- County: Waterford

Area
  - Total: 525.66 km^{2} (202.96 sq mi)

Decies-without-Drum (/ˈdiʃiz/; Irish: Na Déise lasmuigh den Drom) is a barony in County Waterford, Ireland.

== Geography ==
Decies-without-Drum is located in the centre of County Waterford, including the coast between Dungarvan and Dunbrattin Head; it is mostly upland. The Drum Hills separate it from Decies-within-Drum. It is bordered to the west by the Munster Blackwater, and contains most of the River Bricky and Colligan River.

== History ==
The Déisi Muman were an ancient Gaelic Irish tribe that occupied this territory; their name means "vassals of Mumu". They are believed by some historians to have Gaulish origin. Drumlohan Souterrain and Ogham Stones is an important historic site (AD 400–900).

The origin Decies barony was divided into two halves some time between 1654 and 1774.

Various branches of the Power / La Poer family owned land in the region before the Cromwellian settlement. Some of it also belonged to the Welsh/Walsh family.

== List of settlements ==
Towns and villages in Decies-without-Drum barony include:

- Abbeyside
- Ballinamult
- Bunmahon
- Dungarvan
- Kill
- Kilmacthomas
- Lemybrien
