= Dunhill, County Waterford =

Village in County Waterford, Ireland

Dunhill Dún Aill
- Village
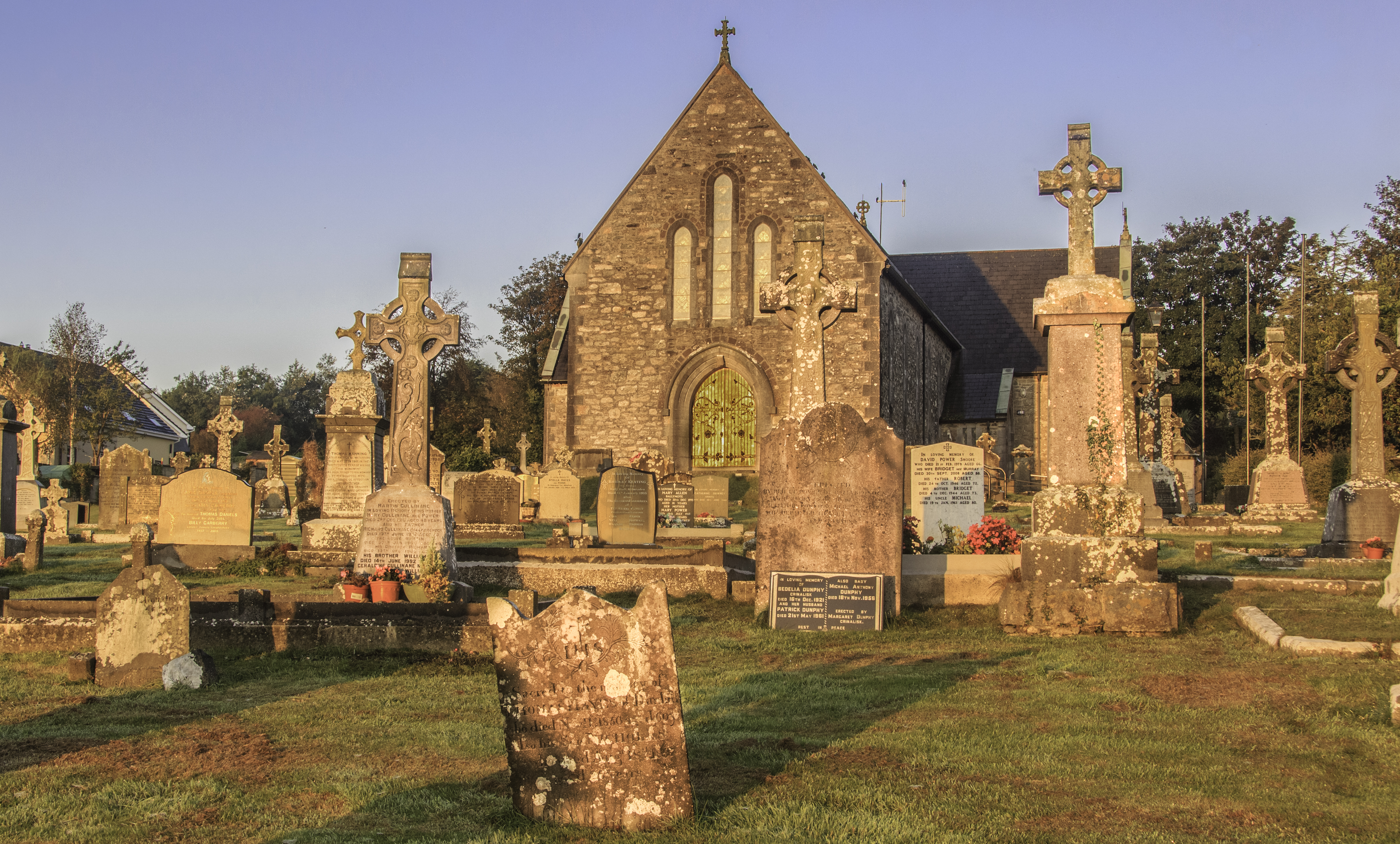
- Church of the Sacred Heart

- Location in Ireland
- Coordinates: 52°10′22″N 7°15′44″W
- Country: Ireland
- Province: Munster
- County: Waterford

Population (2016)
  - Total: 216
- Time zone: UTC+0 (WET)
  - Summer (DST): UTC-1 (IST (WEST))

Dunhill (Irish: Dún Aill, meaning 'cliff fort') is a village, townland and civil parish in County Waterford, Ireland. It comprises a church, a primary school, a parish hall, a public house and shop. An enterprise park called Dunhill Ecopark was established in 2000 by members of the Dunhill community.

== Religion ==
Sacred Heart is the third church to have been built on the current site. The first structure was erected in 1798 after an old building in the townland of Shanaclune was abandoned.

== Education ==
Established in the year 2000, Dunhill Ecopark is an adult educational enterprise park whose mission is to cultivate an entrepreneurial culture and facilitate job creation. Dunhill is also home to a national school.

== Sport ==
Dunhill Sports Centre and GAA pitch are located on Cois Cille road, opposite Dunhill Ecopark. The Dunhill GAA club enters teams in both GAA codes each year, which includes two adult hurling teams and one adult Gaelic football team.

== Archaeology ==
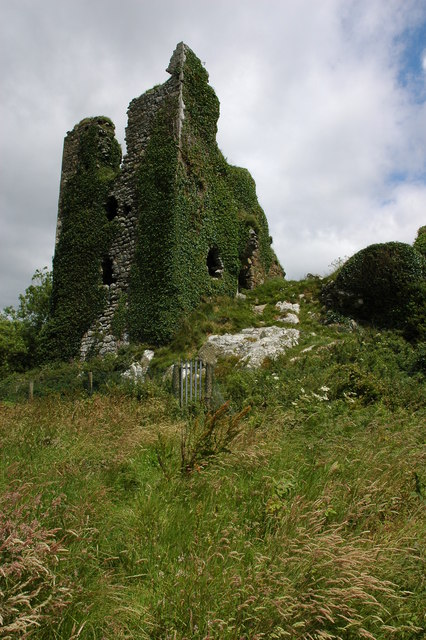
Dunhill Castle

The ruins of Dunhill Castle (tower house) is situated on a rock outcrop south of the village. The castle was owned by John Power in 1641 and traditionally it is thought to be an ancient stronghold which fell to Oliver Cromwell in the 17th century.

Additional archaeological sites in the area include an earthwork, font, megalithic tomb, and 2 ringforts.

== Walking trail ==
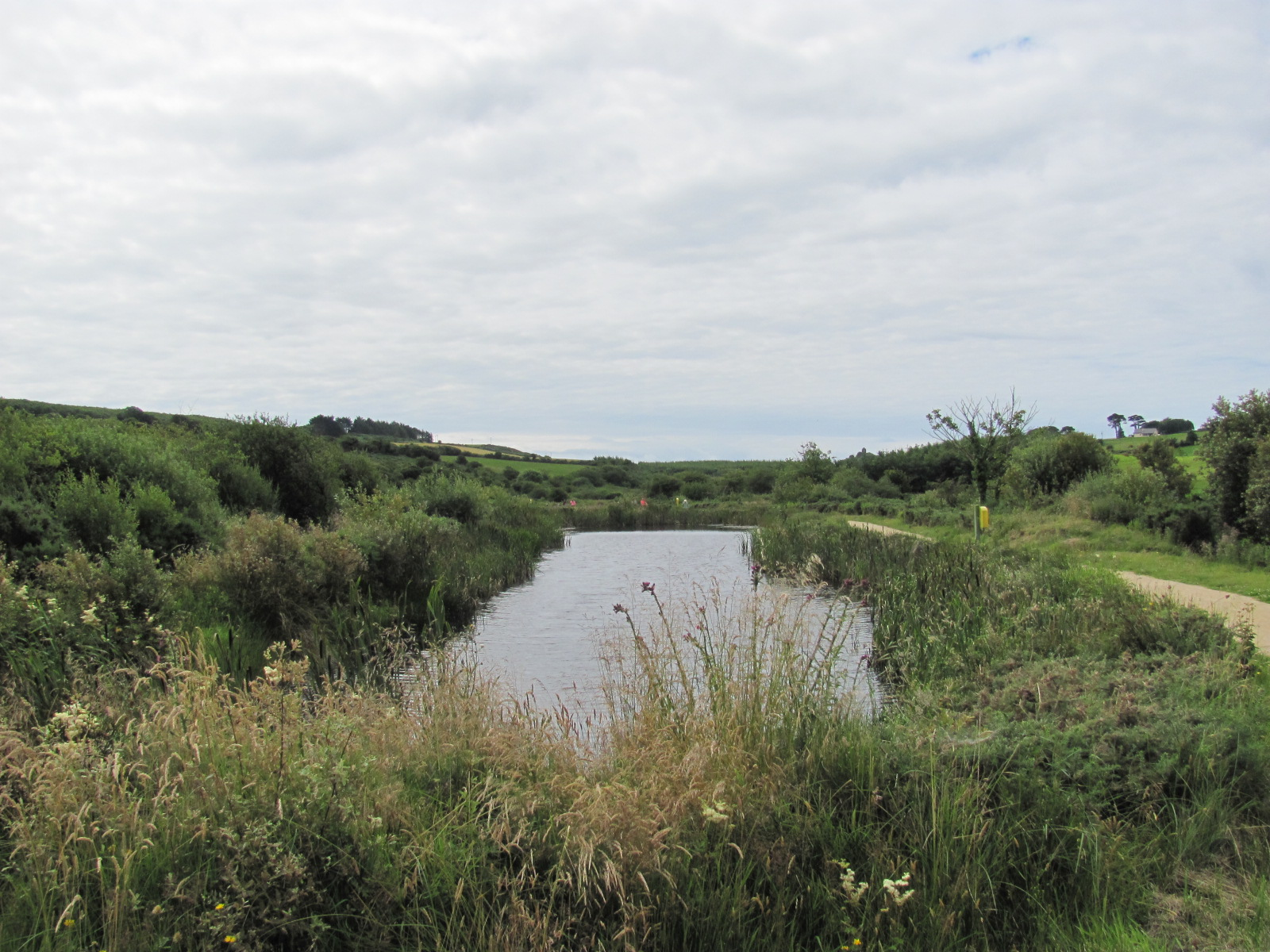
Part of the Anne Valley walk which shares a bridge and river with Dunhill

The Anne Valley Walk is a 5 kilometres (3.1 mi) greenway nature trail alongside the river Anne, leading approximately 2.2 km along a smooth gravel path from Dunhill Anne valley to Dunhill Castle, and then a further 2.6 km to Annestown Beach.

Wildlife such as mute swans, pheasants and ducks can be seen along the trail, as well as smaller local birds species. The surface of this local community initiative is buggy and wheelchair accessible (20 m total ascent).
