= Ballinroad =

Village in County Waterford, Ireland

Ballinroad Baile an Rodaigh
- Village
- Location in Ireland
- Coordinates: 52°06′18″N 7°34′21″W
- Country: Ireland
- Province: Munster
- County: County Waterford
- Elevation: 10 m (33 ft)

Population (2022)
  - Total: 1,389
- Time zone: UTC+0 (WET)
  - Summer (DST): UTC-1 (IST (WEST))
- Irish Grid Reference: X293948

Ballinroad (Irish: Baile an Rodaigh, meaning 'Town of the Rodaigh' also listed as Baile an Róid "Homestead of the Road) is a village approximately 3 km from Dungarvan, County Waterford on the south coast of Ireland. Ballinroad grew rapidly during the Celtic tiger era and is one of Dungarvan's main residential areas.

== Religion ==
Saint Lawrence's Catholic Church, c.1835, is located at the crossroads in Ballinroad.

== Sport ==
Dungarvan golf club is based in Knocknagranagh, Ballinroad .

Dungarvan Rugby Club, founded in 1968, the only active rugby club in West Waterford, is based in Ballyrandle, Ballinroad.

Ballinroad Football Club has been part of the community since 1971, with under-age and junior teams competing in the local Waterford league. The club gained promotion to the Premier League in Waterford for the first time in 2019.

Waterford Greenway, which is popular for walking and cycling, has a main access point car park and nearby café at Ballinroad.

== See also ==
- List of towns and villages in Ireland
