= Waterford Gaeltacht =

Gaeltacht in County Waterford, Ireland

Waterford Gaeltacht Gaeltacht na nDéise
- Gaeltacht district
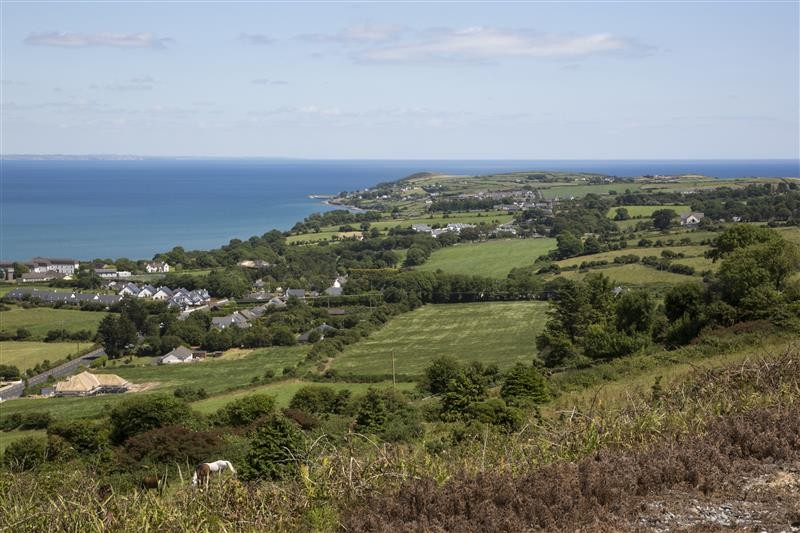

- Location in Ireland
- Coordinates: 52°03′00″N 7°35′00″W
- Country: Ireland
- Province: Munster
- County: Waterford

Area
  - Total: 62 km^{2} (24 sq mi)

Population (2022)
  - Total: 2,063
  - Density: 33/km^{2} (86/sq mi)
- Time zone: UTC+0 (WET)
  - Summer (DST): UTC-1 (IST (WEST))
- Irish Grid Reference: X259930
- Website: deise.ie

The Waterford Gaeltacht (Gaeltacht Phort Láirge), also known as Gaeltacht na nDéise, (Note: "Déise Gaeltacht", from the historical territory of Déise (anglicised as Decies), which covered present-day County Waterford and parts of South Tipperary; its name also survives today in the baronies of Decies-within-Drum and Decies-without-Drum.) is a Gaeltacht situated in County Waterford in the south-east of Ireland. It consists of the areas of Ring and Old Parish in the barony of Decies-within-Drum, 10 km from the town of Dungarvan. The area had a population of 2,063 people at the 2022 Census. It encompasses a geographical area of 62 km^{2}, representing 1% of the total Gaeltacht area.

== Language status ==
Figures for the use of Irish in the Waterford Gaeltacht are as follows:

Year	Total population	Daily Speaker (Total)	Daily speaker (outside education)	Daily speaker (only within the education system)
2011	1,784	-	438	-
2016	1,816	-	467	-
2022	2,063	850	508	342

The Waterford Gaeltacht saw the largest increase of Irish speakers since 2016 (15% or 187 people).

=== Comhlucht Forbartha na nDéise ===
Research into the status of the language in the area is carried out from time to time. The last such survey of the area was carried out in May 2006. Given the small population of the area, a full population survey was carried out. The research was carried out on behalf of the local development company, Comhlucht Forbartha na nDéise, by a team from Cork Institute of Technology. Over one quarter (29.7%) of households were found to use Irish as the principal home language, over two thirds (68.6%) were principally English speaking while a small minority (0.5%) another language was the principal language of the home. More than six-sevenths (86.3%) of respondents reported the ability to speak Irish, 13.7% reported that they are unable to speak Irish. Of those who speak Irish, well over three quarters speak Irish at home, with over half (53.5%) speaking Irish at home on a daily basis. Over one third of those claiming the ability to speak Irish reported speaking Irish at work and with friends on a daily basis. When asked if they wished to retain their status as a Gaeltacht area, the residence of Gaeltacht na nDéise gave a nearly unanimous response with 98% in favour.

=== Language planning ===
The Gaeltacht Act 2012 has set out a language planning process that will be undertaken in 26 Language Planning Areas throughout the Gaeltach, as set out by the Department of Rural and Community Development and the Gaeltacht. Gaeltacht na nDéise constitutes a single Language Planning Area under the act. A 'Ceanneagraíocht' or lead-organisation is selected by Údarás na Gaeltachta to develop a language plan aimed at increasing the use of Irish in their community. Comhlucht Forbartha na nDéise was selected by Údarás na Gaeltachta as the lead-organisation for Gaeltacht na nDéise. As such, Comhlucht Forbartha na nDéise had two years to develop a seven-year language plan for the area.

== Economy ==
=== Commerce and employment ===
Commercial fishing from the local fishing pier or Cé Heilbhic and Agriculture are sources of employment and economic activity in the area, though the importance of both has declined in recent years. Education is also a source of employment in both publicly and privately funded. Electronic manufacturing and the televisual sector which supplies TG4 and the international market are also contributors to the local economy. In 2011 there were 121 people employed in a full-time capacity in Údarás na Gaeltachta client companies in the Waterford Gaeltacht. By 2019, 149 people were employed full time in client companies of Údarás na Gaeltachta in the Waterford Gaeltacht. The area is somewhat disadvantaged, with a higher unemployment rate than the national average. There is a disparity between Ring and Old Parish in terms of economic development with Old Parish being at a lower level of economic development.

=== Tourism sites ===
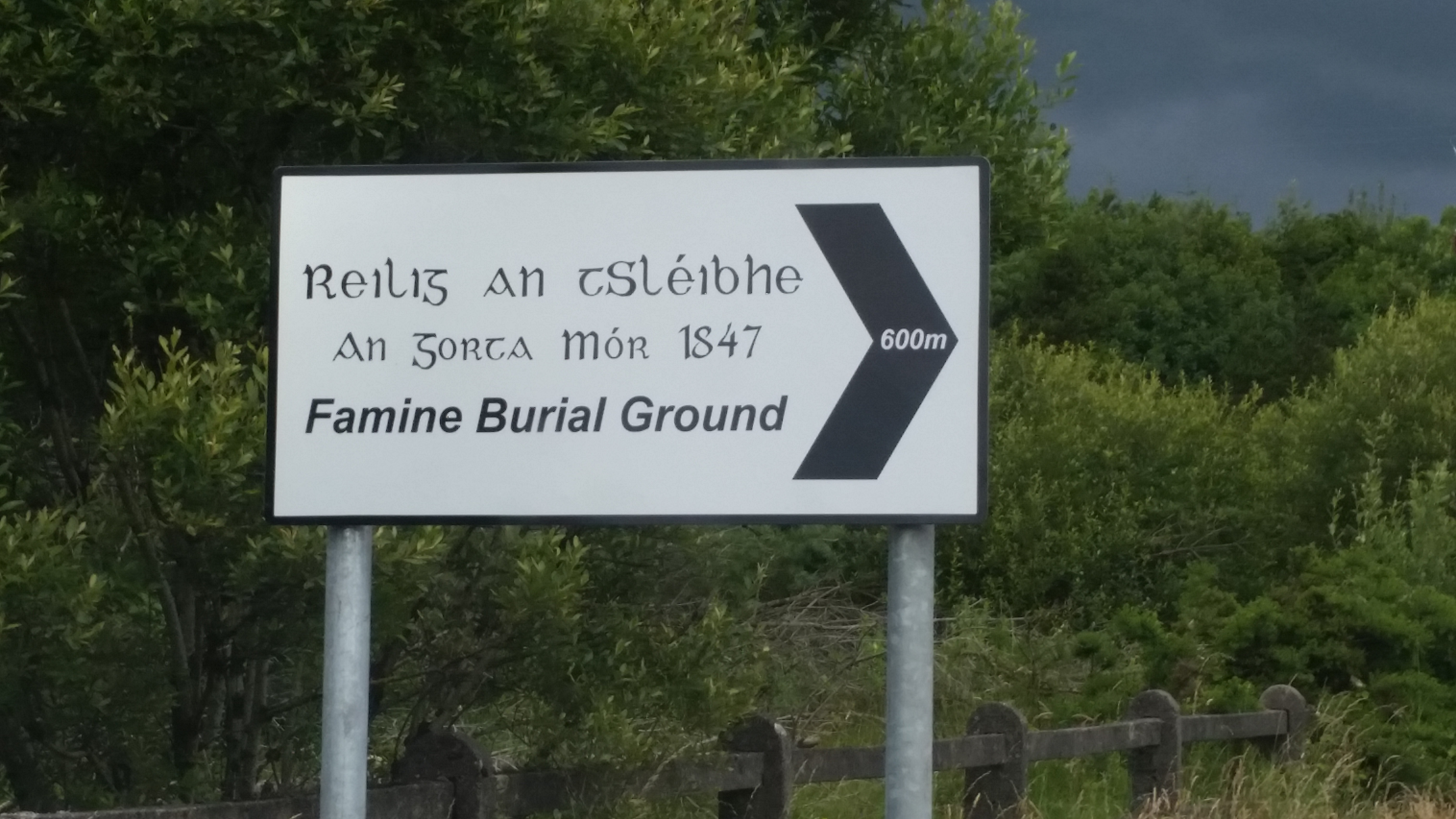
Signage directing people to Reilig an tSléibhe, the famine graveyard in the Waterford Gaeltacht

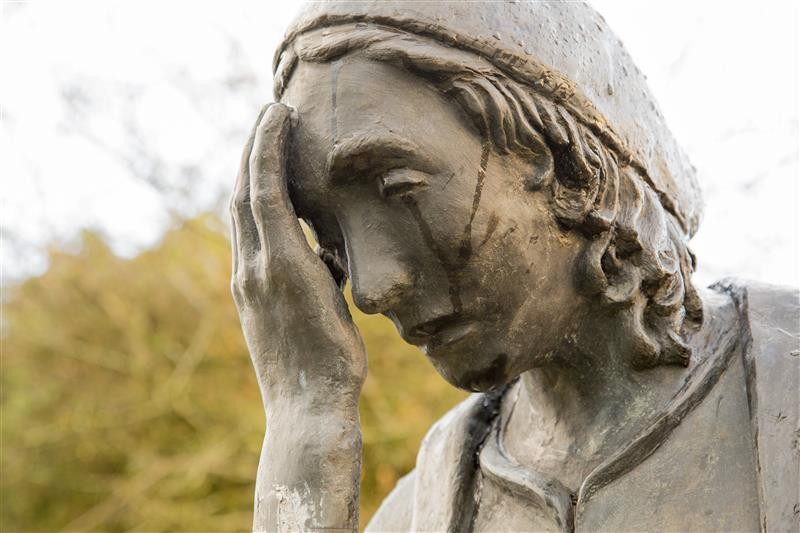
Statue at Reilig an tSléibhe

Tourism is an important part of the local economy in Gaeltacht na nDéise. Sites in the area include Reilig an tSléibhe, a famine graveyard located in An Seanphobal. Dating from the Great Famine, there are possibly 3 mass graves in the field that were used to cope with the large numbers and as the deaths declined, it is believed single graves were dug. In 1995, for the 150th commemoration of the famine, a memorial was created which was inscribed with part of Máire Ní Dhroma's poem, Na Prátaí Dubha. Also to be seen at the site is a solitary sculpted figure in mourning, at the side of the field. This sculpture was created by Seán Creagh; he died before it was complete and so the fibreglass structure that would have been used to create the mould for the final piece was erected instead. None of the graves at the site are marked in any way. Within the field there is, however, a headstone where G. R. Jacobs from the HMT Bradford is buried. He died at sea in 1916.

=== Tourism development ===
Comhlucht Forbartha na nDéise commissioned a report into Cultural Tourism in Gaeltacht na nDéise in 2014. This report was part of a wider tourism development project in the Gaeltacht that was largely funded by Waterford Leader Partnership. The study was undertaken by Dungarvan-based HandsOnEvents. The report found that significant cultural tourism development potential exists in the area due to the natural environment of the area, its cultural richness in terms of language, music and the arts, built heritage combined with the considerable enthusiasm by the local community.

As a result of this, a new tourism development committee, An Coiste Fáilte, which is a sub-committee of Comhlucht Forbartha na nDéise has recently been established in the area. The purpose of An Coiste Fáilte is to develop and enhance the area for both locals and tourists alike, and to focus primarily on the Irish Language, Culture and History of the area. This will ensure the sustainability of the area and preserve the history and traditions for future generations to come. Projects undertaken by this group include the development of Reilig an tSléibhe, the local Famine Graveyard, Aonach an Phátrúin, a Christmas Market organised on the Patron Saint's day in the area and the development of the areas presence as part of the new Ireland's Ancient East initiative.
