= Ring, County Waterford =

Ring Irish: An Rinn
- Gaeltacht
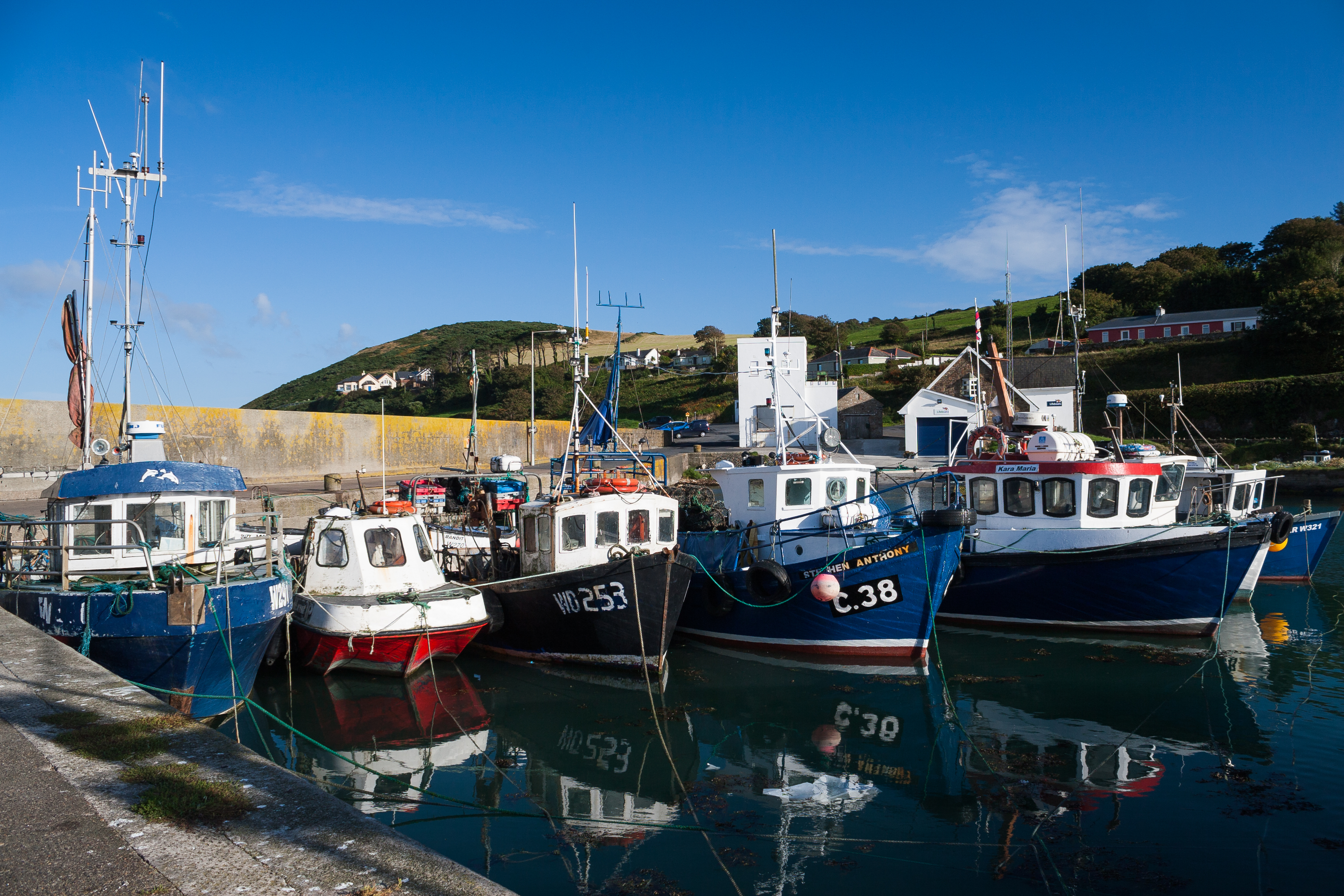
- Boats in Helvick Harbour on the Ring peninsula

- Location in Ireland
- Coordinates: 52°03′00″N 7°35′00″W
- Country: Ireland
- Province: Munster
- County: Waterford

Population (2016)
  - Total: 499
- Time zone: UTC+0 (WET)
  - Summer (DST): UTC-1 (IST (WEST))
- Irish Grid Reference: X259930

Ring (Irish: An Rinn, its official name) or Ringagonagh (Irish: Rinn Ó gCuanach [ˈɾˠiːṉʲ ˈoː ˈɡuənˠəx]) is a parish within the Irish-speaking Gaeltacht na nDéise area in County Waterford, Ireland. It lies on a peninsula about eleven kilometres (7 mi) south of Dungarvan. The main settlement is the village of Ring or Ringville, which is within the townland of Ballynagaul.

It is a growing area that has three schools – two primary (including Scoil na Leanaí in Coláiste na Rinne, a Primary-level boarding school) and one secondary school, Meánscoil San Nioclás. There are also restaurants, pubs, and other businesses. There are two fishing piers/harbours (Ballynagaul and Helvick), two beaches (The Cunnigar and Ballynagaul) and a cove at Helvick. It is the only Gaeltacht in Waterford, and the only one in the south-east of Ireland.

== Name ==
'Ring' is an anglicisation of the Irish name An Rinn, meaning cape, point or headland. In 2005, the Minister for Community, Rural and Gaeltacht Affairs Éamon Ó Cuív announced that by way of Placenames Orders under the Official Languages Act 2003, anglicised place names of Gaeltacht towns and villages would no longer feature on official signposts, and only the Irish language names would appear.

== Irish language ==
Gaoluinn na nDéise, the Waterford variant of the Munster Irish language dialect, is spoken by local native speakers. The strongest age group of Irish speakers is the 10-14 age category, of which 50.8% use the language on a daily basis outside of educational institutions. A large number of people have moved to the area over recent decades (primarily from other parts of Ireland), and as a result, there is a group of people living in Ring for whom Irish is not their first language.

The Comprehensive Linguistic Study of the use of Irish in the Gaeltacht, published in 2007 and updated in 2014, gave information in relation to the number of Irish speakers in Gaeltacht na nDéise and the three electoral divisions it comprises: Ring, Ballymacart and Ardmore. The results for Ring were as follows: 43.07% in 2007 and 48.14% in 2014.

According to the 2016 census 33% of the population in the An Rinn electoral division claimed they spoke Irish on a daily basis outside the education system, while over 75% said they could speak Irish

Áine Ní Fhoghludha, an Irish language writer, was born here.

== Education ==
All education in Ring is taught in Irish. There is a pre-school, Naíonra na Rinne, in the local community centre, Ionad Pobail na Rinne. There are two primary schools, Scoil Náisiúnta na Rinne, located at Maoil an Choirnigh and Scoil na Leanaí, a Primary-level boarding school located on the Coláíste na Rinne campus. There is one secondary school, Meánscoil San Nioclás, which services Ring, An Sean Phobal, and students from Dungarvan.

=== Coláiste na Rinne ===
Coláiste na Rinne (Ring College) is a Gaeltacht Irish College. It is home to Scoil na Leanaí, a Primary-level boarding school for 5th and 6th class pupils. It also operates as an Irish-language summer college. During term time it accommodates fifth and sixth class students. As it is a primary-level boarding school, many students go on to secondary-level boarding schools from here. Many of the visiting students during the summer are accommodated by local host families who speak Irish at home. The college also has third-level partnerships with UCC and SETU, and provides Irish language training courses for various public sector bodies and trainee teachers.

== Sport ==
Rinn Ó gCuanach CLG is a Gaelic Athletic Association (GAA) club based in Ring. The club enters teams for both Gaelic football and hurling each year.

== Community development ==
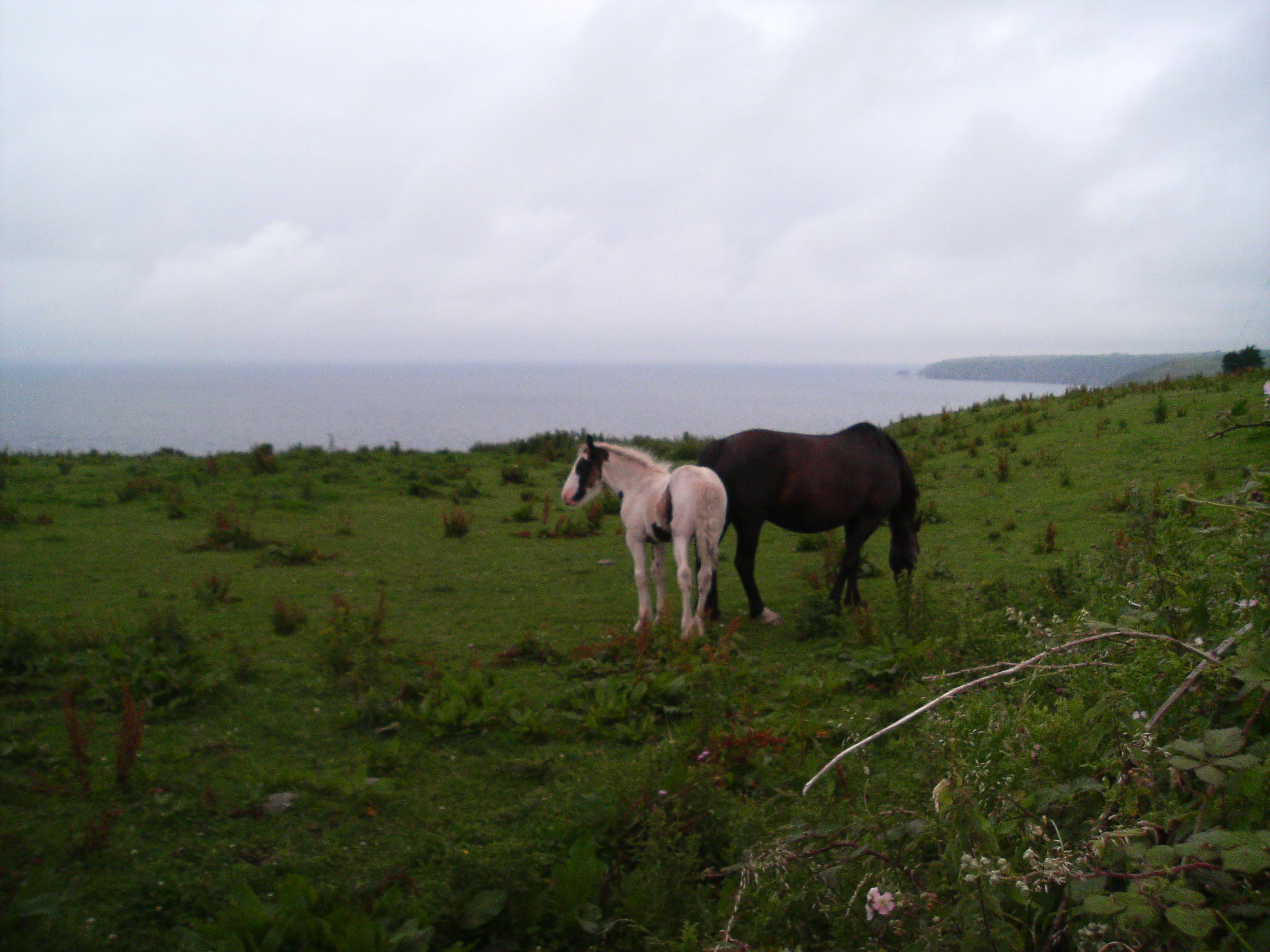
View south over the peninsula

Community development in Ring is primarily carried out by two bodies that co-operate with each other. Comhairle Pobail na Rinne runs the local community hall and Ionad Pobail na Rinne hosts facilities and activities such as Naíonra na Rinne, the local doctors' clinic, the Raidió na Gaeltachta radio studio, Seirbhís Iarscoile na Rinne, and Spraoi – a parent and toddler group – as well as organising a variety of community events. Comhairle Pobail na Rinne have a rial na Gaeilge which involves activities taking place in the hall to include the Irish language, and most activities are carried out in Irish only.

Comhlucht Forbartha na nDéise, which represents Gaeltacht na nDéise, also has an office in Ring and works to develop various projects. It was established in May 2005, and is a registered company and charity that has representatives from Comhairle Pobail na Rinne as well as Coiste Forbartha an tSean Phobail (the other community-based development committee in the Waterford Gaeltacht), on its board of directors. An Comhlucht Forbartha has developed and implemented several development plans for the Waterford Gaeltacht which have resulted in new facilities for Ring, such as a playground. Comhairle Pobail na Rinne won recognition for their activities in the An Baile Beo competition in 2006.

== See also ==
- Munster Irish
- List of towns and villages in Ireland
