= Déisi =

Socially powerful class of ancient Irish

The Déisi or Déise were a social class in Ireland between the ancient and early medieval period. The various peoples listed under the heading déis shared a similar status in Gaelic Ireland, and had little or no actual kinship, though they were often thought of as genetically related. During the era of Roman rule in Britain, many members of the Déisi were recorded as settling in western British coastal areas (especially the areas known later as Wales, Cornwall and Devon).

During the early Middle Ages, some Déisi groups and subgroups exerted great political influence in various parts of Ireland. For instance, in Munster, a subgroup of Déisi constituted a regional kingdom, Déisi Muman which ruled modern day County Waterford and South Tipperary, and were part of the hegemony of the Eoganachta confederacy.

== Etymology ==
Déisi is an Old Irish term that is derived from the word déis, which meant in its original sense a 'vassal' or 'subject' and, in particular, people who paid rent to a landowner. As such, it denoted a specific social class. Later, however, it was more often used as a collective term for the members of particular septs, regarded as originating in that social class.

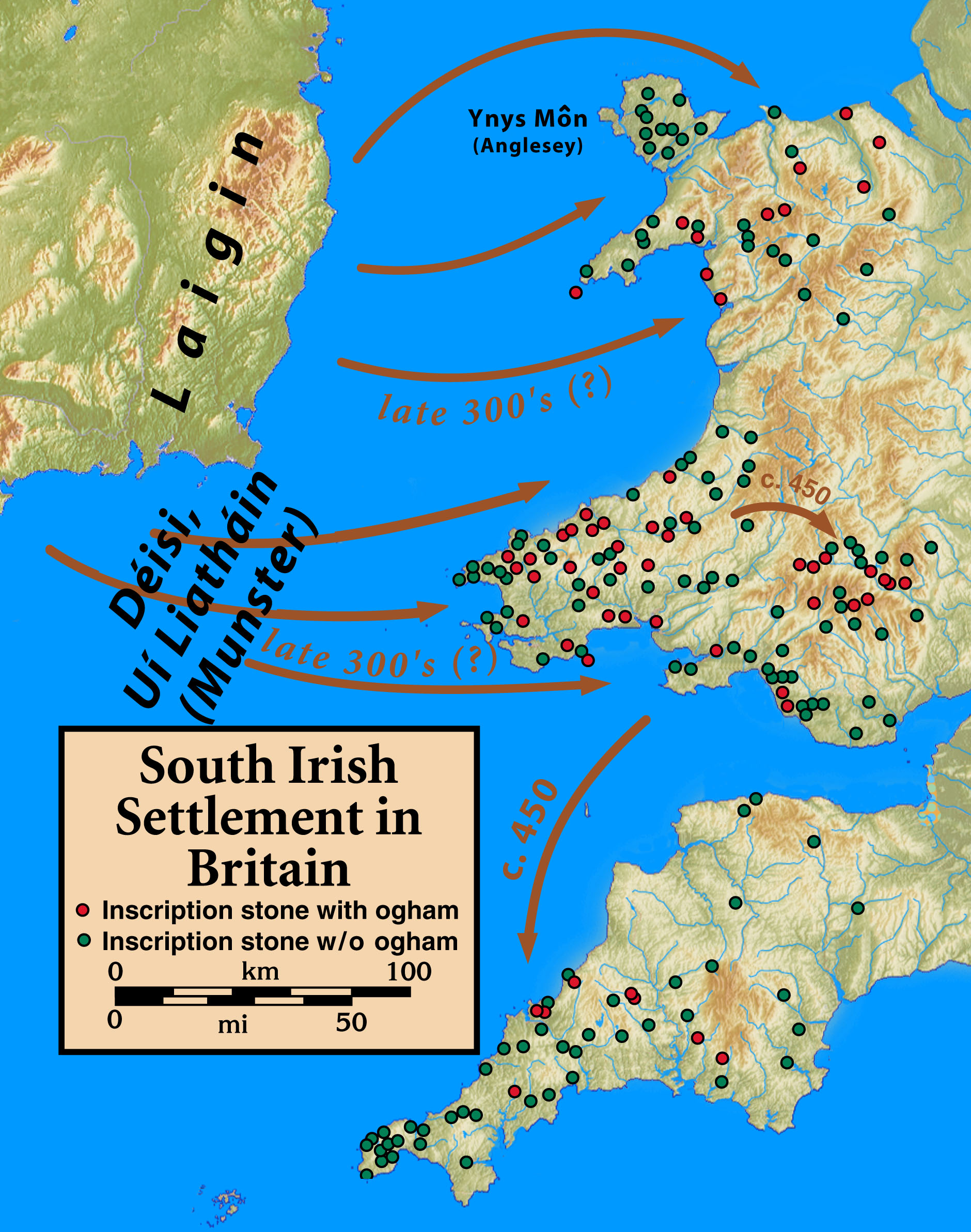
Roman era Irish settlements in Britain.

== History and contexts ==
The early histories of the Déisi groups are obscure. Evolving from peoples connected by social status rather than kinship, these groups had largely independent histories in different regions of Ireland. While some medieval texts attempt to give the Déisi an aristocratic origin, these are later fabrications dating to the period after the Déisi had gained political power. Despite their tributary origins, representatives of at least one Déisi population would eventually achieve spectacular success, founding a powerful medieval dynasty which is still in existence.

Déisi groups included the Déisi Muman (the Déisi of Munster), Déisi Temro (Déisi of Tara), Déisi Becc ("Little Déisi," located in the Kingdom of Mide) and the Déisi Tuisceart (the Northern Déisi; a sept of which would become famous as the Dál gCais).

Today, 'Déisé' is an informal term for County Waterford and its people.

=== Déisi Muman ===
The Déisi Muman were a prominent enough power to form their own regional kingdom in Munster from a fairly early date. Writing in Medieval Ireland: Territorial, Political and Economic Divisions in 2008, Paul MacCotter states "The regional kingdom of Déisi Muman must have existed in roughly its present location from a very early period. Oghams dating perhaps from the fifth century record unique first names associated with its kings". According to Francis John Byrne, there are certain inscriptional hints that both the Eóganachta and their Waterford Déisi vassals may have been of fairly recent Gaulish origins. The ancestors of the Eóganachta are known as the Deirgtine and they are also believed to have been active in Roman Britain, one piece of evidence being the name of their capital Cashel, thought to be inspired by the Roman castella they observed on raids. The Déisi Muman enjoyed a position in the later Eóganachta overkingdom suggesting a special relationship. Byrne mentions it was noticed by Eoin MacNeill that a number of the early names in the Eóganachta pedigrees are found in oghams in the Déisi country of Waterford, among them Nia Segamain (NETASEGAMONAS), after the Gaulish war god Segomo. According to MacNeill, the Waterford Déisi and the Eóganachta at Cashel "cannot well be disconnected".

The Uí Liatháin dynasty were western neighbours of the proto-Déisi Muman along the southern Irish coast and raided and colonized parts of Wales and Cornwall. They are the best characterized of the South Irish colonists because of clear references to them by name in both early Irish and early British sources, while the presence of the Déisi Muman cannot actually be confirmed. Also noted are the Laigin, particularly in North Wales.

==== Possible presence in Britain ====
The Déisi Muman are the subjects of one of the most famous medieval Irish epic tales, The Expulsion of the Déisi. This literary work, first written sometime in the eighth century, is a pseudo-historical foundation legend for the medieval Kingdom of Déisi Muman, which seeks to hide the historical reality that the kingdom's origins lay among the indigenous tributary peoples of Munster. To this end it attributes to "the Déisi" an entirely fictive royal ancestry at Tara. The term "Déisi" is used anachronistically in The Expulsion of the Déisi, since its chronologically confused narrative concerns "events" that long predate the historical development of déisi communities into distinct tribal polities or the creation of the kingdom of Déisi Muman. The epic tells the story of a sept called the Dal Fiachach Suighe, who are expelled from Tara by their kinsman, Cormac mac Airt, and forced to wander homeless. After a southward migration and many battles, part of the sept eventually settled in Munster.

At some point during this migration from Tara to Munster, one branch of the sept, led by Eochaid Allmuir mac Art Corb, sails across the sea to Britain where, it is said, his descendants later ruled in Demed, the former territory of the Demetae (modern Dyfed). The Expulsion of the Déisi is the only direct source for this "event". The historicity of this particular passage of the epic apparently receives partial "confirmation" from a pedigree preserved in the late tenth-century Harleian genealogies, in which the contemporary kings of Dyfed claim descent from Triphun (fl. 450), a great-grandson of Eochaid Allmuir, although the Harleian genealogy itself presents an entirely different version of Triphun's own ancestry in which he descends from a Roman imperial line traced back to St. Helena, whose alleged British origin the genealogist stresses. This manifest fiction apparently reflects a later attempt to fabricate a more illustrious and/or indigenous lineage for the Dyfed dynasty, especially as other Welsh genealogical material partially confirms the Irish descent of Triphun. If the relocation of some of the "Déisi" to Dyfed is indeed historical, it is unclear whether it entailed a large-scale tribal migration or merely a dynastic transfer, or both as part of a multi-phase population movement. However this movement is characterised, scholarship has demonstrated that it cannot have taken place as early as the date implied in The Expulsion of the Déisi (i.e. shortly after the blinding of Cormac mac Airt, traditionally dated AD 265), but must have begun during the second half of the fourth century at the earliest, while commencement in the sub-Roman period in the early fifth century cannot be excluded. It is further entirely possible that the historians and genealogists of the Déisi Muman were guilty of lifting these "verified" ancestors, who could have originally belonged to another Irish kindred entirely. Genealogical feats of this kind were famously performed by the Déisi Tuisceart or "Dál gCais".

The term déisi is also virtually interchangeable with another Old Irish term, aithechthúatha (meaning "rent-paying tribes", "vassal communities" or "tributary peoples"). From the 18th century, it had been suggested that this term might be the origin of the Attacotti who are reported attacking Roman Britain in the 360s, although the argument has been doubted on etymological grounds. This argument has recently been reopened, however, by a proposed equation of déisi – aithechthúatha – Attacotti in a late fourth-century context.

Finally, MacNeill discusses the movements of the Uí Liatháin mentioned above at considerable length, arguing their leadership in the South Irish conquests and founding of the later dynasty of Brycheiniog, figures in the Welsh genealogies matching Uí Liatháin dynasts in the Irish genealogies. He argues any possible settlement of the Déisi would have been subordinate until the ousting of the Uí Liatháin by the sons of Cunedda.

=== Déisi Tuisceart ===
Byrne later discusses how the rise of the Dál gCais sept of Déisi Tuisceart in North Munster at the expense of the Eóganachta was not unlike the rise of that dynasty at the expense of the Dáirine several centuries before, and this may in fact have been the inspiration for Dál gCais claims. An earlier and frequently cited argument by John V. Kelleher is that this was a political scheme of the Uí Néill, Ireland's most dominant dynasty, whom he argues created the Kingdom of Thomond in the tenth century to further weaken the position of the already divided Eóganachta. If true, the Uí Néill were creating who would soon become their greatest military rivals in nearly the last four centuries, threatening Tara as much as Cashel. The Déisi Muman, on the other hand, remained prominent supporters of the Eóganachta throughout their career.

The movement of the Déisi Tuisceart into the modern County Clare is not documented, but it is commonly associated with the "annex" of the region to Munster after the decline of Uí Fiachrach Aidhne power in south Connacht. Byrne suggests this dates from the victory of the king of Cashel, Faílbe Flann mac Áedo Duib, over the celebrated king of Connacht Guaire Aidne mac Colmáin at the Battle of Carn Feradaig in 627.

A famous early 12th-century propaganda text detailing the rise of the Dál gCais is the Cogad Gáedel re Gallaib.

Recent studies suggest the Dál gCais have a genetic signature unique to themselves, referred to as Irish Type III. Belonging to Haplogroup R1b (Y-DNA), this subclade R1b1b2a1a1b4h is defined by the presence of the marker R-L226/S168.

== Annalistic references ==
- AI966.1 Bissextile. Kl. Death of Cellach son of Faelán, king of Laigin, and of Faelán son of Cormac, king of the Déisi.
- AI982.3 Cathal son of Gébennach, a royal heir of In Déis Bec, and Uainide son of Donnubán, king of Uí Chairpri, and Donnchadh son of Mael Sechnaill, king of Gabair, and many others died this year.
- AI985.2 The Déisi raided Brian's mercenaries and took three hundred cows. And Brian harried the Déisi to avenge that, and chased Domnall, son of Faelán, as far as Port Láirge, and the whole of the Déisi was devastated.
- AI1009.2 Death of Aed, king of the Déisi.
- AI1031.5 A battle between the Déisi, and great slaughter was inflicted on both sides.

== See also ==
- Bruff
- Declán of Ardmore
- Waterford Gaeltacht
- Vita tripartita Sancti Patricii
- Pre-Norman invasion Irish Celtic kinship groups, from whom many of the modern Irish surnames came from
