= County Waterford =

County in Ireland

Coordinates: 52°15′N 7°30′W

County Waterford Contae Phort Láirge
- County
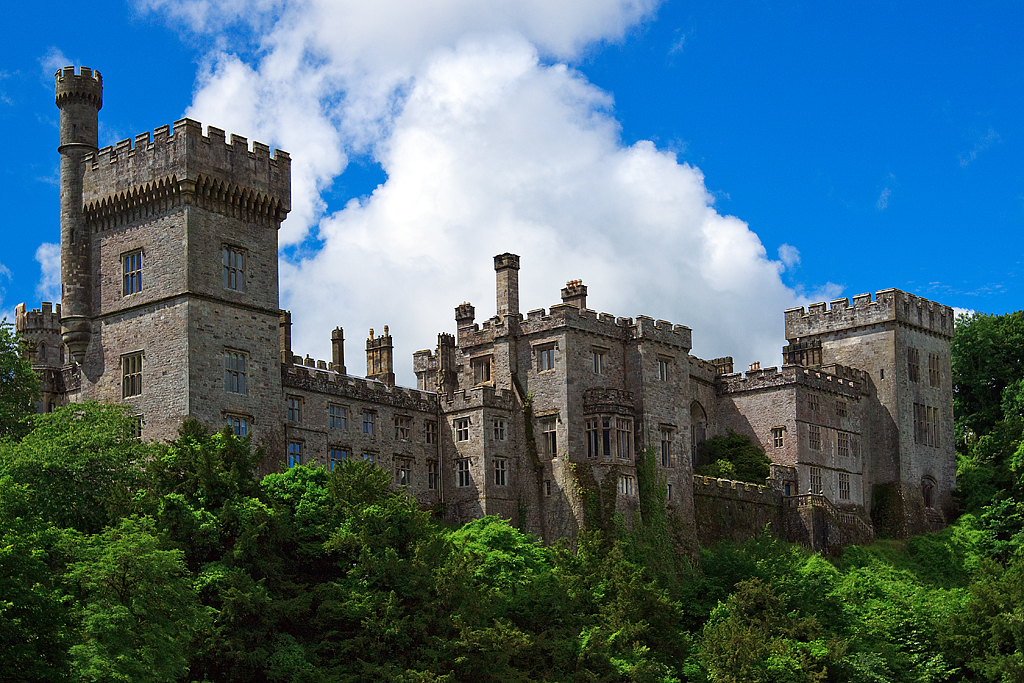
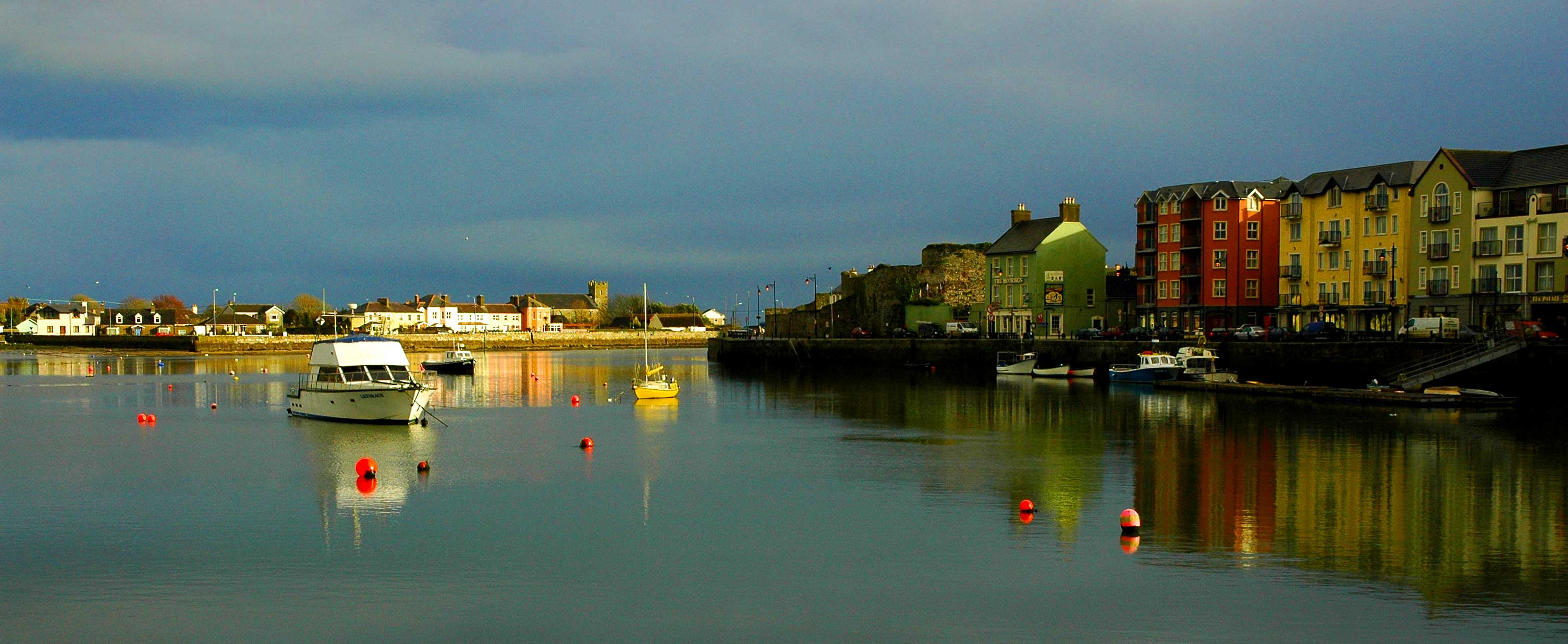
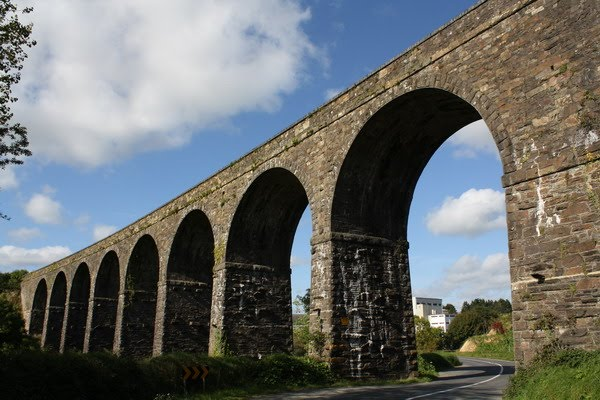
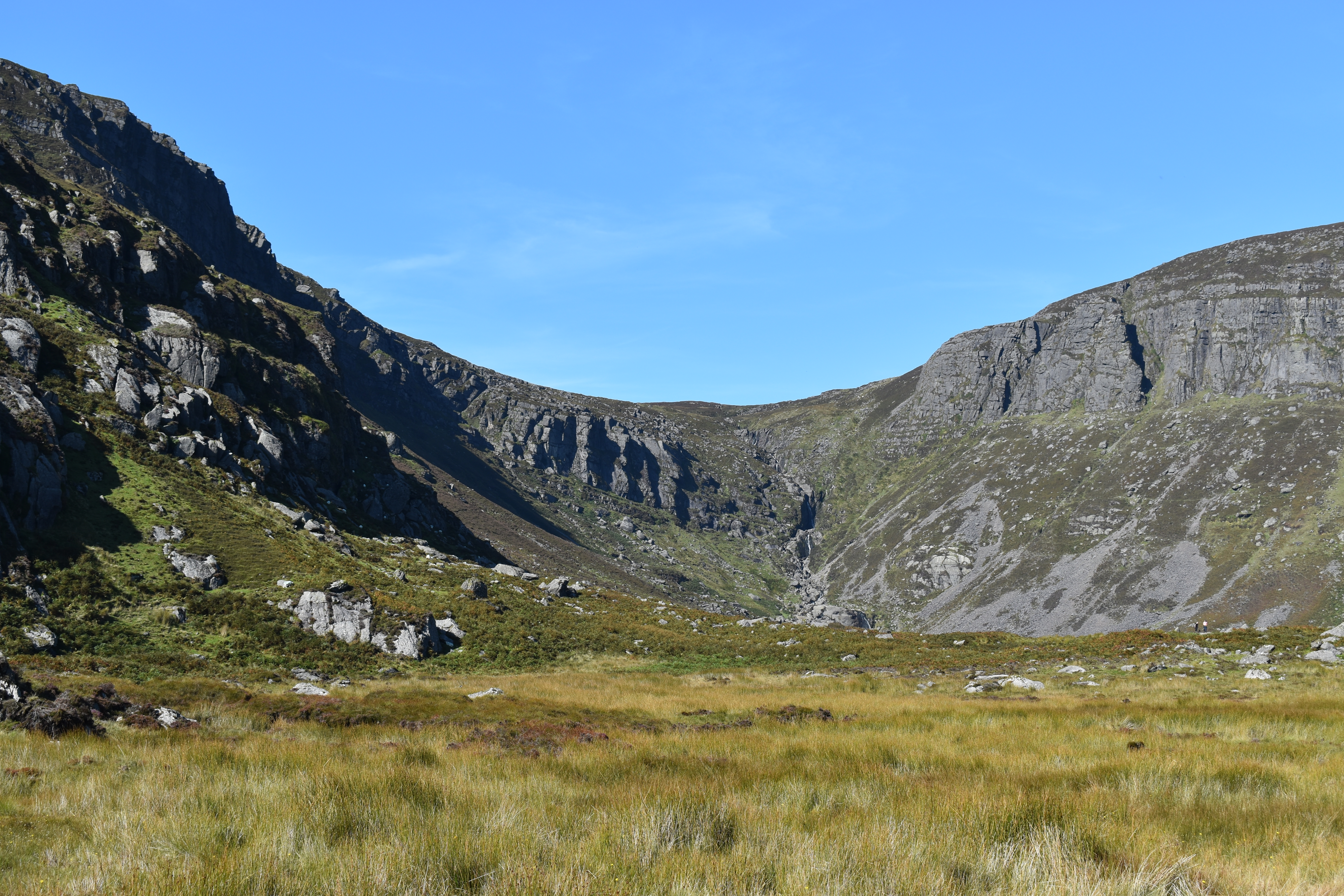
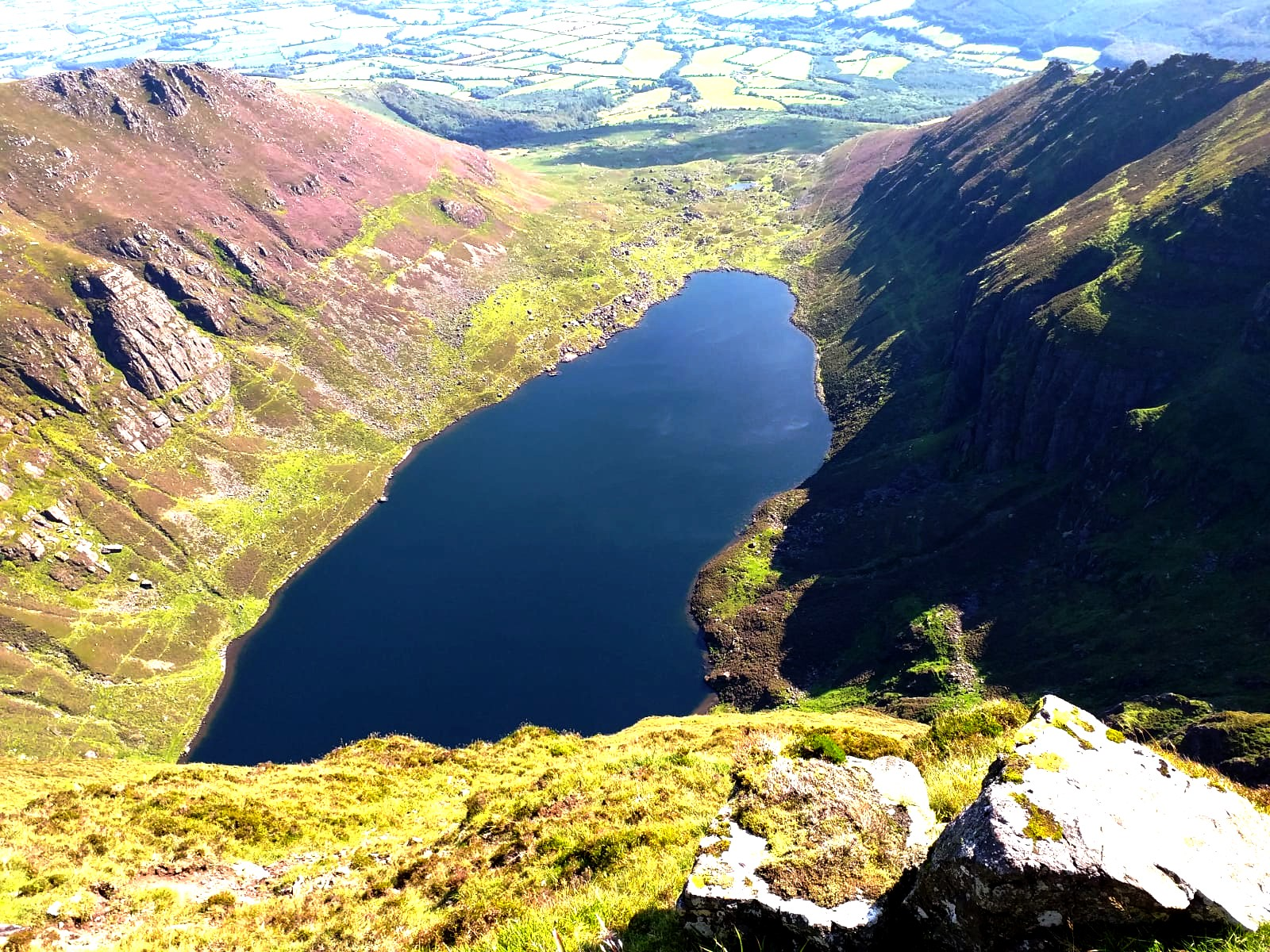
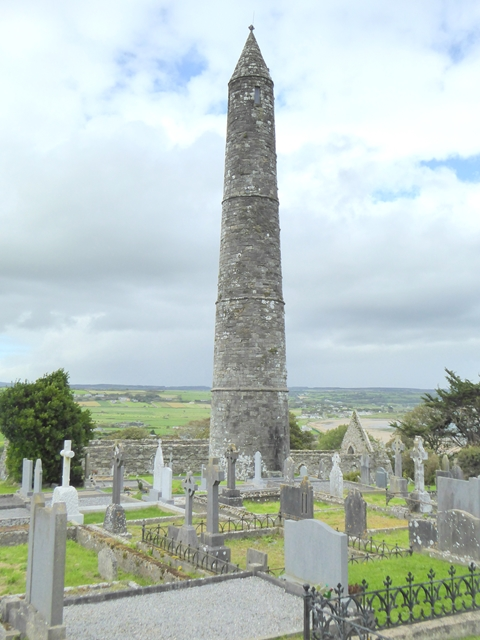
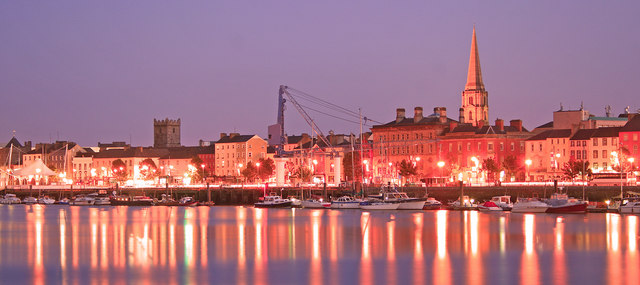
- Lismore Castle Dungarvan Harbour Kilmacthomas Vidauct Mahon Falls Coumshingaun Ardmore Tower Waterford City

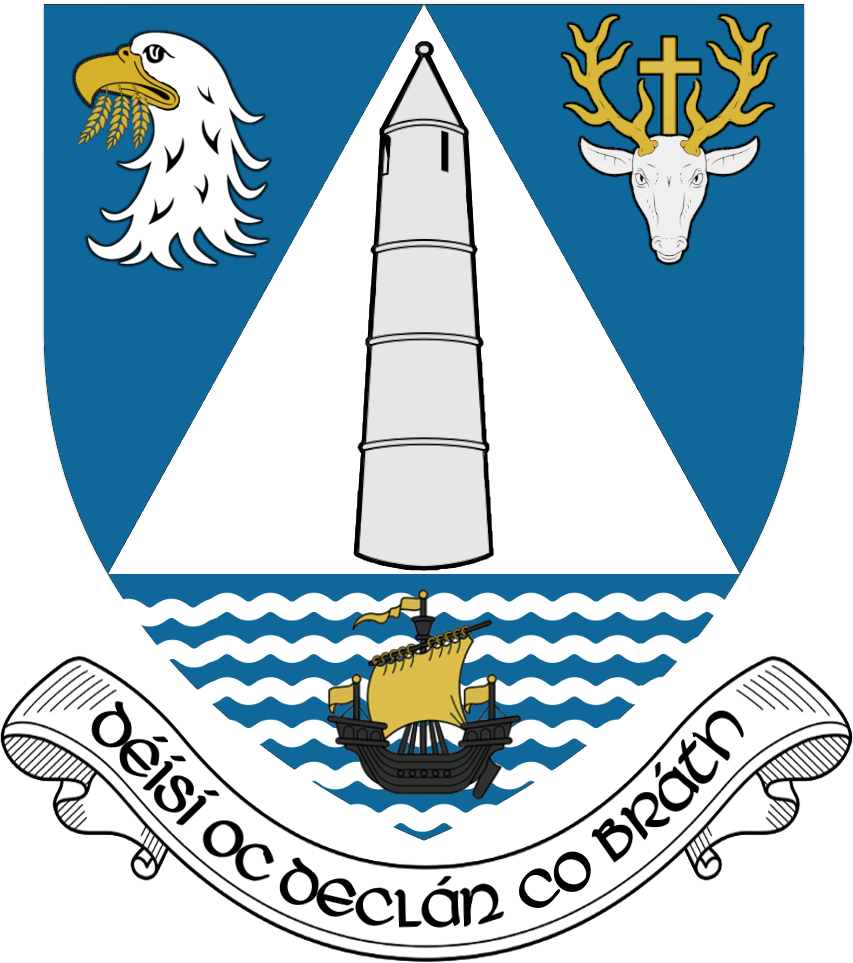
- Coat of arms
- Nickname: The Déise
- Motto: Déisi oc Declán co Bráth (Old Irish) "May the Déise remain with Declan forever"
- Interactive map of County Waterford
- Country: Ireland
- Province: Munster
- Region: Southern
- Established: 1207
- County town: Waterford

Government
  - Local authority: Waterford City and County Council
  - Dáil constituency: Waterford
  - EP constituency: South

Area
  - Total: 1,858 km^{2} (717 sq mi)
  - Rank: 20th
- Highest elevation (Knockmealdown): 792 m (2,598 ft)

Population (2022)
  - Total: 127,363
  - Rank: 20th
  - Density: 68.55/km^{2} (177.5/sq mi)
- Time zone: UTC±0 (WET)
  - Summer (DST): UTC+1 (IST)
- Eircode routing keys: E32, E91, X35, X42, X91 (primarily)
- Telephone area codes: 051, 058 (primarily)
- ISO 3166 code: IE-WD
- Vehicle index mark code: W (since 2014); WD (1987–2013)
- Website: Official website

The island of Ireland, showing location of County Waterford.

County Waterford (Irish: Contae Phort Láirge) is a county in Ireland. It is in the province of Munster and is part of the Southern Region. It is named after the city of Waterford. Waterford City and County Council is the local authority for the county. The population of the county at large, including the city, was 127,363 according to the 2022 census. The county is based on the historic Gaelic territory of the Déise. There is an Irish-speaking area, Gaeltacht na nDéise, in the southwest of the county.

== Etymology ==
County Waterford is colloquially known as "The Déise" (Irish: Na Déise [dʲe:ʃʲɪ]), pronounced "day-shah", and anglicised as Decies. (Note: This can be seen in the names of the baronies of Decies-within-Drum and Decies-without-Drum.) Some time between the 4th and 8th centuries, an Irish tribe called the Déisi were driven from southern county Meath/north Kildare and moved into the Waterford region, conquering and settling there. The ancient territory of the Déise is roughly coextensive with the present-day Roman Catholic Diocese of Waterford and Lismore, thus including part of south County Tipperary.

== History ==
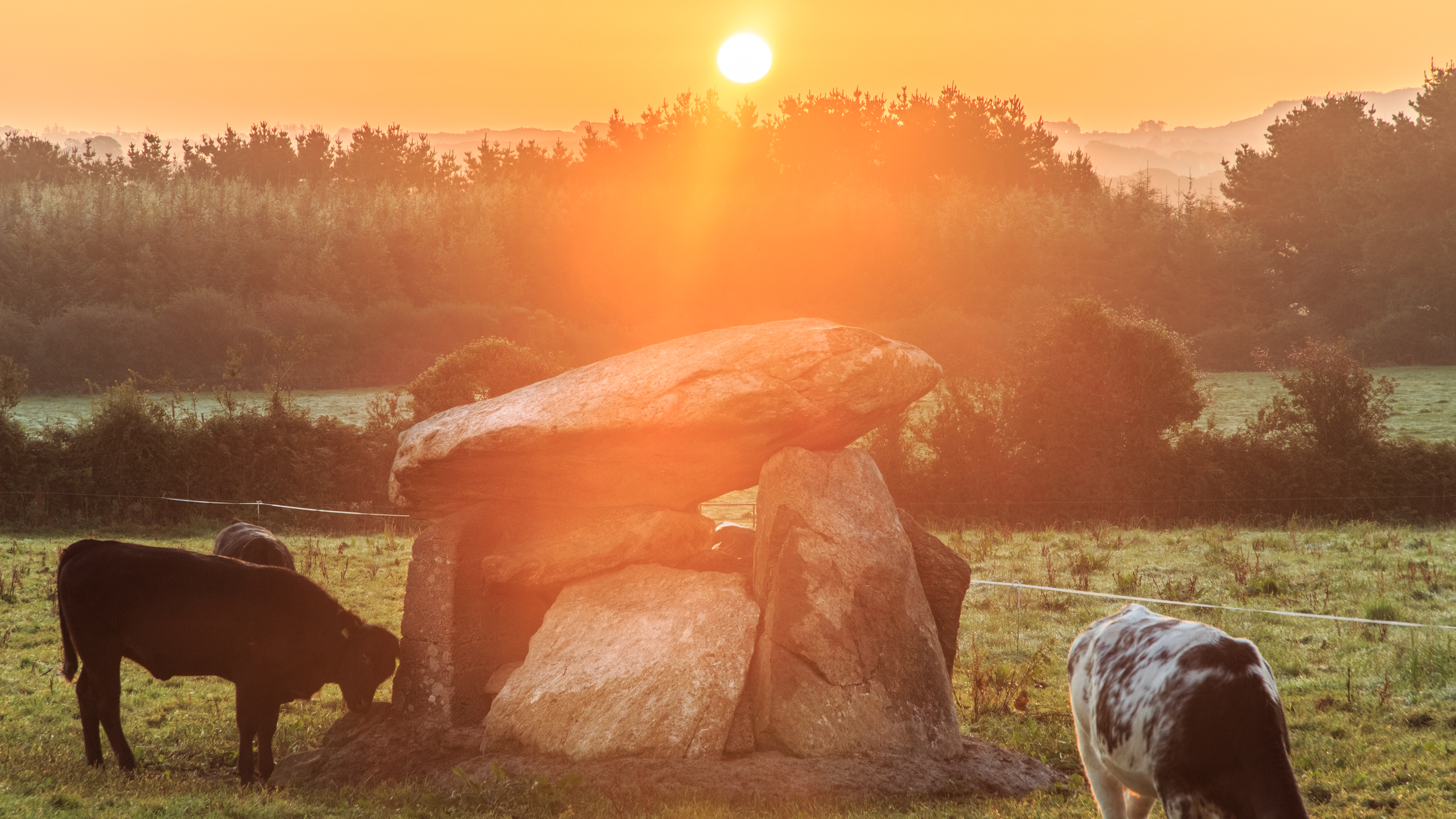
Ballynageeragh Portal Tomb was built in the 4th millennium BC

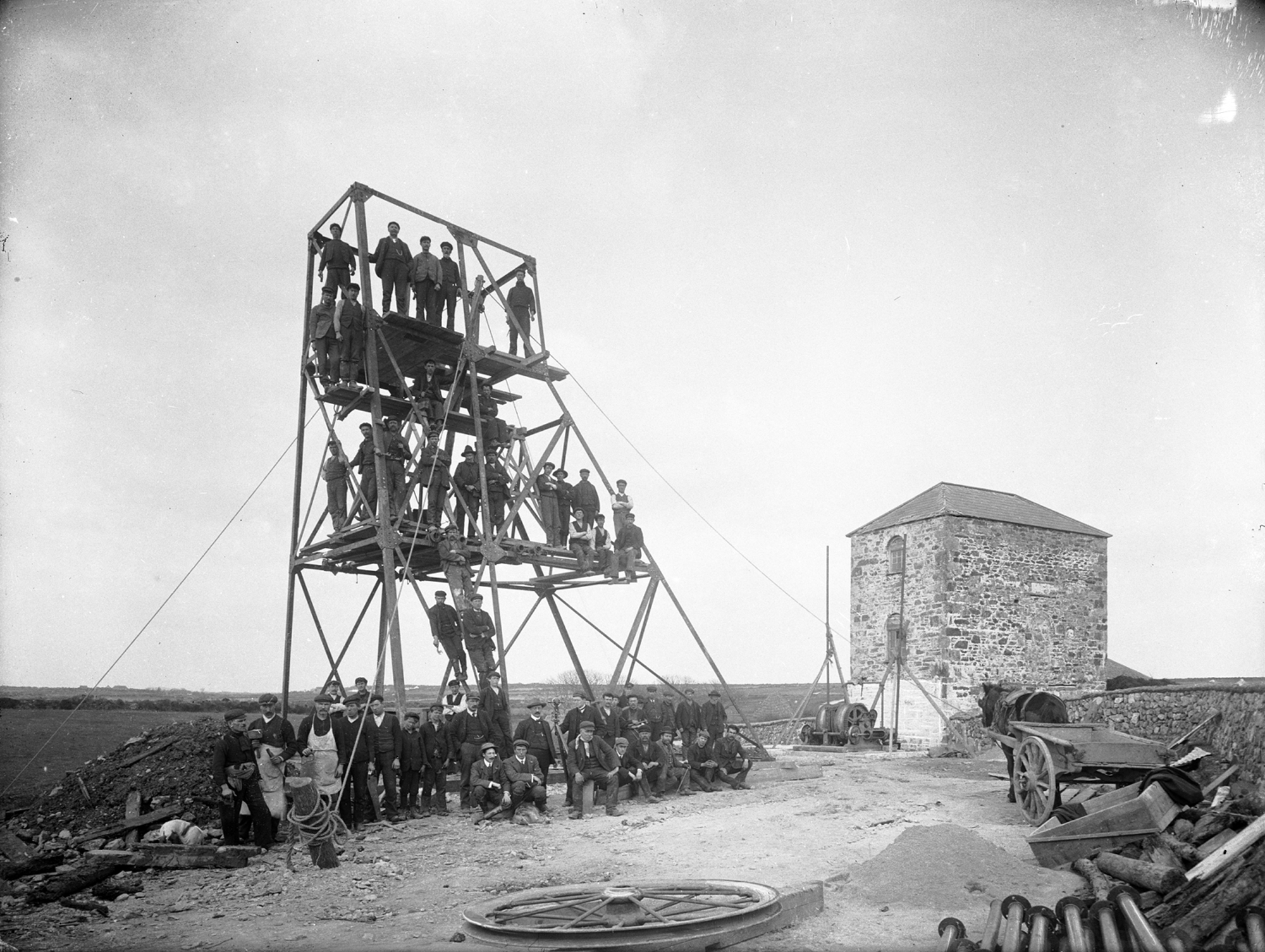
Mine workers at Bunmahon, County Waterford c. 1906

There are many megalithic tombs and ogham stones in the county. The Viking influence can still be seen with Reginald's Tower, one of the first buildings to use a brick and mortar construction method in Ireland. Woodstown, a settlement dating to the 9th century, was discovered 5.5 kilometers (3.4 miles) west of Waterford city. It was the largest settlement outside Scandinavia and the only large-scale 9th-century Viking settlement discovered to date in Western Europe. Other architectural features are products of the Anglo-Norman invasion of Ireland and its effects.

== Geography and subdivisions ==
County Waterford has two mountain ranges, the Knockmealdown Mountains and the Comeragh Mountains. The highest point in the county is Knockmealdown, at 794 m (2,605 ft). It also has many rivers, including Ireland's third-longest river, the River Suir (184 km (114 mi)); and Ireland's fourth-longest river, the Munster Blackwater (168 km (104 mi)). There are over 30 beaches along Waterford's volcanic coastline. A large stretch of this coastline, known as the Copper Coast, has been designated as a UNESCO Geopark, a place of great geological importance. To the west of Dungarvan is the Déise Gaeltacht, an Irish-speaking region comprising the areas of Ring, County Waterford and Old Parish.

Waterford is the county seat; prior to the merger of the 2 Waterford authorities in June 2014 Dungarvan was the county seat for Waterford County Council.

=== Baronies ===
There are eight historic baronies in the county: Coshmore and Coshbride, Decies-within-Drum, Decies-without-Drum, Gaultiere, Glenahiry, Middlethird, Upperthird and Waterford City. The westernmost of the baronies are Decies-within-Drum and Decies-without-Drum, separated by the Drum-Fineen hills.

=== Largest towns ===
Historical population
Year	Pop.	±%
1600	14,456	—
1610	9,887	−31.6%
1653	13,136	+32.9%
1659	13,286	+1.1%
1821	76,103	+472.8%
1831	85,217	+12.0%
1841	196,187	+130.2%
1851	164,035	−16.4%
1861	134,252	−18.2%
1871	123,310	−8.2%
1881	112,768	−8.5%
1891	98,251	−12.9%
1901	87,187	−11.3%
1911	83,966	−3.7%
1926	78,562	−6.4%
1936	77,614	−1.2%
1946	76,108	−1.9%
1951	75,061	−1.4%
1956	74,031	−1.4%
1961	71,439	−3.5%
1966	73,080	+2.3%
1971	77,315	+5.8%
1979	87,278	+12.9%
1981	88,591	+1.5%
1986	91,151	+2.9%
1991	91,624	+0.5%
1996	94,680	+3.3%
2002	101,546	+7.3%
2006	107,961	+6.3%
2011	113,795	+5.4%
2016	116,176	+2.1%
2022	127,363	+9.6%

Rank	Town	Population (2022 census)
1	Waterford	60,079
2	Tramore	11,277
3	Dungarvan	10,081
4	Portlaw	1,881
5	Dunmore East	1,731
6	Ballinroad	1,389
7	Lismore	1,347
8	Tallow	1,022

== Local government and politics ==
As of 1 June 2014, Waterford City and County Council is the local government authority for the local government area of Waterford City and County. The authority was formed following the merger of the local government areas of the county of Waterford and the city of Waterford under the Local Government Reform Act 2014, and succeeded the functions of Waterford City Council and Waterford County Council. The local authority is responsible for certain local services such as sanitation, planning and real-estate development, libraries, the collection of automobile taxation, local roads and social housing.

For elections to Dáil Éireann, the county is represented by the 4-seat constituency of Waterford. For European elections, the city and county are part of the 5-seat South constituency.

== Gaeltacht ==
The Waterford Gaeltacht (Gaeltacht na nDéise) is a Gaeltacht area in County Waterford, consisting of the parish of An Rinn and An Sean Phobal. Gaeltacht na nDéise is located 10 kilometres (6.2 miles) from the town of Dungarvan, has a population of 1,816 people (Census 2016) and encompasses a geographical area of 62 km^{2}. According to Census 2016 the daily Irish speakers in Gaeltacht na nDéise was 45.6%.

== Culture ==
- In the Willows, alternative folk band from Waterford

== See also ==
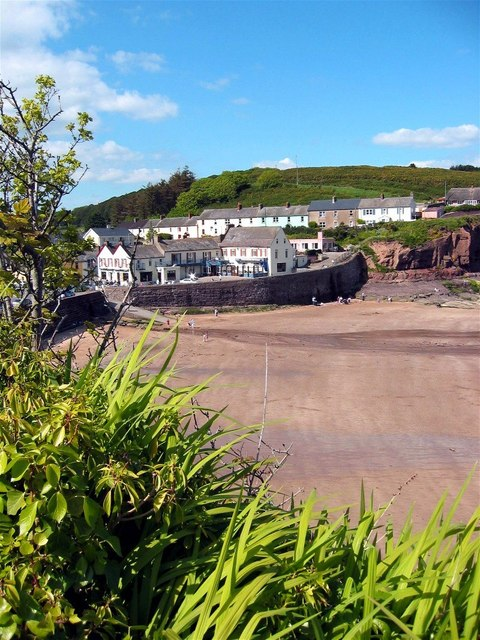
Counsellors strand

- High Sheriff of County Waterford
- Lord Lieutenant of Waterford
- List of abbeys and priories in the Republic of Ireland (County Waterford)
- Saint Declan
- Limerick–Rosslare railway line
