= Reginald's Tower =

- Túr Raghnaill
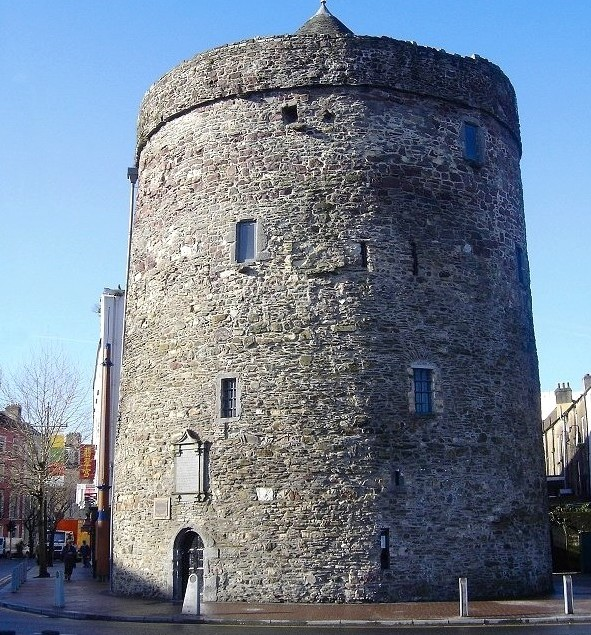
- Reginald's Tower in Waterford, Ireland

- Location within Ireland

General information
- Type: Fortified tower
- Location: Waterford, Ireland
- Coordinates: 52°15′37.5″N 7°6′19.5″W
- Renovated: 13th–14th century

Height
- Height: 54 ft (16 m)

Dimensions
- Diameter: 42½ ft

Technical details
- Material: Stone

National monument of Ireland
- Official name: Reginald's Tower
- Reference no.: 661

Reginald's Tower (Irish: Túr Raghnaill) is a historic tower in Waterford, Munster, Ireland. It is located at the eastern end of the city quay. The tower has been in usage for different purposes for many centuries and is an important landmark in Waterford and an important remnant of its medieval urban defence system. It is the oldest civic building in Ireland and it is the only urban monument in Ireland to retain a Norse or Viking name.

== Early history ==
Reginald's Tower was built by the Anglo-Normans after their conquest of Waterford, replacing an earlier Viking fortification. The tower's name is derived from an Anglicised form of the Irish name Raghnall, which is in turn a Gaelicised form of the Old Norse Røgnvaldr. The tower's name seems to refer to one of the many Viking rulers of the town that bore the name. One possibility is that it refers to Ragnall Mac Gilla Muire, the last Hiberno-Norse ruler of the town. The present tower is likely to have been built in the 13th or 14th century; it may have been constructed between 1253 and 1280. In 1185 Prince John of England landed in Waterford and organised the rebuilding of the city's defences, including the tower.

The tower is 54 feet high; its horizontal cross section is circular. It is 42½ feet in diameter and is surmounted by a conical roof. A spiral staircase ascends within the thick walls - these are 10 feet wide at the base, tapering down to 7 feet at the top. It was part of the ancient city walls of Waterford and could be considered the apex of a triangle formed by three structures — Turgesius Tower on Barronstrand Street, St. Martins Castle on Lady Lane, and Reginald’s Tower at the quay and the mall. It was strategically located on the high ground between a branch of St. John's River on the southeast (since drained, and now known as the Mall) and the River Suir to the north. It is also very close to the historic French Church. The site is sometimes called Dundory (an Irish word which means "fort of oak"), and hence the tower is occasionally called the Dundory Tower. It is also known as the Ring Tower. It was one of seventeen towers which encircled the city of Waterford in medieval times. Today it is the largest of the six surviving towers, which are considered the finest examples of medieval urban defence in Ireland. The other surviving towers are the Watch Tower, Double Tower, French Tower, Semi-Lunar Tower and Beach Tower.

== Medieval history ==
The tower has been used as a mint, a prison, and a military storehouse. It is also famous for being the location of the wedding of Richard de Clare, the second Earl of Pembroke, and Aoife (pronounced eefa), daughter of Dermot MacMurrough, King of Leinster. It occasionally served as a royal castle, and was visited by King John in 1210, who ordered new coins to be struck there. Richard II visited the tower in 1394 and again in 1399. He used the tower to store his munitions. On 27 July 1399 Richard left Reginald's Tower as King of England and Wales; on his arrival in England he was captured by the future Henry IV and forced to abdicate.

In 1463, coins were minted in Reginald's Tower by order of the Irish Parliament, which, at that time, was meeting in the city. The coins had the words "Civitas Waterford" struck on one side. In 1495, the tower’s cannons successfully deterred the forces of Perkin Warbeck, the pretender to the throne of Henry VII. Cannons from the tower sank one of his ships during an 11-day siege. This was the first successful use of artillery by an Irish city. A cannon from this ship was recovered from the River Suir in 1901. This victory earned the city its motto Urbs Intacta Manet - "Waterford remains the unconquered city".

In 1649, Waterford was besieged by the army of the English parliamentarian Oliver Cromwell, but he failed to capture the city on that occasion. They returned in 1650, and this time they were successful. A cannonball, visible high up the wall on the north side of the building, is lodged firmly in the wall, and is reputed to be from this siege.

In 1690, following his defeat at the Battle of the Boyne, James II of England is said to have climbed to the top of the tower to take a last look at his lost kingdom before embarking for exile in France.

During the 17th and 18th centuries, the tower was used to store munitions. In the early 19th century it functioned as a prison.

== Present day ==
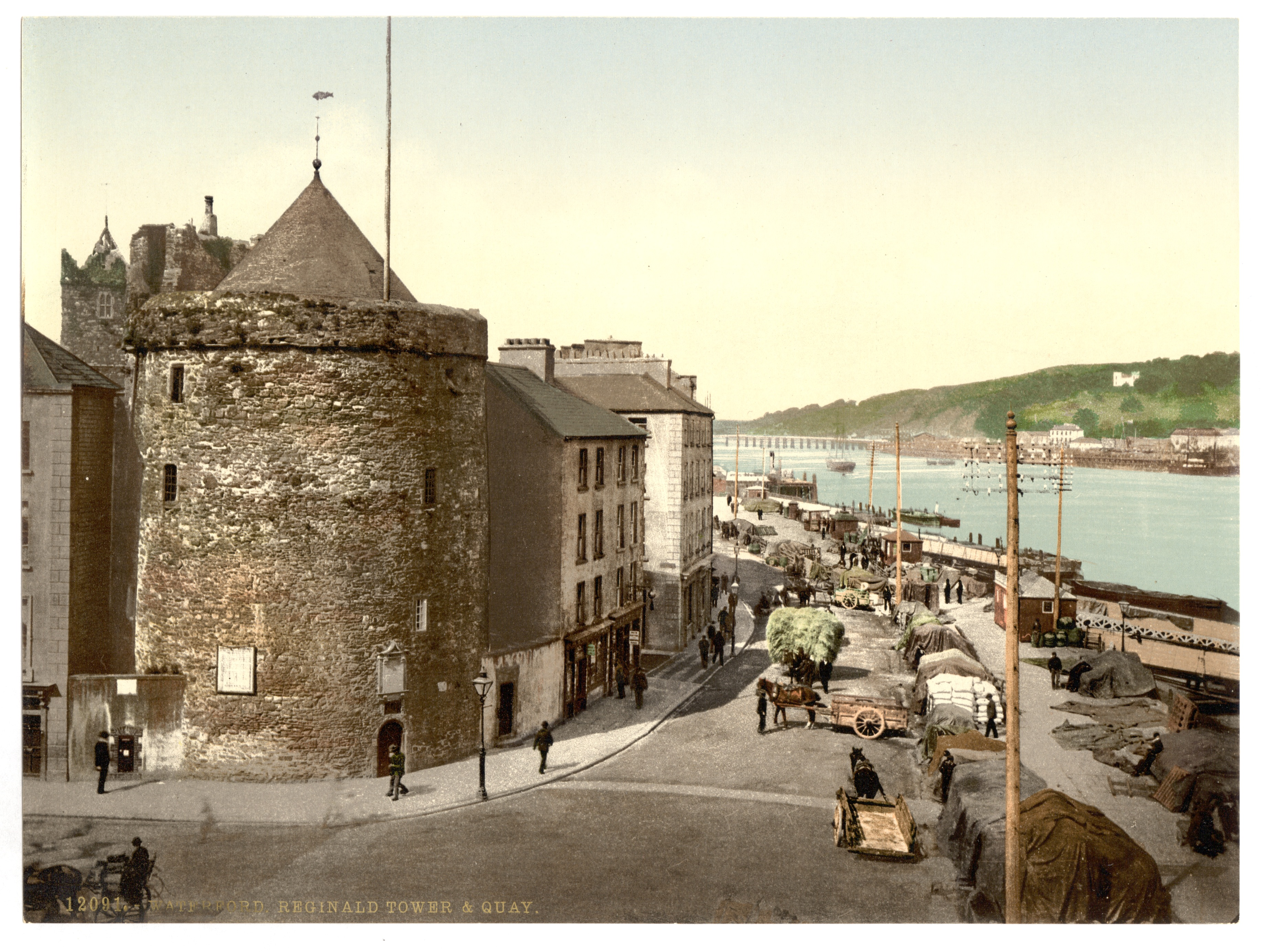
Reginald's Tower and the quay, c. 1900

In 1861, Reginald's Tower became the property of the Waterford Corporation, and the residence of the Chief Constable of Waterford. It continued to be inhabited until 1954, when the last resident left and the building was turned into a museum. During the Emergency it functioned as an air raid shelter. It currently houses the Waterford Viking Museum and exhibits many of the archaeological finds from the 2003 dig at Woodstown on the River Suir near the city.

It is located in the area of Waterford Viking Triangle in the centre of Waterford city. A replica Viking longship is exhibited beside Reginald's Tower.

== See also ==
- List of National Monuments in County Waterford
- History of Waterford

== Bibliography ==
- Smith, Charles (1746). The Ancient and Present State of the County and City of Waterford.
- Power, Patrick C. (1933). A Short History of County Waterford.
- McEneaney, Éamonn (2001). Discover Waterford. O'Brien Press. ISBN 9780862786564.
- Halpin, A; Newman, C (2006). Ireland: An Oxford Archaeological Guide to Sites from Earliest Times to AD 1600. Oxford Archaeological Guides. Oxford: Oxford University Press. ISBN 978-0-19-280671-0.
- Walsh, Joseph J. (1968). Waterford's Yesterdays and Tomorrows and an Outline of Waterford History. Munster Express. ISBN 9780950205618.
- Wilson, A (2014). Birkett, T; Lee, C (eds.). The Vikings in Munster (PDF). Languages, Myths and Finds (series vol. 3). Centre for the Study of the Viking Age, University of Nottingham. pp. 20–32. ISBN 9780853583004.
