= Watch Tower (Waterford) =

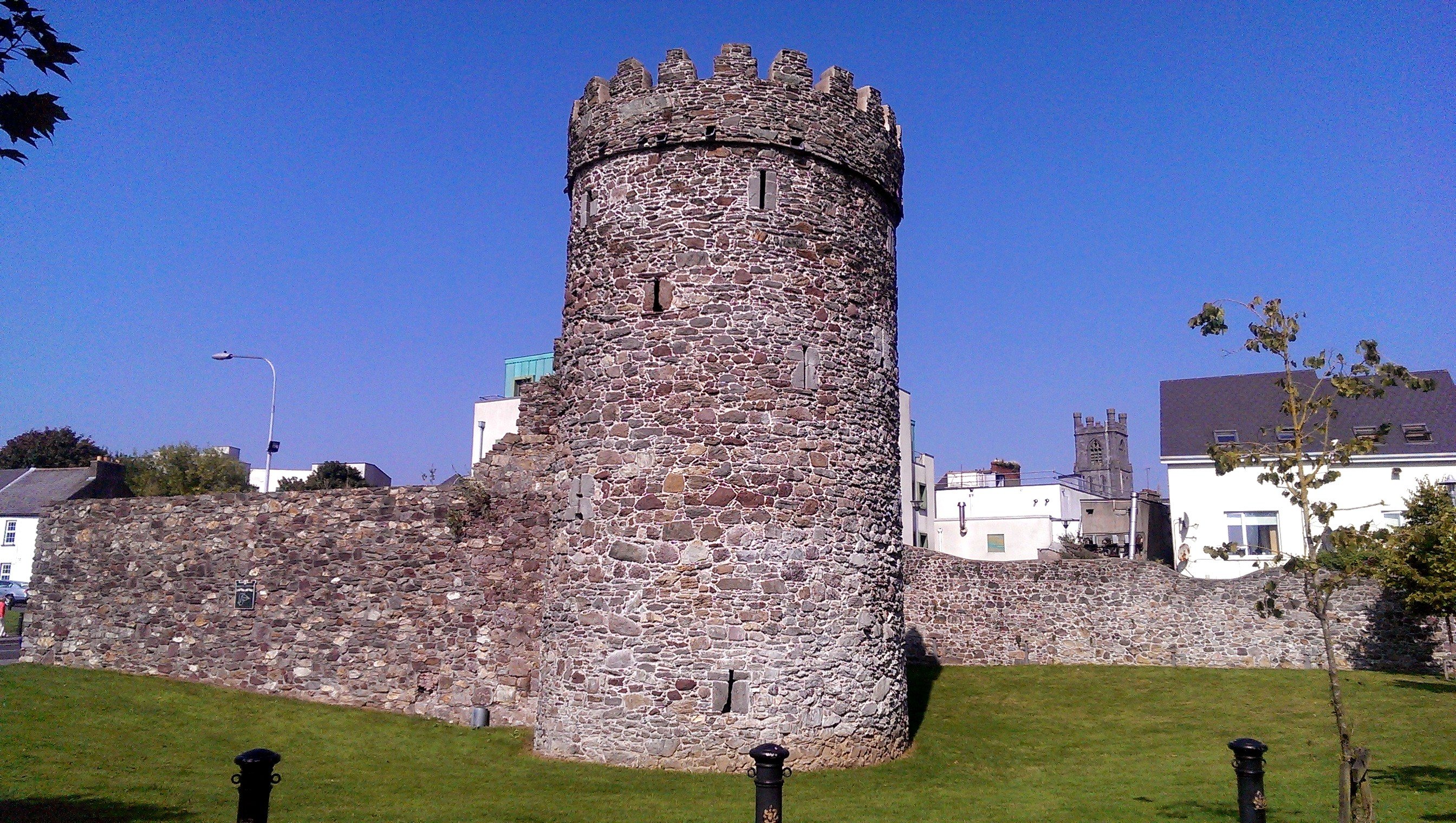
- The Watch Tower in Waterford, Ireland

- Location within Ireland

General information
- Type: Fortified tower
- Location: Waterford, Ireland
- Coordinates: 52°15′22.49″N 7°6′45.09″W
- Construction started: 13th century
- Renovated: 15th century

Technical details
- Material: Stone

The Watch Tower is a tower on Manor Street in Waterford, Munster, Ireland. It is one of the six surviving towers of the city walls of Waterford. The cylindrical shape of the tower suggests that it was built in the 13th century. The arrow slit openings, or embrasures, with a gun loop at the bottom indicate that the tower was modified in the 15th or 16th century to facilitate artillery operations. The tower does not have any windows on the city side; it was built solely as a defensive structure without a secondary use as a dwelling. At the rear of the tower there are two entrances, one at ground level and another at wall-walk level.

The Close Gate once stood on the western side of the tower, where the road now runs. The gate was demolished in the eighteenth century by Bullocks Wyse of the Manor of St. John to facilitate easier access to his estate.

The other surviving towers are the Reginald's Tower, Double Tower, French Tower, Semi-Lunar Tower and Beach Tower

== See also ==
- List of National Monuments in County Waterford
- History of Waterford
