= List of national monuments in County Waterford =

The Irish state has officially approved the following list of national monuments in County Waterford. In the Republic of Ireland, a structure or site may be deemed to be a "national monument", and therefore worthy of state protection, if it is of national importance. If the land adjoining the monument is essential to protect it, this land may also be protected.

== National Monuments ==
NM#	Monument name	Description	Image	Townland	Location
131	Ardmore Cathedral	Cathedral, Round Tower & Oratory		Ardocheasty	51°56′56″N 7°43′34″W
384	Ballynageeragh Portal Tomb	Portal Tomb		Ballynageeragh	52°10′40″N 7°16′37″W
330	Kiltera Ogham Stones	Ogham Stones		Dromore	52°04′28″N 7°50′56″W
154	Drumlohan Souterrain and Ogham Stones	Souterrain & Ogham Stones		Drumlohan	52°09′48″N 7°27′55″W
569	Dungarvan Castle	Castle		Dungarvan	52°05′21″N 7°36′58″W
398	Gaulstown Portal Tomb	Portal Tomb		Gaulstown	52°12′21″N 7°12′38″W
421	Knockeen Portal Tomb	Portal Tomb		Knockeen	52°12′26″N 7°09′34″W
237	Matthewstown Passage Tomb	Passage Tomb		Matthewstown	52°10′33″N 7°13′38″W
132	Mothel Abbey	Priory (Augustinian)		Mothel	52°17′54″N 7°25′07″W
671	Double Tower	Town Defences		Waterford	52°15′23″N 7°06′43″W
661	Reginald's Tower	Town Defences		Waterford	52°15′38″N 7°06′19″W
205	French Church, Waterford	Friary Church (Franciscan)		Waterford	52°15′38″N 7°06′24″W

== Sources ==
- National Monuments in County Waterford

== See also ==
- National Monument (Ireland)
