= French Tower =

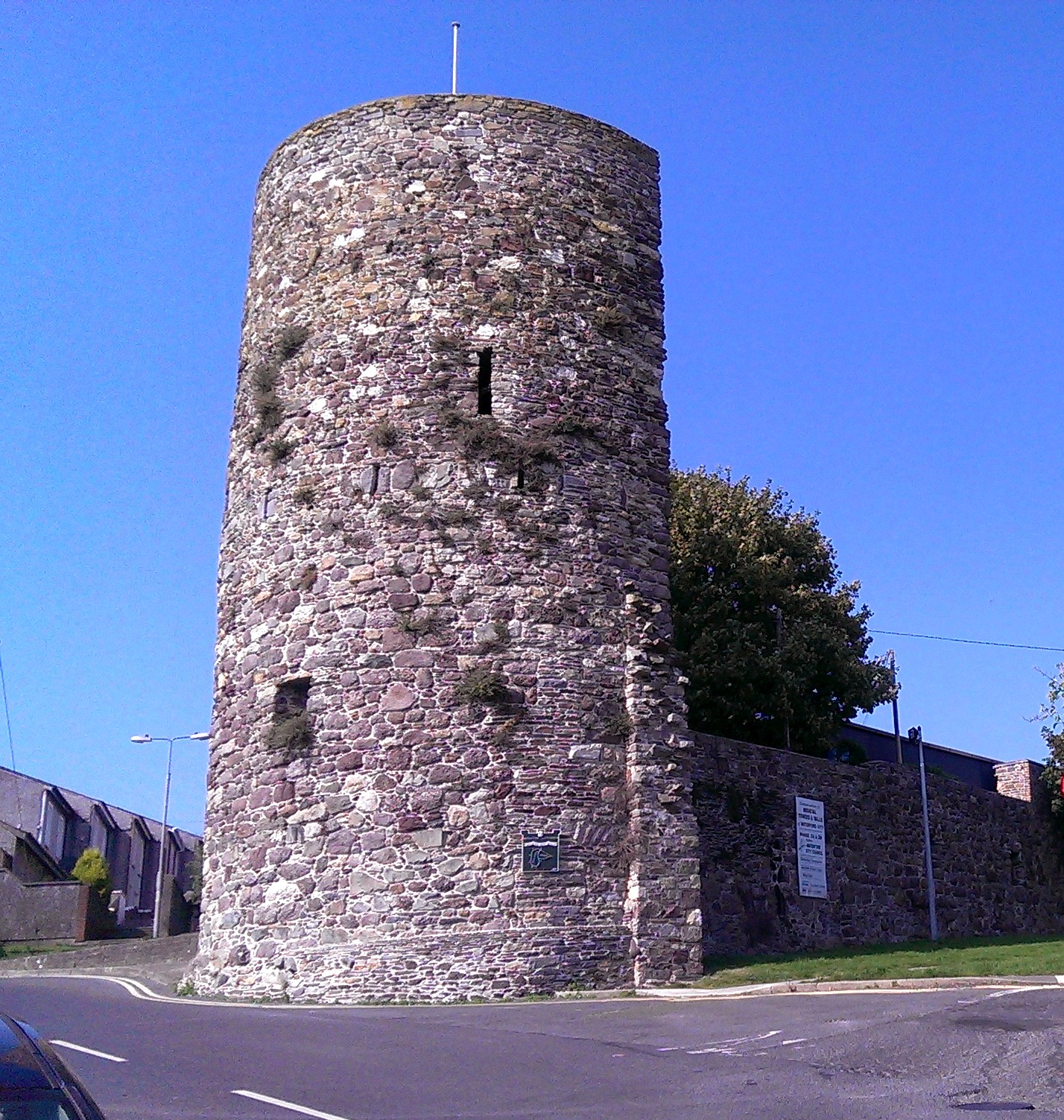
- The French Tower

- Location within Ireland

General information
- Type: Fortified tower
- Location: Waterford, Ireland
- Coordinates: 52°15′26.048″N 7°6′51.56″W
- Construction started: 13th-14th century
- Renovated: 15th century

Technical details
- Material: Stone

The French Tower is a tower at the top of Castle Street in Waterford, Munster, Ireland. It is one of the six surviving towers of the city walls of Waterford. The tower most likely dates from the 13th or 14th century. The origin of the name is uncertain, but it may well be connected with the large French community which lived in Waterford from the period following the Battle of the Boyne in 1690. Many of these people were of Huguenot origin, and their descendants still live in Waterford to this day. The tower is located at the point where the city wall makes a sharp turn, coming up from Manor Street, past Double Tower, and then continuing in a northerly direction to Newgate Street along Browns Lane.

== Layout ==
The horizontal cross section of the tower is kidney-shaped, which offers the maximum defensive view of the wall while occupying the smallest possible space inside the wall. The ground and first floors probably date from the reign of Henry III. The upper floors were probably added in the fifteenth century to accommodate small guns and cannons.

Other surviving Waterford city wall towers are the Watch Tower (Waterford), Double Tower, Reginald's Tower, Semi-Lunar Tower and Beach Tower.

== See also ==
- List of National Monuments in County Waterford
- History of Waterford
