= Tramore =

Seaside town in County Waterford, Ireland

Tramore Trá Mhór
- Town
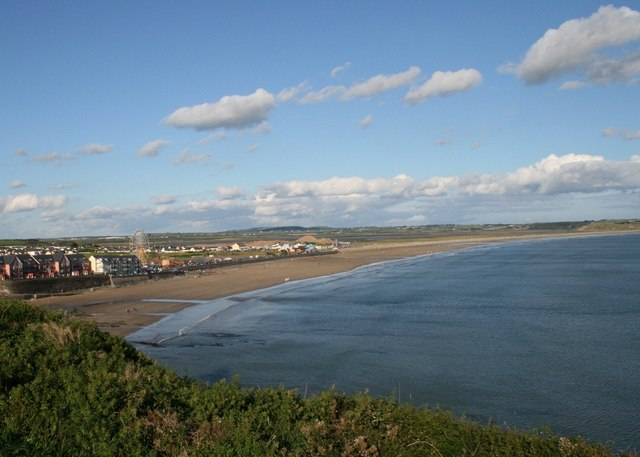
- Tramore Beach

- Coat of arms
- Motto: θάλασσά θάλασσά thalassa thalassa (Greek) "The Sea, The Sea"
- Location within Ireland
- Coordinates: 52.1588°N 7.1463°W
- Country: Ireland
- Province: Munster
- County: Waterford

Area
  - Total: 4.96 km^{2} (1.92 sq mi)
- Elevation: 20 m (66 ft)

Population (2022)
  - Total: 11,277
- Eircode routing key: X91
- Telephone area code: +353(0)51
- Irish Grid Reference: S576014

Tramore (/trəˈmɔːr/; Irish: Trá Mhór, meaning 'big beach') is a seaside town in County Waterford, on the southeast coast of Ireland. It has a population of 11,277 as per the 2022 census, the second largest town in the county.

== Overview ==
Originally a small fishing village, the area saw rapid development upon the arrival of the railway from Waterford City in 1853, when the town flourished as a tourist destination. As the population grew steadily in the latter part of the 20th century, Tramore became a satellite and dormitory town of Waterford City, situated some 13 km (8 miles) to the north. Today the town is a popular destination for surfing and other water sports due to its large, sheltered bay and provision of accommodation and amenities.

== Geography ==
The town is situated on the north-western corner of Tramore Bay on a hill that slopes down to the strand, or sand spit, that divides the bay. Behind the spit lies the tidal lagoon known as the "Backstrand".

Tramore's sand dunes and back strand were designated a Special Area of Conservation by the National Parks & Wildlife Service, with Tramore Eco Group working to advance the conservation and protection of this areas' ecological environment and wildlife habitats.

== Archaeology ==
The area within a 16 km (10 mi) radius of Tramore is rich in megalithic structures including Ballindud Cromlech, Ballynageeragh Portal Tomb, Knockeen Dolmen and Gaulstown Portal Tomb, signifying habitation long before Christianity.

== History ==
There is a record of a settlement at Tramore in 1809, when a church was built.

The Topological Dictionary of Ireland of 1837 notes that Drumcannon Parish (including Tramore) had 4835 inhabitants. There was one endowed school, one school supported by local subscription, three private schools and a Sunday School. Tramore also had an almshouse at that time.

=== The Sea Horse tragedy ===
On 30 January 1816, the transport ship Sea Horse foundered in Tramore Bay with the 2nd battalion of the 59th Regiment of Foot on board. 292 men and 71 women and children perished. A monument to the incident is located on Doneraile Walk and an obelisk marks a burial plot at Christ Church on Church Road.

The town's connection to the tragedy led to the image of a seahorse being adopted as a symbol of the town of Tramore and later adopted as the logo for Waterford Crystal in 1955.

=== The Metal Man ===
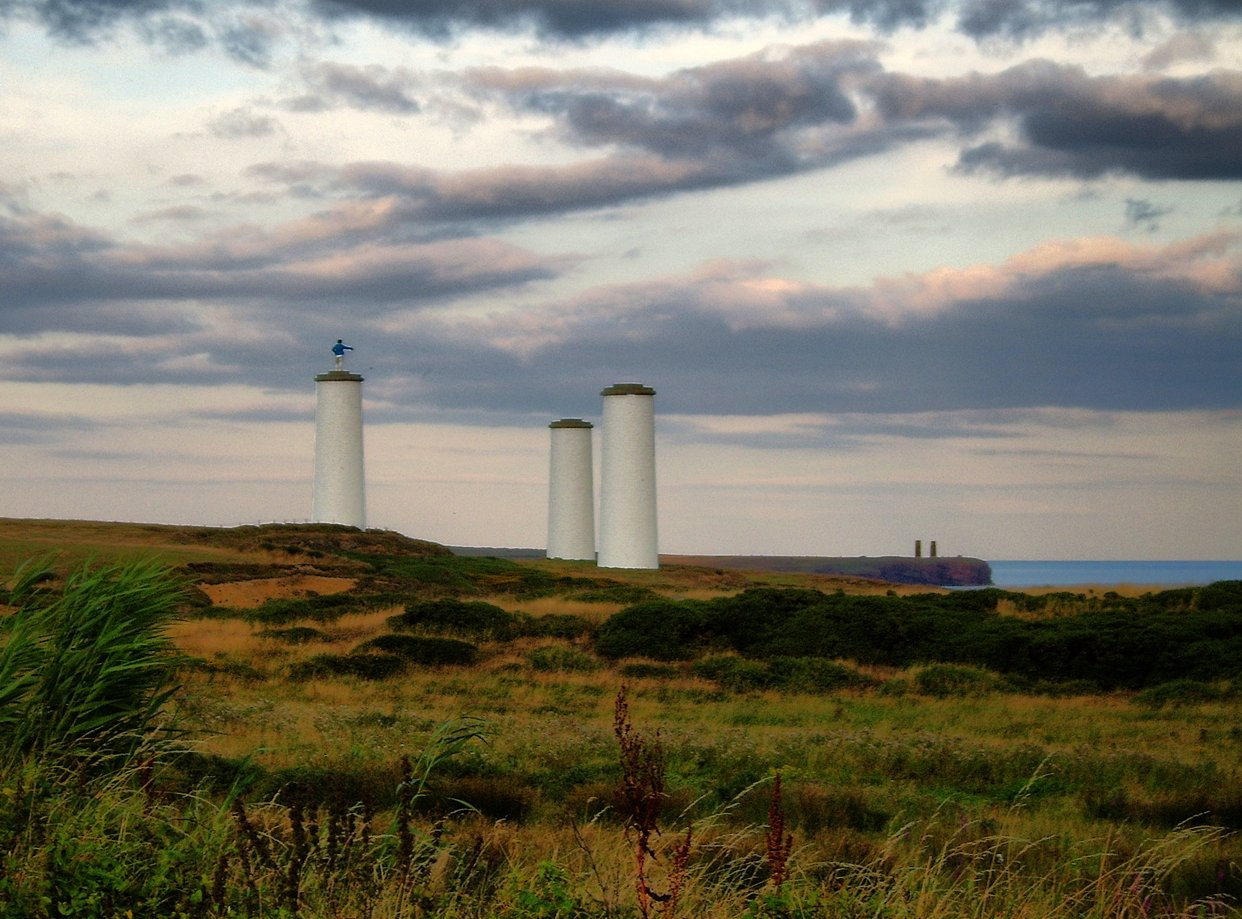
The "Metal Man" statue is visible on the leftmost of the three pillars.

From the sea, Tramore Bay can be easily confused with the traditional safe haven of the Suir estuary. After the sinking of the Sea Horse, its insurers Lloyd's of London funded the building of piers and the erection of pillars on two headlands as a visual aid to prevent similar calamities from happening. The pillars, three on Newtown Head and two on Brownstown Head, were erected in 1823.

"The Metal Man" is a 3-metre tall cast-metal figure of a sailor pointing seawards, set atop the central pillar on Newtown Head. According to local lore, he is said to warn seafarers away from dangerous shallow waters by calling out "keep off, keep off, good ship from me, for I am the rock of misery".

=== The Guillamene ===
The Newtown and Guillamene swimming coves are located just off Cliff Road at the base of Newtown Head. Until the early 1980s, the Guillamene was a men-only swimming cove. Women and children were expected to bathe at Newtown. The "men-only" sign has been preserved as a reminder of times past, but today both coves are popular with swimmers of both genders and all ages.

=== The Waterford and Tramore Railway ===
Before the late 18th century, Tramore was a small fishing hamlet. In 1853, a 12 km (7 mile)-long railway line was opened between Waterford's Railway Square to the terminus in Tramore. It was unique in that it was not connected to any other line. This closed on 1 January 1961.

=== The Pickardstown ambush ===
On the night of 6 June 1921, during the Irish War of Independence, 50 local IRA Volunteers attempted to ambush a party of 40 British troops from Waterford City, who were coming to Tramore following an attack on the RIC barracks there. The ambush took place at Pickardstown, about a mile to the north of Tramore. The ambush failed to go according to plan as they could not see in the dark field. This caused the death of two IRA men with two more wounded. Tramore's Micheál MacCraith GAA Club is named after one of the dead Volunteers.

Historical population
Year	Pop.	±%
1813	726	—
1821	889	+22.5%
1831	2,224	+150.2%
1841	1,120	−49.6%
1851	1,882	+68.0%
1861	1,847	−1.9%
1871	2,011	+8.9%
1881	2,036	+1.2%
1891	1,850	−9.1%
1901	1,733	−6.3%
1911	1,644	−5.1%
1926	1,812	+10.2%
1936	2,047	+13.0%
1946	2,379	+16.2%
1951	2,825	+18.7%
1956	2,919	+3.3%
1961	2,882	−1.3%
1966	3,271	+13.5%
1971	3,792	+15.9%
1981	5,635	+48.6%
1986	5,999	+6.5%
1991	6,064	+1.1%
1996	6,536	+7.8%
2002	8,305	+27.1%
2006	9,635	+16.0%
2011	10,328	+7.2%
2016	10,381	+0.5%
2022	11,277	+8.6%

== Tourism ==
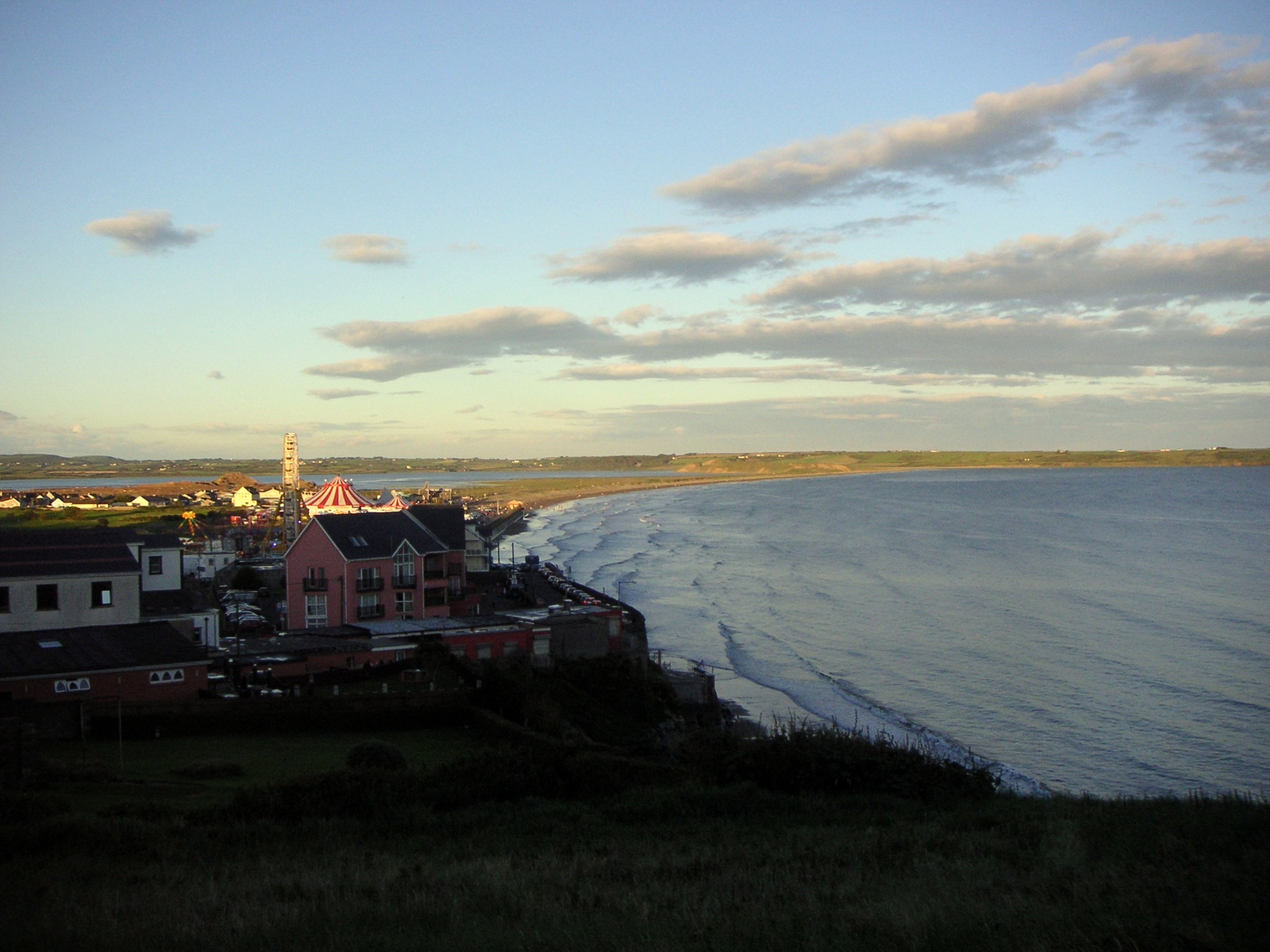
The Strand in Tramore

The town has long been associated with Irish tourists and offered a traditional seaside experience of ice cream, fairground and beachfront. Tramore has 5 kilometres (3.1 mi) of beach and sand dunes looking out into the Atlantic Ocean. Tramore has a reputation for surfing.

=== Waterford and Tramore Racecourse ===
Tramore is known for a horse-racing festival that has been held every August for more than 200 years. The horses used to run along the strand, the route later moved to a purpose-built racecourse. Soon after the railway arrived, Lord Doneraile and James Delahunty built a racecourse at Riverstown. Racing continued here until 1911 when the area finally succumbed to the sea, and, at low tide, one can still see part of the racecourse from the back strand.

Tramore Racecourse was built at Graun Hill in 1912. The course has been developed and improved and is regularly used as a venue for shows and music events.

=== Surfing ===
Surfing / Tramore
BREAK TYPE	beach
WAVE DIRECTION	right and left
IDEAL WIND	North
IDEAL SWELL	southerly
IDEAL TIDE	Mid-high
HAZARDS	None
AVERAGE WATER TEMPS	9 °C – 15 °C

Tramore has become renowned as a surfing location in Ireland, as well as other watersports including kitesurfing and windsurfing. The sport was first brought to the town in 1967 by Irish surfing pioneer Kevin Cavey. There are many good breaks in and around Tramore, Killmurren Cove, Dunmore East, Bunmahon and Annestown.

== People ==
- Shay Brennan, footballer for Manchester United, died here
- John Edward Carew, sculptor, was born here
- Mary D. Cullen, born 1929, was educated here
- Jim Goodwin, football player and manager, was born here
- Lafcadio Hearn, writer, spent his childhood here
- Gordon MacWhinnie, businessman in Hong Kong, was born here
- George Morrison, documentary filmmaker, was born here
- Edward J. Phelan, civil servant, first Director-General of the International Labour Organisation, was born here
- Louise Richardson, political scientist, former Vice-Chancellor of Oxford University, was born here
- Derrick Williams, footballer for LA Galaxy, lived here when he was young and played for Tramore A. F.C.

== See also ==
- Celtworld
- List of towns and villages in Ireland
- List of RNLI stations
- Pickardstown ambush
- Surfing in Ireland
- Thalatta! Thalatta! (similar to Tramore's motto)
