= Double Tower =

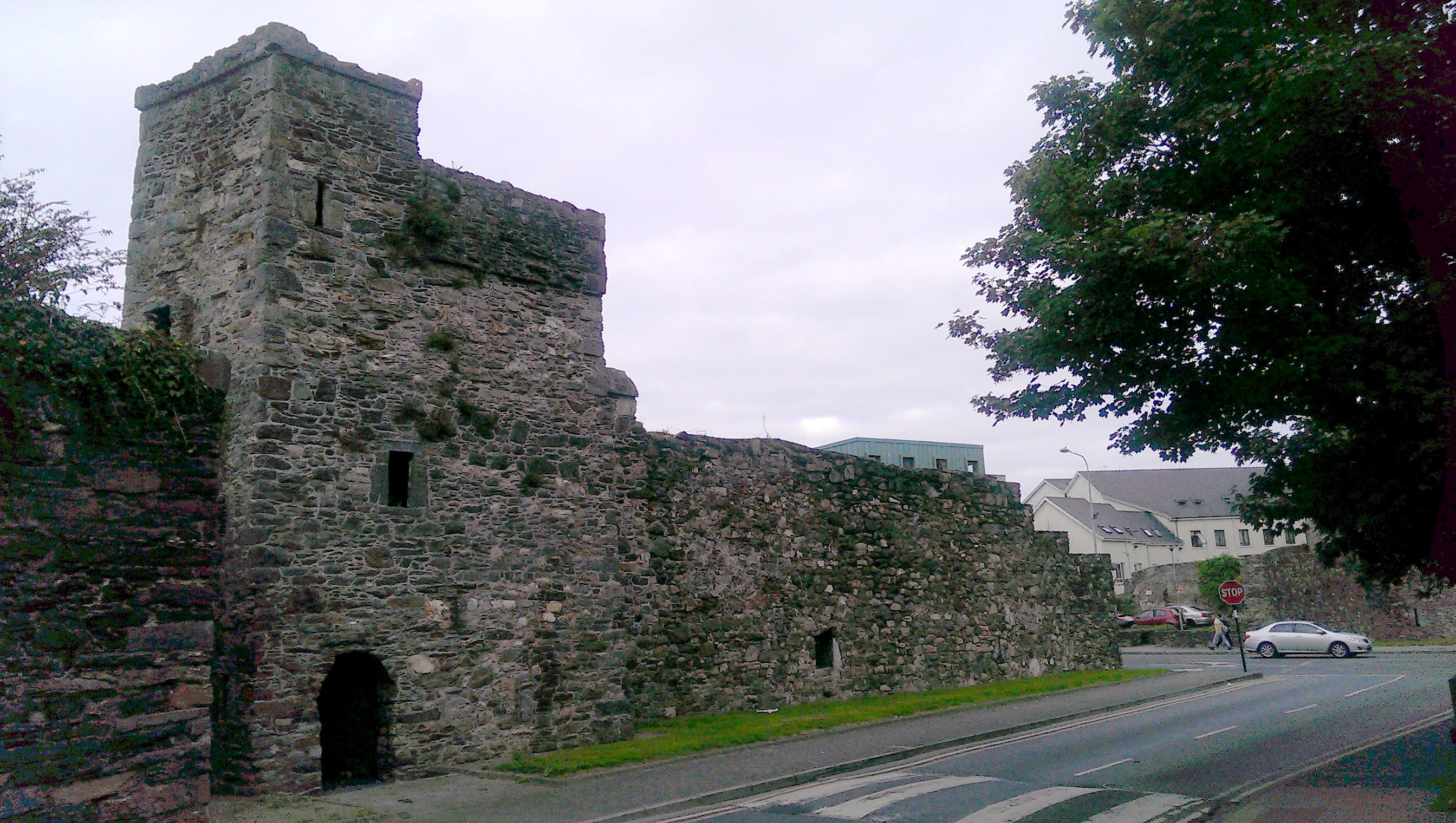
- The Double Tower in Waterford, Ireland

- Location within Ireland

General information
- Type: Fortified tower
- Location: Waterford, Ireland
- Coordinates: 52°15′22.56″N 7°6′44.9″W
- Construction started: 15th century
- Completed: 16th century

Height
- Height: 10.5 m (34 ft)

Technical details
- Material: Stone

National monument of Ireland
- Official name: Double Tower
- Reference no.: 671

The Double Tower is one of the 17 towers which were part of the city walls of Waterford, Munster, Ireland. It was built in the latter part of the 15th century and the early part of the 16th century. Six of the original 17 towers survive to this day; the other five being Reginald's Tower, Beach Tower, Semi-Lunar Tower, French Tower, and Watch Tower (Waterford). The Double Tower is located on Castle Street, between the French Tower and the Watch Tower. All three towers are well-preserved, along with some parts of the old city wall between them.

== Layout ==
The name Double Tower probably originates from the fact that there are two chambers inside it. One chamber contains a passageway which leads to the Benedictine Priory; the other, bigger chamber used to contain a flight of stairs leading to the upper floors and battlements. The Benedictine Priory was the priory of St. John and was owned by the Benedictine priory of St. Peter and Paul of Bath in England. Along with the citizens of Waterford, this priory funded the construction of the towers and walls in this part of the city.

The Double Tower is oblong in plan, measuring 7m in length in the northwest-southeast direction, and 4.5m in width. Its height is 10.5m. It looks like mini-tower house, joined at either end by the city wall. However, habitation was not the primary function of this building. The city wall at either end abuts onto the exterior of the tower. This indicates that the tower was built earlier, and was originally a freestanding structure.

During the Cromwellian siege of 1649, this tower and sections of the city wall were pounded with cannon fire. The tower was not built for this type of defence, so it required bolstering by half-filling with earth to take the impact of the cannon.

== City wall ==
Parts of the parapet in the section of the city wall to the southeast of the tower have survived to this day. However, at the northwest end, the original stepped crenellations can still be seen rising upwards to abut onto the tower. This feature is a rare survival on the Waterford city wall. The remains of an overhanging wall walk can still be seen running along the inside of the wall between the Double Tower and the Watch Tower. However, the battlement does not survive along the top of the city wall to the northwest of the Double Tower. The Double Tower was built as a freestanding structure on the remains of an earlier gateway. The two adjoining sections of the city wall at either end were built later. It is likely that the section of the wall to the northwest that runs downhill from the French Tower was built first, and then the wall running southeast that goes to the Watch Tower. All three towers are visible from Castle Street.

== See also ==
- List of National Monuments in County Waterford
- History of Waterford
