= Beach Tower, Waterford =

Beach Tower
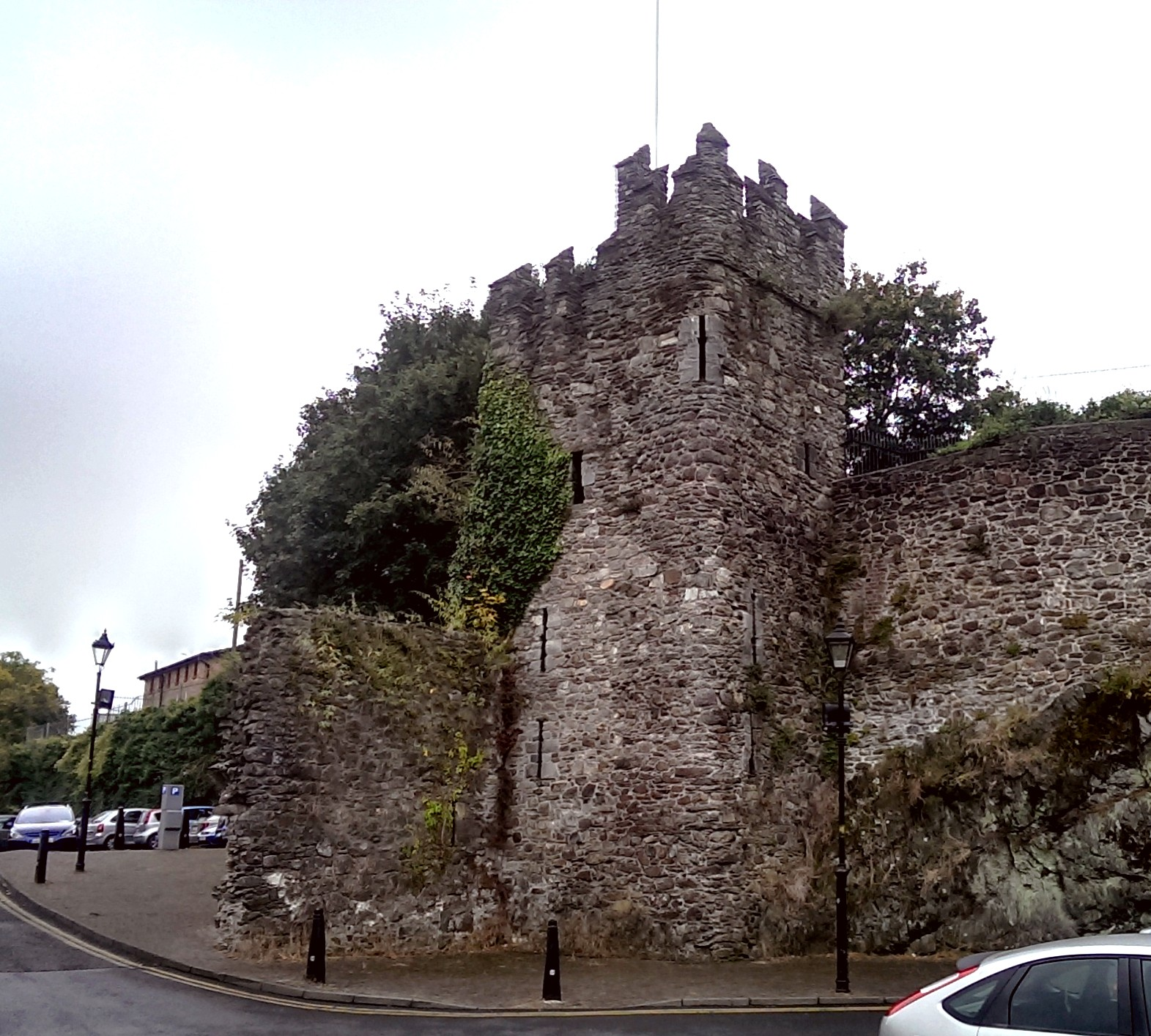
- The Beach Tower was part of the medieval defences of Waterford City in Ireland

- Location within Ireland

General information
- Type: Fortified tower
- Location: Waterford, Ireland
- Coordinates: 52°15′37.5″N 7°6′19.5″W
- Construction started: 15th century

Technical details
- Material: Stone

The Beach Tower located in Jenkins Lane car park, Waterford is a 15th century crenelated building which is part of the city defences. It was built on a rocky outcrop overlooking the River Suir and forms a natural defensive position.

As an observation post, the tower has uninterrupted views both upriver to Granagh Castle and downriver beyond Reginald's Tower. From the city's defensive point of view this was important as attacks from the river occurred occasionally and in particular the fear was of a Spanish landing. It also enabled the observers to keep an eye on the city docks from above.

The tower, which was substantially rebuilt during the early 17th century, was a bastion citadel. It had a rectangular shape with corner bastions which are typical of 17th century forts in Ireland.

== See also ==
- History of Waterford
