= Maothail =

Maothail, meaning 'soft/spongy ground' in gaelic languages, may refer to several places:

- Mohill, a small town in County Leitrim, Ireland
- Mothel, a village in County Waterford, Ireland
- Muthill, a village in Perthshire, Scotland
