= Ragnall Mac Gilla Muire =

12th century Irish leader

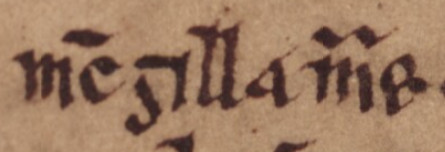
Ragnall's name as it appears on folio 25r of Oxford Bodleian Library Rawlinson B 488 (Annals of Tigernach): "Mac Gilla Muire".

Ragnall Mac Gilla Muire was a twelfth-century leading figure of Waterford. (Note: Since the 2000s, academics have accorded Ragnall various patronyms in English secondary sources: Ragnall Mac Gilla Muire, Ragnall Mac Gillamaire, and Ragnall mac Gillemaire.) He was one of several men taken prisoner by the English in 1170, when Waterford was captured by Richard de Clare. Ragnall is noted by a fourteenth-century legal enquiry which sought to determine whether a slain man was an Ostman—and thus entitled to English law—or an Irishman. Ragnall may the eponym of Reginald's Tower.

== English conquest of Waterford ==
Waterford was captured by the English in 1170. Probably in May of that year, an English advance party under Raymond le Gros and Hervey de Montemercy overcame the Waterfordians and their allies outside the town at Baginbun. The following August, Richard de Clare arrived on the scene, linked up with the English at Baginbun, stormed Waterford, and seized it. According to the twelfth-century Expugnatio Hibernica, a large number of the town's citizens were slaughtered in the streets, whilst Ragnall and several other leading defenders were captured in a tower called "turre Raghenaldi". Although two of these men—both named Sitric—are stated to have been executed, Ragnall and Máel Sechnaill Ua Fáeláin are said to have been spared on account of the intervention of Diarmait Mac Murchada.

Ragnall is noted as one of the principal Waterfordians by the twelfth- to thirteenth-century La Geste des Engleis en Yrlande. The fourteenth-century Annals of Tigernach, and the seventeenth-century Annals of the Four Masters, also note the fall of Waterford and the capture of Ragnall—described as "officer of the fortress"—and Máel Sechnaill. On 17 October 1171, Henry II, King of England made landfall in Ireland, probably at Crook, about five miles east of Waterford. The next day he and his forces entered the town, after which Richard formally surrendered it into the king's possession.

In 1311, Ragnall was noted by a legal enquiry headed by the Justiciar of Ireland, John Wogan. The case revolved around the murder of Eóin, son of Ímar Mac Gilla Muire, and sought to determine whether Eóin was an Ostman or Irishman. Although the defendant, one Robert le Waleys, admitted to killing Eóin, he pleaded that the act was not a felony because Eóin was an Irishman and not of free blood. The Crown, represented by John, son of John, son of Robert le Poer, argued that Eóin was instead an Ostman as a member of the Mac Gilla Muire family. As such, John argued that Eóin was entitled to protection under English law in Ireland on account of a charter issued by Henry—and later confirmed by Edward I, King of England—in which such protection was specifically granted to members of the family and other Ostmen. (Note: Only the confirmation charter of Edward was brought forth during the proceedings. In the first half of the ninth century, the Vikings established footholds in Ireland. Over time, some of these bases evolved into permanent settlements, such as the towns of Dublin, Limerick, and Waterford. Waterford itself was founded as an urban centre in the tenth century. The Scandinavian-Gaelic inhabitants of these towns were culturally distinct from the surrounding Irish. These differences are remarked upon by the twelfth-century Topographia Hibernica, which states that the inhabitants of Scandinavian-Gaelic towns were called Ostmen. This term is derived from a Germanic word meaning "easterners", apparently in reference to a belief that their ancestors came from the east.)

After the justiciary referred the case to a jury for more information, the jurors declared that Ragnall, a member of the said family, lived near the port of Waterford at "Renaudescastel", and unsuccessfully attempted to prevent Henry from landing at Waterford by laying three chains across the harbour entrance (from Renaudescastel on one side, to the land of Dunbrody in the liberty of Wexford on the opposite side). After the king landed, the juror's stated that Ragnall and some of his followers were captured, taken to Waterford, and hanged by the English. (Note: The outcome of the case is unknown.) The thirteenth-century Chronica of Roger de Hoveden partially contradicts the jurors' account, stating that Ragnall was one of the kings who submitted to Henry after his arrival at Waterford. Although Roger's account is the only source to record Ragnall's submission, it is unknown why such an act would have been recorded if it were not an historical fact. As one of the principal Waterfordians, Ragnall's submission could account for Henry's grant of protective rights to the Ostmen. (Note: Henry's charter is corroborated by later charter evidence.)

== Reginald's Tower ==
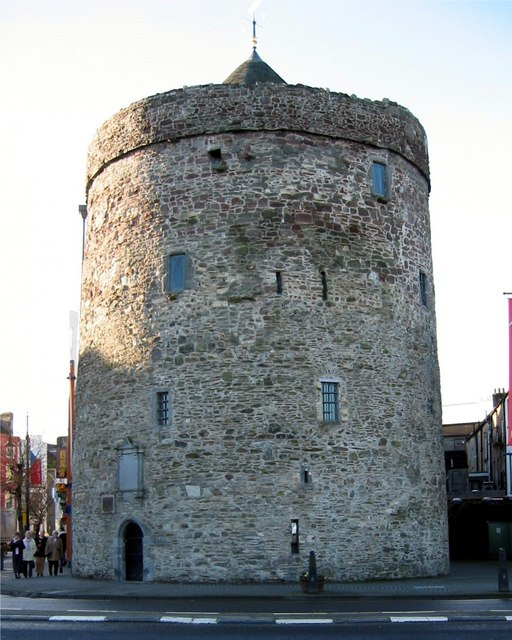
Ragnall may be the eponym of Reginald's Tower in Waterford.

It is possible that Ragnall, or one of several earlier like-named men who ruled Waterford, is the eponym of Reginald's Tower, a fifty-four foot high stone tower in Waterford. The present structure of Reginald's Tower may date to the thirteenth century, and it may occupy the site of an earlier fortress.

There is reason to suspect that Reginald's Tower may be identical to the tower in which Ragnall was captured. The juror's account of chains being laid from "Renaudescastel" to Dunbrody, however, may instead be evidence that the towers are not the same. If this account is based upon an historical fact, it could refer an attempt by the Waterfordians to block the English fleet further down river at Passage across from Dunbrody. In any case, the thirteenth-century Chronica of Roger de Hoveden specifically states that Henry landed at Crook, not far from Waterford and Passage. (Note: The account given by the Expugnatio Hibernica, and La Geste des Engleis en Yrlande, merely state that Richard arrived at Waterford.)

== See also ==
- Muiopotmos, the spider Aragnoll in Edmund Spenser's sixteenth-century Muiopotmos may be partially influenced by accounts of Ragnall.
