= Tramore Eco Group =

Irish voluntary non-profit organisation

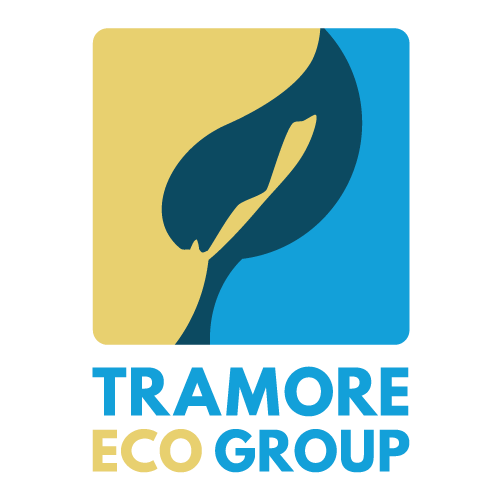
- Formation: 3 July 2017; 9 years ago
- Purpose: Environmentalism
- Location: Tramore, County Waterford, Ireland
- Coordinates: 52.1616°N 7.1507°W
- Region served: County Waterford
- Website: www.tramoreecogroup.ie

Tramore Eco Group (Irish: Grúpa Éice Trá Mhór) is a voluntary environmental protection group based in Tramore, County Waterford, Ireland, devoted to the conservation and protection of Tramore's ecological environment and wildlife habitats.

== Logo ==
The groups logo was designed by graphic designer Samuel Capper of Waterford Institute of Technology, after his leaf logo design was chosen through competition from several other entries. The midrib of the leaf shows the shape of the Tramore sand hills and sand spit, with the yellow and blue contrasting colours showing the land and sea aspect of Tramore. The logo was launched in early June 2018 at the Lafcadio Hearn Japanese Gardens, Tramore, which was attended by the Green Party and Ireland South MEP, Grace O'Sullivan.

== Partnerships ==
Tramore Eco Group have partnered with the Irish National Biodiversity Data Centre to further develop the All-Ireland Pollinator Plan in Tramore and to create pollinator friendly corridors in the town. The group is part of the Waterford Public Participation Network and Waterford Area Partnership and has hosted a number of community fairs in the area in association with other local community groups. The group often host informative wildlife talks and guided tours throughout County Waterford. They also organise beach cleans and ecological workshops between their members and wider community groups in Tramore and its environs. Moreover, the group participate in giving talks on the importance of reusing packaging for safe and sustainable wraps and gifting ideas.

== Initiatives ==
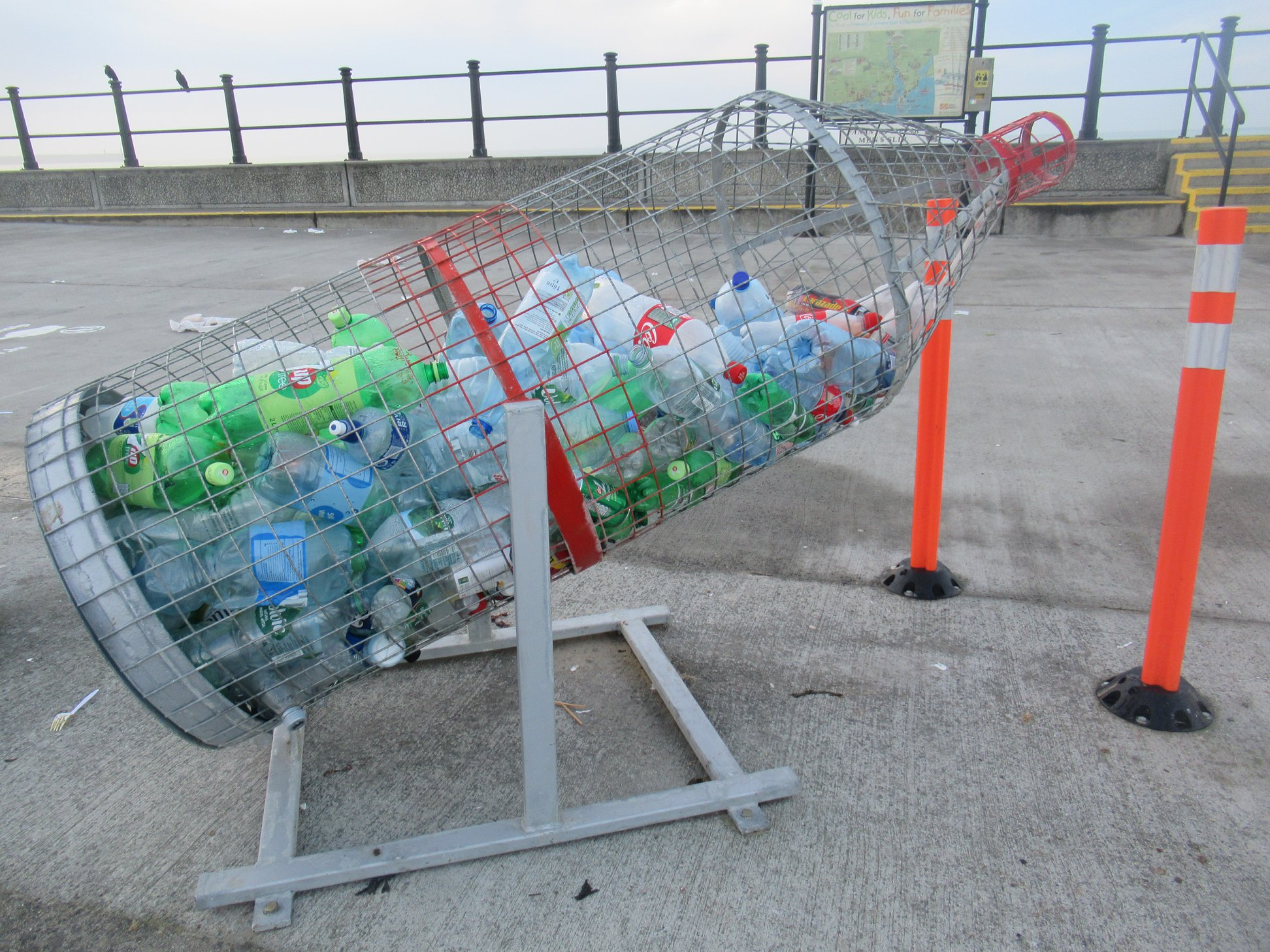
Plastic bottle shaped bin developed to encourage public recycling

The group have also worked with the local council in creating specially designed plastic bottle recycling bins, two of which have been added to the Promenade in Tramore aimed at encouraging the public to separate recyclable plastic from general waste.

Tramore Eco Group have also partnered with Refill Ireland in developing a plastic bottle water refilling initiative in the seaside town in collaboration with 100 local businesses who have committed to providing water bottle refills free of charge to the general public. The group aspire to become the first "Green" seaside town in Ireland and one of a number of initiatives undertaken, in conjunction with Waterford City and County Council, has been to extensively expand the biodiversity of the habitats in Tramore's back strand.

== Tramore Nature Park ==
Tramore Nature Park, locally known as Lark Park due to the settled population of Larks that inhabit the park, has been developed by Tramore Eco Group in conjunction with Waterford City and County Council in recent years. They developed ecological and wildlife features in Tramore Nature Park and plan to include a bird hide, bug hotels and twelve bee friendly flower beds. A number of signs have been erected around the park indicating the variety of wildlife present which can be seen in Tramore's back strand which is a Special Area of Conservation. The group have extended their bee corridor initiative in the park by planting a number of bee friendly plants and implementing bug hotels with the help of the local council. Indian Sandstone seating has been added throughout the park.

Tramore Eco Group have campaigned for a bird hide to be developed on Tramore Nature Park for many years and have run fundraiser campaigns to secure funds to allow the project to happen. The group also partnered with Glor Na Mara primary school who helped collect funds, before the COVID-19 pandemic in the Republic of Ireland, which went towards the construction of the bird hide in the park.

== The Banksy Project Tramore ==
The Banksy Project Tramore was a Graffito Art Competition set up by Tramore Eco Group to pay homage to Banksy. The event took place between 26 October 2019 and 28 October 2019 in Tramore Town. The thirty artists who were selected from applicants all over the country competed for a total prize pool of €7,000. The artists were tasked with creating an original ecologically themed piece on thirty walls around Tramore town over the period of six hours. A panel of judges selected the winners, with the overall winner receiving €3,000, second place receiving €2,000 and third place receiving €1,000. A further €1,000 prize was given to the winner of the popular vote, which the general public were able to vote on. The first prize winner of this competition was Kathrin Greif-Maher.

== Media coverage ==
The group have also received media coverage from Raidió Teilifís Éireann (RTÉ), the national public service media of Ireland, after one of their members captured rare footage of a wild otter feeding. Tramore Eco Group was then featured on Nationwide (Irish TV programme), where Bláthnaid Ní Chofaigh travelled to Tramore and spoke to the group about their success and future plans on maintaining and enhancing biodiversity in the area.

The group also gained a lot of media attention when one of their members discovered a 45 foot Baleen whale washed up on Kilfarrasy beach. The discovery was reported to the Irish Whale and Dolphin Group and follows on from a mass beaching of almost 400 whales which occurred in Australia at the same time. The remains of which had to be buried on public safety grounds as a result of the discovery. The group have also been documenting other mammals and wildlife which have washed up on local beaches in the area, including a common dolphin which had been found by one of the group's members.
