= Mary D. Cullen =

Irish women's movement activist

Mary Dolores Cullen
- Born: 1929 (age 96–97); Dublin, Ireland
- Education: University College Dublin
- Known for: Women’s Movement Activist

Mary Dolores Cullen (born 1929), was the first woman to become a member of the academic staff at Maynooth University and an Irish women's movement activist. She was the co-founder of the Women's History Association of Ireland.

== Early years and education ==
Cullen was born in Dublin in 1929. She got her education in Tramore, County Waterford and Cork city before going on to complete a master's degree in history in University College Dublin in 1952. Cullen became a tutor in St Catharine's College, Cambridge from 1956 to 1958 and returned to her alma mater from 1964 to 1967. She went from UCD to Maynooth University lecturing there until 1994. She was also a part time lecturer in Trinity College Dublin from 1992.

== Involvement with Irish women's movement ==
Cullen married and had children in the 1960s which was when Cullen discovered second wave feminism. It was during this time that she became a notable part of the Irish women's movement.

== Contributions to women's history ==
Cullen's work was important to ensuring women's history became accessible to the public. She has been influential in promoting feminism and women's history to more than three decades of students. Cullen has been referred to as a "philosopher of Irish and women's history."

Cullen co-founded, with Margaret MacCurtain, and worked as the original president of the Women's History Association of Ireland. She was awarded an honorary Doctorate by the National University of Ireland in 2011.

== Awards ==
Annually, The MacCurtain/Cullen Prize in Irishwomen's history is awarded in recognition of the outstanding contribution to Irish women's history.

== Bibliography ==
- Female Activists: Irish Women and Change 1900-1960
- Telling It Our Way: Essays in Gender History
- Exploration of the Responses of a Social Services Department to the Needs of Black Disabled Elders - SCA (Education) & University of Warwick Monograph S.
- Girls Don't Do Honours: Irish Women in Education in the 19th and 20th Centuries
- Women, Power and Consciousness: Women in 19th Century Ireland
- Female Activists: Irish Women and Change, 1900-1960
- ShoeShine Kids
- Women, Power and Consciousness in 19th Century Ireland: Eight Biographical Studies
