= Knockeen Portal Tomb =

Megalith in County Waterford, Ireland

Coordinates: 52.2056°N 7.2112°W

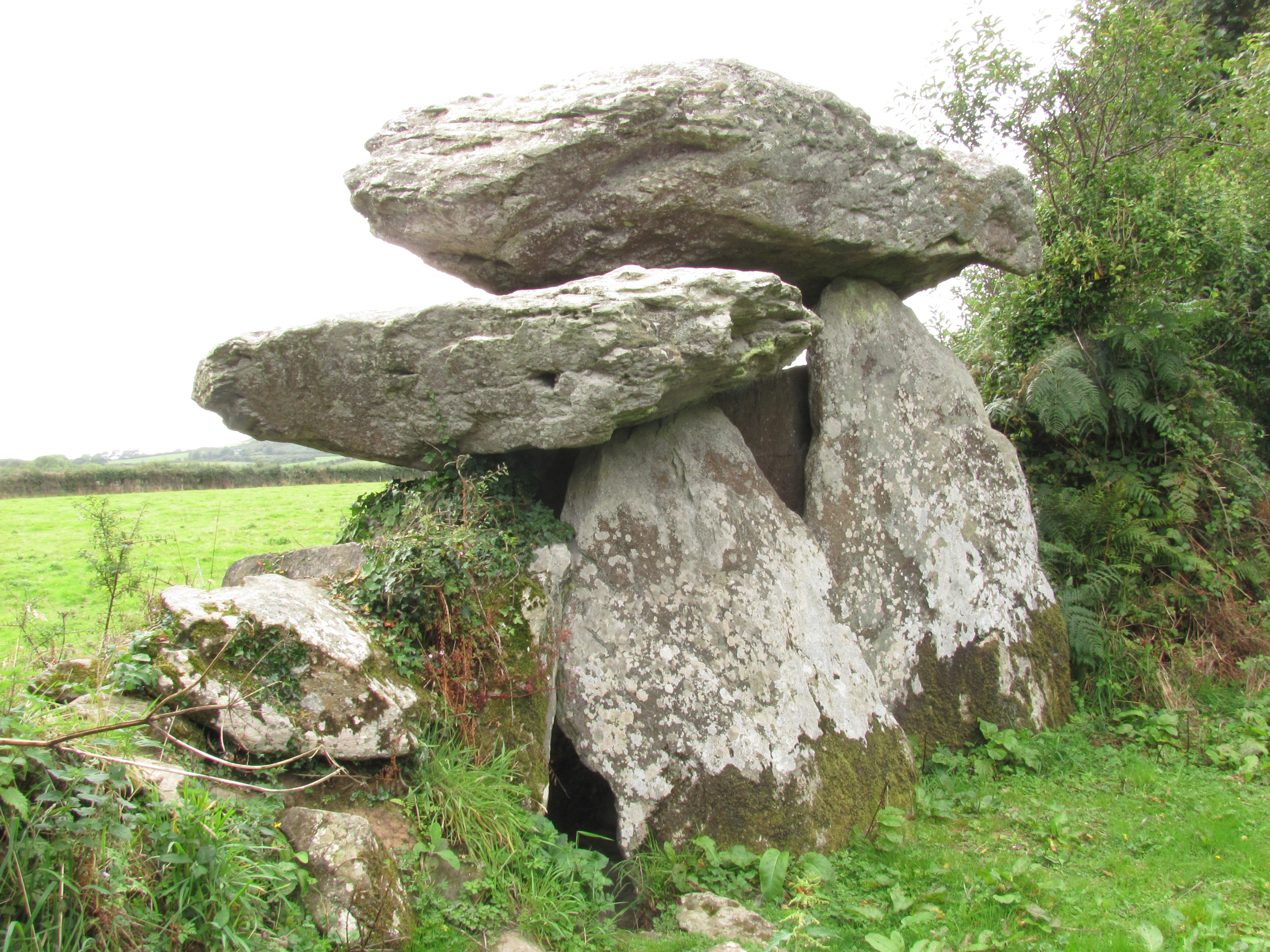
- Knockeen Dolmen as seen from the front

- Location in Ireland
- Type: Dolmen
- Periods: Neolithic
- Cultures: Celtic
- Location: County Waterford, Ireland

History
- Built: c. 2500 BC

Site notes
- Material: Stone
- Height: 3.5 m (11 ft)
- Width: 2.1 m (6 ft 11 in)
- Public access: Yes

National monument of Ireland
- Official name: Knockeen
- Reference no.: 421

The Knockeen Portal Tomb is a megalith in Knockeen, County Waterford, Ireland. It is the largest dolmen (portal tomb) in County Waterford exhibiting a double capstone configuration, though it is not the tallest standing stone structure. It is one of the finest examples of a dolmen in Ireland.

== Description ==
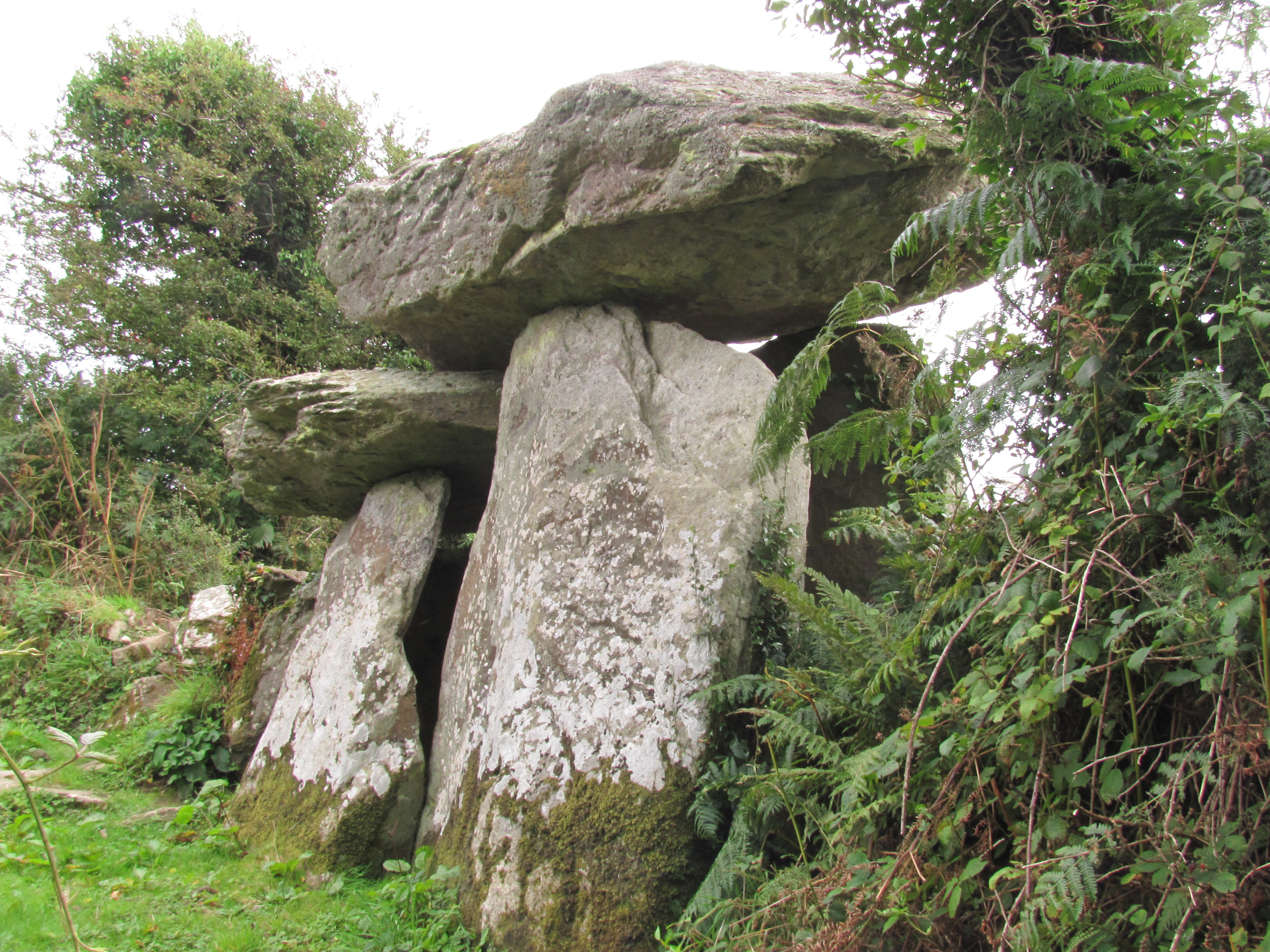
The individual stones of Knockeen measure up to 2.8 metres (9 ft 2 in) in height

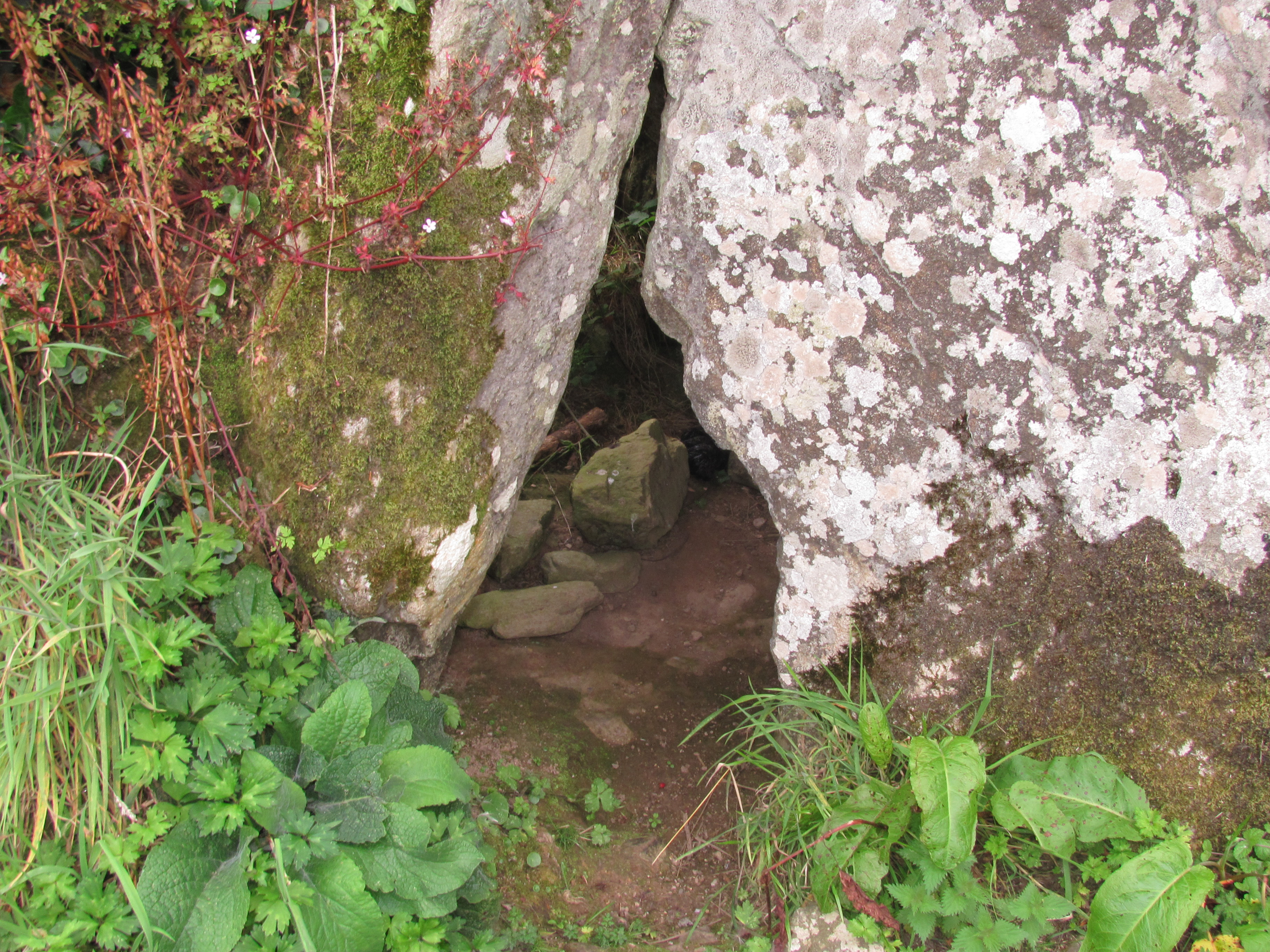
The keyhole entrance

The Knockeen Portal Tomb has five large uprights and two capstones in total. There is a doorstone to the structure with straight faces that does not bear any of the overall weight. It is, however, similar in size to the other four standing stones. The monument measures 3.5 metres (11 ft) high and 2.1 metres (6 ft 11 in) wide. The orthostats (upright stones) measure up to 2.8 metres (9 ft 2 in) in height around a tightly closed interior chamber. The capstones lie at a nearly horizontal angle.

The interior chamber is accessed by a keyhole entrance at ground level, 80 centimetres (31 in) in width, which may suggest spiritual offerings were placed inside the structure in ancient times. The front face and keyhole entrance face northwest under a porch-like structure formed by the lower capstone. An up-growth of vines and other plants rises over the base of the doorstone at the front, and encloses the rear of the structure.

== Use ==
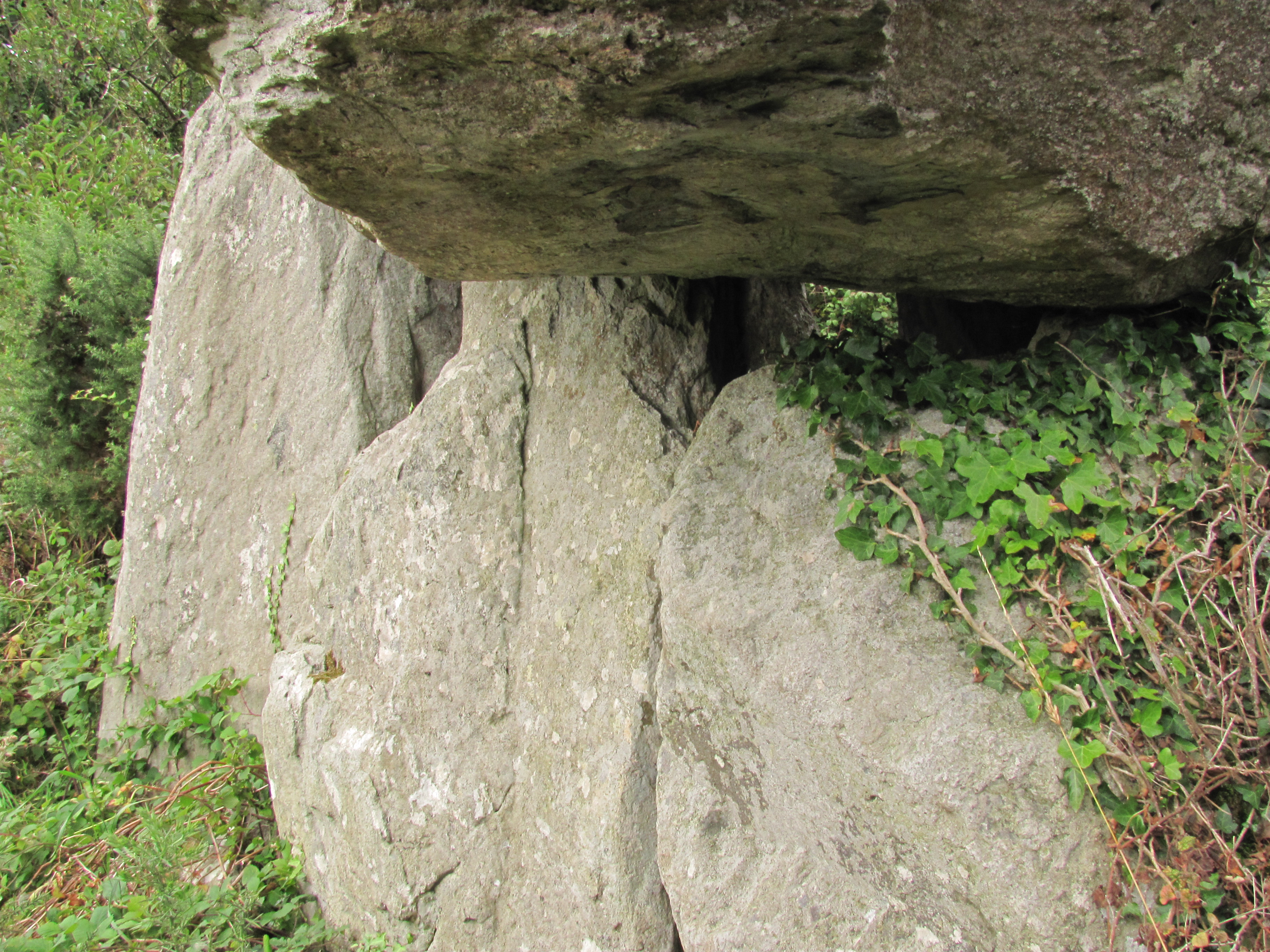
Vines grow over the doorstone

It is unclear exactly what the tomb was used for. It could have been the burial site of a Déisi chieftain from the nearby area, or it could have served a spiritual purpose. It has been noted that the entrance of the tomb aligns with the Sugarloaf hill to the northwest. This gives rise to the possibility of solar and lunar alignments during summer solstice and full moon cycles of the start and middle of the year. The site could also have been employed by local shamans or druids for various spiritual rituals.

Knockeen Portal Tomb is under state care as it is a listed national monument, number 421. The monument was once part of the cemetery of Kilbride Church, circa 18th century (now located in ruins in the northerly field), which has been reconstituted as pasture for cattle. As a result, electrical fencing runs less than a meter from the edge of the structure.

Knockeen Dolmen is part of "The Dolmen Drive" tourist trail and is accessed by climbing a gate, crossing a field, and navigating an electric fence.

== See also ==
- List of megalithic monuments in Ireland
