= Östman =

Östman is a Swedish-language surname. Notable people with the surname include:

- Albert Ostman (1893–1975), Swedish-Canadian prospector and purported Sasquatch abductee
- Arnold Östman (1939–2023), Swedish conductor and music director
- Bror Östman (1928–1992), Swedish ski jumper
- Peter Östman (born 1961), Swedish politician
