= Drumlohan Souterrain and Ogham Stones =

Drumlohan souterrain and ogham stones
- Uaimh agus Clochanna Oghaim Dhrom Lócháin (Irish)
- The Ogham Cave
- Location within Ireland
- 52.162846°N 7.464882°W
- Type: Souterrain and ogham stones
- Location: Drumlohan, Stradbally, County Waterford, Ireland

History
- Built: AD 400–700 (ogham stones); AD 800–900 (souterrain)

Site notes
- Elevation: 84 m (276 ft)
- Owner: private

National monument of Ireland
- Official name: Drumlohan
- Reference no.: 154

Drumlohan souterrain and ogham stones, known locally as the Ogham Cave, is a souterrain with ogham stones forming a National Monument located in County Waterford, Ireland.

== Location ==
Drumlohan souterrain and ogham stones are located in farmland 4 km (2½ mi) east of Lemybrien.

== History ==
The ten ogham stones were carved between 400 and 700 AD.

The souterrain is believed to have been constructed around the 9th century AD and is aligned WSW, facing the setting sun. Souterrains were storage sites and places of refuge.

In July/August 1867 a local farmer rediscovered the souterrain and ogham stones. In 1936 part of the souterrain was dismantled and some of the ogham stones re-erected above ground.

== Description ==
=== Souterrain ===
This souterrain gallery is about 4.9 m (16 ft) long and 1.3 m (4 ft) wide, with a roof height of up to 1.2 m (4 ft). It is constructed of orthostats roofed with lintels, and ten ogham stones were used as lintels and sidestones (some of them being installed upside-down). One of the roofstones bears cup marks.

=== Ogham stones ===
The stones (CIIC 272–281) vary in size. All are greenschist, except for two of slate and one of conglomerate. The inscriptions are:

- MANU MAGUNO GATI MOCOI MACORBO (of Manu the boy of Gáeth, of the tribe of Macorbo) — perhaps the Dál Maic-Cuirp, one of the Déisi Muman
- CALUNOVIC[A] MAQI MUCOI LIT[EN]Ị (of Culann, son of the tribe of Litenos)
- MAQI-INI ̣ ̣ ? ̣ ̣ MAQI(?) QE(?)]TTEAS (of Maqinni, son of Qetteas)
- CUNALEGEA MAQI C[ ... ]SALAR CELI AVI QVECI (of Conlaoi son of C ... salar, follower of the grandson of Cuach)
- BIGU MAQI LAG ... (of Bigu, son of Lag ... )
- BIR MAQI MUCOI ROTTAIS (of Bir, son of the tribe of Rottis) — referring to the Rothrige, a subject tribe of the Déisí
- [ ... ] MAQI NE[TACUN]AS ( ... son of Netacunas). The name Netacunas means "Hound's champion."
- DENAVEC[A MU]COI MEDALO (of Denaveca of the tribe of Medalo) — maybe the Dál Mo Dala
- BRO[INION]AS (of Broinionas)
- DEAGOS MAQI MUCO[I ... NAI (of Deagos, son of the tribe of I ... nai)

=== Nearby Ogham Stones ===
This area of Waterford has several other nearby sites with Ogham Stones: North east of Stradbally is Toberkillea with two Ogham Stones, nearby is Island Ringfort which has a Bullaun and a fallen Ogham Stone, north east of Dungarvan is Garranmillon with two Ogham Stones, north west of Dungarvan is St. Seskinan's church at Knockboy with multiple Ogham Stones and Kilcomeragh near Lemybrien with one Ogham Stone.
