= List of kings of Waterford =

This is a list of kings of Waterford.

== Kings of Viking Waterford (914–1170) ==
The Vikings, who had created a longphort near Waterford in 853, finally settled and created a town in 914. These were led by Ottir Iarla. Ragnall ua Ímair then installed himself over them in 917, however leaving a year later for Britain, with Ottir, and presumably placing a deputy in control. Several of the 11th-century Norse kings, the descendants of Ímar (died 1000), were both allied to and vassals of the powerful O'Brien dynasty, with whom they may also have intermarried, and who in at least one case in the 1070s (Diarmait, son of Toirrdelbach Ua Briain) exercised direct rule over the small city.

- Ottir Iarla (914–917)
- Ragnall ua Ímair (917-920/1)
- Ímar (died 1000)
- Ragnall mac Ímair (died 1018)
- Sitriuc mac Ímair (died 1022)
- Ragnall ua Ímair (reigned 1022–1035)
- Cú Inmain ua Robann (died 1037)
- Wadter (?-?)
- Ragnall Mac Gilla Muire (?-1170)
- O'Faoláin (?-1170)

The fate of the Waterford Norse is uncertain after the Norman invasion. Forced out of their own city, they are recorded occupying some of the surrounding countryside for a period afterwards. Also uncertain is how long the Uí Ímair continued to provide rulers.

== Early Cambro-Norman rulers (1170–1284) ==
This is a list of rulers of Waterford, nominal or otherwise, from the early Cambro-Norman period until the succession of mayors. While the first known charter was issued in 1205 by King John of England, the city had been declared to be a royal city by King Henry II of England in 1171. It is known that Waterford had a Provost in 1195, so certainly there was a civil administration prior to the establishment of the mayoralty. Source for information in this section:.

- Richard de Clare, 2nd Earl of Pembroke (Strongbow) (1170)
- Raymond le Gros (aka Raymond Fitzgerald) (1170)
- King Henry II of England (1171)

== See also ==
- List of mayors of Waterford
