= Mothel Abbey =

Ruined monastery located in County Waterford, Ireland

- Mainistir Mhaothla
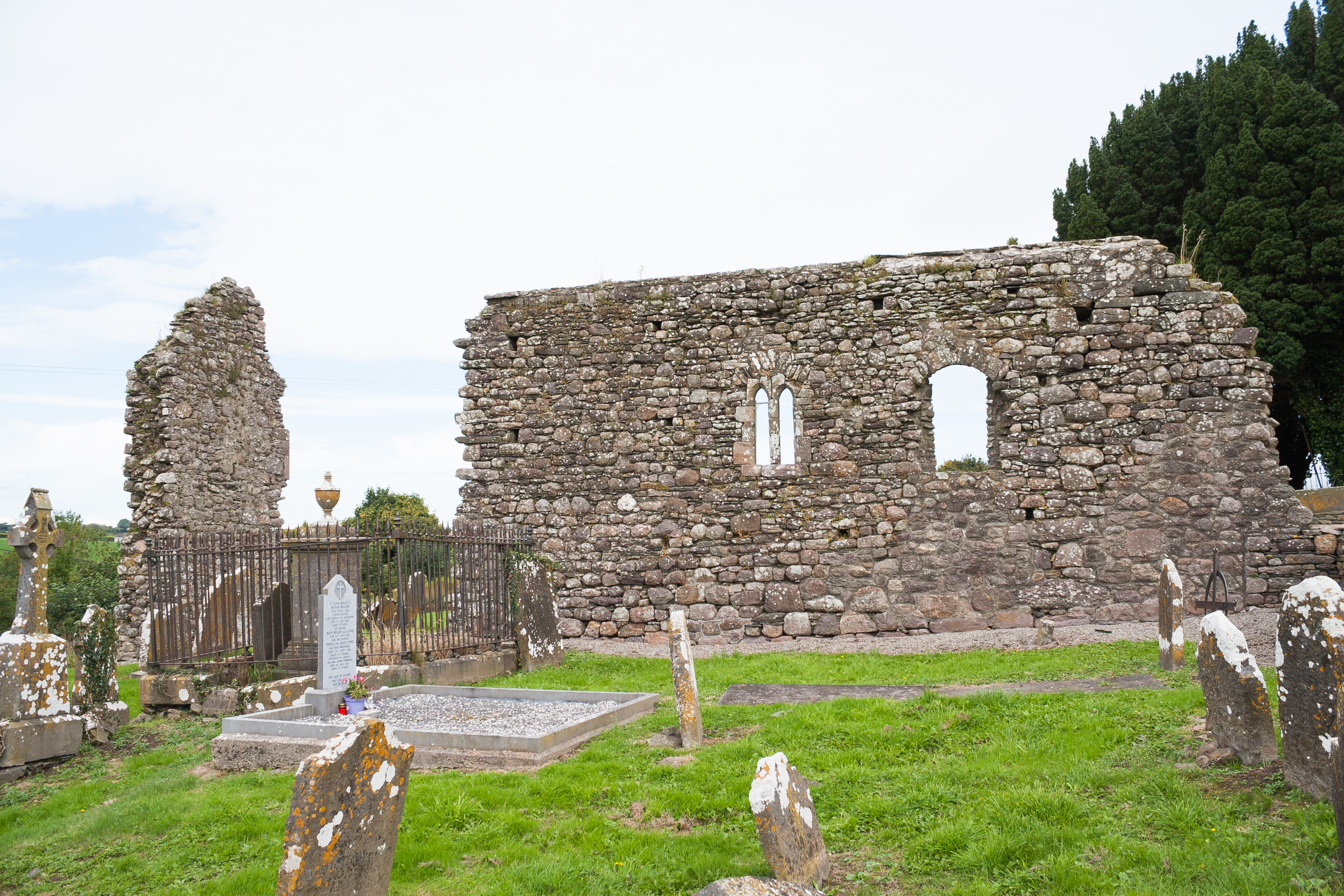

- Location within Ireland
- Interactive map of Mothel Abbey

Monastery information
- Other names: Maothail; Motalia; Mothil; Maothail Braocáin
- Order: Augustinians; Cistercians
- Established: 6th century AD
- Disestablished: 1540
- Diocese: Waterford and Lismore

People
- Founder: Broccán Clóen

Architecture
- Status: Inactive

Site
- Location: Mothel, County Waterford
- Coordinates: 52.298456°N 7.418558°W
- Public access: Yes

Mothel Abbey is a former Augustinian monastery and National Monument located in County Waterford, Ireland.

== Location ==
Mothel Abbey is located in Mothel village, 5.4 km (3.4 mi) south of Carrick-on-Suir.

== History ==
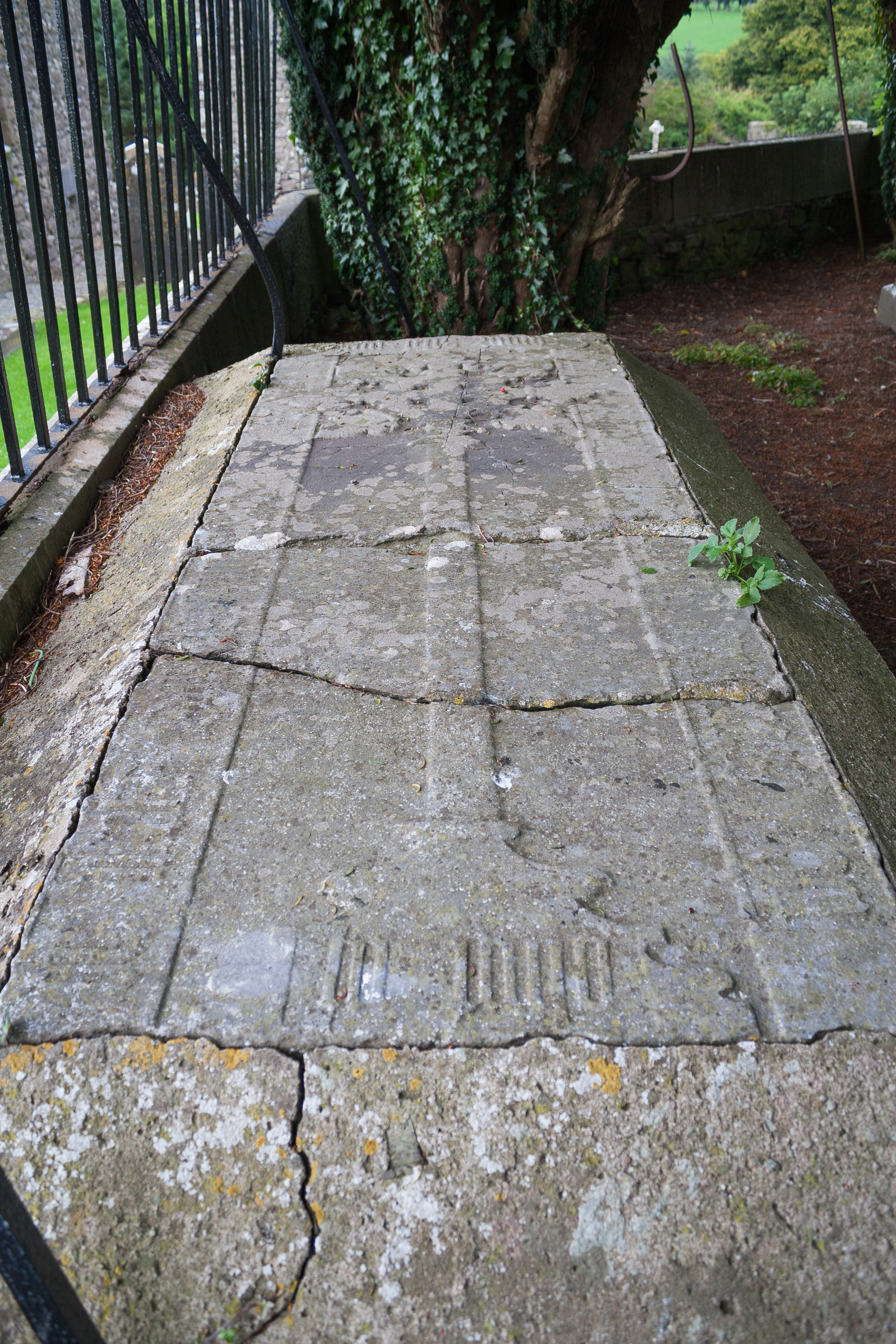
Graveslab of Richard Power, d. 1483.

Mothel was an early monastic site, founded in the 6th century either by Broccán Clóen (Brogan, feast day 8 July) or, according to the Martyrology of Donegal, St. Brogan Scribe. Cúan succeeded Brogan.

It was refounded by the Augustinian Canons Regular after 1140, and they controlled a large region of central County Waterford. The remaining buildings date to the 13th century, and a tomb from c. 1500.

The last abbot, Edmund Power, surrendered the abbey on 7 April 1540 as part of the Dissolution of the Monasteries.

For a limited time period in the first half of the 17th century, the Cistercian abbot Thomas Madan occupied Mothel, wrongly assuming that Mothel is a Cistercian foundation. This led to a prolonged conflict with Patrick Comerford, bishop of Waterford and Lismore and Vicar General of the Order of Canons Regular of St. Augustine, who eventually convinced Madan before his death in 1645.

=== Known abbots ===
- to 1463: Thady O'Morrissey
- 1463: Donald O'Byrne / Donaldus Obreyn / Domhnall Ó Briain
- to 1540: Edmund Power

== Remains ==
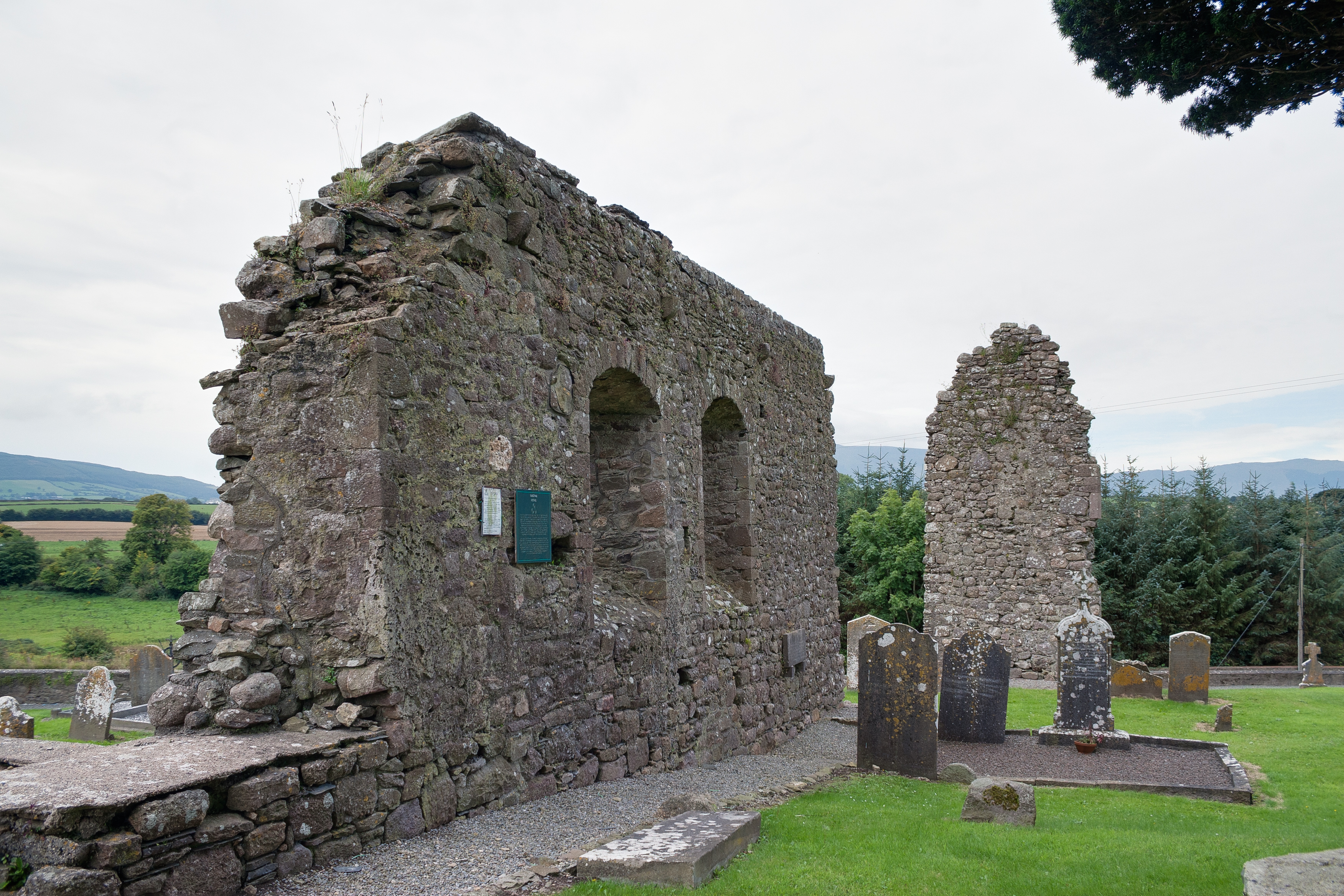
Nave of church

The remains are the church are part of the south wall of the monastic church, a portion of a gable (minus door or window), and part of what may have been the south transept. In the surviving south wall are two windows, one completely disfigured, the other consisting of two plain Gothic lights separated by a limestone mullion, and the arches formed of two stones each. Internally the dressings are of sandstone.
