= Mothel =

Village in County Waterford, Ireland

Mothel Maothail
- Village
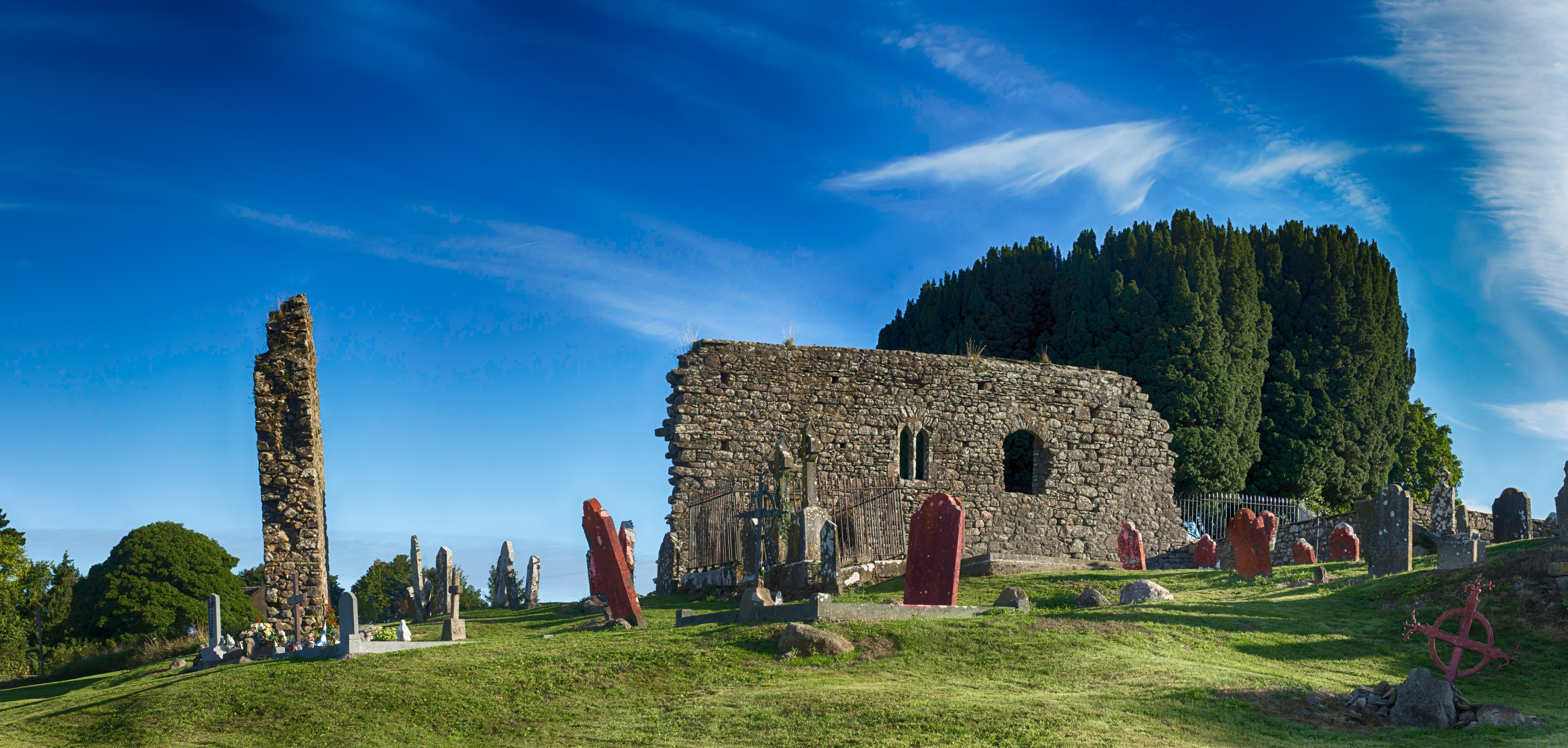
- Mothel Abbey

- Location in Ireland
- Coordinates: 52°17′57″N 7°25′10″W
- Country: Ireland
- Province: Munster
- County: County Waterford
- Time zone: UTC+0 (WET)
  - Summer (DST): UTC-1 (IST (WEST))

Mothel (Irish: Maothail, meaning 'spongy land') is a small village, civil parish and townland, near the Comeragh Mountains in the northern part of County Waterford, Ireland. The nearest town is Carrick-on-Suir, 5 km to the north. Waterford city is 20 km to the east.

== Heritage ==
Mothel Abbey was founded in the 6th century by a St. Breoghan. It was refounded for the Augustinians by the Power family in the 13th century. It was closely associated with Molana Abbey and St. Catherine's Abbey in Waterford.

A Cross Pillar stone, also known as a termon-stone, stands by the roadside in Mothel. The squared sandstone pillar stands four feet high and is inscribed with ornamental crosses.

Traditionally, local people walk through the stream at Mothel holy well seven times on the local Pattern day, known as Lá Chuain Airbhre.

== Sport ==
Cyclist Sean Kelly grew up in the townland of Curraghduff, approximately 1 km from Mothel.

== See also ==
- List of towns and villages in Ireland
