= Gaulstown Portal Tomb =

Megalithic tomb in County Waterford, Ireland

- Tuama ursanach Chnoc an Ghallaigh
- The portal tomb in 2026

- Location within Ireland
- 52.2056°N 7.2112°W
- Type: Portal tomb
- Periods: Neolithic
- Cultures: Celtic
- Location: Gaulstown, County Waterford, Ireland

History
- Built: c. 3500 BC

Site notes
- Public access: Yes

National monument of Ireland
- Official name: Gaulstown
- Reference no.: 398

The Gaulstown Portal Tomb or Gaulstown Dolmen is a megalithic portal tomb situated in Gaulstown, Butlerstown in County Waterford, Ireland. It lies about 7 km (4.3 mi) south west of Waterford City.

== Location ==
Office of Public Works national monument notice at the site entrance, in Irish and English

Bilingual heritage signpost directing visitors to the dolmen

The tomb is named for the townland in which it situated, Gaulstown, and sits at the foot of "Cnoc an Chaillighe" or "The Hill of the Hag". Gaulstown townland lies in the civil parish of Lisnakill, in the barony of Middlethird. In 1866, the geologist George Du Noyer described the tomb as standing on the northern flank of Carrick-a-roirk Hill, a name he translated as "the Rock of the Prospect".

== Features ==
The portal tomb most likely dates from around 3500 BC, and is considered one of the finest examples of portal tombs in the region, and was first recorded by George Du Noyer who sketched the tomb in July 1863, and published a description, plan and view of it, which he termed a "cromleac", in 1866.

The tomb faces south east into the hillside, and consists of two east-facing portal stones which are 2.4 metres (7 ft 10 in) high, with a door stone between and a chamber consisting of three other upright stones. All of these support a rectangular capstone, which is 4.2 metres (14 ft) in length, and 1 metre (3 ft 3 in) deep. Du Noyer recorded the capstone as 12 by 7 feet (3.7 by 2.1 m), with an average thickness of 1 foot (0.30 m) and an estimated weight of about three tons. He recorded the inner chamber as 7 feet (2.1 m) long, 6 feet 4 inches (1.93 m) at its widest and 7 feet (2.1 m) high, and noted that the stones had been taken from the local trappean rock.

The archaeologist T. G. E. Powell classified Gaulstown as a portal chamber, noting the large size of its portal stones, which project forward on either side of the closing slab. He counted it among the most important tombs in east Waterford. The tomb has been undergone maintenance in the past, with a concrete support added inside the chamber. There is evidence that some of the upright stones may have moved over time, as the shape of the chamber has been impacted.

It is likely that the structure was once enclosed by a mound or cairn, which has since been removed or eroded away. Du Noyer also recorded a cist 31 feet (9.4 m) north-west of the tomb, built into the ground and measuring about 16 to 17 feet (4.9 to 5.2 m) long. One of its three covering slabs remained in place.

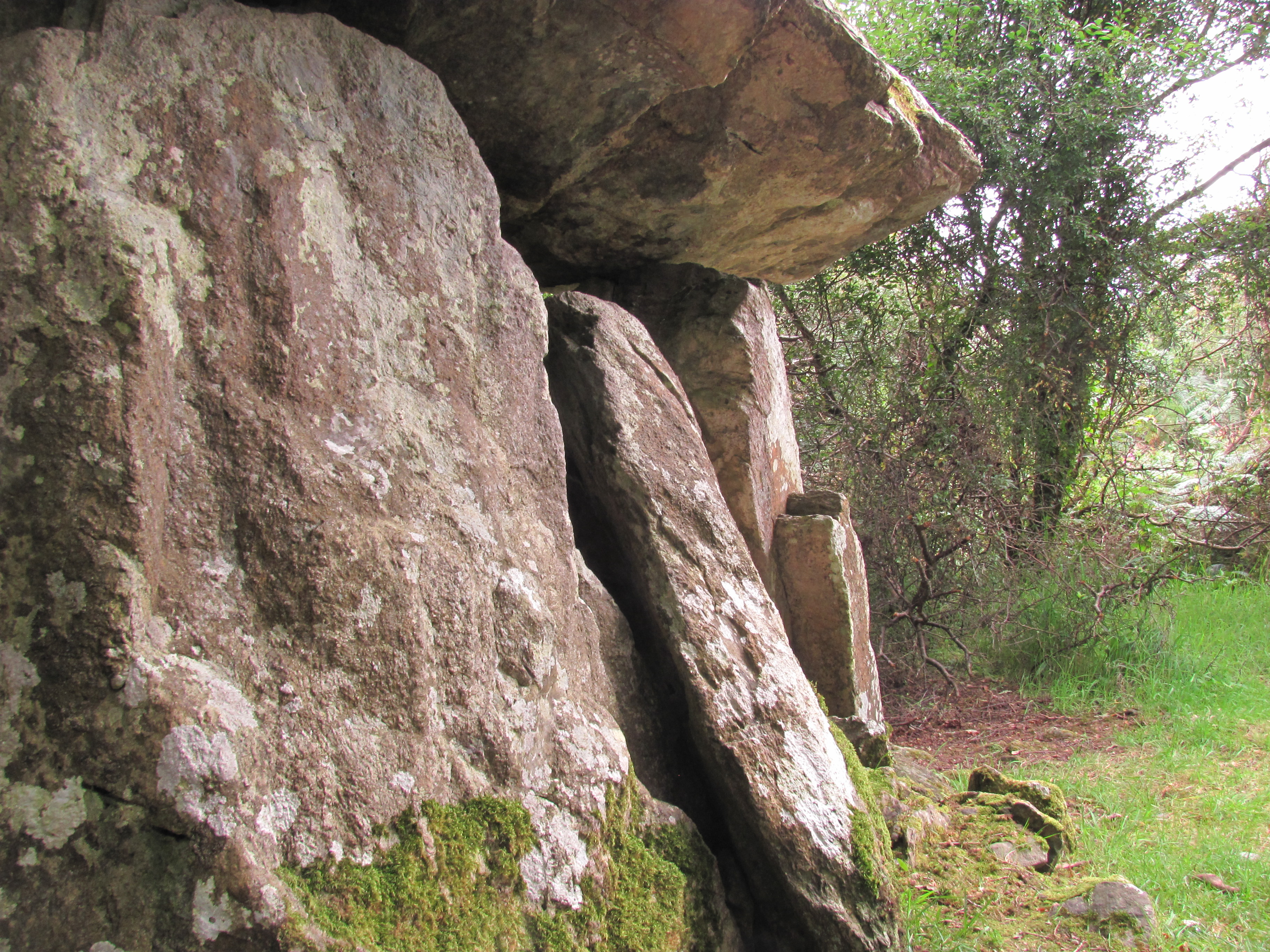
Gaulstown Dolmen IMG 4686

== See also ==
- List of largest monoliths in the world
- Dolmen
- Irish megalithic tombs
- National Monument of Ireland
- Office of Public Works (OPW)
