= History of Waterford =

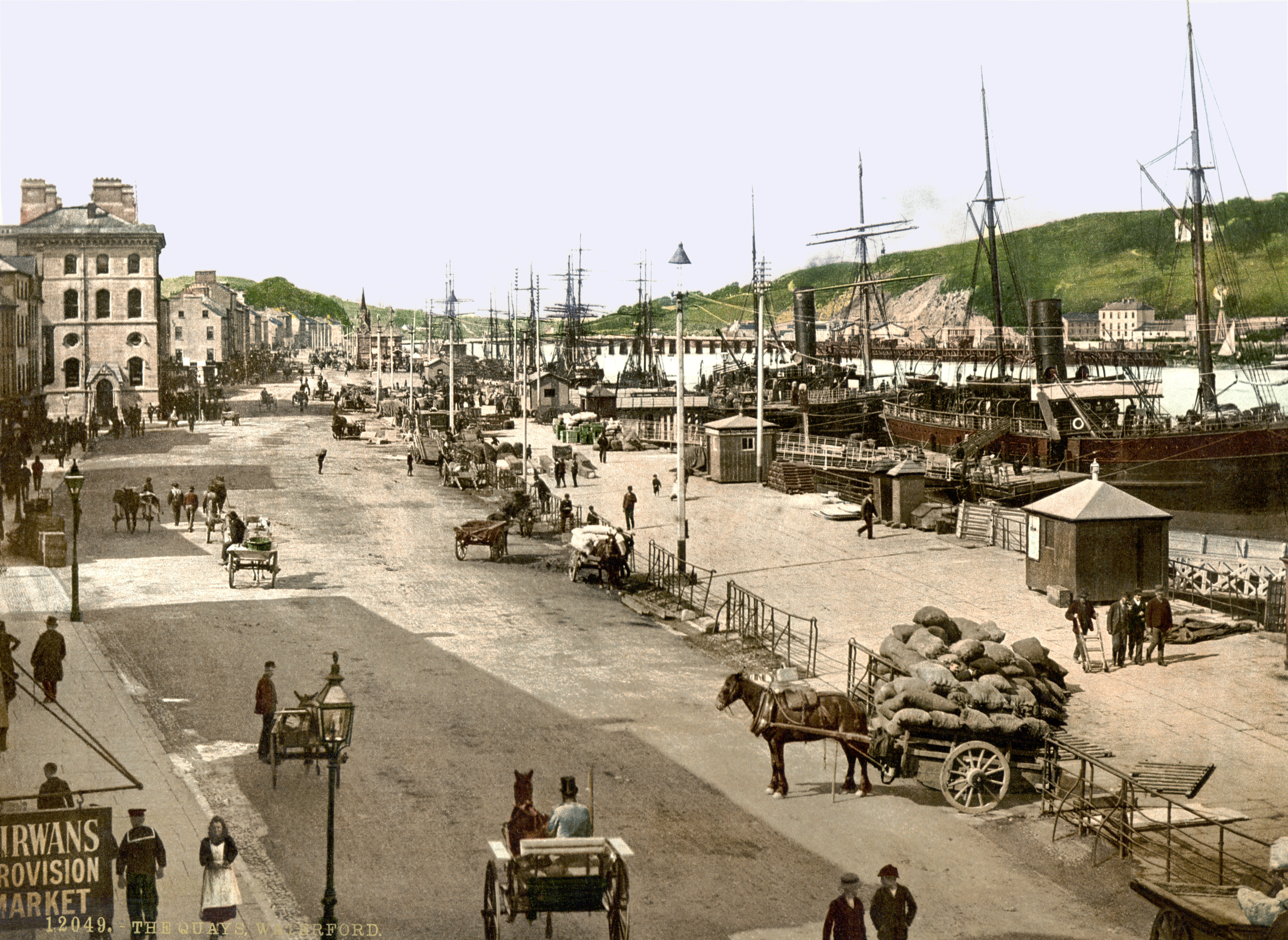
The quay at Waterford c. 1890–1900

Waterford city is situated in south eastern Ireland, on the river Suir [pronounced Shure] about seventeen miles (27 km) from where the river enters the sea.

Waterford is Ireland's oldest city and is thought to have been founded by Vikings in the 9th century. It was taken over by Anglo-Norman invaders in the 12th century, and was one of the most important Old English centres in medieval Ireland. Since then it has seen sieges, invasions, famine and economic highs and lows. It remains the largest city in Ireland's south-east.

See Rulers of Waterford for a list of the city's rulers from 914 onwards.

== Foundation ==
There are references to Vikings living in the Waterford area in the years 860, 892 and 914, and the foundation of Waterford is generally dated to 914. A popular story of Waterford's origins tells that it was established by a Viking-chieftain named Sitric in 853. This account is based on an account by Gerald of Wales, and is challenged by Clare Downham in her article The historical importance of Viking-Age Waterford. An alternative origin myth is found in the 13th-century Ystoria Gruffudd ap Cynan – in which the Norwegian king Harald Finehair (c. 850 – c. 933) is said to have founded Dublin, and to have given Waterford to his brother.

Among the most prominent Kings of Waterford was Ivar of Waterford (d. 1000).

During the late 10th and early 11th centuries, the rise of Brian Bóruma saw Waterford and a number of other Viking ports being brought firmly under the control of the O'Brien dynasty. Control of these Viking ports was significant for would-be Irish High Kings as it granted greater access to international trade and manpower.

== Anglo Norman invasion and medieval period ==
In 1137, Diarmuid MacMorrough, king of Leinster, failed in an attempt to take Waterford. He was trying to secure the large centres to advance his claim for high king of Ireland. In 1170 MacMorrough allied himself with Richard de Clare, 2nd Earl of Pembroke (Strongbow); together they besieged and took Waterford after a desperate defence. This was the introduction of the Anglo-Normans into Ireland. In 1171, Henry II of England became the first English king to set foot in an Irish city, by landing with a large fleet at Waterford; he did so to ensure that Ireland became an English colony and not a rival Norman country. Waterford and Dublin were declared royal cities, and belonged to the king, not Strongbow; Dublin was declared capital of Ireland.

Throughout the medieval period, Waterford was Ireland's second city after Dublin. Waterford's great parchment book (1361–1649) represents the earliest use of the English language in Ireland for official purposes.

== Religious war and upheavals ==
Waterford was occupied by Mountjoy in 1603 during the Nine Years War (Ireland) a rebellion led by Hugh O'Neill, ostensibly in the cause of Irish independence and the Catholic religion. Despite their own adherence to Catholicism, the townspeople largely sided with the English government forces. However, upon the coronation of James VI of Scotland as king of England in 1603, the citizens participated in an uprising that was common to the coastal cities of Munster and refused entry to Mountjoy, the king's Lord Deputy of Ireland, who had just secured the surrender of Hugh O'Neill. The motivation for Waterford's defiance lay in the people's demand for freedom of religion – they were led by Catholic priests and re-consecrated several churches in the city – although there were also mutterings about the nationality of the new king. After negotiations, Lord Mountjoy was granted entry to the city and the citizens pledged their loyalty anew.

However, Waterford's Roman Catholic population became deeply alienated from the English Protestant state in Ireland in the following 40 years. After the Irish Rebellion of 1641, Waterford was a centre of support for the Confederate Catholics of Ireland – a de facto independent Irish state formed to fight for Irish Catholic interests in the Irish Confederate Wars. Within the Confederation, Waterford was known for its militant Catholic politics – rejecting an alliance signed between the Confederates and Charles I that would have sent Irish troops to fight for the King in the English Civil War.

== 18th and 19th century ==
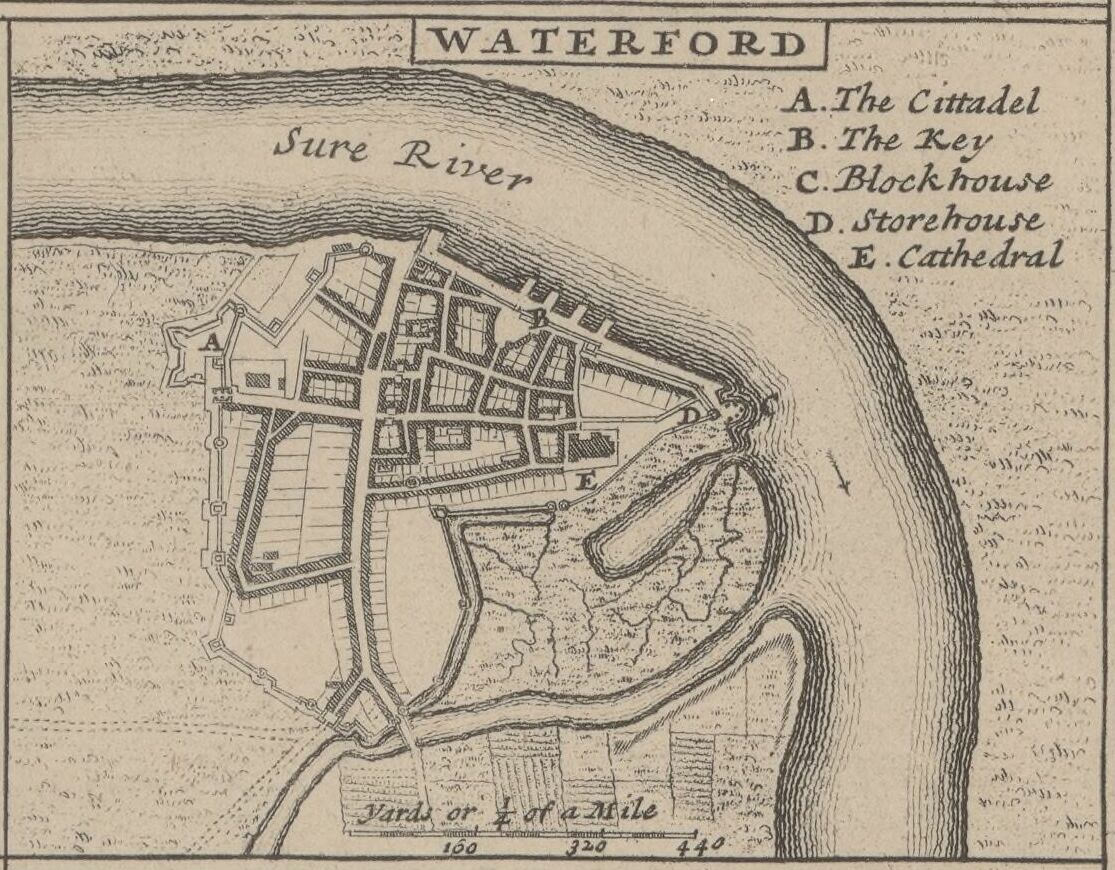
Herman Moll's map of Waterford in the early 18th century

The 18th century was a period of huge prosperity for Waterford. Most of the city's best architecture appeared during this time. Trading with Newfoundland brought much wealth into what was then the third largest port in Ireland.

In 1783, George and William Penrose founded a glass factory, which would become Waterford Crystal, the most famous business in the city.

A permanent military presence was established in the city with the completion of the Cavalry Barracks at the end of the 18th century.

In the 19th century, industries such as glass making and ship building thrived in the city. Thomas Francis Meagher (Meagher of the sword), an Irish nationalist, made the first Irish tricolour. He brought it back from France and it was first flown from a building on the Mall in Waterford.

== 20th century ==
In the early 20th century John Redmond was MP for Waterford and leader of the Irish Parliamentary Party, which almost achieved home rule and a new parliament for Ireland.

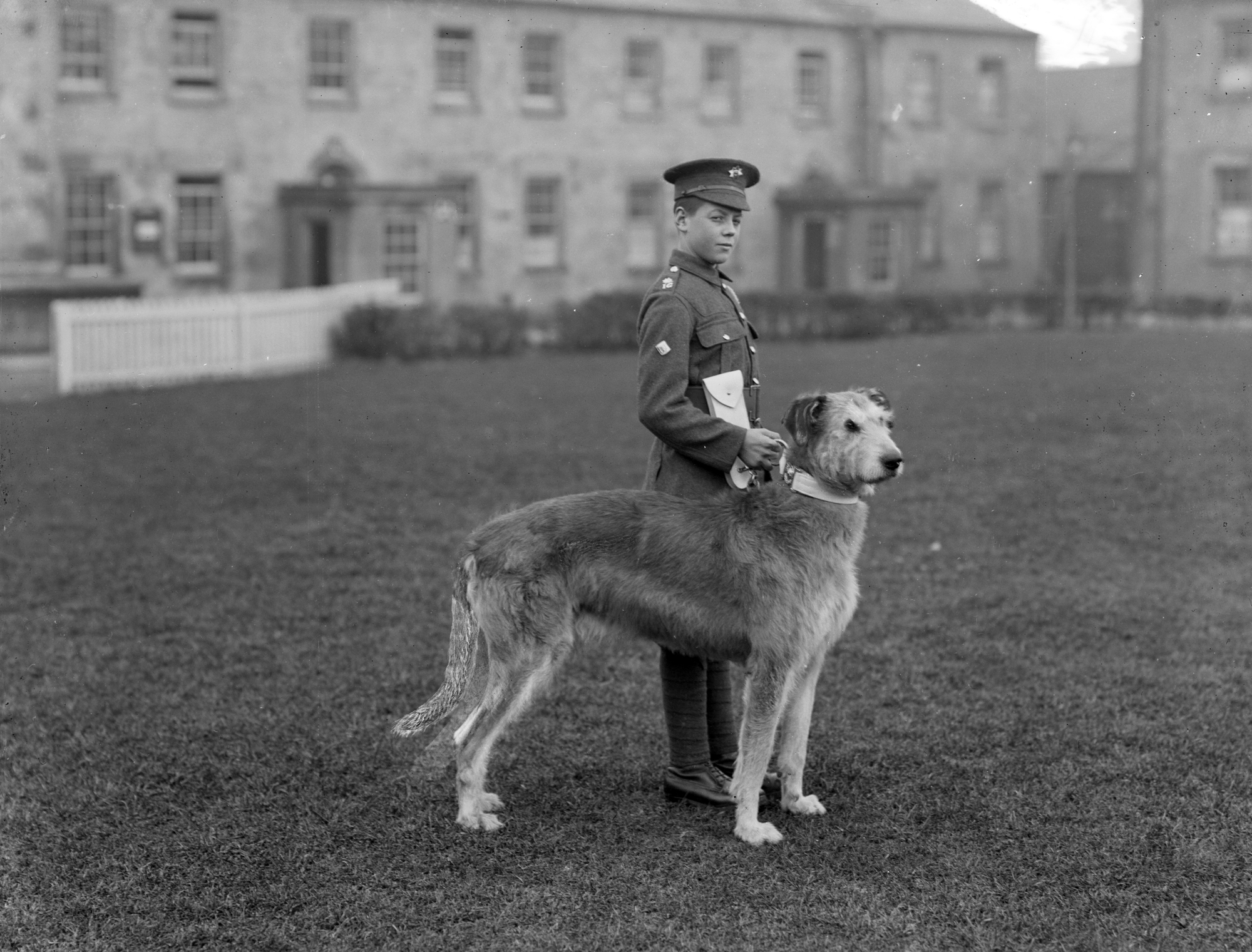
Irish Guards' Regimental Mascot -Leitrim Boy, an Irish Wolfhound in 1909 outside Waterford Barracks.

=== Irish Civil War ===
After the evacuation of British troops (Devonshire Regiment) from Waterford city at the end of the Irish War of Independence, the military and police barracks were occupied by the Waterford Flying Column, under the leadership of George Lennon of Dungarvan, which was part of the combined (1921) Waterford Brigade under the command of Pax Whelan from Dungarvan. These men opposed the Anglo-Irish Treaty of 1922 and therefore took the Republican side when the Irish Civil War commenced with the firing upon the Four Courts in late June 1922.

Republicans considered Waterford to be the eastern stronghold of the "Munster Republic", and linchpin of the 'Limerick-Waterford line'. In late July 1922, therefore, National Army troops under Major General John T. Prout, composed of 450 men, one 18-pounder artillery piece and 4 machine guns arrived from Kilkenny to re-take the city as part of a national offensive. Prout's second in command was Patrick Paul, formerly commander of the IRA in East Waterford. Arrested by his former comrades for supporting the Free State, he escaped disguised as a nun, to join the government forces in Kilkenny. Waterford City fell on the 20th of July 1922, just a day after Limerick City had fallen to the Free State Forces

The Republicans had chosen to defend the city along the southern bank of the river Suir, occupying the military barracks, the prison and the Post Office. Prout placed his artillery on Mount Misery overlooking their positions and bombarded the Republicans until they were forced to evacuate the barracks and prison. However, the gun had to be brought down to Ferrybank to fire over open sights before the Republicans abandoned the Post Office. Some street fighting followed before the Irregulars fled the city and retreated westward to Mount Congreve in Kilmeadan. Two Free State soldiers were killed in the fighting and one Republican fighter. Five civilians were also killed.

== Sources ==
- Waterford: A Municipal Directory
- Paul V Walsh, The Irish Civil War 1922–23 -A Study of the Conventional Phase.
- Downham, Clare (2004), "The historical importance of Viking-Age Waterford" (PDF), The Journal of Celtic Studies, 4: 71–96, archived from the original (PDF) on 16 July 2011
