= R560 road (Ireland) =

Road in Ireland

R560 road
- Bóthar R560
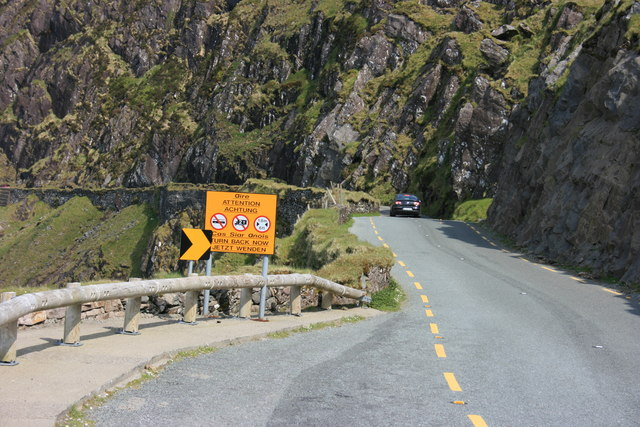
- R560 at Connor Pass

Route information
- Length: 31.9 km (19.8 mi)

Major junctions
- From: N86 at Knockglass More, County Kerry
- R550 at Crosaire An Choill Mhór (Kilmore Crossroads)
- To: N86 at Dingle

Location
- Country: Ireland

Highway system
- Roads in Ireland; Motorways; Primary; Secondary; Regional
← R559	→ R561

The R560 road is a regional road in Ireland. It is a road on the Dingle Peninsula in County Kerry. The road forms part of the Wild Atlantic Way.

The R560 travels southwest from the N86 near Camp via Connor Pass between the Brandon and central Dingle mountain groups. The pass summit, at an elevation of 460 m (1,500 ft), affords panoramic views of the Dingle area and Dingle Bay. From here, the road descends to end at Dingle. The R560 is 31.9 km (19.8 mi) long.
