= Slea Head =

Headland in County Kerry, Ireland

Coordinates: 52°6.37′N 10°28.15′W

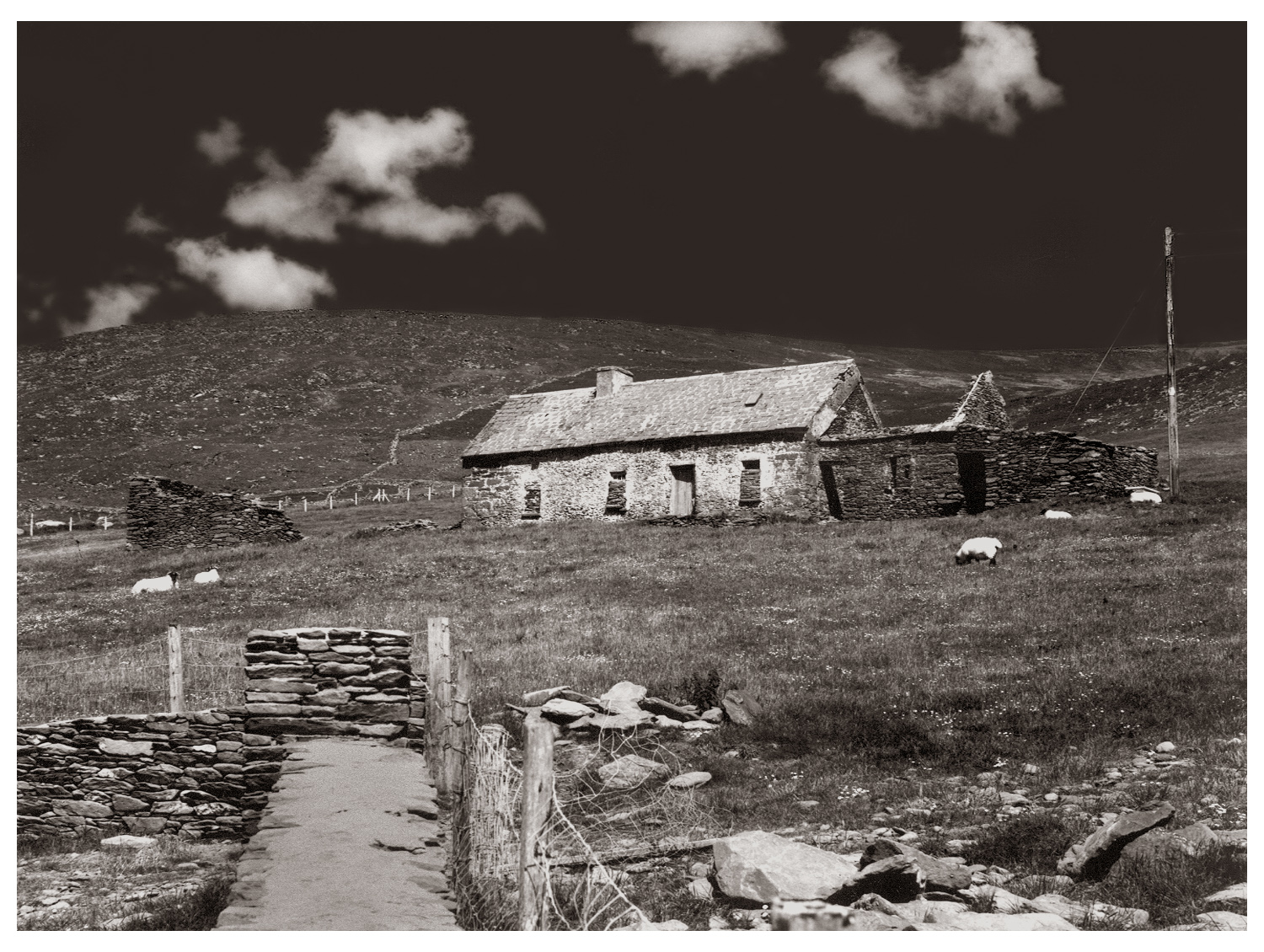
Abandoned farmhouse, Slea Head, 1986

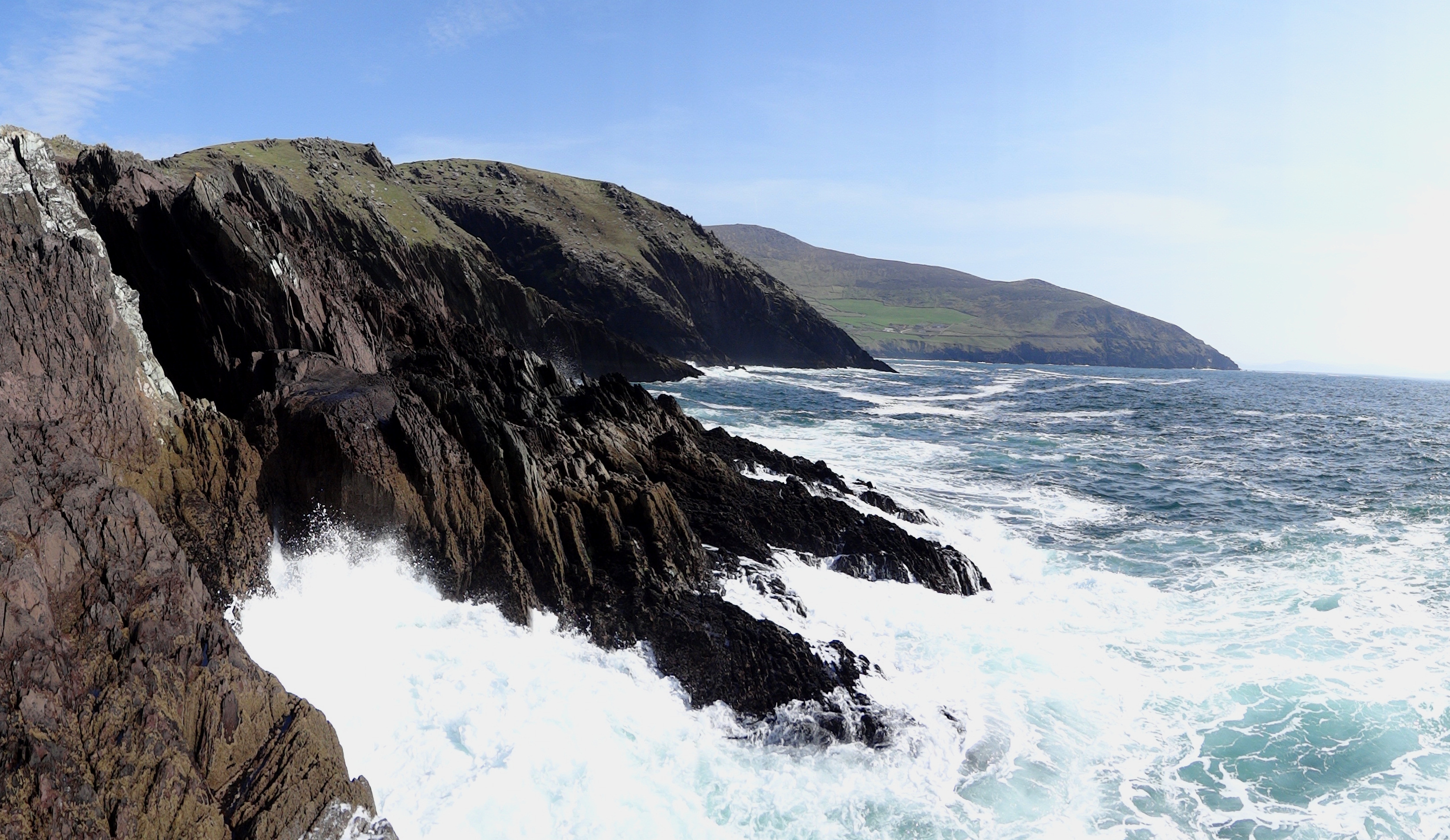
Slea Head is the promontory in the back to the right in this photo, taken from the very end of Dunmore Head, the westernmost point of Ireland.

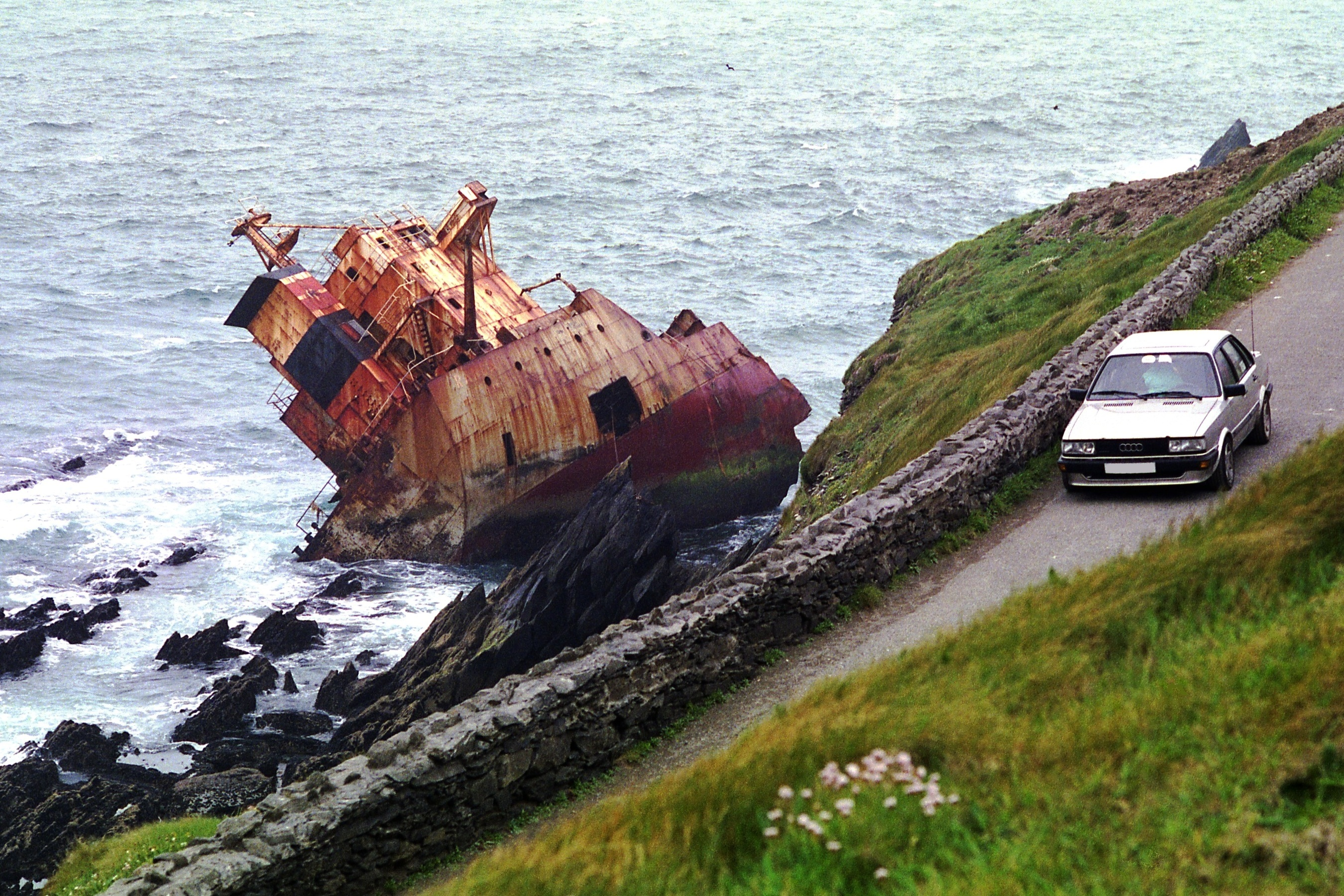
The Ranga, here pictured in 1986, was wrecked in 1982

Slea Head (Irish: Ceann Sléibhe) is a promontory on the westernmost part of the Dingle Peninsula, in southwest County Kerry, Ireland. It can be reached by the R559 road, with the nearest villages being Ballyickeen and Coumeenoole. The headland itself, together with the larger part of Mount Eagle's southern slopes, is formed from steeply dipping beds of the pebbly sandstones and conglomerates of the Slea Head Formation, dating from the Devonian period and traditionally referred to as old red sandstone.

To Slea Head's northwest is Dunmore Head, the westernmost point of Ireland. Slea Head is a well-known landmark and viewpoint, with a full view of the Blasket Islands. On 11 March 1982, the Spanish container ship, Ranga, was wrecked at Dunmore Head, close to Slea Head after losing power in a storm.

== Slea Head Drive ==
The Slea Head Drive is one of the Dingle Peninsula's most scenic routes. En route are several landmarks such as Ventry Beach, a pre-historic fort and beehive huts, the Dingle Famine Cottage, views of the Blasket Islands, Coumenole Beach and Gallarus Oratory. The loop road returns towards Dingle.

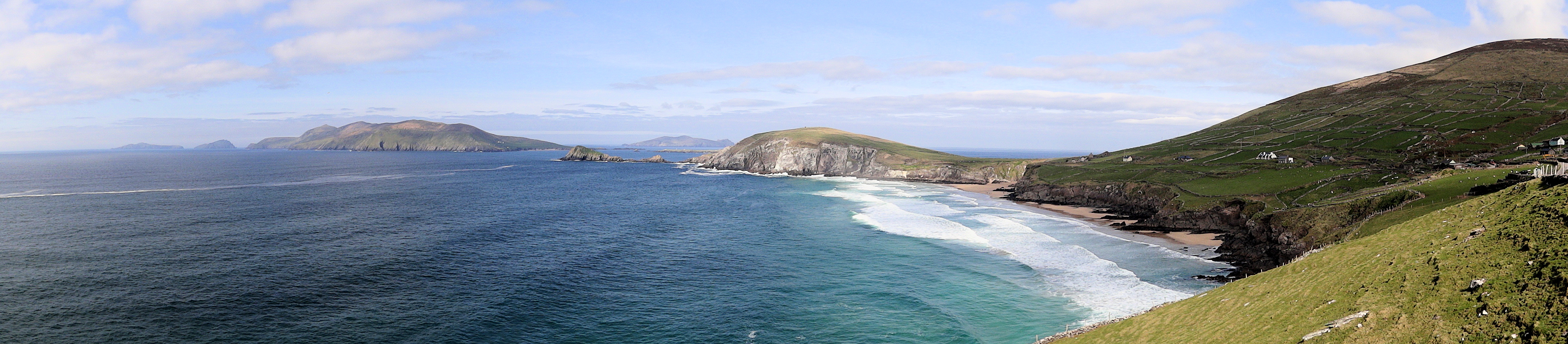
A view of Blasket Islands and Dunmore Head from Slea Head.
