= R549 road (Ireland) =

Regional road in County Kerry, Ireland

R549 road
- Bóthar R549
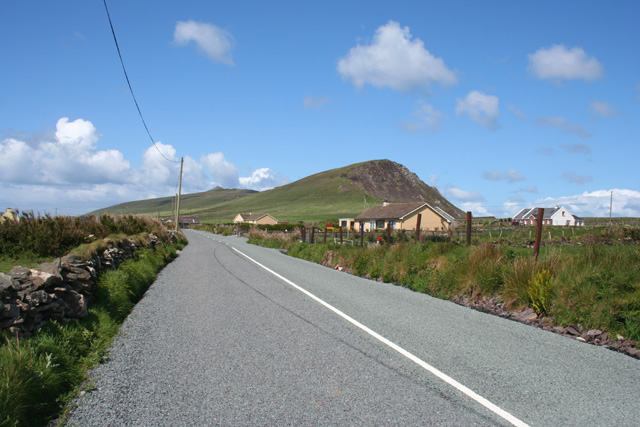
- R549 at Ballycurrane

Route information
- Length: 19.1 km (11.9 mi)

Major junctions
- From: R559 at An Mhuiríoch, County Kerry

- To: R559 at Dingle

Location
- Country: Ireland

Highway system
- Roads in Ireland; Motorways; Primary; Secondary; Regional
← R548	→ R550

The R549 road is a regional road on the Dingle Peninsula in County Kerry, Ireland. It travels from the R559 road at Murreagh (Irish: An Mhuiríoch), north to Ballydavid Head before turning south to rejoin the R559 at Dingle. The road is 19.1 kilometres (11.9 mi) long.
