= Coumeenoole =

Coumeenoole Com Dhíneol
- Village
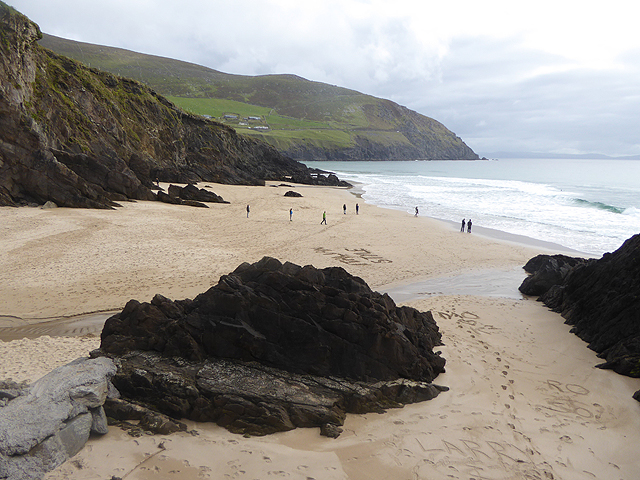
- Coumeenoole Beach

- Location in Ireland
- Coordinates: 52°06′36″N 10°27′46″W
- Country: Ireland
- Province: Munster
- County: County Kerry
- Time zone: UTC+0 (WET)
  - Summer (DST): UTC-1 (IST (WEST))

Coumeenoole (Irish: Com Dhíneol) is in County Kerry, Ireland. The townlands of Coumeenoole North and Coumeenoole South are in the civil parish of Dunquin in the barony of Corkaguiny. Due to its location on Slea Head, on the Dingle Peninsula, the beach at Coumeenoole Bay is a tourist destination. The area is connected to Dingle, to the east, via the R559 regional road. The 2011 census records no occupied houses in the townlands of Coumeenoole North and Coumeenoole South.
