= R550 road =

R550 road may refer to:

- R550 road (Ireland)
- R550 road (South Africa)
