= Garfinny Bridge =

Garfinny Bridge Droichead na Gairfeanaí
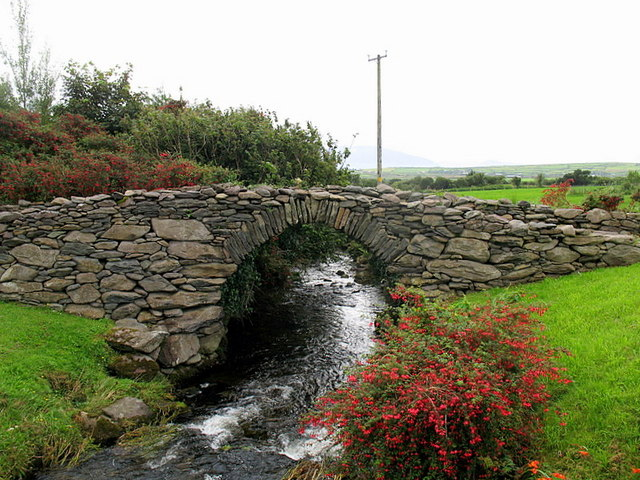
- Coordinates: 52.149939°N 10.227143°W
- Carries: local road
- Crosses: Garfinny River
- Locale: Garfinny, Dingle Peninsula, County Kerry
- Followed by: N86 bridge

Characteristics
- Design: Arch bridge
- Material: Stone
- Total length: 16 metres (52 ft)
- Width: 2.5 metres (8 ft 2 in)
- Height: 3 metres (9.8 ft)
- No. of spans: 1
- Design life: 500+ years

History
- Construction start: c. 1400

National monument of Ireland
- Official name: Garfinny Bridge
- Reference no.: 612

Garfinny Bridge is a medieval stone bridge located in County Kerry, Ireland. The bridge was designated as an Irish National Monument.

== Location ==
Garfinny Bridge crosses the Garfinny River on the Dingle Peninsula, 2.7 kilometres (1.7 mi) east-northeast of Dingle.

== History ==
The bridge is believed to have been built in the 14th or 15th centuries, and was supposedly crossed by Arthur Grey, 14th Baron Grey de Wilton (Lord Deputy of Ireland) in 1580 with his men on the way to the Siege of Smerwick, where they killed hundreds of prisoners.

By the 19th century, the bridge had begun to collapse and people forded it nearby. Nowadays, road traffic crosses over a modern bridge to the north.

== Description ==
Garfinny Bridge is a dry stone bridge made without mortar: the arch consists of radial stones which ‘spring’ from stones projecting over the river in a corbelling technique.

It is the only bridge to be an Irish National Monument.

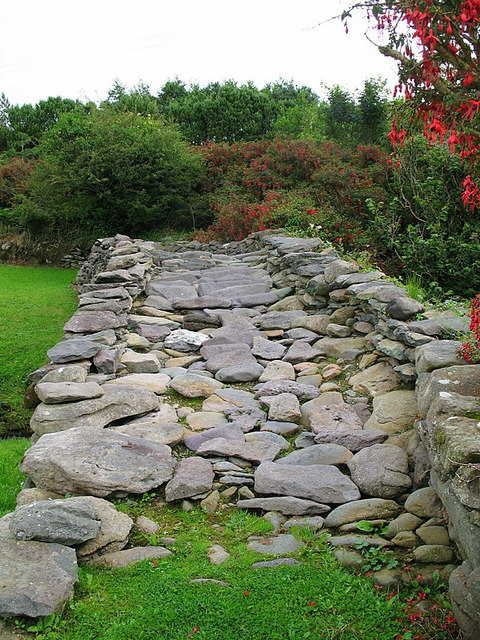

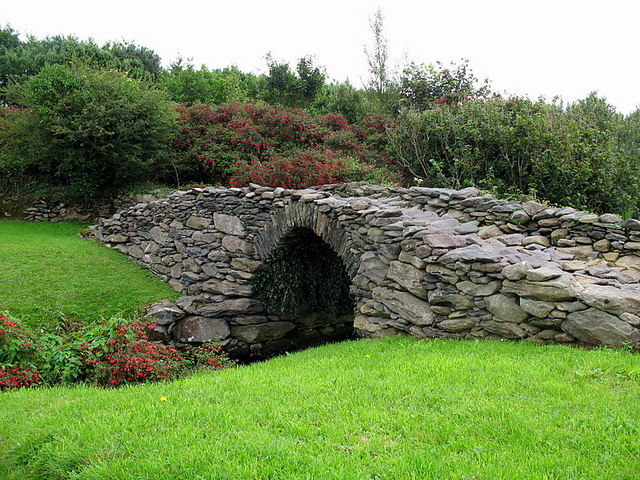
