= R560 road =

R560 road may refer to:

- R560 road (Ireland)
- R560 road (South Africa)
