= R549 road =

R549 road may refer to:

- R549 road (Ireland)
- R549 (South Africa)
