= Carhoo =

Carhoo may refer to the following places in the Republic of Ireland:

- Carhoo Hill
- Carhoo Lower
- Carhoo Upper
