= Caherboshina =

Townland on the Dingle Peninsula, Ireland

Caherboshina Cathair Bó Sine
- Townland
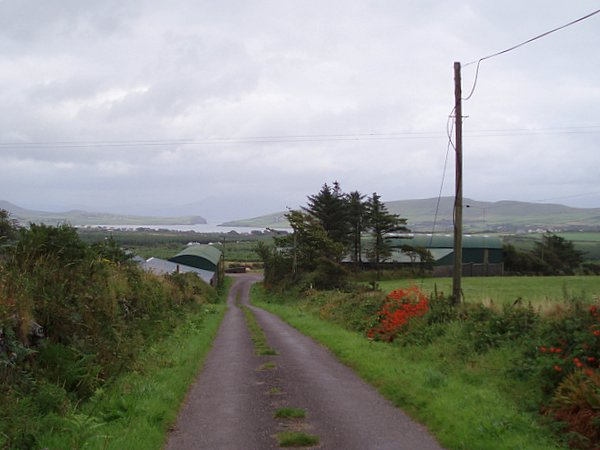
- Farmland and landscape at Caherboshina

- Location in Ireland
- Coordinates: 52°08′43″N 10°20′16″W
- Country: Ireland
- Province: Munster
- County: County Kerry

Area
  - Total: 1.8 km^{2} (0.69 sq mi)
- Time zone: UTC+0 (WET)
  - Summer (DST): UTC-1 (IST (WEST))
- Irish Grid Reference: Q401030

Caherboshina (Irish: Cathair Bó Sine) is a townland situated approximately 4 kilometres from Dingle (Daingean Uí Chúis) in County Kerry, Ireland. Its position lies at the almost latitudinal centre of Ireland's most westerly land-mass, Corcha Dhuibhne (the Dingle Peninsula).
