= Gallaunmore =

- An Gallán Mór (Irish)
- Ballineetig Standing Stone
- Location within Ireland
- 52.139260°N 10.222858°W
- Type: standing stone
- Location: Ballineetig, Dingle, County Kerry, Ireland

History
- Built: c. 4000 – 2500 BC

Site notes
- Height: 4.2 m (14 ft)
- Owner: State

National monument of Ireland
- Official name: Gallaunmore (Ballineetig)
- Reference no.: 355

Gallaunmore is a standing stone and National Monument located in County Kerry, Ireland.

Gallaunmore is located 3 km (1.9 mi) east of Dingle and 4 km (2.5 mi) west of Lispole, south of the N86 and north of the Trabeg Estuary.

The stone stands 4.2 m (14 ft) tall and is 1.8 m (5 ft 11 in) wide. The northwest and southeast sides taper towards the tip.
