= Conor Pass =

Mountain pass in County Kerry, Ireland

- An Chonair
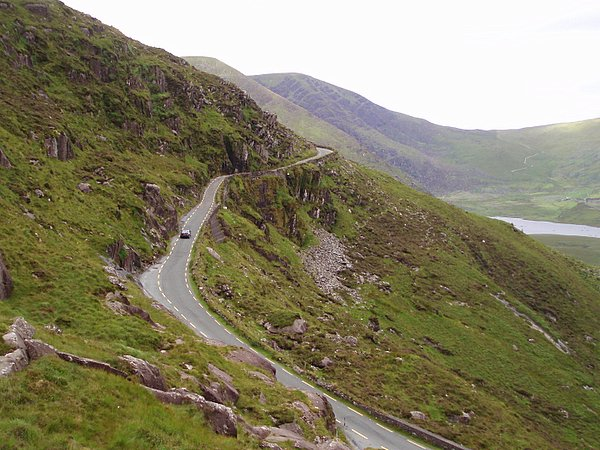
- Looking south to the highest point of the Conor Pass

- Location within Ireland
- Elevation: 456 m (1,496 ft)
- Traversed by: Road

Third Approach
- Location: County Kerry, Ireland
- Range: Mountains of the Central Dingle Peninsula
- Coordinates: 52°10′55″N 10°12′26″W

The Conor Pass or Connor Pass (Irish: An Chonair, 'the way or path') is one of the highest mountain passes in Ireland served by an asphalted road. It is on the R560 road on the Dingle Peninsula in County Kerry.

== Geography ==
The 456-metre (1,496 ft)-high pass on the Dingle Peninsula links Dingle, in the south-west, with Brandon Bay and Castlegregory in the north-east. The scenic road leading to the pass weaves its way around the sharp cliff faces and past high corrie lakes. At its highest point it passes between the mountain peaks of Binn Dubh ('Beenduff') and Sliabh Mhacha Ré ('Slievanea').

== Access ==
A twisty one-lane asphalted road leads to the pass. Traffic, however, operates in two directions, meaning that in face-to-face encounters, one car must reverse to the previous shouldered section of road. The drive is considered one of the most beautiful in Ireland. Vehicles over two tonnes in weight are prohibited from using the road in order to avoid difficulties in passing.

Bicycle ascent to the pass is one of the most famous and difficult climbs in Ireland.

== Gallery ==
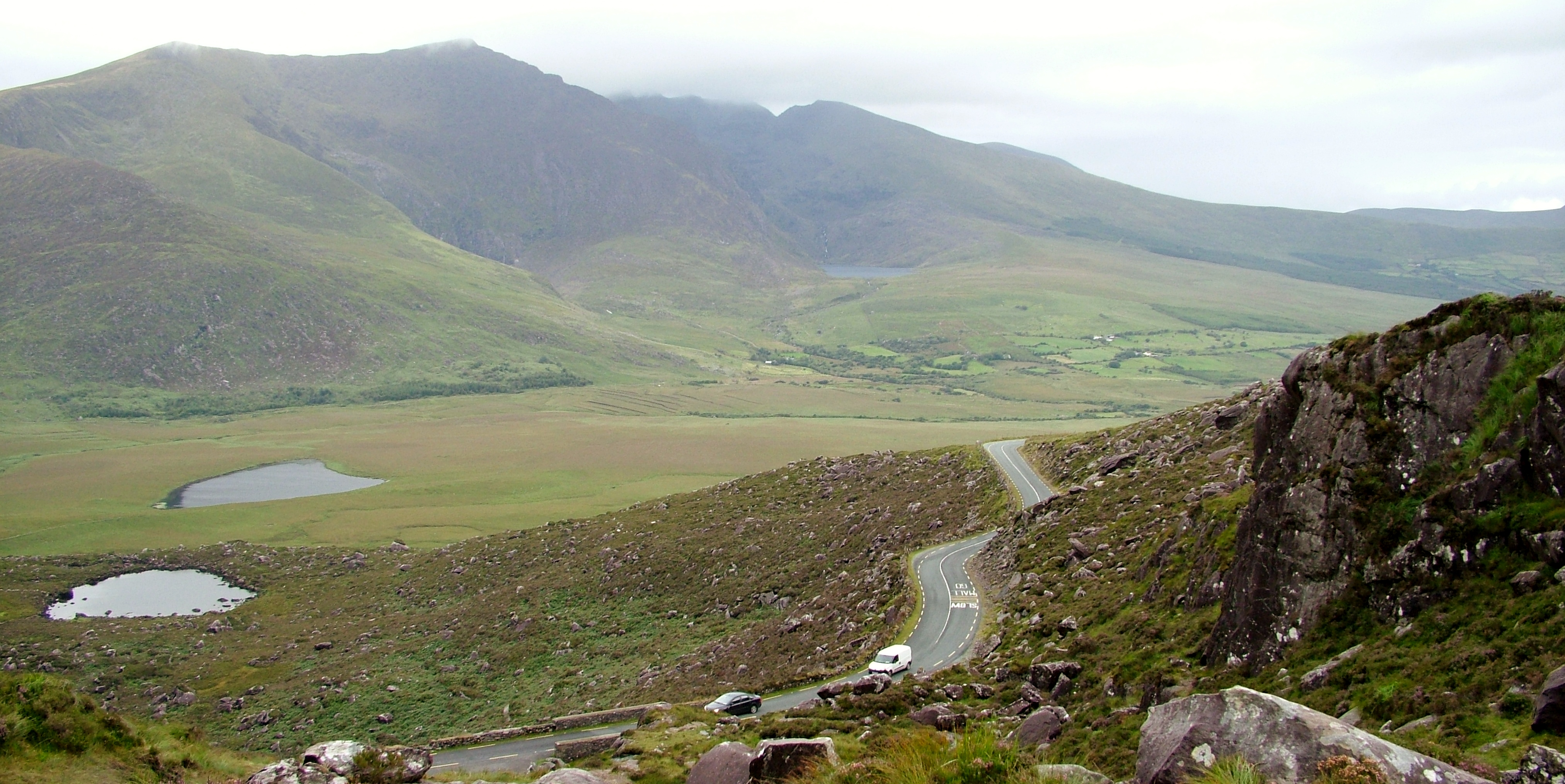
Looking north to Mount Brandon

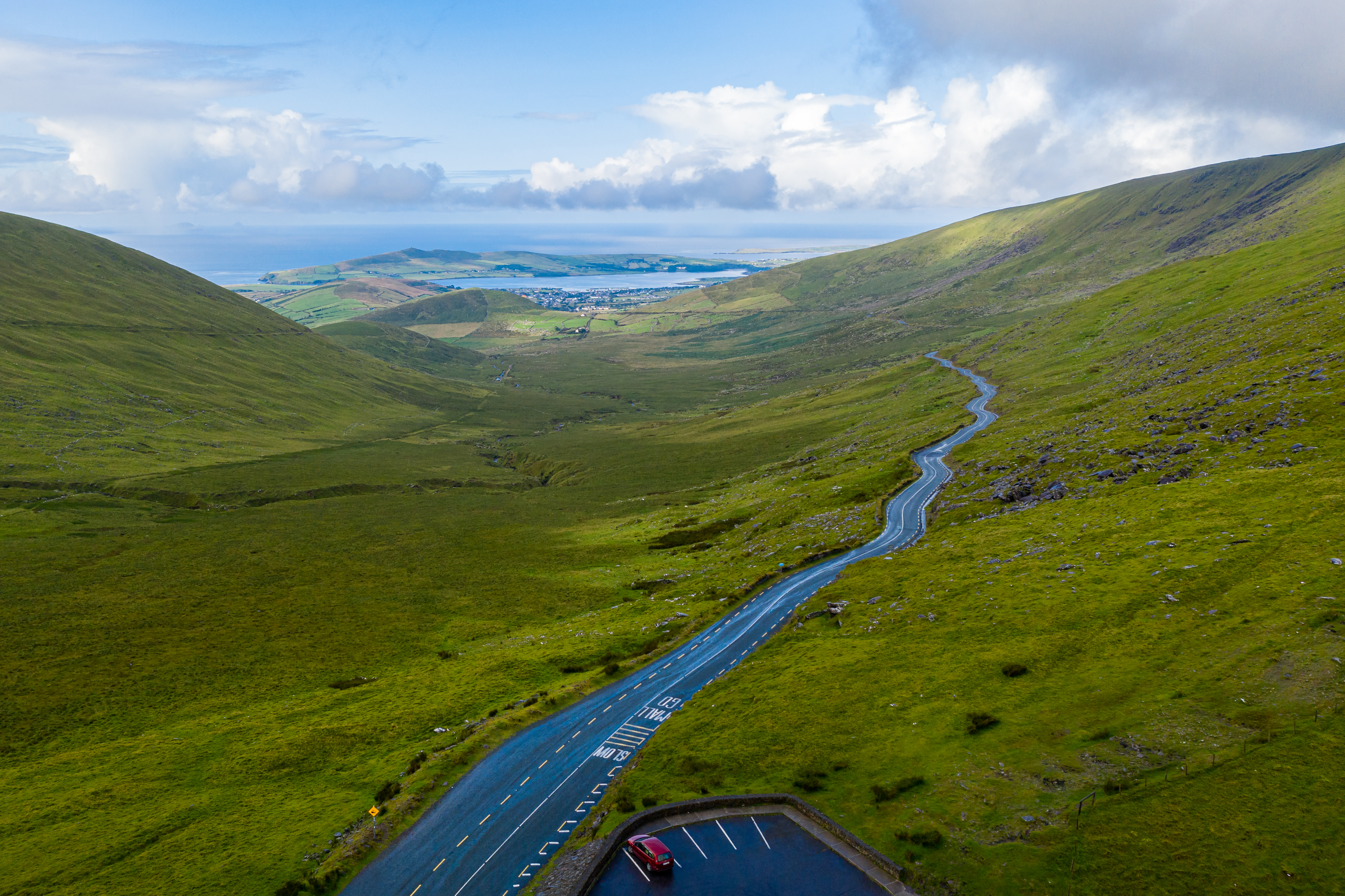
Looking south to Dingle.

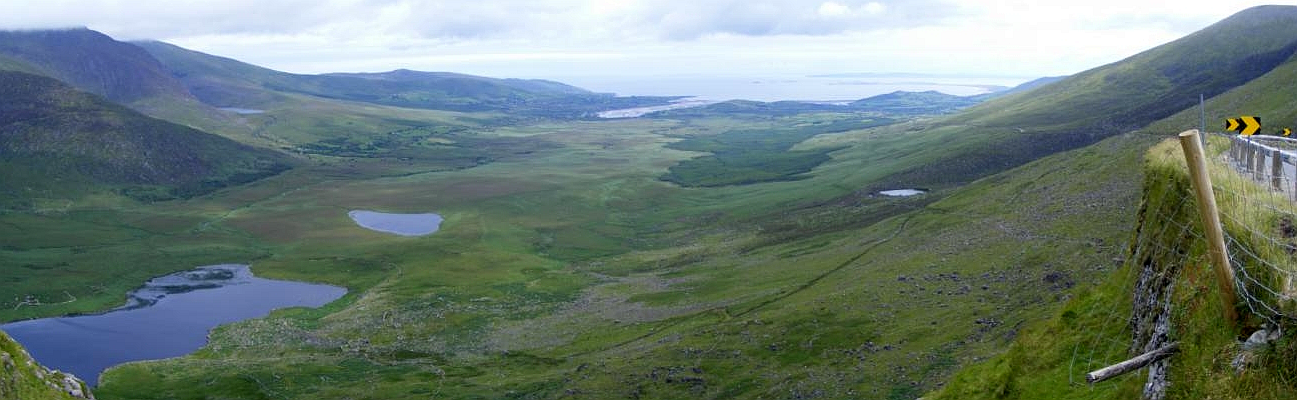
View of the Owenmore valley

== See also ==
- List of mountain passes
