= Extreme points of Ireland =

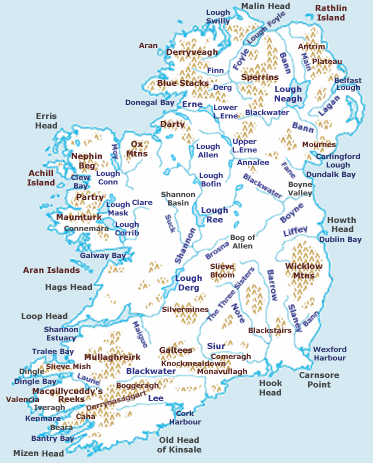
A physical map of Ireland

This is a list of the extreme points of Ireland – the points that are farthest north, south, east or west in Ireland. It includes the Republic of Ireland and Northern Ireland.

Often the term "Malin to Mizen" is used when encompassing the entire island from north to south. The geographical centre of Ireland is 8.85 kilometres north-northwest of Athlone Town.

== Whole island ==
=== Including islands ===
Points:

- Northernmost point: Tor Beg rock northeast of Inishtrahull, County Donegal, Republic of Ireland (ROI)
- Southernmost point: Fastnet Rock southeast of Cape Clear Island, County Cork, ROI
- Westernmost point: Tearaght Island, County Kerry, ROI
- Easternmost point: Cannon Rock, County Down, Northern Ireland (NI)

Settlements:

- Northernmost settlement: Ballyhillin, Inishowen Peninsula, County Donegal, ROI
- Southernmost settlement: Clear Island, County Cork, ROI
- Westernmost settlement: Dunquin, Dingle Peninsula, County Kerry, ROI
- Easternmost settlement: Portavogie, Ards Peninsula, County Down, NI

=== Mainland only ===
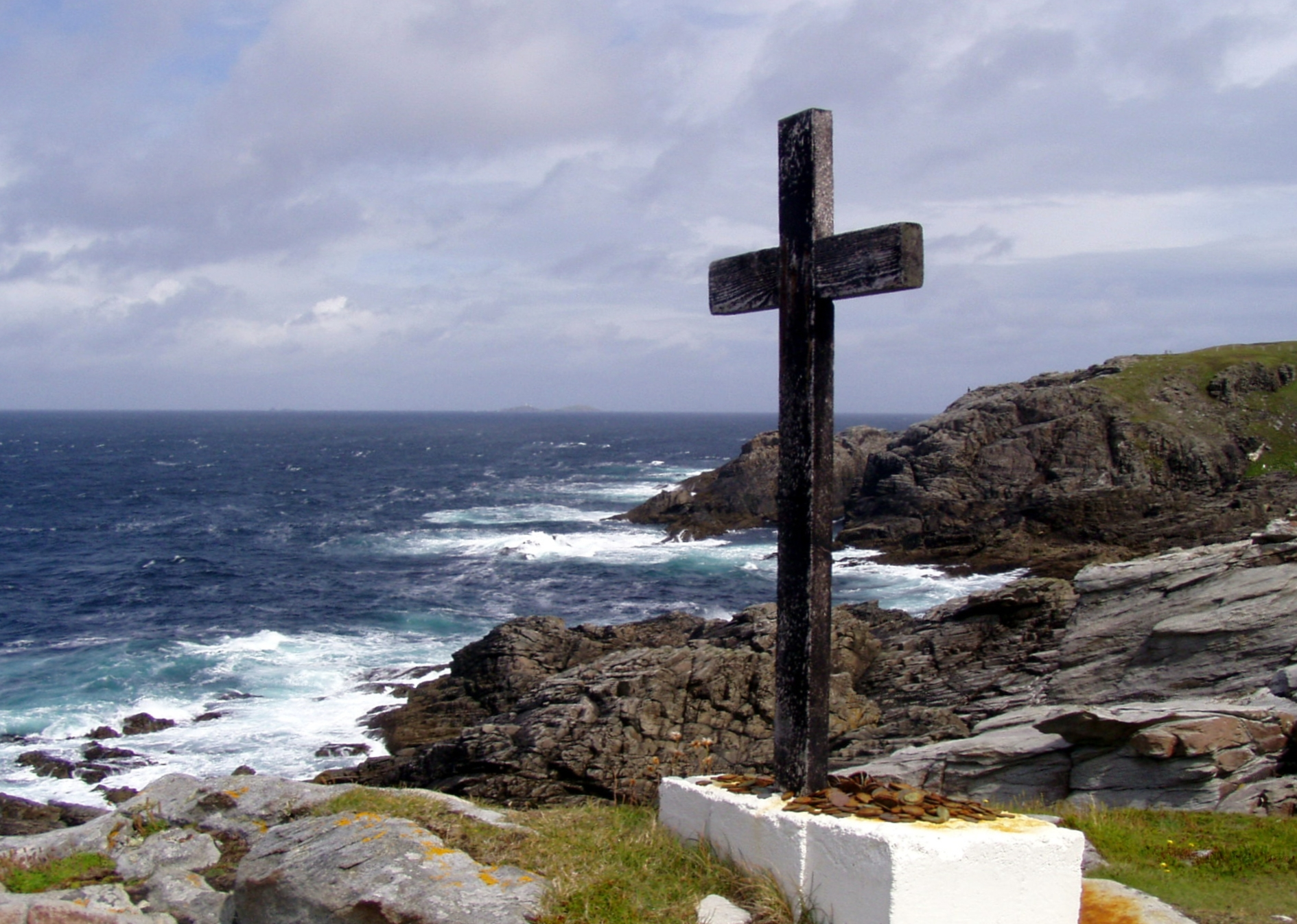
Cross erected near Banba's Crown, Ireland's northernmost point.

Points:

- Northernmost point: Banba's Crown (the tip of Malin Head), Inishowen Peninsula, County Donegal, ROI (Latitude: 55° 23′ 4″ N)
- Southernmost point: Brow Head (near Mizen Head), County Cork, ROI (Latitude: 51° 26′ 52″ N)
- Westernmost point: Dunmore Head, Dingle Peninsula, County Kerry, ROI at V 3014 9804 (Longitude: 10° 28′ 46″ W)
- Easternmost point: Burr Point, Ards Peninsula, County Down, NI (Longitude: 5° 25′ 58″ W)

Settlements:

- Northernmost settlement: Ballyhillin, Inishowen Peninsula, County Donegal, ROI
- Southernmost settlement: Crookhaven, County Cork, ROI
- Westernmost settlement: Dunquin, Dingle Peninsula, County Kerry, ROI
- Easternmost settlement: Portavogie, Ards Peninsula, County Down, NI

=== Altitude ===
- Highest point: Carrauntoohil, County Kerry, ROI (1,041 m / 3,466 ft)

== Republic of Ireland ==
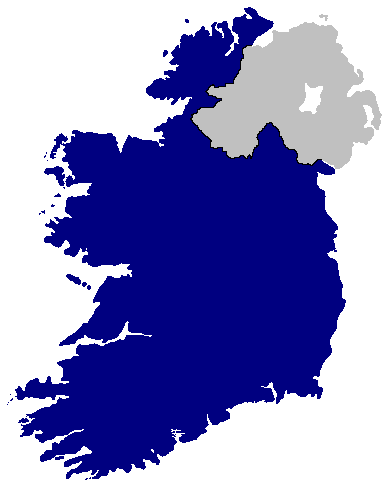
The Republic of Ireland (blue)

=== Including islands ===
- Northernmost point: Inishtrahull, County Donegal
- Northernmost settlement: Ballyhillin, Inishowen Peninsula, County Donegal
- Southernmost point: Fastnet Rock, County Cork
- Southernmost settlement: Crookhaven, County Cork
- Westernmost point: Tearaght Island, County Kerry
- Westernmost settlement: Dunquin, Dingle Peninsula, County Kerry
- Easternmost point: Lambay Island, County Dublin
- Easternmost settlement: Wicklow, County Wicklow

=== Mainland only ===
- Northernmost point: Banba's Crown (the tip of Malin Head), Inishowen Peninsula, County Donegal
- Northernmost settlement: Ballyhillin, Inishowen Peninsula, County Donegal
- Southernmost point: Brow Head (near Mizen Head), County Cork
- Southernmost settlement: Crookhaven, County Cork
- Westernmost point: Dunmore Head, Dingle Peninsula, County Kerry
- Westernmost settlement: Dunquin, County Kerry
- Easternmost point: Wicklow Head, County Wicklow
- Easternmost settlement: Wicklow, County Wicklow

=== Altitude ===
- Highest point: Carrauntoohil, County Kerry
- Lowest point: There are no points below mean sea level, which diverges locally from Malin ordnance datum. There are reclaimed lands below high tide level and requiring valve or pump drainage, as in the Wexford Sloblands, and parts of Cork city.

== Northern Ireland ==
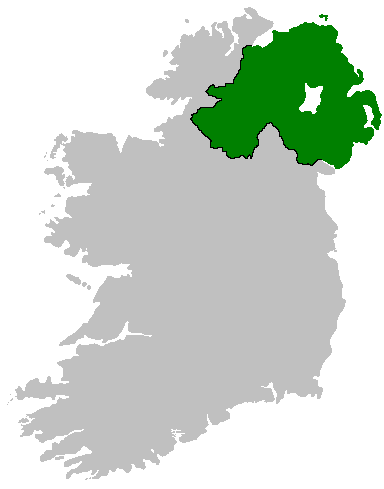
Northern Ireland (green)

=== Including islands ===
- Northernmost point: Skerriagh, Ballygill North, Rathlin Island at 55°18′N 6°14′W
- Northernmost settlement: Rathlin Island, County Antrim at 55°17′N 6°11′W
- Southernmost point: Cranfield Point, County Down at 54°1′N 6°3′W
- Southernmost settlement: Greencastle, County Down at 54°2′N 6°5′W
- Westernmost point – western part of Manger townland, County Fermanagh (immediately east of the Bradogue Bridge) at 54°27′53″N 8°10′39″W
- Westernmost settlement: Belleek, County Fermanagh at 54°48′N 8°08′W
- Easternmost point: Canon Rock, County Down at 54°29′N 5°25′W
- Easternmost settlement: Portavogie, County Down at 54°27′N 5°26′W

=== Mainland only ===
- Northernmost point: Benbane Head, County Antrim at 55°15′N 6°28′W
- Northernmost settlement: Ballintoy, County Antrim at 55°14′N 6°21′W
- Southernmost point: Cranfield Point, County Down at 54°1′N 6°3′W
- Southernmost settlement: Greencastle, County Down at 54°2′N 6°5′W
- Westernmost point – western part of Manger townland, County Fermanagh (immediately east of the Bradogue Bridge) at 54°27′53″N 8°10′39″W
- Westernmost settlement: Belleek, County Fermanagh at 54°48′N 8°08′W
- Easternmost point: Burr Point, Ards Peninsula, County Down at 55°29′N 5°26′W
- Easternmost settlement: Portavogie, County Down at 54°27′N 5°26′W

=== Altitude ===
- Highest point: Slieve Donard, County Down (850 m / 2,789 ft)

== See also ==
- Extreme points of the United Kingdom
- Extreme points of Europe
- Extreme points of Earth
- Geography of Ireland
- Extreme points of the British Isles

== Sources ==
- Pugh, David T.; Bridge, Edmund; Edwards, Robin; Hogarth, Peter; Westbrook, Guy; Woodworth, Philip L.; McCarthy, Gerard D. (11 November 2021). "Mean sea level and tidal change in Ireland since 1842: a case study of Cork". Ocean Science. 17 (6): 1623–1637. doi:10.5194/os-17-1623-2021.
