= Burr Point =

Burr Point An Bior
- Geographic point
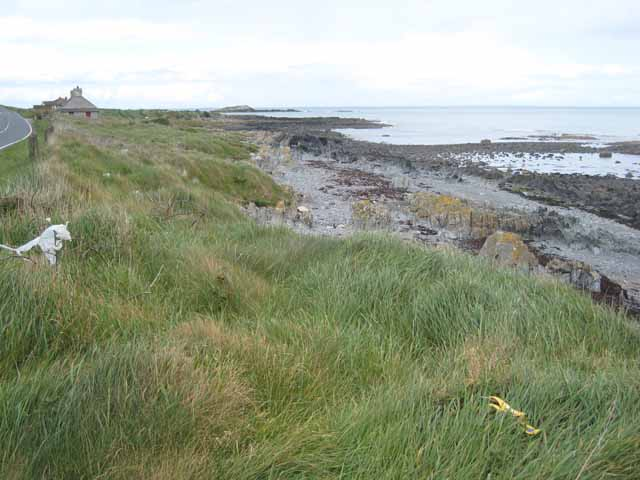
- Etymology: Irish bior, "point"
- Location within island of Ireland Location within Northern Ireland Location within County Down
- Coordinates: 54.48714°N 5.43291°W
- Country: Northern Ireland
- County: Down
- Townland: Ballyhalbert
- Time zone: UTC+0 (GMT)
  - Summer (DST): UTC+1 (BST)

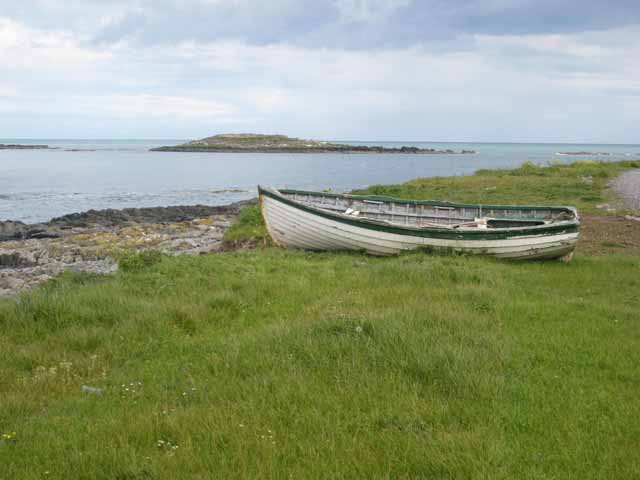
Burial Island off Burr Point

Burr Point is considered the easternmost point of mainland Northern Ireland and the Island of Ireland. It is located in the townland of Ballyhalbert on the Ards Peninsula in County Down, at longitude 5.4326ºW, although the monument is at longitude 5.4397ºW. It is a just over a mile (or 2 km) southeast of Ballyhalbert village.

The most easterly point of all Northern Ireland and Ireland is a small rock named Cannon Rock, a rock situated 4.08 kilometres off the Ards Peninsula, at longitude 5.42ºW.

== Geographic and cultural features ==
Burr Point is located on the Ards Peninsula, about 2 km southeast of Ballyhalbert village. It features a sculpture of the letter “E” by artist Ned Jackson Smyth, symbolizing "East" and navigation. Commissioned in 2012 and restored in 2022, the 2.5-metre diameter sculpture is situated in Ballyhalbert harbour.

Nearby is Burial Island, a small rocky islet a few hundred metres offshore. It is believed to have been a Viking burial site. The presence of Vikings in the region is supported by linguistic evidence and archaeological findings. The first element of the name Strangford is believed to derive from the Old Norse adjective strangr, meaning "strong", referring to the strong tidal currents at the narrow strait between Strangford and Portaferry (just 10 miles from Burr Point). This etymology indicates Norse influence in the area, consistent with known Viking activity along the eastern coast of Ireland during the early medieval period. Legend has it that the island contains a Danish Viking burial chamber full of gold. However, the interpretation of Burial Island as a Viking burial site remains speculative. An alternative explanation for the name is that it derives from the Irish term for cormorant, na broighill.

A Coastguard Station was established at Ballyhalbert in 1863. A now-disused coastguard lookout remains situated on the hill above Burr Point, contributing to the site's maritime heritage. In 1864, four Coastguards from Ballyhalbert Coastguard Station were awarded money from the Board of Trade Mercantile Marine Fund for rescuing the crew of the stranded vessel "Countess of Morley" on January 9, 1864. The schooner Countess of Morley, registered in Fleetwood, was transporting iron ore from Whitehaven to Glasgow.

== Ecology and wildlife ==
Burial Island, located off Burr Point on the Ards Peninsula in County Down, Northern Ireland, is a seasonal nesting site for terns. A documented nest on the island confirms its use by ground-nesting tern species.

The surrounding coastal environment is characteristic of the Irish Sea coastline, comprising sandy beaches, rocky outcrops, and intertidal zones. These habitats support a range of marine and coastal species, including seabirds, invertebrates, and marine flora. Several rare bird species have been recorded in Burial Island, including the white stork, western subalpine warbler, European bee-eater and Cetti's warbler.

== Access and visitor information ==
Burr Point is accessible by car via Shore Road from Millisle or Newtownards. Visitors are advised to park at Ballyhalbert Harbour and walk, as the road to the point is for residents only and lacks turning space.

Facilities include a small car park and public toilets, and the area is suitable for short coastal walks and scenic views, including occasional glimpses of the Isle of Man on clear days.
