= Carhoo Hill =

Hill in County Kerry, Ireland

- Cnoc na Ceathrún
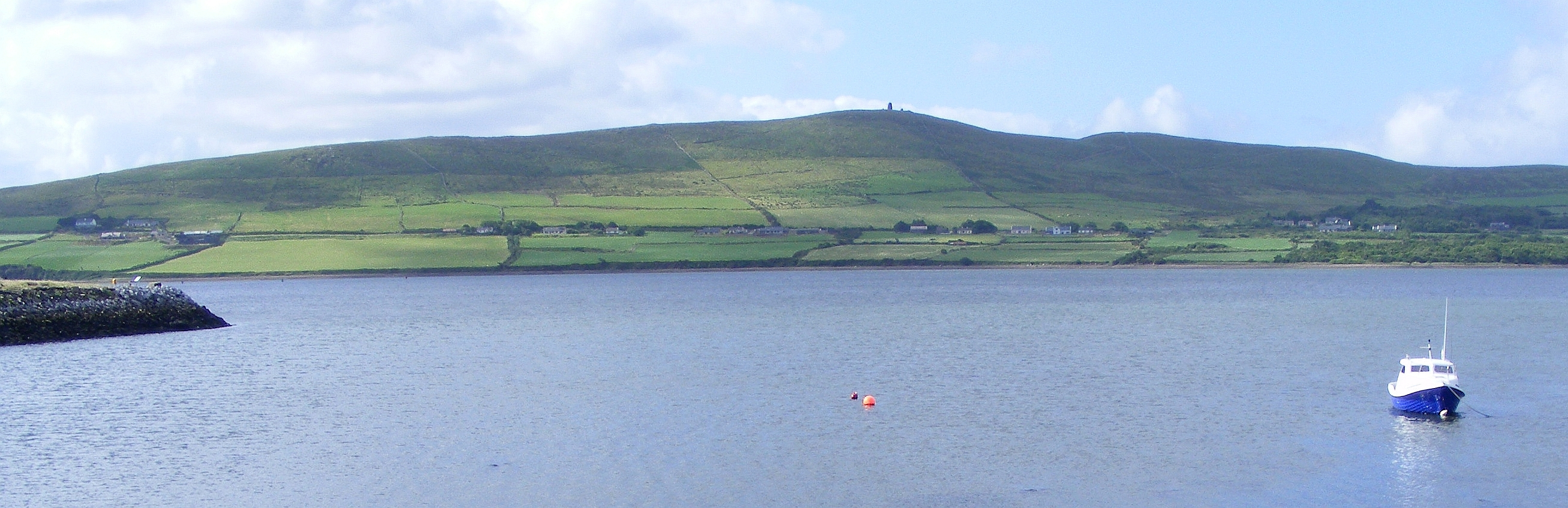
- Carhoo Hill from Dingle Harbour

Highest point
- Elevation: 184 m (604 ft)
- Prominence: 169 m (554 ft)
- Isolation: 4.01 km (2.49 mi)
- Listing: Marilyn
- Coordinates: 52°08′23.7″N 10°16′17.5″W

Naming
- English translation: Hill of the quarter
- Language of name: Irish

Geography
- Location within island of Ireland
- Location: County Kerry, Ireland
- OSI/OSNI grid: V437983

Climbing
- First ascent: ancestral
- Easiest route: hike

Carhoo Hill or Ballymacadoyle Hill (Irish: Cnoc na Ceathrún, meaning 'Hill of the quarter') is a large hill south-west of Dingle in County Kerry, Ireland.

== Geography ==
The 184-metre (604 ft) high hill stands 4 km west of Dingle in an isolated position in the short peninsula dividing Dingle Harbour from the Atlantic Ocean.

The top of the hill hosts the Eask Tower, a solid stone tower built in 1847. It offers a view on a long stretch of Dingle Peninsula and Iveragh Peninsula.

== Name ==
The English meaning of Cnoc na Ceathrún is hill of the quarter.

== Access to the summit ==
The walk which leads up to the summit takes 1.6 km from the asphalted road. Due to the very interesting panorama it's advisable to choose a clear day for it.

== See also ==
- List of Marilyns in Ireland
- Dingle Bay
