= R548 road (Ireland) =

Regional road in County Cork, Ireland

R548 road
- Bóthar R548
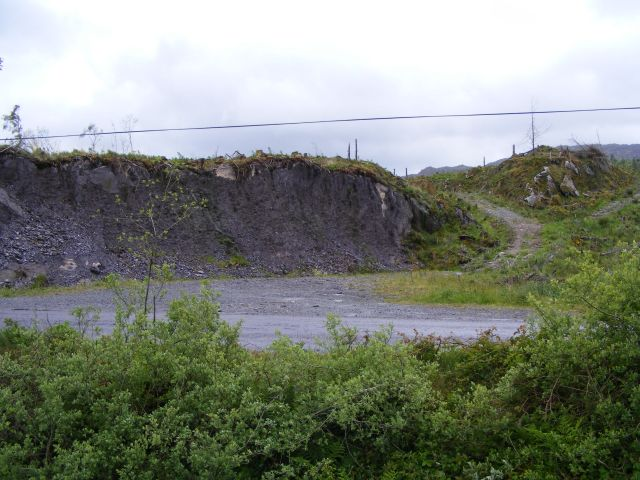
- Quarry beside R548

Route information
- Length: 2.1 km (1.3 mi)

Major junctions
- From: R584

Location
- Country: Ireland

Highway system
- Roads in Ireland; Motorways; Primary; Secondary; Regional
← R527	→ R549

The R548 road is a regional road in County Cork, Ireland. The R548 is a short spur off the R584 leading from Doirín Dún Aodha (Derreendonee) to the Aireagal Ghuagán Barra (Gougane Barra Oratory) car park.

== Sources ==
- "S.I. No. 54/2012 – Roads Act 1993 (Classification of Regional Roads) Order 2012". Government of Ireland. 28 February 2012.
