= Dunmore Head =

Place in Kerry, Ireland

Dunmore Head An Dún Mór
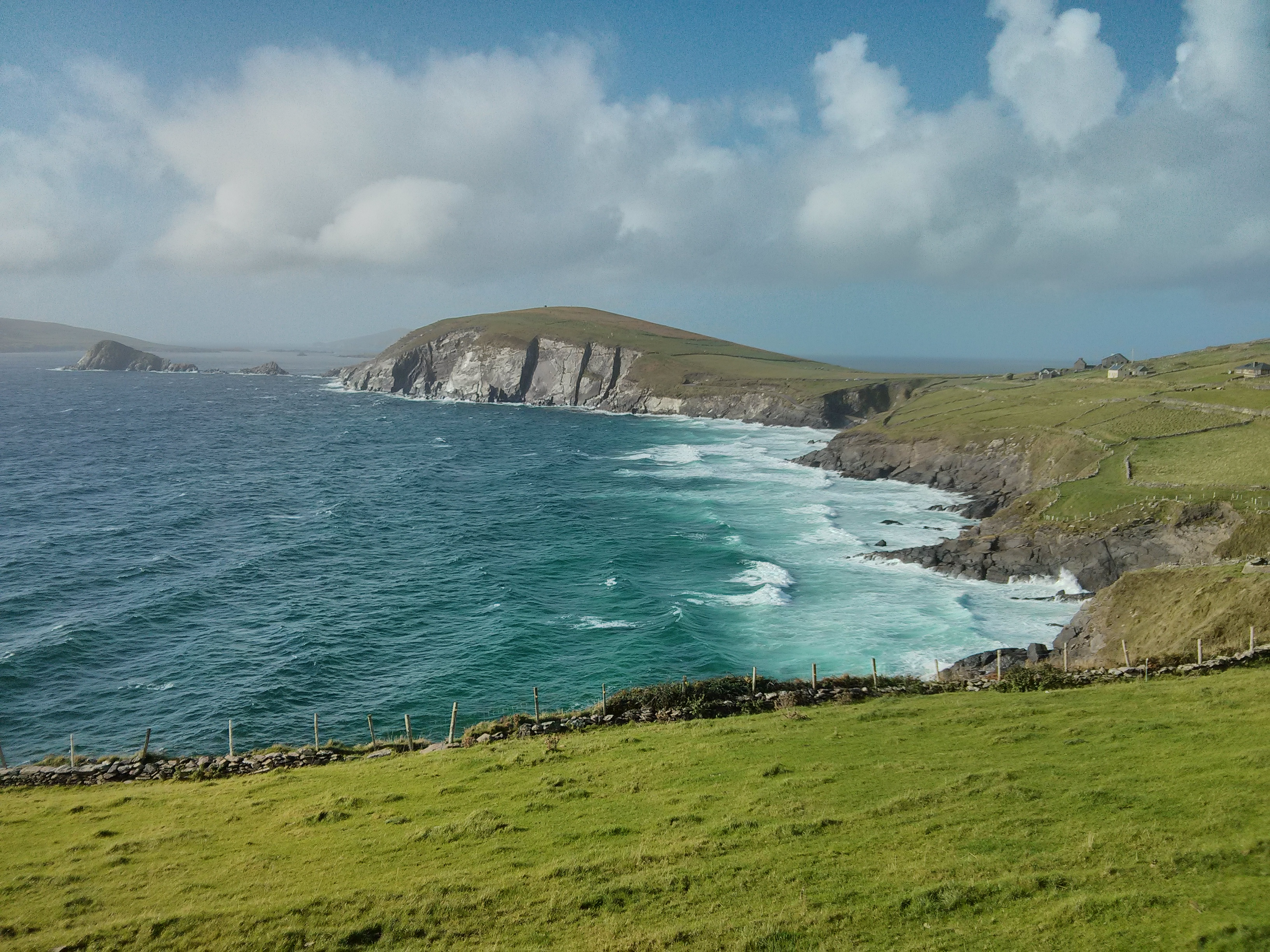
- Etymology: Irish dún mór, "great hillfort"
- Location within Ireland
- Coordinates: 52°6′31″N 10°28′54″W
- Country: Ireland
- County: Kerry

Dunmore Head (Irish: An Dún Mór) is a promontory in the westernmost part of the Dingle Peninsula, located in the barony of Corca Dhuibhne in southwest County Kerry, Ireland. The headland, together with parts of Mount Eagle's northern slopes is formed from steeply dipping beds of the cross-bedded sandstones of the Eask Sandstone Formation, dating from the Devonian period and traditionally referred to as the Old Red Sandstone.

Dunmore Head is the westernmost point of mainland Ireland and one of the westernmost points of Europe. On 11 March 1982, the Spanish container ship, MV Ranga, was wrecked at Dunmore Head, close to Slea Head after losing power in a storm.
