= Paudie Fitzgerald =

Irish cyclist (1933–2020)

Personal information
- Full name: Padraig Fitzgerald
- Nicknames: Paudi, Paudie
- Born: 5 December 1933 Lispole, County Kerry, Ireland
- Died: 3 December 2020 (aged 86)

Cycling career
- Sport: Cycling
- Discipline: Road bicycle racing
- Role: Rider

Major wins
- Rás Tailteann (1956)

Padraig "Paudie" Fitzgerald (5 December 1933 – 3 December 2020) was an Irish cyclist. He won the Rás Tailteann in 1956. He was also known for a failed attempt to represent Ireland at the 1956 Summer Olympics.

== Early life ==
Fitzgerald is a native of Lispole.

== Career ==
Fitzgerald started his career at grass track racing.

His first big win was a race from Dublin to Galway to Dublin, for which he won a battery for a bicycle light.

Fitzgerald competed in the first Rás, in 1953.

In the 1956 Rás Tailteann, Fitzgerald won two stages and the overall prize.

=== 1956 Olympics ===
Fitzgerald, along with Tommy Flanagan and Tom Gerrard, attempted to compete for Ireland at the team road race event at the 1956 Summer Olympics in Melbourne. They were chosen by the 32-county National Cycling Association (NCA), which was not internationally recognised (instead, there was Cumann Rothaíochta na hÉireann and the Northern Ireland Cycling Federation). They aimed to "gate-crash" the race, remove Union Jack flags and extinguish the Olympic flame; they succeeded in none of these, but did attract international attention to the NCA's plight.

== Later life ==
Fitzgerald retired from cycling in 1957. He ran a hardware shop, Fitzgerald's Homevalue, in Dingle. He was married twice and has seven children; Gaelic footballer Paul Geaney is one of his grandchildren.

He lived in Dingle and was President of Dingle Cycling Club and organised "Ride Dingle" a new Dingle-based cycling race.

Fitzgerald died on 3 December 2020, aged 86.
