= Eask Tower =

Stone tower in Kerry, Ireland

Coordinates: 52.115539°N 10.28124°W

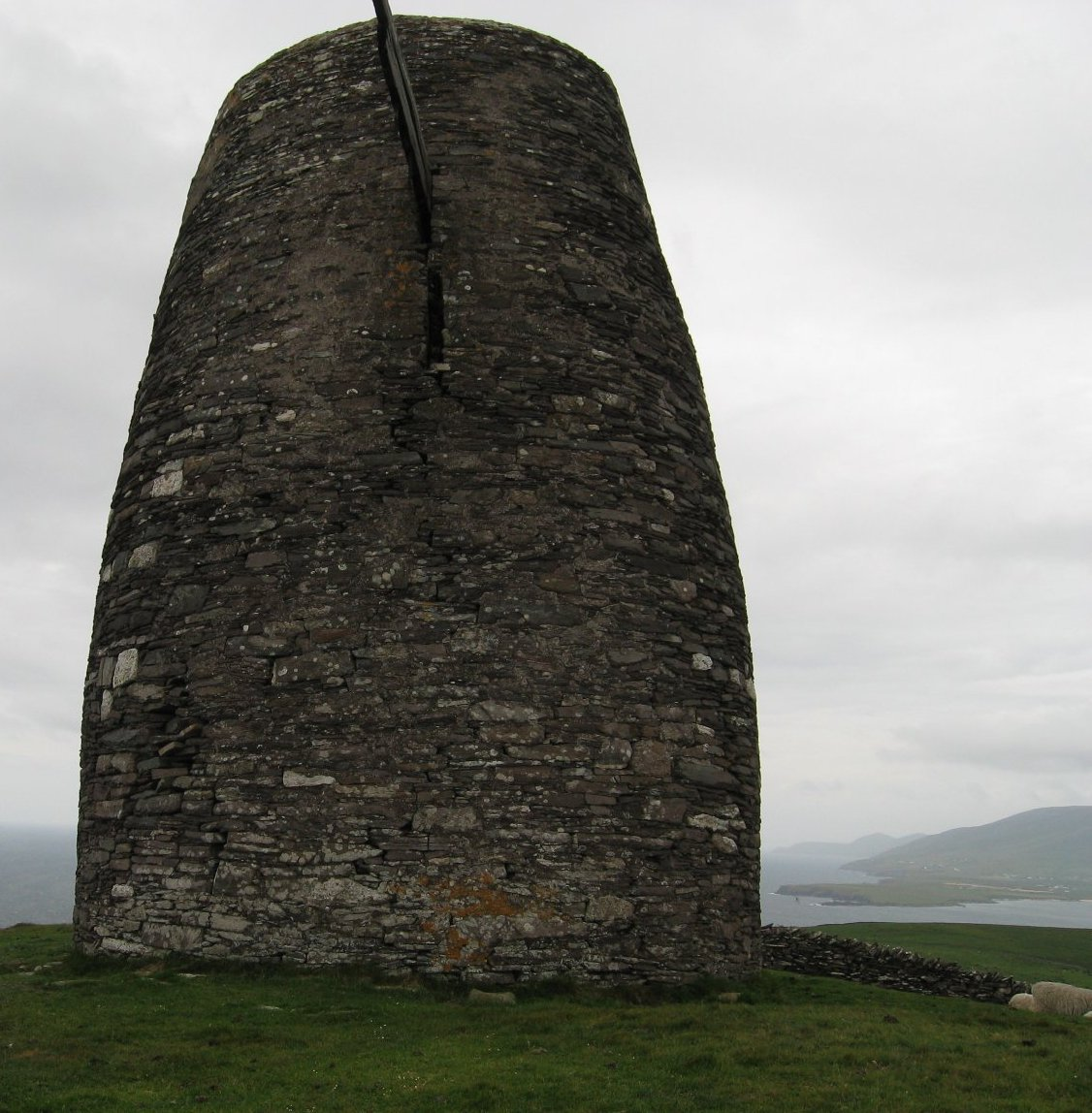
Eask Tower with view of the tip of the Ring of Kerry in foreground

The Eask Tower is a solid stone tower on the top of Carhoo Hill, in County Kerry, Ireland, overlooking Dingle harbour.

== Description ==
Eask Tower was built in 1847 in order to guide the ships and boats into the mouth of the harbour. The wooden hand pointing from the Tower guides the boats to their destination. It is crowned with the 19th century's mariners beacon and a World War II look-out post. The harbour has a "blind" mouth, so the purpose of the tower is to advise the ships to retract their sails, lose speed and thus safely sail around the harbour mouth.

The tower is of solid stone. The building of it on Carhoo (Ceathru) hill, 180 metres (600 ft) above sea level, provided work during the Great Famine, at the instigation of Reverend Charles Gayer, leader of the Protestants, in an attempt to win converts. The tower was originally 8.2 metres (27 ft) high, but around the year 1900, the old hand was removed and an extra 4.0 metres (13 ft) of stone was added to its height. A new hand was placed, roughly at the beginning of the extension.

The panoramic views seen from Carhoo Hill include a large proportion of the Dingle Peninsula and beyond; for example, the Blasket Islands, Slea Head, Ventry, Dingle Harbour, the Iveragh Peninsula, Skellig Rocks, and two of Ireland's highest mountains - Carrauntoohil and Mount Brandon.
