= Cannon Rock =

Island in Northern Ireland

Coordinates: 54°24′28.7″N 5°21′59.6″W

Cannon Rock is a skerry in the North Channel off the coast of the Ards Peninsula near Cloughey, County Down, Northern Ireland. It is the easternmost point of Ireland. Cannon Rock is east of South Rock, on which there is a disused lighthouse.

== Marine hazard ==
The rock is a hazard to shipping. Between 1861 and 1865, nine vessels ran aground on it.
