= R550 road (Ireland) =

Road in Ireland

Coordinates: 52.238990°N 10.177821°W

R550 road
- Bóthar R550
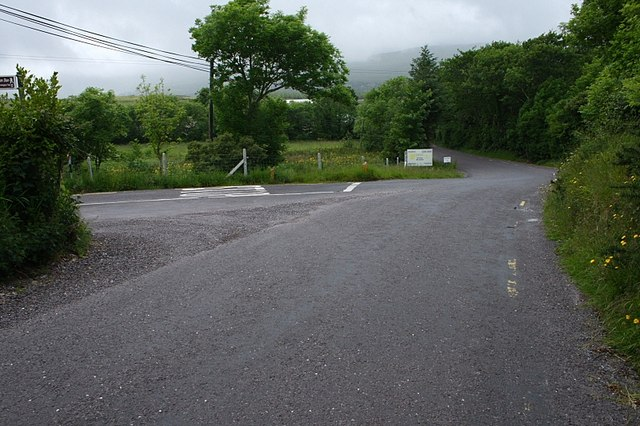
- Junction on the R550

Route information
- Length: 10.3 km (6.4 mi)

Major junctions
- From: Brandon Point
- To: R560 Kilmore Crossroads

Location
- Country: Ireland

Highway system
- Roads in Ireland; Motorways; Primary; Secondary; Regional

The R550 road is a regional road in Ireland, located on the Dingle Peninsula, County Kerry.

== Former route ==
The R550 originally connected the Tarbert - Killimer ferry to the N69. This is now part of the N67.
