= Lispole =

Village in County Kerry, Ireland

Lios Póil Lispole
- Village
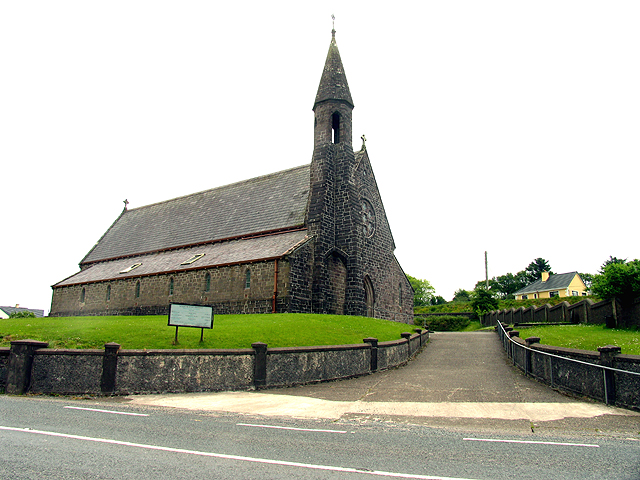

- Location in Ireland
- Coordinates: 52°08′29″N 10°09′47″W
- Country: Ireland
- Province: Munster
- County: County Kerry

Population (2006)
  - Urban: 768
- Irish Grid Reference: Q518011
- As this is a Gaeltacht village, the Irish Lios Póil is the only official name.

Lios Póil (anglicised as Lispole) is a Gaeltacht village in County Kerry, Ireland. It is on the Dingle Peninsula, 8 km east of the town of Dingle and 40 km west of Tralee on the N86 National Secondary Route.

== Transport ==
Bus Éireann services between Tralee and Dingle on the 275 route serve Lispole.

The Tralee and Dingle narrow gauge railway ran through Lispole, and a viaduct on the line still stands near the village. Lispole railway station opened on 1 April 1891, shut for passenger traffic on 17 April 1939, shut for goods traffic on 10 March 1947 and shut altogether on 1 July 1953.

== People ==
- Lispole is the birthplace of Joe Higgins, former Socialist Party TD for Dublin West and former MEP for the Dublin constituency.
- Kinard, Lispole is the birthplace of Irish Republican revolutionary Thomas Ashe (Irish: Tomás Ághas).
- Catherine Ashe, Gregory Peck's paternal grandmother, had ties to the area, which Peck frequently visited because of his family connections.
- Lispole is the birthplace of Paudie Fitzgerald, cyclist and businessman. Won the Rás Tailteann in 1956 and attempted to represent Ireland in the Melbourne Olympics the same year
- Sister Stan founder of the charity Focus Ireland was born and grew up in the townland of Rinn Bhuí in Lispole

== See also ==
- List of towns and villages in Ireland
