= R559 road (Ireland) =

Road in Ireland

R559 road
- Bóthar R559
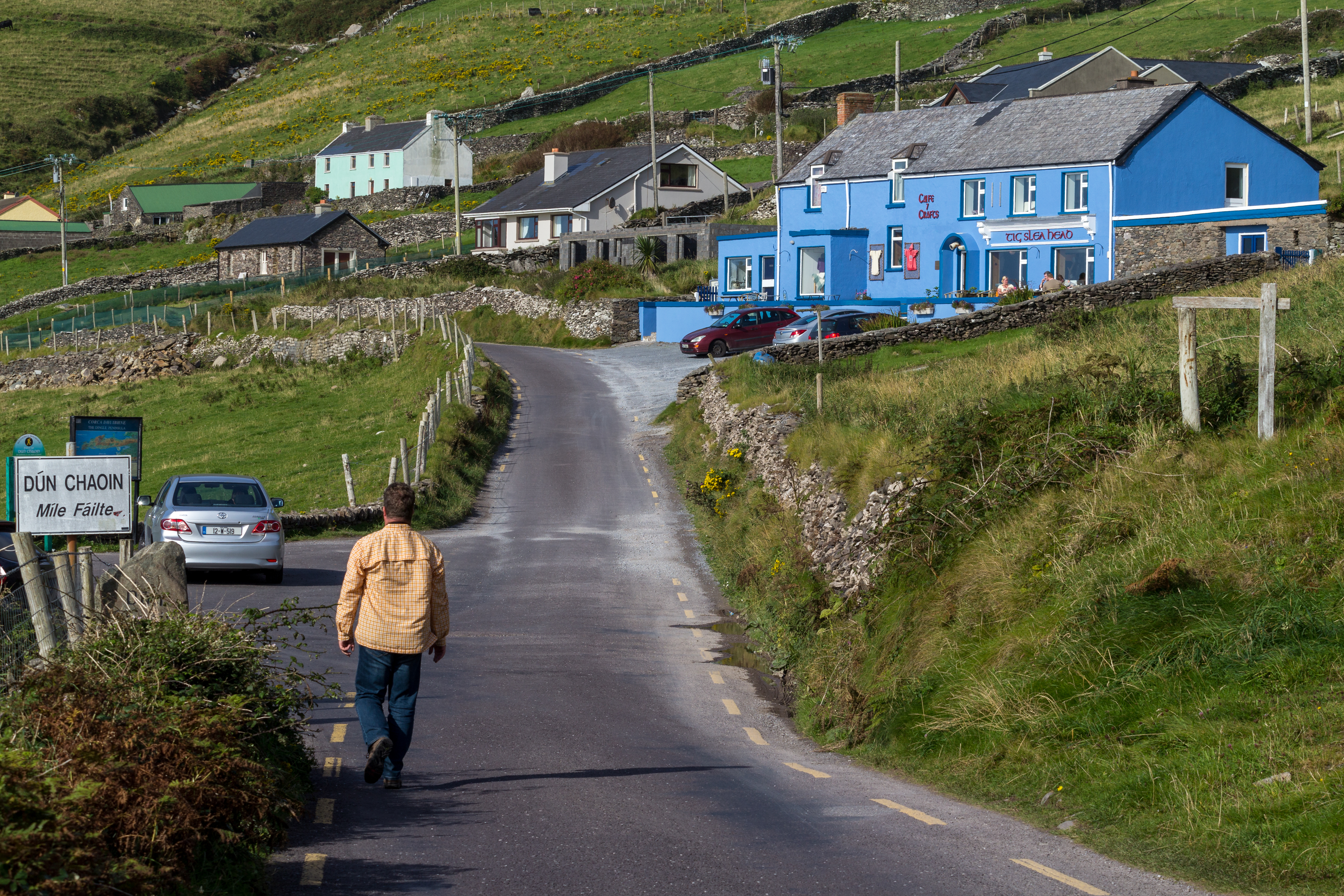
- Dunquin (Dún Chaoin) on the R559

Route information
- Length: 43.1 km (26.8 mi)

Location
- Country: Ireland
- Primary destinations: County Kerry; leaves the N86 at Dingle; Ventry; Coumeenoole; Dunquin; Terminates at the junction with the N86 at Dingle

Highway system
- Roads in Ireland; Motorways; Primary; Secondary; Regional

The R559 road is a regional road in Ireland which links various villages on Slea Head on the Dingle Peninsula with the town of Dingle and the N86 road. The road passes through a number of villages including Ventry, Coumeenoole, Dunquin and Dingle itself. The road is 43.1 km (26.8 mi) long.

== See also ==
- Roads in Ireland
- National primary road
- National secondary road
