= MV Ranga =

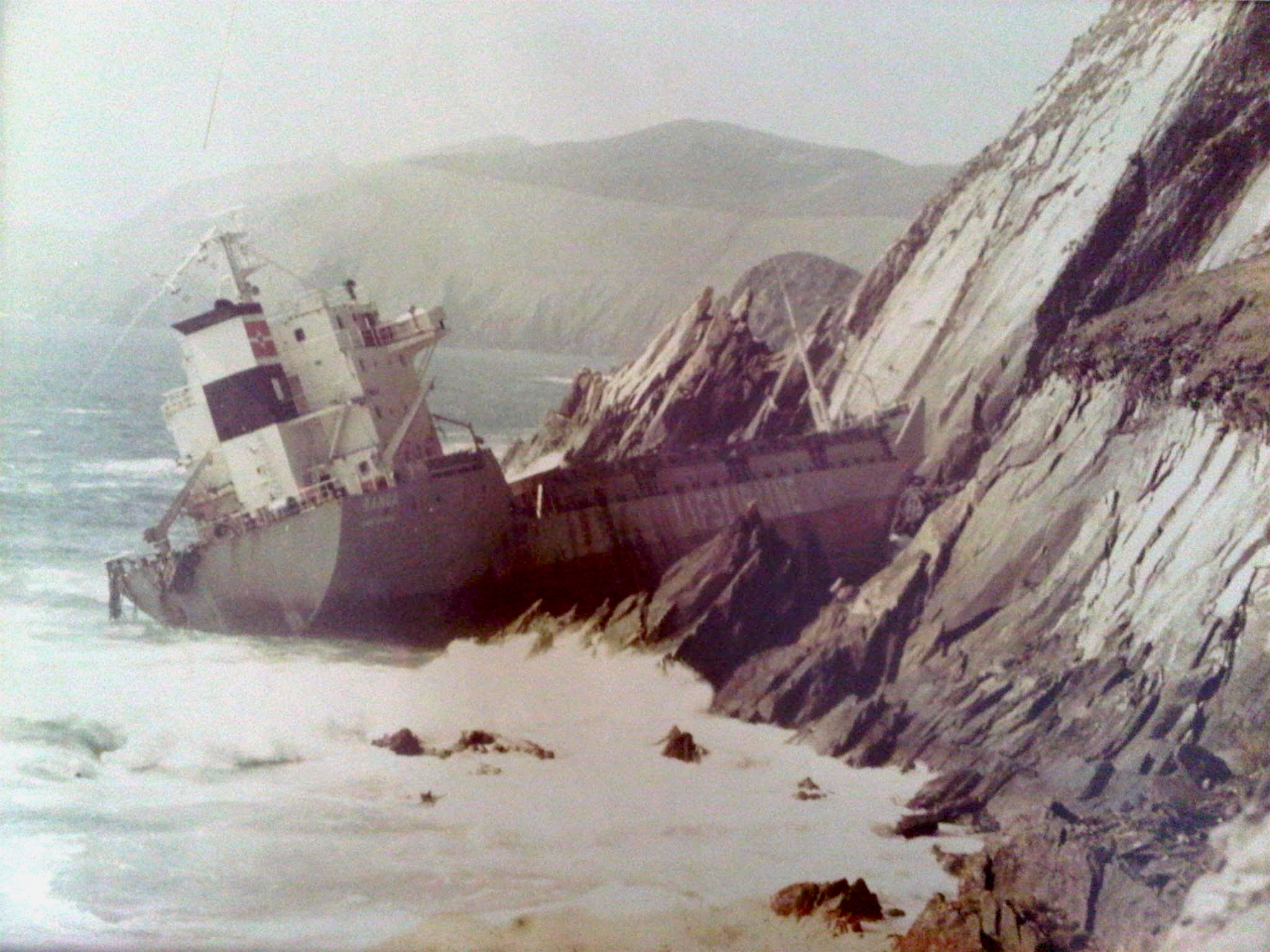
- The day after the shipwreck in March 1982

History

Flag of Spain
- Name: Ranga
- Namesake: The Eystri Rangá and the Ytri Rangá are rivers in Southern Iceland
- Owner: Naviera Ason SA
- Operator: Hafskip Line
- Port of registry: Santander
- Builder: Ast. Construcciones S.A.
- Launched: 19 December 1980
- Maiden voyage: March 1982
- Out of service: 1982
- Identification: IMO number: 7826013
- Fate: Wrecked at Dunmore Head, on the Dingle Peninsula, Kerry, Ireland in March 1982 after losing power during a storm and was a total loss.
- Notes: Named Berta de Perez originally, but her name was changed to Ranga when on charter to Hafskip Line

General characteristics
- Type: Container ship
- Tonnage: 1,586
- Length: 96.6m
- Beam: 15.0m
- Crew: 15

The motor ship Ranga was a 1,586 tonne container ship owned by the Spanish shipping company, Naviera Ason SA, but on charter to the Icelandic shipping company Hafskip. She was formerly named Berta de Perez, but her name was changed at sea to Ranga, due to the Icelandic charter. The Ranga was on her maiden voyage from Vigo to Reykjavík under Captain Miguel Ángel Díaz Madariaga when she was shipwrecked on the Irish coast.

The ship lost power on this voyage during a storm, and was wrecked at 52°6′33″N 10°28′6″W at Dunmore Head, close to Coumeenole Beach, near Slea Head on the Dingle peninsula, County Kerry, Ireland on 11 March 1982.

== Rescue ==
The local rescue team comprising members of Dingle Fire Brigade, the Garda Síochána, and emergency services, rescued some of the fifteen crew members by Breeches buoy. The remainder were taken off by an RAF helicopter. Captain Miguel Ángel Díaz Madariaga was the last to be rescued.

== Disposal ==
The ship was a total loss and created oil pollution as she broke up. The ship broke into two parts quickly, the stern of the ship, with the superstructure on, and the bows. In 1989, the company Eurosalve tried to scrap her, but this failed due to the inaccessibility of the wreck. The stern section of the wreck was removed in 1991, due to filming of Far and Away, which included a scene shot at Dunmore Head. Today, only the bow and some other scattered pieces of wreckage are still visible.

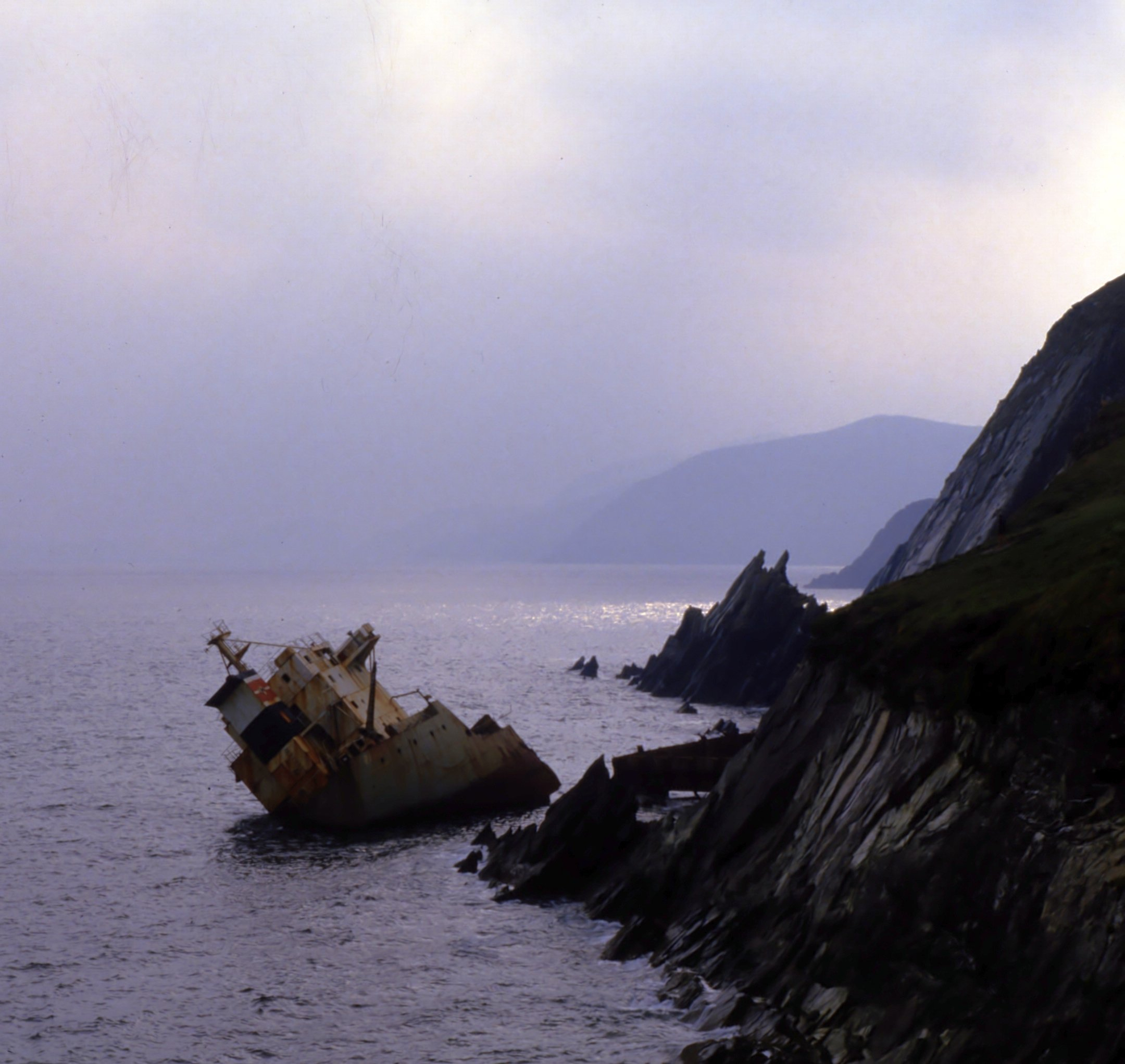
The remains of the Ranga in 1984

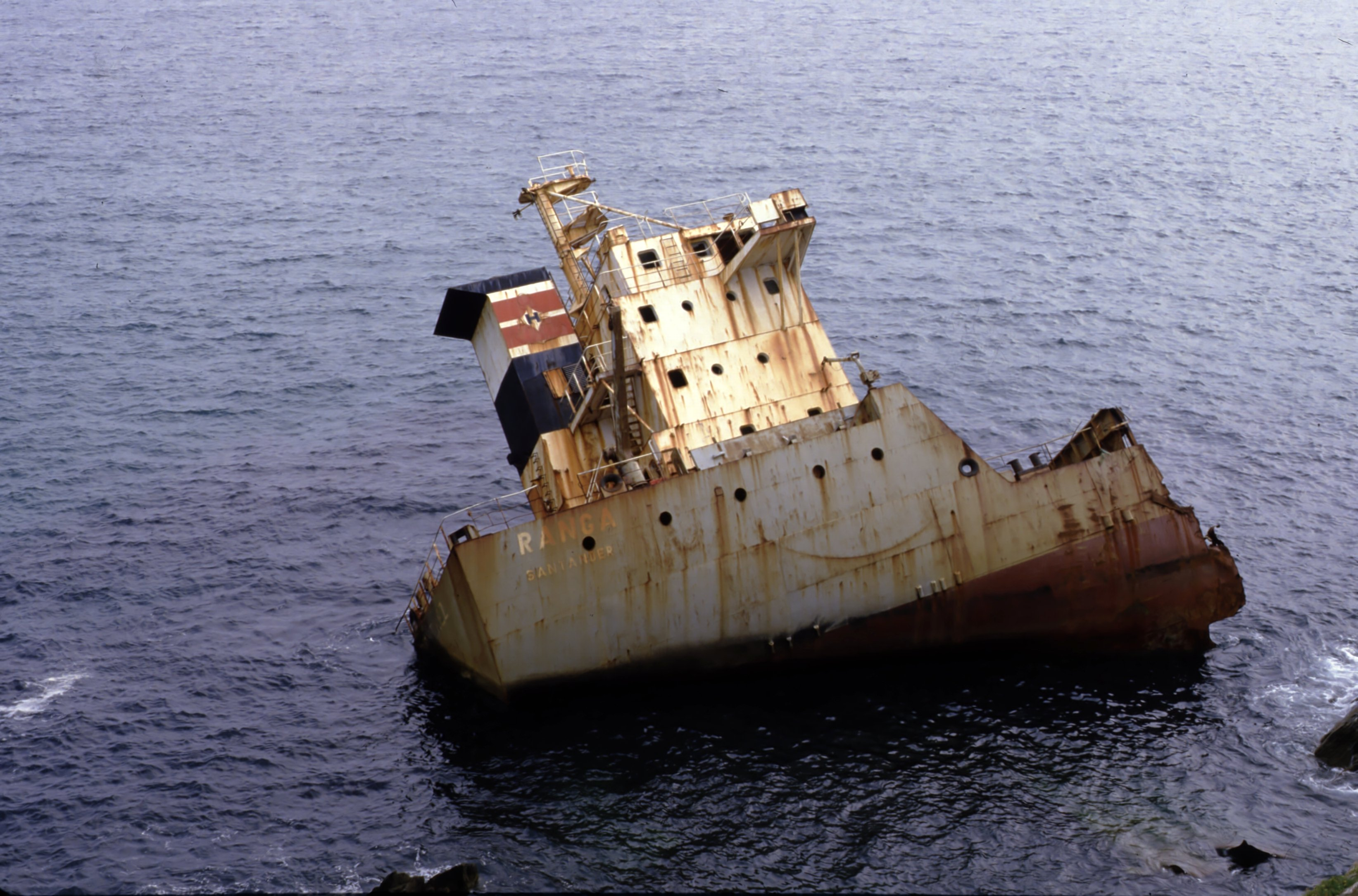
The remains of the Ranga in 1984

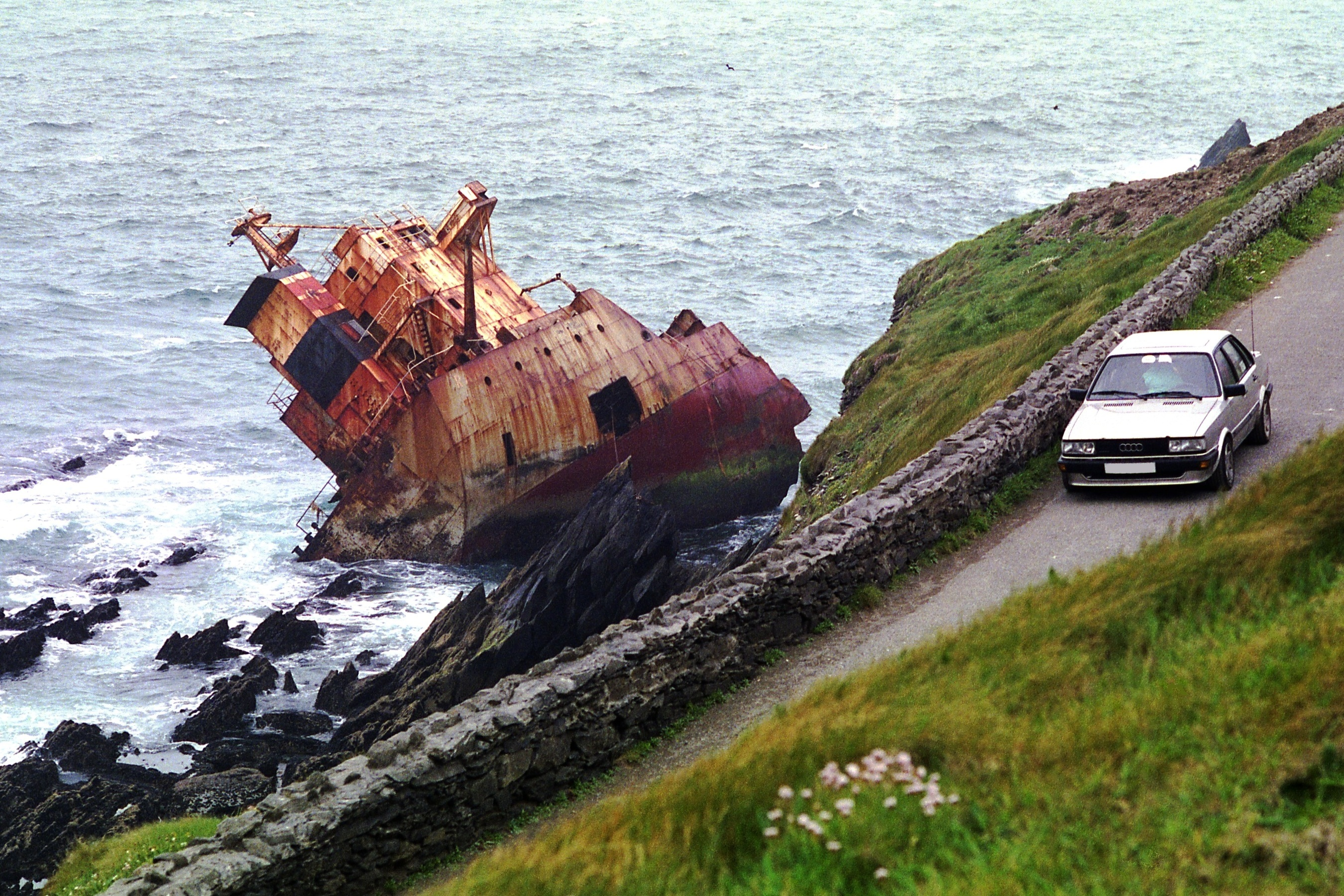
The MV Ranga remains pictured in 1986

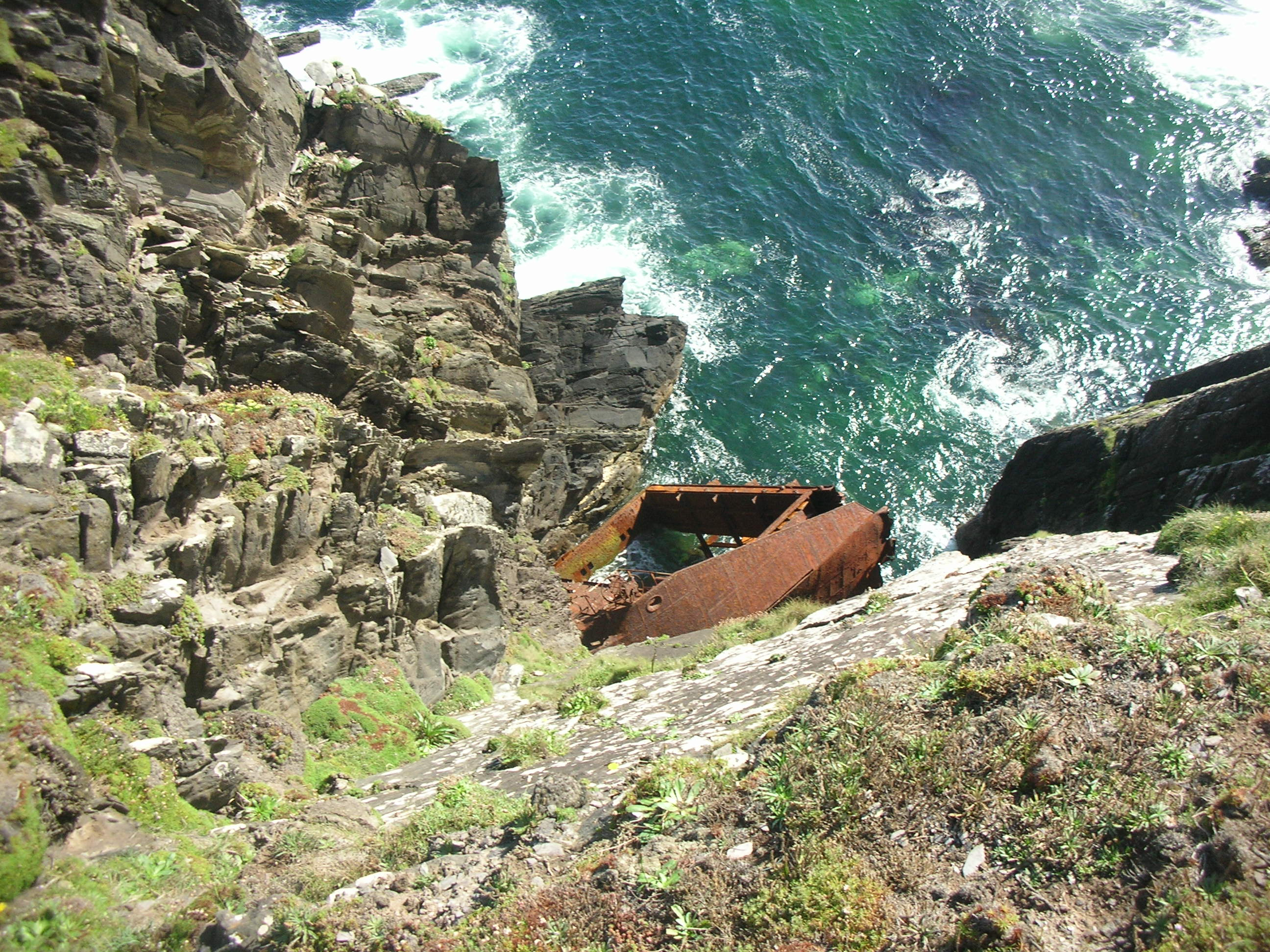
The bow section in 2006

The superstructure remains in 2006

== See also ==
- Dingle peninsula
- MV Plassy
