= N86 road (Ireland) =

Road in Ireland

N86 road
- Bóthar N86

Route information
- Length: 50.235 km (31.215 mi)

Location
- Country: Ireland
- Primary destinations: County Kerry; Tralee; Blennerville; Camp; Annascaul; Lispole; Dingle

Highway system
- Roads in Ireland; Motorways; Primary; Secondary; Regional

The N86 road is a national secondary road in County Kerry, Ireland. It runs from Tralee (Castlemaine Road Roundabout on the N22/N69 Tralee Bypass) to Dingle and passes through Annascaul and Lispole en route and passes by Gallaunmore. It is 50.235 kilometres (31.215 miles) in length. It has, in recent years, seen significant improvements to certain stretches of road.
