= Dingle Peninsula =

Peninsula in County Kerry, Ireland

Coordinates: 52°11′36″N 10°05′02″W

Corca Dhuibhne
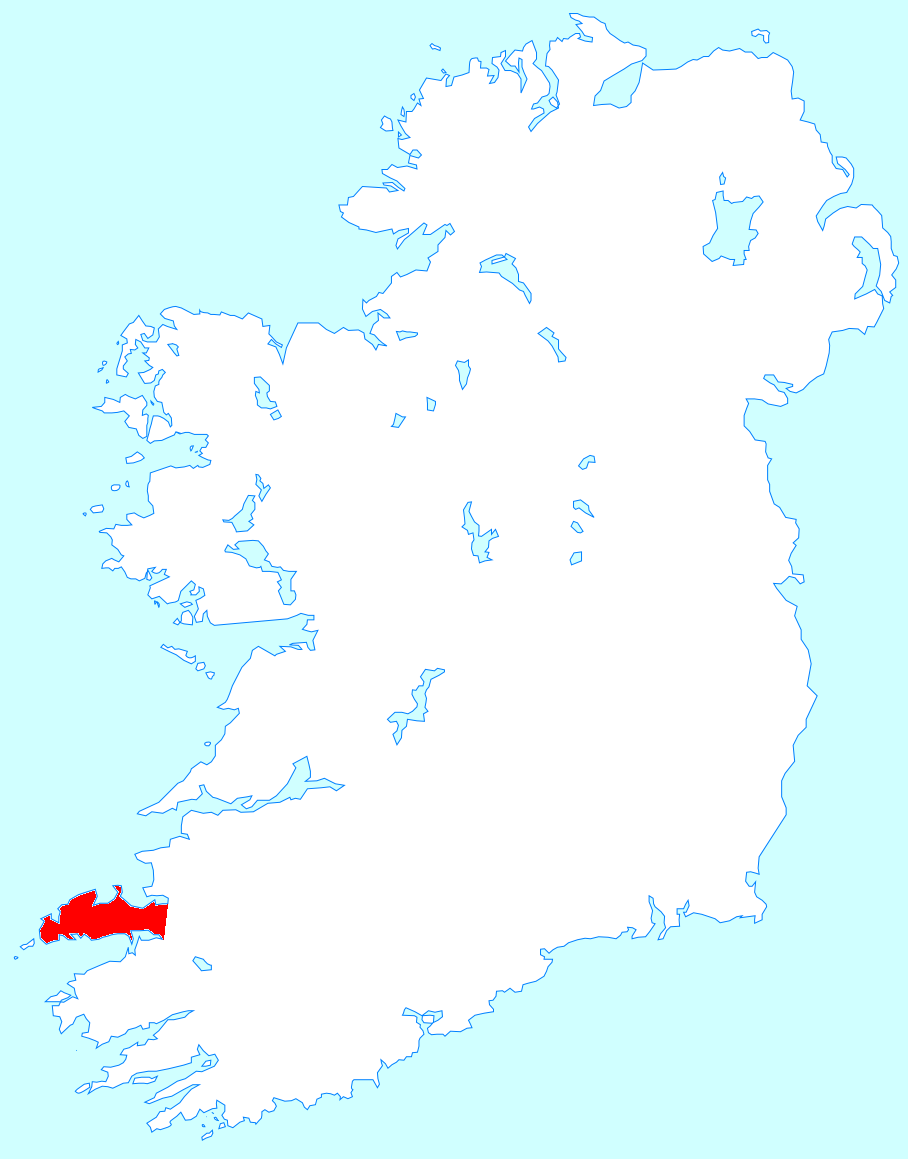
- Location of the Dingle Peninsula
- Interactive map of Dingle Peninsula

Geography
- Location: Ireland
- Adjacent to: Atlantic Ocean
- Area: 583 km^{2} (225 sq mi)
- Highest elevation: 952 m (3123 ft)
- Highest point: Mount Brandon

Administration
- Ireland
- County: Kerry
- County council: 3 seats

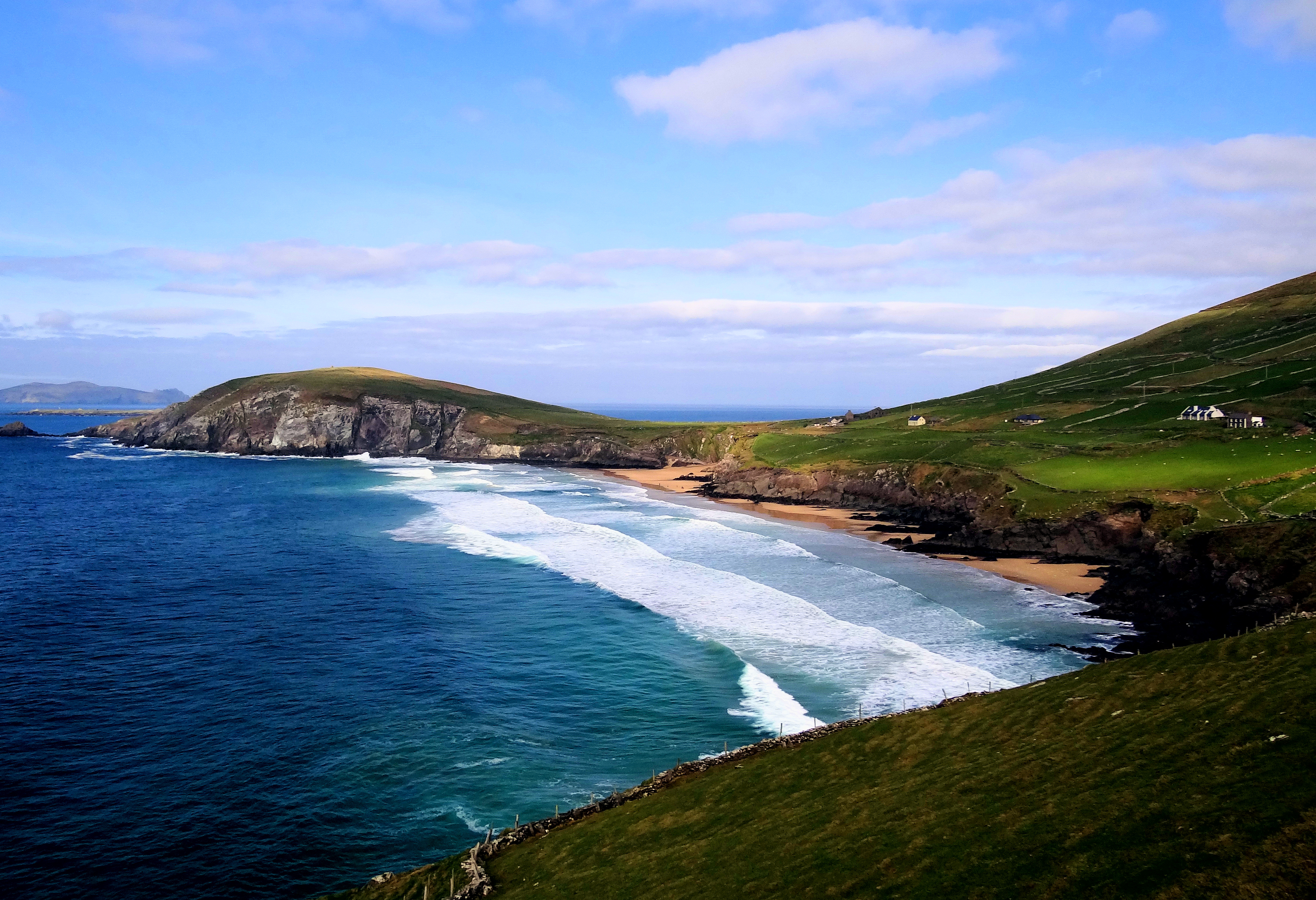
Dunmore Head, the westernmost point on the Dingle Peninsula

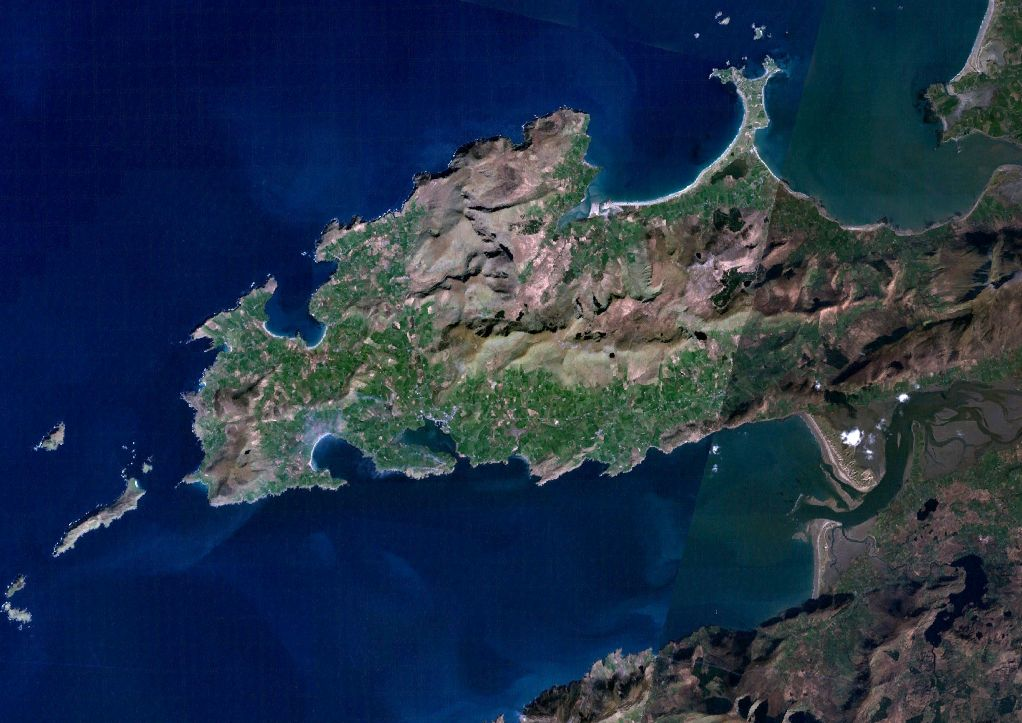
NASA satellite image of the Dingle Peninsula

The Dingle Peninsula (Irish: Corca Dhuibhne; anglicised as Corkaguiny or Corcaguiny, the name of the corresponding barony) is the northernmost of the major peninsulas in County Kerry. It ends beyond the town of Dingle at Dunmore Head, the westernmost point of mainland Ireland. It is separated from the Iveragh Peninsula to the south by the Dingle Bay.

== Name ==
The Dingle Peninsula is named after the town of Dingle. The peninsula is also commonly called Corca Dhuibhne (Corcu Duibne) even when those referring to it are speaking in English. Corca Dhuibhne, which means "seed or tribe of Duibhne" (a Goddess from Irish mythology and an Irish clan name), refers to the túath (people, nation) of Corco Dhuibhne who occupied the peninsula in the Middle Ages and who also held a number of territories in the south and east of County Kerry.

== Geography ==
The peninsula exists because of the band of sandstone rock that forms the Slieve Mish mountain range at the neck of the peninsula, in the east, and the Brandon Group of mountains, and the Mountains of the Central Dingle Peninsula further to the west. Ireland's highest mountain outside MacGillycuddy's Reeks, Mount Brandon at 951 m, forms part of a high ridge with views over the peninsula and North Kerry.

Conor Pass, which runs from Dingle on the south-western end of the peninsula towards Brandon Bay and Castlegregory in the north-east, is the highest mountain pass in Ireland, weaving around the sharp cliff faces and past the high corrie lakes.

The Blasket Islands lie off the west coast. They are known for the literary and linguistic heritage of the former inhabitants. However, these remote islands have been uninhabited since the 1950s following an evacuation.

== Culture, literature, and language ==
The western end of the peninsula is a Gaeltacht (Irish-speaking area) that has produced and heavily influenced a number of storytellers, poets, and writers highly important to Modern literature in Irish; Piaras Feiritéar, Máire Mhac an tSaoi, Pádraig Ó Siochfhradha, Cáit Feiritéar, and Peig Sayers among others. This is the westernmost part of Ireland, and the village of Dún Chaoin is often jokingly referred to as "the next parish to America."

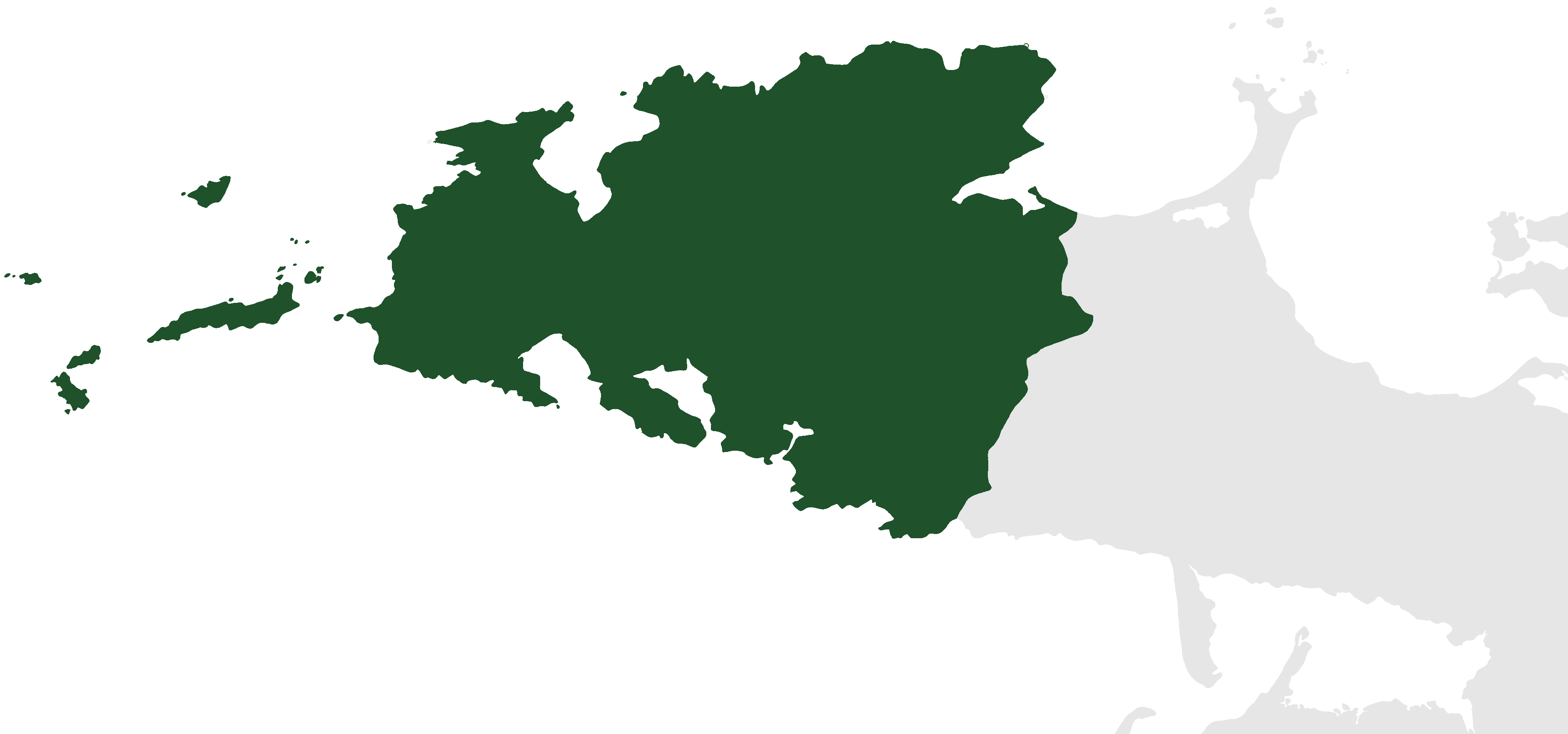
The Gaeltacht of the Dingle peninsula, highlighted in green.

Although he greatly admired the post-Irish War of Independence Gaeltacht memoirs from Corca Dhuibhne and the surrounding islands, and particularly the memoirs of Great Blasket Island seanchaithe Tomás Ó Criomhthain, novelist Flann O'Brien also chose to satirize their cliches quite mercilessly in his modernist novel An Béal Bocht ("The Poor Mouth"), which is set in the fictional, desperately poor, and constantly raining Gaeltacht of Corca Dhorcha, a parody of Corca Dhuibhne.

Muireann Nic Amhlaoibh, award-winning seán-nos singer and performer of Irish traditional music, was born in the Aran Islands, but grew up in Dún Chaoin. Nic Amhlaoibh has both performed and recorded Irish language songs from Corca Dhuibhne, including at least one song composed upon the nearby Great Blasket Island.

== Archaeology ==
The peninsula is the location of numerous prehistoric and early medieval remains including:

- Glanfahan, site of ancient dry-stone huts (clocháns)
- Caherdorgan North, with medieval stone buildings
- Ballywiheen, containing an ancient stone fort and monastic settlement
- Kilmalkedar, monastic settlement with Ogham stone
- Ferriter's Cove, at the western tip of the peninsula; and
- Gallarus Oratory in the very west of the peninsula near the village of Baile an Fheirtéaraigh in Ard na Caithne.

Músaem Chorca Dhuibhne, situated in the village of Baile an Fheirtéaraigh (Ballyferriter) has exhibitions detailing the archaeology and history of the peninsula. Some of the exhibitions include Ogham stones, artefacts from the excavations at the nearby monastic site of Riasc (Reask) and objects on loan from the National Museum of Ireland.

In April 2021, Irish archaeologists from the National Monuments Service and Ireland's National Museum announced the discovery of an untouched Bronze Age grave, skeletal remains, fragments of human bone and a large semicircular slab in the underground passageway. Archaeologist Mr Ó Coileáin reported: "We think this may have been a ritual site with an element of burial in it and this could be one of those. This looks like it is a chambered tomb from the prehistoric period which might have been a significant marker on the landscape".

== Places of interest ==
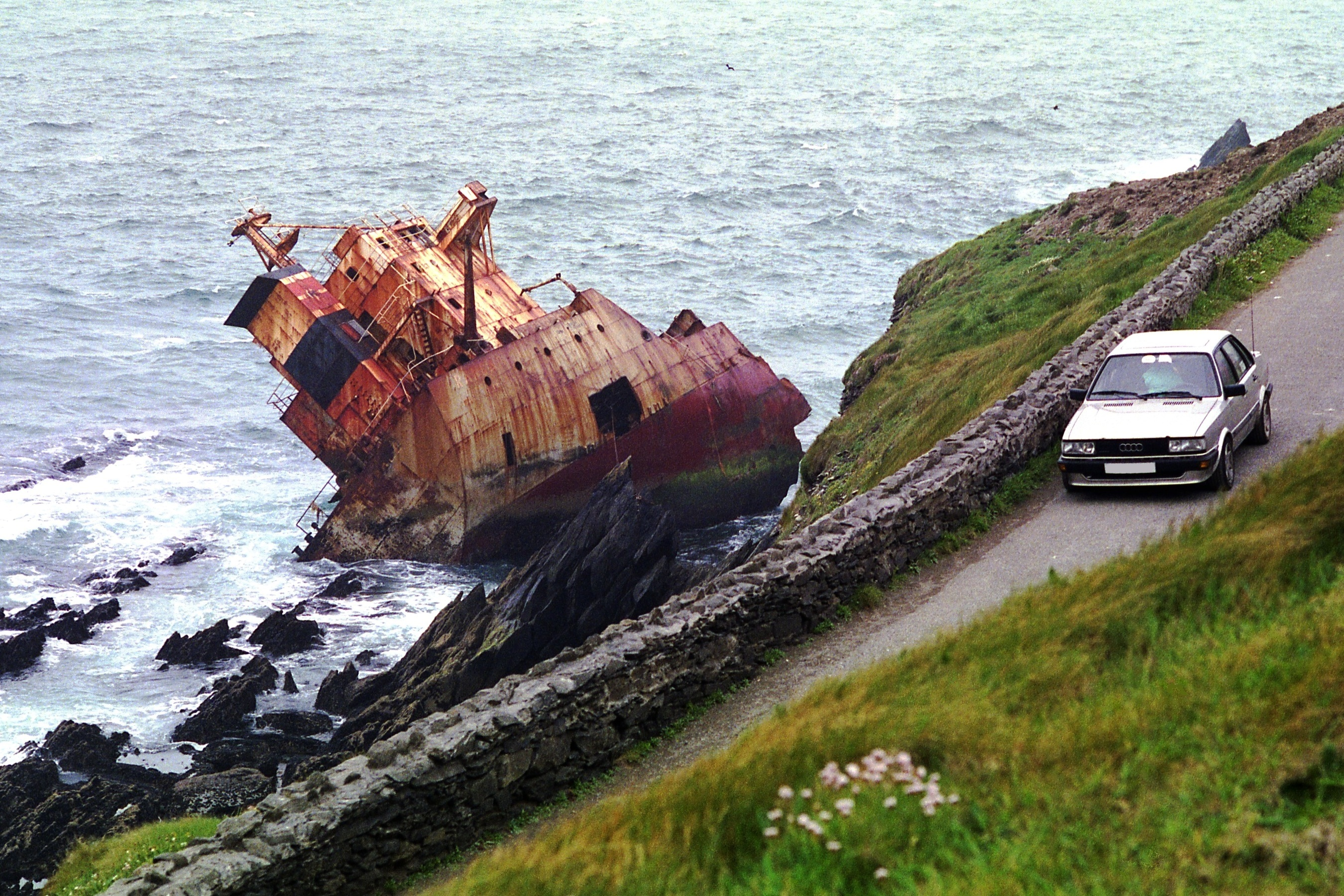
The Ranga, here pictured in 1986

The peninsula is known for the MV Ranga, a Spanish cargo vessel that wrecked on the coast in 1982.

Gallaunmore is a standing stone and National Monument.

Rahinnane Castle is a 15th-century castle built on a medieval ringfort.

Slieveglass, an area of high ground near the village of Brandon, was the site of Ireland's first fatal airliner accident. On 28 July 1943, a BOAC Short S.25 Sunderland III, G-AGES, crashed at 2,000 feet while descending into Foynes in fog, killing 10 of the 25 onboard.

== In film ==
David Lean's 1970 film Ryan's Daughter takes place at a village on the Dingle Peninsula in the immediate aftermath of the 1916 Easter Rising, and was partly shot on location near Dún Chaoin, Coumeenole Beach, Slea Head and Inch Strand. Far and Away, a 1992 film directed by Ron Howard, was partly filmed on the peninsula.

The film Leap Year is partly set in the Dingle Peninsula, but none of the filming took place in the area.

Several local areas were used for filming of Star Wars: The Last Jedi including Dunmore Head and Slea Head where a replica of the clochán huts of Skellig Michael were built.

== In music ==
Dingle is mentioned in Phil Colclough and June Colclough's "Song for Ireland."

== Gallery ==
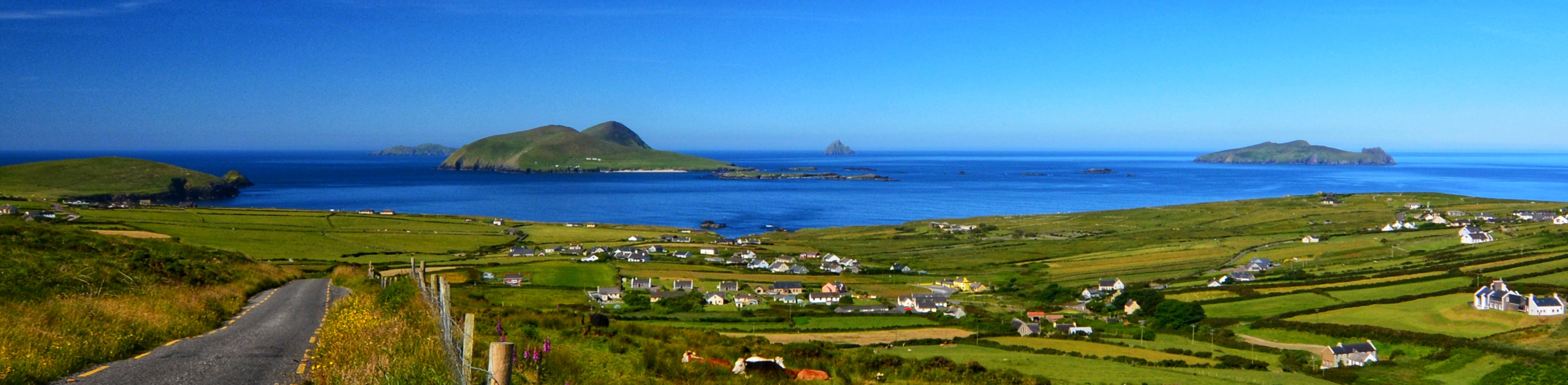
A panoramic view of the western end of the Dingle Peninsula.
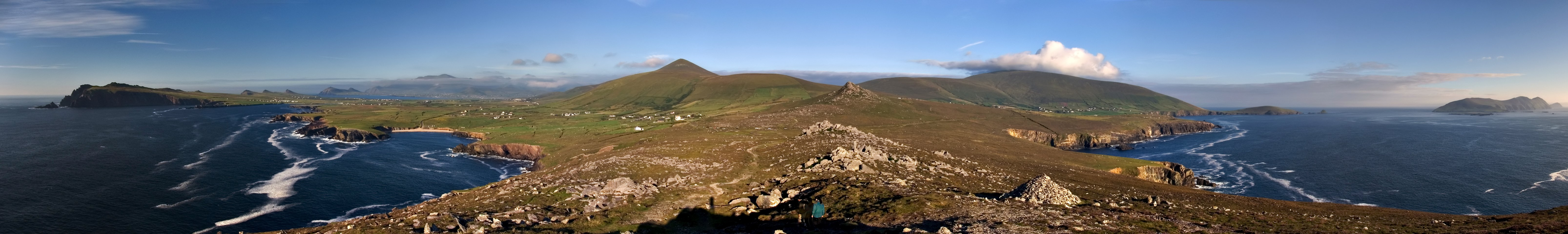
A panoramic view of the Dingle Peninsula.
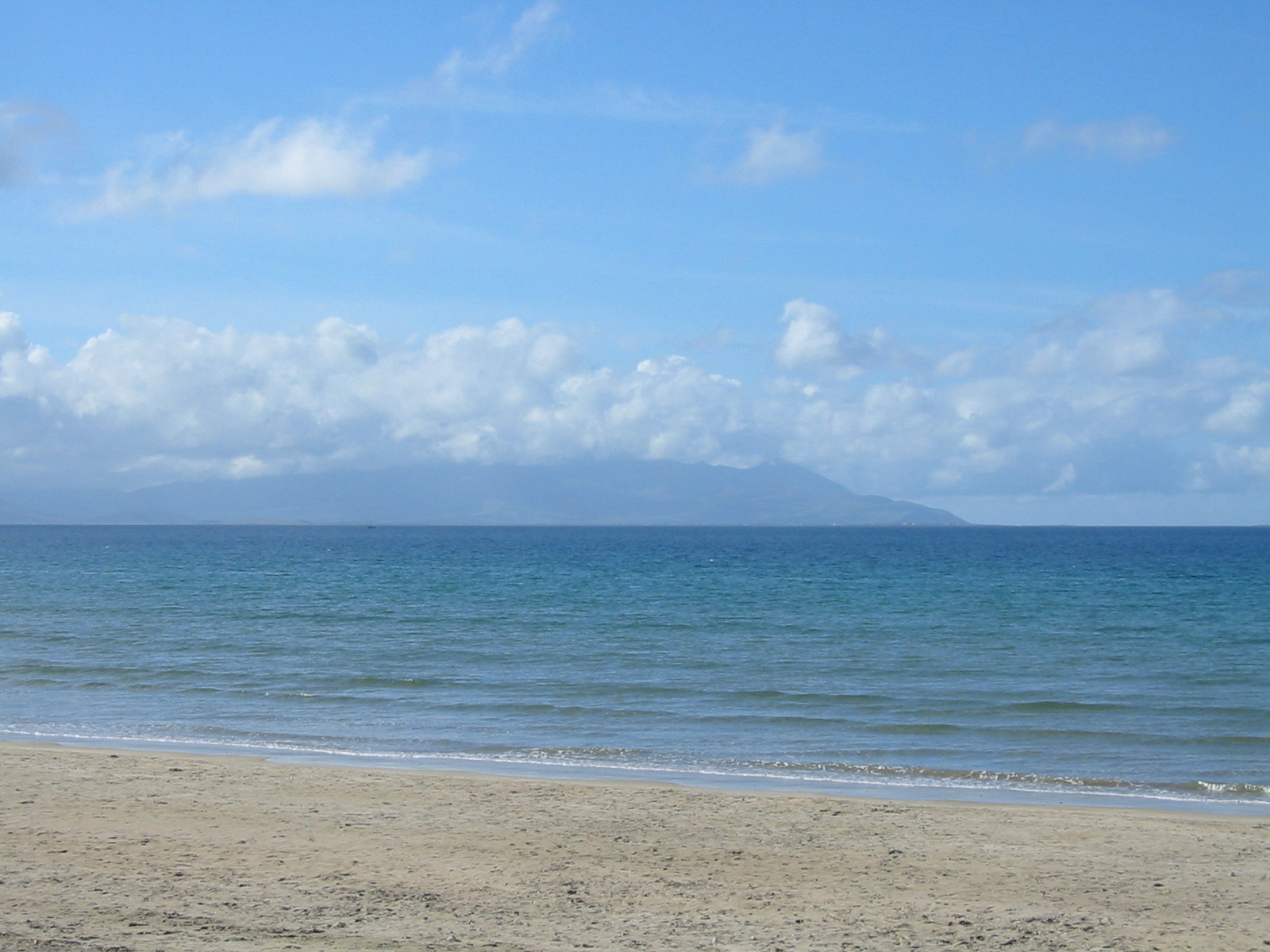
The Dingle Peninsula as viewed from Banna Strand.

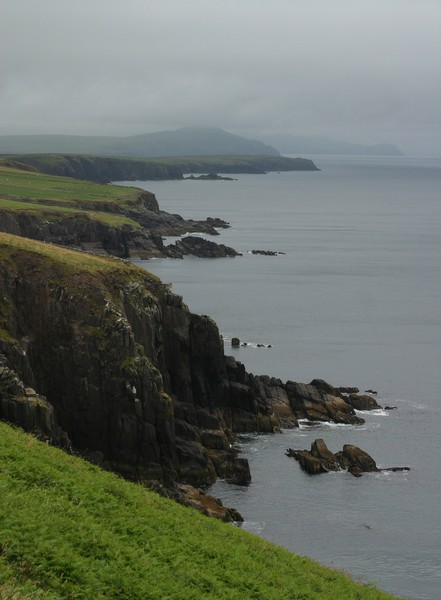
Dingle Peninsula coastline.

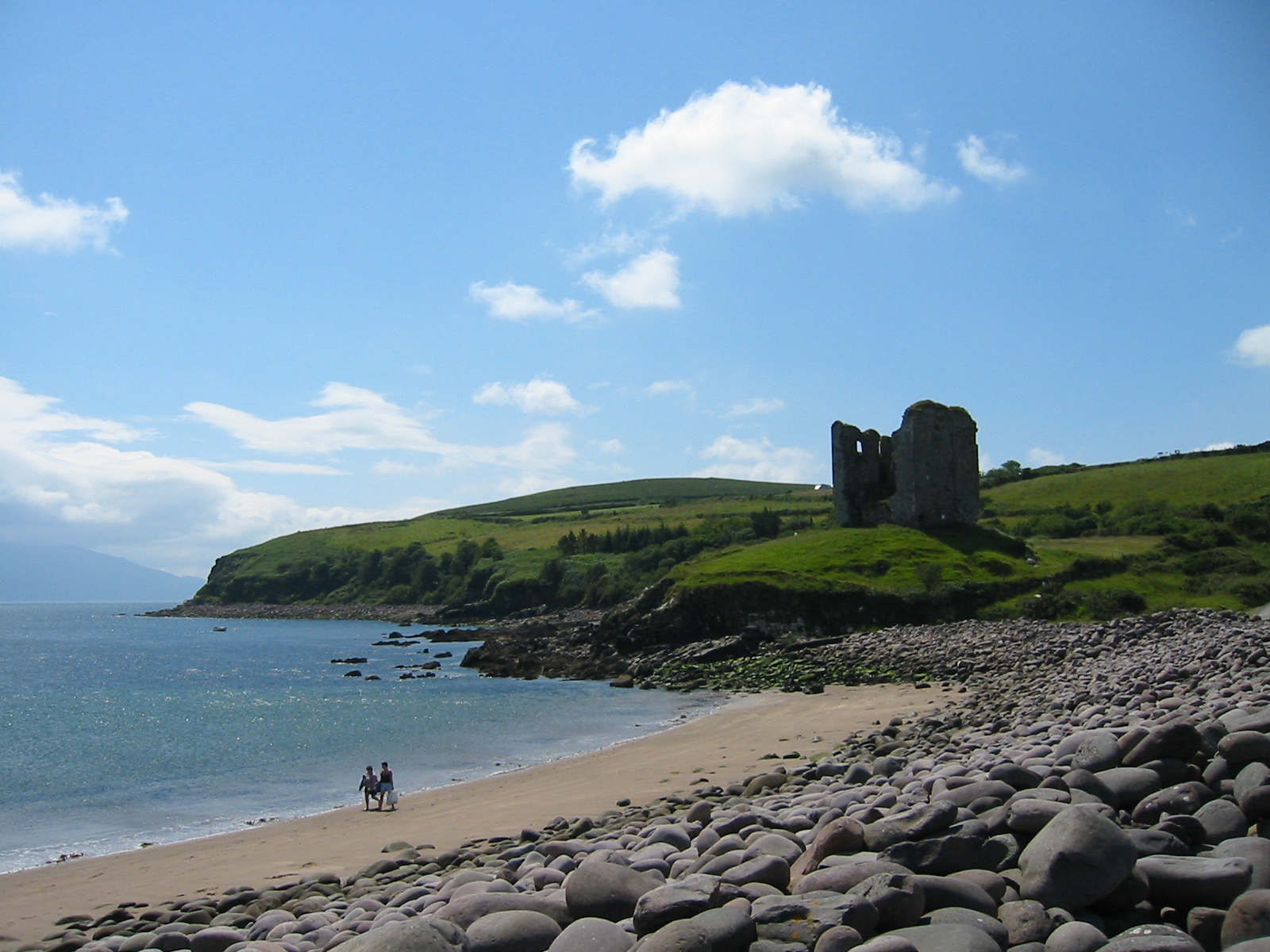
Minard Castle, Lispole, County Kerry.

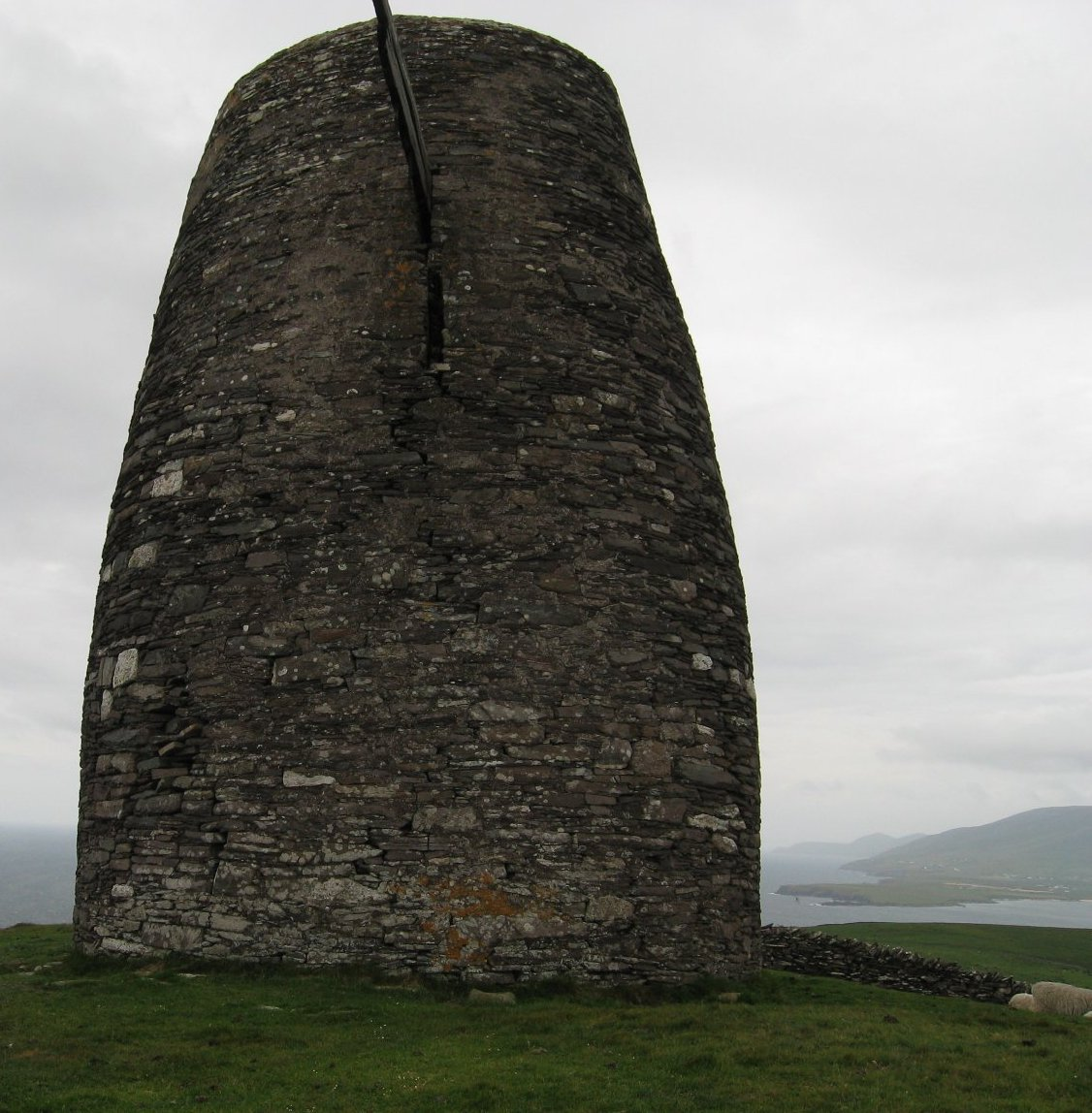
Eask Tower, with the tip of the Ring of Kerry in the background.

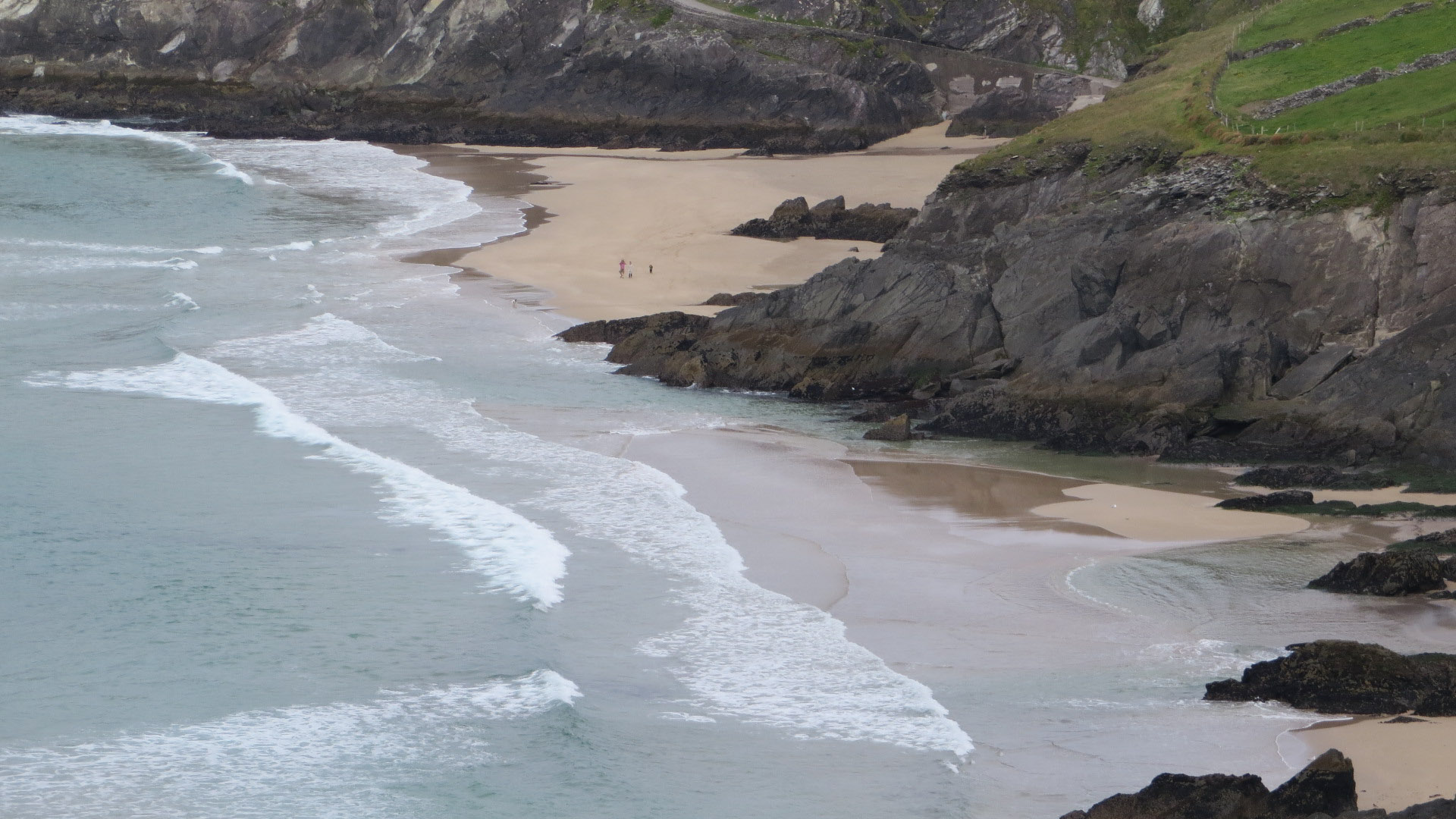
Beaches near Dunmore Head.

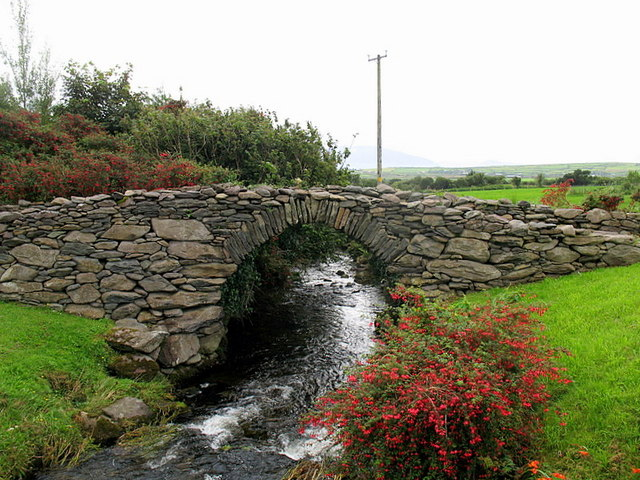
Garfinny Bridge, medieval bridge and National Monument

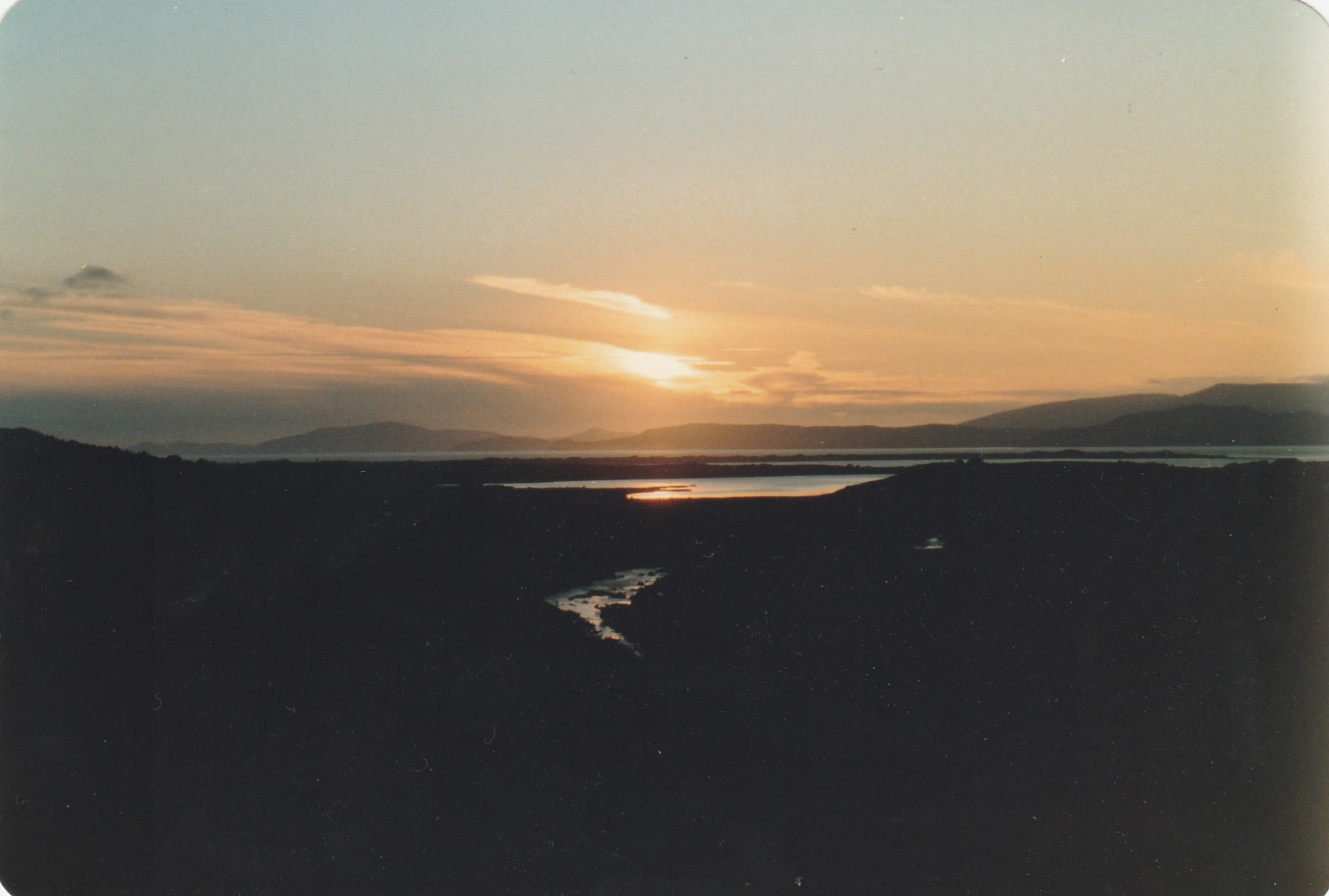
Sunset over the Dingle Peninsula, as seen from hills on the Iveragh Peninsula, 1987

== See also ==
- Beara Peninsula
- Eask tower
- Iveragh Peninsula
- Mount Brandon
- Munster Irish
- Song for Ireland
