= Surfing in Ireland =

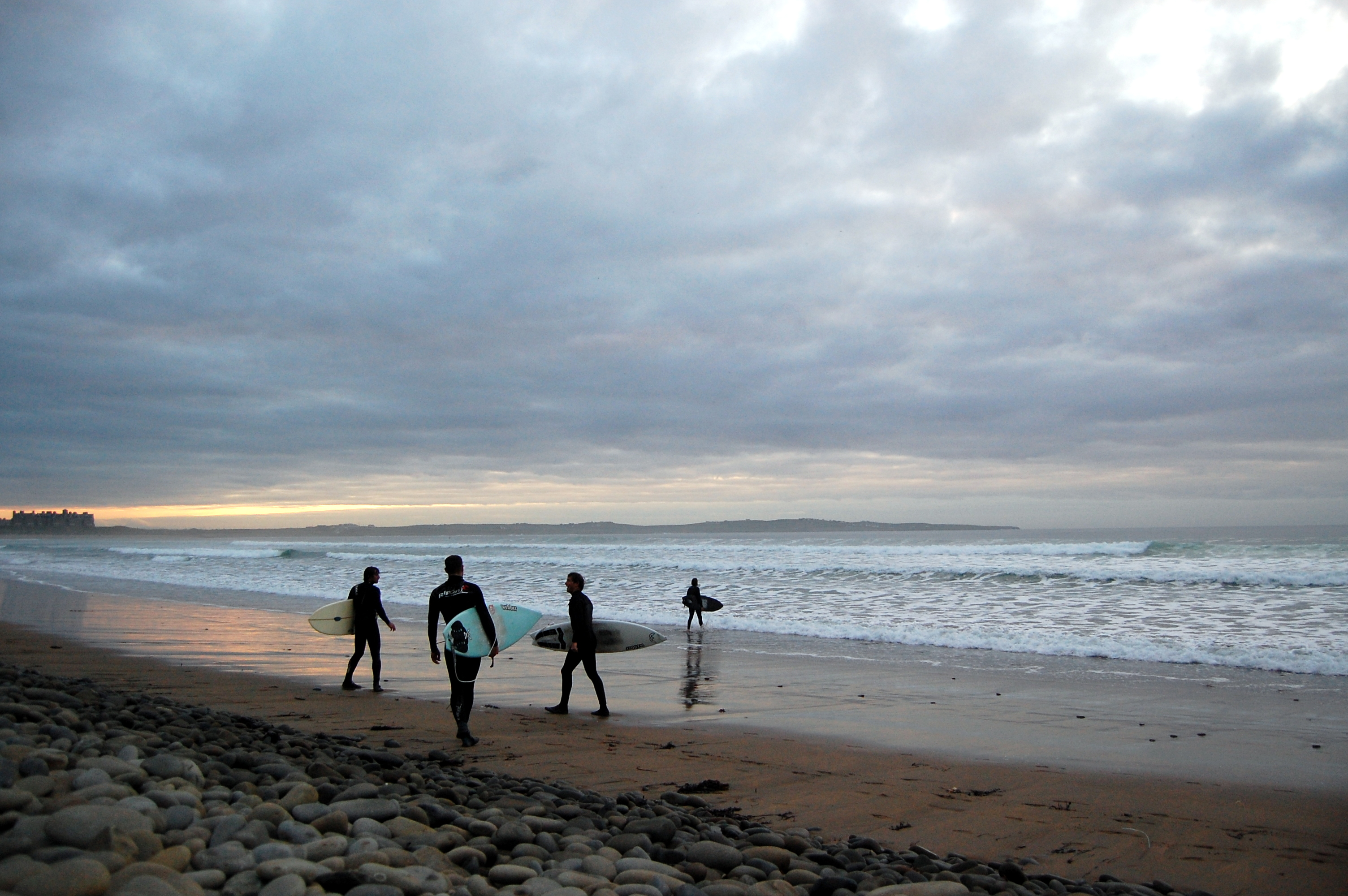
- Surfers on Doughmore Beach, County Clare
- Country: Republic of Ireland; Northern Ireland
- Governing body: Irish Surfing Association
- National team(s): Irish Surf Team
- Clubs: 16

National competitions
- Irish National Surfing Championships

Club competitions
- Irish Inter County Surfing Championships

International competitions
- European Surfing Championships; World Surfing Championships

Ireland has become increasingly popular as a surfing destination, due to its exposed location on the turbulent Atlantic seaboard.

The island has 3,172 kilometers of coastline, and the southern and western shores are exposed for waves originating in the North Atlantic. Although Ireland is located at a high latitude, the warm ocean currents of the North Atlantic drift ensures mild water temperatures throughout the year, with a minimum of 10 °C (50 °F) in winter and a maximum of 21 °C (70 °F) in summer.

The numerous beaches, reefs, headlands and coves along the west coast of Ireland serve as popular surf spots. Ireland has played host to international events since the 1960s, and is home to many surf shops, schools and clubs.

== History ==
Surfing has been documented in Ireland as early as 1949, however it was not until 1964 that the "Bray Island Surf Club" was founded. Ireland was first represented at the World Surfing Championship in 1966 by Kevin Cavey, which in turn inspired the first Irish National Surfing Championships, held in Tramore, County Waterford in 1967. The first Irish Inter County Surfing Championships was held in 1968, followed by a full Irish team entry in the inaugural European Surfing Championships of 1969.

The growing interest in competition surfing mirrored a general interest in surfing across the island, with the number of participants and clubs growing rapidly throughout the late 60s; by 1970, there were an estimated 400 surfers in the country. This led to the foundation of the Irish Surfing Association in that year.

== Governing body ==
Irish Surfing, also known as the Irish Surfing Association, is a voluntary organisation that governs the sport of surfing on the island of Ireland. It participates in club development, instructor training and surf school regulation, and promoting surfing safety and the protection of the environment, as well as overseeing competitive surfing in Ireland.

=== Clubs ===
There are 16 surf clubs accredited by the Irish Surfing Association.

- Bundoran Board Riders Club (Bundoran, County Donegal)
- Causeway Coast Surf Club (Portstewart, County Londonderry)
- County Sligo Surf Club (Strandhill, County Sligo)
- Curracloe Surf Club (Curracloe, County Wexford)
- Easkey Surf Club (Easkey, County Sligo)
- East Coast Surf Club (County Dublin)
- GTown Surf Club (Kinsale, County Cork)
- Irish Soul Surfers Network (Ballyshannon, County Donegal)
- Kerry Surf Club (County Kerry)
- Killiney Surf Club (Killiney, County Dublin)
- Laois Surf Club (Portlaoise, County Laois)
- Liquid Therapy (Bundoran, County Donegal)
- North Sligo Surf Club (Strandhill, County Sligo)
- Rossnowlagh Surf Club (Rossnowlagh, County Donegal)
- TBay Surf Club (Tramore, County Waterford)
- West Coast Surf Club (Milltown Malbay, County Clare)

There are also many unaccredited surf clubs throughout the country.

=== Competitions ===
The two most important annual events in the Irish surfing calendar are the Irish National Surfing Championships, held in Bundoran, County Donegal, and the Irish Inter County Surfing Championships, held in Rossnowlagh, County Donegal.

Ireland has frequently hosted international competitions, including the Smirnoff International (Easky, 1979), the European Surfing Championships (Lahinch, 1972; Rossnowlagh, 1985; Bundoran, 1997 & 2011) and the Billabong Monster Tow In Surf Session (Mullaghmore 2011, 2012/13).

== Culture ==
Although surfing is not universally associated with Ireland, there is a growing surfing subculture to accommodate the increased interest in the sport. There have been a number of surfing documentaries filmed on the island (including the acclaimed 2008 documentary, Waveriders), as well as annual surf music festivals and a surf film festival. The Mullaghmore Head famously known as "The Irish Beast" is a well known big wave that breaks between Grange and Cliffoney, 400 meters northwest of the village of Mullaghmore in County Sligo. It is known as one of the most challenging big waves in the world.

== Demographics ==
Ireland has an estimated 20,000 resident surfers. In addition, the country is an increasingly popular destination for surfing tourists.

== Locations ==
List of surf spots
Name of spot	Location	County	Break Direction	Break Type	Difficulty
Ballycastle Beach	Ballycastle	County Antrim	Right and left	Beach-break	All surfers
East Strand	Portrush	County Antrim	Left	Beach-break	Experienced surfers
Finn's Left	Ballintoy	County Antrim	Right	Point-break	Experienced surfers
Portballintrae	Portballintrae	County Antrim	Right and left	Beach-break	All surfers
Portrush	Portrush	County Antrim	Right and left	Beach-break	All surfers
West Strand	Portrush	County Antrim	Right and left	Beach-break	All surfers
White Rocks	Portrush	County Antrim	Right and left	Beach-break	All surfers
Castlerock	Castlerock	County Londonderry	Left	Rivermouth	Experienced surfers
Castlerock Beach	Castlerock	County Londonderry	Right and left	Beach-break	All surfers
Portstewart	Portstewart	County Londonderry	Right and left	Beach-break	All surfers
Ballyheirnan Bay	Fanad	County Donegal	Right and left	Beach-break	All surfers
Ballymastocker	Portsalon	County Donegal	Right and left	Beach-break	All surfers
Black spot	Bundoran	County Donegal	Right and left	Reef-rocky	Experienced surfers
Bloody foreland	Brinlack	County Donegal	Right	Point-break	Experienced surfers
Bundoran	Bundoran	County Donegal	Right and left	Reef-rocky	Experienced surfers
Drumnacraig	North of Portsalon	County Donegal	Right and left	Beach-break	Experienced surfers
Falcarragh Beach	Falcarragh	County Donegal	Right and left	Beach-break	All surfers
Loughros Point	Ardara	County Donegal	Left	Rivermouth	Experienced surfers
Maghera Beach	Ardara	County Donegal	Right and left	Beach-break	All surfers
Pampa	Bundoran	County Donegal	Left	Reef-rocky	Experienced surfers
Rossnowlagh	Rossnowlagh	County Donegal	Right and left	Beach-break	All surfers
Tullan Strand	Ballyshannon	County Donegal	Right	Beach-break	All surfers
Tullaghan (left)	Tullaghan	County Leitrim	Left	Point-break	Experienced surfers
Tullaghan (right)	Tullaghan	County Leitrim	Right	Point-break	Experienced surfers
Bay Break	Strandhill	County Sligo	Left	Reef-rocky	All surfers
Dunmoran	near Skreen	County Sligo	Right and left	Beach-break	All surfers
Easky	Easky	County Sligo	Left	Reef-rocky	All surfers
Easky (right)	Easky	County Sligo	Right	Point-break	All surfers
Gaa	Enniscrone	County Sligo	Left	Point-break	Experienced surfers
Inishcrone	Enniscrone	County Sligo	Right	Reef-rocky	Experienced surfers
Lislary	near Ocean Heights B&B	County Sligo	Right and left	Reef-rocky	All surfers
Mullaghmore	Mullaghmore	County Sligo	Left	Reef-rocky	Pros or kamikaze only...
Strandhill	Strandhill	County Sligo	Right and left	Beach-break	All surfers
Carrownisky	near Louisburgh	County Mayo	Right and left	Beach-break	All surfers
Dugort	Achill Island (North)	County Mayo	Right and left	Beach-break	All surfers
Keel Beach	Achill Island (South)	County Mayo	Right and left	Beach-break	All surfers
Keel Strand	Achill Island (South)	County Mayo	Right and left	Beach-break	All surfers
Kilcummin	Ballycastle	County Mayo	Left	Reef-rocky	Experienced surfers
Killadoon	beside Cross Lough	County Mayo	Right and left	Beach-break	All surfers
Doonloughin	~4 km WNW of Ballyconneely	County Galway	Right and left	Beach-break	All surfers
Aileens	off Cliffs of Moher	County Clare	Right	Reef-rocky	Pros or kamikaze only...
Barrtrá	Lahinch	County Clare	Left	Point-break	All surfers
Crab Island	Doolin	County Clare	Right	Reef-rocky	Experienced surfers
Cream Point	off Milltown Malbay	County Clare	Right and left	Reef-rocky	Pros or kamikaze only...
Doolin Point	Doolin	County Clare	Right	Reef-rocky	Experienced surfers
Doonbeg Castle	Doonbeg	County Clare	Left	Reef-rocky	All surfers
Doughmore Beach	Doonbeg	County Clare	Left	Reef-rocky	All surfers
Fanore	Fanore	County Clare	Right and left	Beach-break	Beginners wave
Killard	near Doonbeg	County Clare	Right and left	Beach-break	All surfers
Lahinch Beach	Lahinch	County Clare	Right and left	Beach-break	All surfers
Lahinch (Left)	Lahinch	County Clare	Left	Point-break	Experienced surfers
Spanish Point Beach	Spanish Point	County Clare	Right and left	Beach-break	Beginners wave
Spanish Point Reefs	Spanish Point	County Clare	Right	Point-break	Experienced surfers
Ardkeragh	Waterville	County Kerry	Left	Point-break	Experienced surfers
Ballinskelligs	Waterville	County Kerry	Right and left	Beach-break	Beginners wave
Ballybunion	Ballybunion	County Kerry	Right	Beach-break	All surfers
Ballyheigue	Ballyheigue	County Kerry	Right and left	Reef-rocky	Experienced surfers
Banna Strand	Banna Strand	County Kerry	Right and left	Sand-bar	Experienced surfers
Baslicon	Waterville	County Kerry	Right	Point-break	Experienced surfers
Beale	North of Ballybunion	County Kerry	Right and left	Beach-break	Beginners wave
Brandon Bay	Maharees	County Kerry	Right and left	Beach-break	All surfers
Coumeenole	Slea Head	County Kerry	Right and left	Beach-break	Experienced surfers
Inch Reef	East of Dingle	County Kerry	Right and left	Sand-bar	Experienced surfers
Inch Strand	Inch (Castlemaine Harbour)	County Kerry	Right and left	Beach-break	Beginners wave
Rossbeigh	Rossbeigh	County Kerry	Right and left	Beach-break	Beginners wave
Sandy Bay	Maharees	County Kerry	Right	Sand-bar	Experienced surfers
St. Finnians Bay	between Puffin Island and Ballinskelligs	County Kerry	Right and left	Beach-break	All surfers
The Old Hatchery	Waterville	County Kerry	Left	Point-break	Experienced surfers
Barley Cove	Barleycove	County Cork	Right and left	Beach-break	All surfers
Do More Reefs	near Glandore	County Cork	Right and left	Rivermouth	Experienced surfers
Donomore Reefs	off Ballinglanna	County Cork	Right and left	Reef-rocky	Experienced surfers
Dunworley	on Seven Heads Peninsula	County Cork	Right and left	Beach-break	All surfers
Fennels Bay	between Crosshaven and Myrtleville	County Cork	Right and left	Beach-break	All surfers
Fennels Bay Reef	between Crosshaven and Myrtleville	County Cork	Left	Reef-rocky	Experienced surfers
Garretstown	near Kinsale	County Cork	Right and left	Beach-break	All surfers
Inch (Whitegate)	between Roche's Point Lighthouse and Power Head	County Cork	Right and left	Reef-rocky	All surfers
Inchydoney	Inchydoney	County Cork	Right and left	Beach-break	All surfers
Langerville	off Ardfield	County Cork	Right and left	Reef-rocky	Beginners wave
Long Strand	near Galley Head Lighthouse	County Cork	Right and left	Beach-break	Experienced surfers
Ownahincha	Owenahincha	County Cork	Right and left	Beach-break	All surfers
Red Strand	near Galley Head Lighthouse	County Cork	Right and left	Beach-break	All surfers
Sherkin Island	Sherkin Island	County Cork	Right and left	Beach-break	All surfers
White Bay	beside Fort Davis	County Cork	Right and left	Beach-break	Experienced surfers
Annestown	Annestown	County Waterford	Right and left	Reef-rocky	All surfers
Bunmahon	Bunmahon	County Waterford	Right and left	Beach-break	All surfers
Maghermore	near Blainroe Golf Club	County Wicklow	Right	Beach-break	All surfers
Tramore	Tramore	County Waterford	Right and left	Beach-break	All surfers
Killiney Bay	Killiney	County Dublin	Right and left	Sand-bar	Experienced surfers
Clogherhead	Clogherhead	County Louth	Right and left	Beach-break	All surfers
Dun Dealgan	near Dundalk	County Louth	Right	Rivermouth	All surfers
Curacloe	Wexford		Right and left	sand bank and shore break	sand bank for experienced surfers and shore break for all

== Big wave surfing ==
Ireland's location on the edge of the North Atlantic makes it a good location for accessing large waves. The record for the largest measured wave, at 19 m (62 ft) tall, is held by a buoy off the north-west coast of the country, and satellite imagery has shown a tendency for the generation of waves in excess of 9 m (30 ft) tall in the area.

Ireland's most iconic big wave, known as "Ailleens" after the nearby Aill na Searrach cliffs, is located off the Cliffs of Moher, County Clare, and is a popular location for tow-in surfing. Although championed by many as a "perfect wave", with a potential height of 12 m (39 ft), Ailleens is not an everyday occurrence, as it requires stormy conditions and strong east winds offshore.

Mullaghmore Head's 9 m (30 ft) waves, in County Sligo, have served as the platform for the Billabong Monster Tow In Surf Session since 2011. A nearby wave, known as "Prowlers", has been surfed at an estimated height of 15 m (50 ft).

== See also ==
- Big wave surfing
- Tow-in surfing
- Surfing in the United Kingdom
- Surfing in Scotland
- Tourism in the Republic of Ireland
- Wild Atlantic Way
