= List of shipwrecks in December 1857 =

The list of shipwrecks in December 1857 includes ships sunk, foundered, wrecked, grounded, or otherwise lost during December 1857.

== 1 December ==
List of shipwrecks: 1 December 1857
Ship	State	Description
Acadia	United Kingdom	The ship was driven ashore near Peniche, Portugal.
Beffroi	France	The brig was wrecked on the east coast of São Miguel Island, Azores. She was on a voyage from the Rio Grande to Falmouth, Cornwall, United Kingdom.
HMS Cuckoo	Royal Navy	The paddle steamer ran aground and sank in the River Medway at Chatham, Kent. She was refloated on 6 December.
Doram Andrei	Russia	The ship was wrecked at Aspö, Grand Duchy of Finland. She was on a voyage from Saint Petersburg to Liverpool, Lancashire, United Kingdom.
Epaminondas	Greece	The brig sprang a leak and was abandoned in the Atlantic Ocean off Cape Clear Island, County Cork, United Kingdom. Her twelve crew took to a boat, but two of them died before they were rescued on 6 December by some fishermen. She was on a voyage from the Sea of Azov to Cork, United Kingdom.
Her Perantien San Persidon	Greece	The barque was driven ashore and wrecked in Dingle Bay.
Lemuel Dyer	United Kingdom	The ship ran aground on the Brown Water Rocks. She was on a voyage from Liverpool to New Orleans, Louisiana, United States. She was refloated on 8 December and taken in to Nassau, Bahamas.
Robert James Haynes	United Kingdom	The ship was driven ashore on Læsø, Denmark. She was later refloated and resumed her voyage.
Windsor	United Kingdom	The ship was wrecked off the Cape Verde Islands. She was on a voyage from a British port to Melbourne, Victoria.

== 2 December ==
List of shipwrecks: 2 December 1857
Ship	State	Description
Centurion	United Kingdom	The sloop was wrecked on Puffin Island, Anglesey. Her crew were rescued.
Leverett	United Kingdom	The ship was wrecked at Sulina, Ottoman Empire. Her crew were rescued.
Monarch	United Kingdom	The ship ran aground at Sulina.
Pocohontas	United Kingdom	The barque was driven ashore at Rhodes, Greece. She was refloated on 10 December.
Sona Fratella	Kingdom of Hungary	The brig was driven ashore and wrecked at Berehaven, County Cork, United Kingdom. Her eleven crew were rescued by the Coast Guard and local fishermen.

== 3 December ==
List of shipwrecks: 3 December 1857
Ship	State	Description
Agnes Kelly	United Kingdom	The schooner was driven ashore at Girvan, Ayrshire. She was on a voyage from Liverpool, Lancashire to Girvan.
Chester	United Kingdom	The steamship ran aground at South Shields, County Durham. She was refloated.
Friendship	United Kingdom	The ship sank in the Baltic Sea off Hiiumaa, Russia. She was on a voyage from Cádiz, Spain to Kronstadt, Russia.
Lady Margaret	United Kingdom	The brig ran aground on the Sheringham Shoal, in the North Sea off the coast of Norfolk. She was refloated but found to be in a sinking condition and was abandoned. She was on a voyage from South Shields, County Durham to London.
Thomas	United Kingdom	The schooner struck the Clissera Rocks, off the coast of Anglesey, and sank. Her crew were rescued. She was on a voyage from Cardiff, Glamorgan to Dublin.

== 4 December ==
List of shipwrecks: 4 December 1857
Ship	State	Description
Devonport	United Kingdom	The barque was abandoned in the Atlantic Ocean. Her crew were rescued by Donau (Hamburg). Devonport was on a voyage from Quebec City, Province of Canada, British North America to Cardiff, Glamorgan.
Espindola	Norway	The full-rigged ship was abandoned in the Atlantic Ocean. Her crew were rescued. She was on a voyage from Quebec City, Province of Canada, British North America to London, United Kingdom.
Northumberland	United Kingdom	The ship was abandoned in the Atlantic Ocean. All 63 people on board were rescued by Jessie (United Kingdom). Northumberland was on a voyage from Liverpool, Lancashire to Saint John's, Newfoundland, British North America.
Pertindedo	Portugal	The schooner was driven ashore at Kilmore, County Wexford, United Kingdom. She was on a voyage from Viana do Castelo to Liverpool, Lancashire, United Kingdom.

== 5 December ==
List of shipwrecks: 5 December 1857
Ship	State	Description
Carnatic	United Kingdom	The ship was driven ashore at Mauritius.
Columbus	United Kingdom	The ship was abandoned in the Atlantic Ocean. Her crew were rescued by Elizabeth (France). Columbus was on a voyage from Demerara, British Guiana to London.
Dreig Gebruder	Kingdom of Hanover	The galiot collided with a schooner and was beached in Saltwick Bay, where she became a wreck. She was on a voyage from Hartlepool, County Durham, United Kingdom to "Seir".
Hannah	United Kingdom	The full-rigged ship was abandoned in the Atlantic Ocean off the Azores (43°30′N 33°00′W). Her crew were rescued by Edward Thompson (United Kingdom). Hannah was on a voyage from Callao, Peru to a British port.
San Spiridon	Greece	The brig was driven ashore and wrecked at Castlemaine, County Kerry, United Kingdom. Her ten crew survived. She was on a voyage from Galaţi, Ottoman Empire to Cork, United Kingdom.

== 6 December ==
List of shipwrecks: 6 December 1857
Ship	State	Description
Aghios Spiridones	Greece	The ship was driven ashore and wrecked at Rossbeigh, County Kerry, United Kingdom.
Annie Letitia	United Kingdom	The ship was wrecked on The Needles, Isle of Wight. Her crew were rescued. She was on a voyage from Youghal, County Cork to London.
Argo	Hamburg	The galiot was in collision with the brig Jane and Ann and was abandoned in the North Sea off the coast of Yorkshire, United Kingdom. Her crew were rescued by Jane and Ann. Argo was on a voyage from Middlesbrough, Yorkshire to Harburg.
Hermann	Bremen	The schooner struck a rock off the Isile Tremiti, Kingdom of the Two Sicilies and was damaged. She was on a voyage from Venice, Kingdom of Lombardy–Venetia to Falmouth, Cornwall, United Kingdom. She was taken in to Brindisi, Kingdom of the Two Sicilies.
Speculation	Norway	The galiot was driven ashore and wrecked in Havøysund. She was on a voyage from Hammerfest to Hamburg.

== 7 December ==
List of shipwrecks: 7 December 1857
Ship	State	Description
Cecilia	United Kingdom	The ship was abandoned in the Atlantic Ocean. All on board were rescued by Aladdin (United Kingdom). Cecilia was on a voyage from Berbice, British Guiana to London.
Elizabeth	United Kingdom	The brig was driven against the pier, ran aground and was damaged at Arbroath, Forfarshire. She was on a voyage from Dundee, Forfarshire to Seaham, County Durham.
Isabella	United Kingdom	The sloop was driven against the pier and damaged at Arbroath. She was on a voyage from North Sunderland, County Durham to Dundee.
Kate	(United Kingdom of Great Britain and Ireland) New Zealand	The schooner was wrecked at the entrance to Toi Toi Harbour (Toetoes Bay). The wind suddenly changed when she was at the channel's narrowest point, and she was driven onto rocks, snapping her keel.
Maria	United Kingdom	The ship was driven ashore and wrecked at "Trofana". She was on a voyage from Hamburg to Valencia, Spain.
Mary and Ann	United Kingdom	The schooner was driven ashore at Lindesfarne, Northumberland. She was refloated the next day.
Milford	United States	The barque was driven ashore in the Quoque Inlet, New York. She was on a voyage from Newcastle upon Tyne, Northumberland to Newhaven, Connecticut.
Nimrod	Denmark	The schooner was driven ashore north of Skagen. Her crew were rescued. She was on a voyage from Newcastle upon Tyne, Northumberland to Stubbekøbing.
Owen	United Kingdom	The ship departed from Saugor, India for Mauritius. No further trace, presumed foundered with the loss of all hands.
Perseverance	United Kingdom	The brig was driven ashore at "Torpez", 3 nautical miles (5.6 km) south of Sines, Portugal. Her crew were rescued. She was on a voyage from Sines to Vila Nova de Portimao, Portugal.
Planet	United Kingdom	The barque was abandoned in the North Sea 25 nautical miles (46 km) east south east of Fraserburgh, Aberdeenshire. Her fifteen crew took to a boat; they landed at Cairnbulg. She was on a voyage from Quebec City, Province of Canada, British North America to Sunderland, County Durham.
Wallace	United Kingdom	The full-rigged ship capsized in the North Atlantic Ocean approximately 800 nautical miles (1,500 km) from Cape Clear, Ireland, after being struck by a large wave. Survivors were rescued on 17 December by Colina ( (United Kingdom) New Brunswick).

== 8 December ==
List of shipwrecks: 8 December 1857
Ship	State	Description
Adolf Frederick	Denmark	The brig sprang a leak and foundered in the North Sea. Her crew were rescued by the smack Lord Raglan (United Kingdom). Adolf Frederick was on a voyage from Newcastle upon Tyne, Northumberland, United Kingdom to Lisbon, Portugal.
Cornelia	Netherlands	The brig was driven ashore in Gibraltar Bay and was abandoned by her crew. She was refloated the next day with assistance from the tug Orient (United Kingdom).
Elizabeth	United Kingdom	The ship was driven ashore and severely damaged at Arbroath, Forfarshire. She was on a voyage from Dundee, Forfarshire to Seaham, County Durham. She was refloated and taken in to Arbroath in a wrecked condition.
Jackson	United Kingdom	The brig ran aground on the Scheelhoek, off the coast of Zeeland, Netherlands. She was refloated the next day.

== 9 December ==
List of shipwrecks: 9 December 1857
Ship	State	Description
Cornelia	Netherlands	The brig was in collision with the tug Orient (United Kingdom), ran aground and was abandoned at Gibraltar. She was refloated.
Crimea	United Kingdom	The barque was driven ashore at the Boston Lighthouse, Massachusetts, United States. She was on a voyage from Smyrna, Ottoman Empire to Boston, Massachusetts.
Emmanuel	Prussia	The brig was wrecked at Höganäs, Sweden. She was on a voyage from Leith, Lothian to Copenhagen, Denmark.
Eva Dorothea	Bremen	The ship was driven ashore at Cape Henry, Virginia, United States. All on board, more than 200 people, were rescued. She was on a voyage from Bremen to Baltimore, Maryland, United States.
Harmonia	United States	The full-rigged ship ran aground in Blommel Sound. She was on a voyage from New York to the Clyde. She was refloated but ran aground near Yell, Shetland Islands, United Kingdom. She was refloated on 12 December and taken in to Blue Minna Sound. Taken into Culli Voe on 17 December, she was declared a total loss on 19 December.

== 10 December ==
List of shipwrecks: 10 December 1857
Ship	State	Description
Eugenie	United Kingdom	The ship was driven ashore and wrecked on Valentia Island, County Kerry. She was on a voyage from the Rio Grande to Queenstown, County Cork or Falmouth, Cornwall.
Waterloo	United Kingdom	The barque was driven ashore and wrecked on Texel, North Holland, Netherlands. Her crew were rescued. She was on a voyage from Bombay, India to Bremen. She subsequently floated off and drifted out to sea. She was taken in to Cuxhaven on 14 December.

== 11 December ==
List of shipwrecks: 11 December 1857
Ship	State	Description
Conflict	United Kingdom	The ship was driven ashore north east of Port Louis, Mauritius. she was on a voyage from London to Port Louis. She was refloated and taken in to Port Louis.
Eugenie	United Kingdom	The steamship ran aground at Ystad, Sweden. She was on a voyage from Hull, Yorkshire to Stettin. She was later refloated and taken in to Malmö, Sweden for repairs.
Valdivia	Chile	The steamship ran aground on rocks "near Sligo" and broke in two. She was on a voyage from Valparaíso to the Chiloe Islands.

== 12 December ==
List of shipwrecks: 12 December 1857
Ship	State	Description
Amaranth	United Kingdom	The ship was driven ashore at Tynemouth, Northumberland. She was refloated.
Atalanta	United Kingdom	The brig collided with Times (United Kingdom) and foundered in the Irish Sea off The Skerries, County Antrim. Her crew were rescued. Atalanta was on a voyage from Liverpool, Lancashire to Buenos Aires, Argentina.
Army	United Kingdom	The brig was driven ashore at Dungeness, Kent. She was on a voyage from Hartlepool, County Durham to Bordeaux, Gironde, France. She was refloated on 18 December and taken in to Ramsgate, Kent in a leaky condition.
Belle	United Kingdom	The schooner ran aground on the Longsand, in the North Sea off the coast of Essex. She was on a voyage from Sunderland, County Durham to Southampton, Hampshire. She was refloated and resumed her voyage in a leaky condition.
Cynthia	United Kingdom	The brig was driven ashore at Missolonghi, Greece. She was on a voyage from an English port to Patras and Syros, Greece then Galaţi, Ottoman Empire. She was refloated with assistance from HMS Recruit (Royal Navy) and taken in to Patras.
Rotterdam	Netherlands	The ship ran aground on the Goodwin Sands, Kent. She was on a voyage from Rotterdam, South Holland to Marseille, Bouches-du-Rhône, France. She was refloated the next day and taken in to The Downs.

== 13 December ==
List of shipwrecks: 13 December 1857
Ship	State	Description
Atalanta	United Kingdom	The brig collided with the steamship Times (United Kingdom) and sank in St. George's Channel. Her crew were rescued by Times. Atalanta was on a voyage from Liverpool, Lancashire to Buenos Aires, Argentina.
Banshee	United Kingdom	The ship was in collision with James (United Kingdom) and sank 4 nautical miles (7.4 km) south of Fort William, Inverness-shire. She was on a voyage from Inverness to Corran, Inverness-shire.
Electra	United Kingdom	The ship ran aground in the River Avon. She was on a voyage from Demerara, British Guiana to Bristol, Gloucestershire. She was refloated the next day and taken in to Bristol.
Hioma	Russia	The ship was driven ashore on Osmussaar. She was on a voyage from Hull, Yorkshire, United Kingdom to Reval. She was refloated but found to be waterlogged.
USLHT Howell Cobb	United States Lighthouse Establishment	The lighthouse tender ran aground in the Bahamas. She was refloated, repaired, and returned to service.
Rapid	United Kingdom	The steamship collided with the steamship New Pelton (United Kingdom) and foundered in the North Sea off the coast of Norfolk. All on board were rescued.
St. Lawrence	United States	The barque was abandoned in the Atlantic Ocean. She was on a voyage from St. Andrew's Bay to Limerick, United Kingdom. She came ashore in Boylagh Bay and was wrecked.

== 14 December ==
List of shipwrecks: 14 December 1857
Ship	State	Description
Cobourg	United Kingdom	The ship was driven ashore between Folkestone and Sandgate, Kent. She was on a voyage from South Shields, County Durham to Rouen, Seine-Inférieure, France. She was refloated and taken in to Folkestone.
Creole	France	The steamship sank in the Bay of Fundy. She was being towed from Granville, Manche to Saint John, New Brunswick, British North America.
Elizabeth	United Kingdom	The ship was driven ashore at Exmouth, Devon. She was on a voyage from Quebec City, Province of Canada, British North America to Exeter, Devon.
Lago	(United Kingdom of Great Britain and Ireland) British North America	The schooner was driven ashore on the south coast of Prince Edward island. She was on a voyage from Miramichi, New Brunswick to the Clyde. She was consequently condemned.
London	United Kingdom	The steamship ran aground at Brielle, South Holland, Netherlands.
Rapid	United Kingdom	The steamship was in collision with another steamship and was beached on the Cross Sand, in the North Sea off the coast of Norfolk, where she sank. All on board were rescued. She was on a voyage from Leith, Lothian to London.
Robina	United Kingdom	The ship was driven ashore at Maryport, Cumberland. Her crew were rescued. She was on a voyage from Cádiz, Spain to the Clyde. She was refloated on 30 December and taken in to "Dunmore".
William	(United Kingdom of Great Britain and Ireland) British North America	The ship was beached on Rutland Island, County Donegal.

== 15 December ==
List of shipwrecks: 15 December 1857
Ship	State	Description
Joblings	United Kingdom	The brig ran aground on the Gunfleet Sand, in the North Sea off the coast of Suffolk. She was on a voyage from South Shields, County Durham to London. She was refloated with the assistance of two smacks and assisted in to Harwich, Essex.
Lady Emma	United Kingdom	The smack ran aground and sank at Irvine, Ayrshire. Her three crew were rescued.
Orient	United Kingdom	The schooner was run down and sunk by the steamship Clarence ( (United Kingdom of Great Britain and Ireland) New South Wales) in the North Sea off the Mouse Lightship ( Trinity House). Her crew were rescued by Lifeguard (United Kingdom).
Vine	United Kingdom	The ship ran aground off Porthsgadan Point, Caernarfonshire and capsized. Her crew were rescued. She was on a voyage from Kingstown, County Dublin to Caernarvon. She had become a wreck by 17 December.

== 16 December ==
List of shipwrecks: 16 December 1857
Ship	State	Description
Argo	United Kingdom	The schooner was driven ashore in Moville Bay.
Chieftain	United Kingdom	The ship was driven ashore at Beachy Head, Sussex. She was on a voyage from London to Madras, India. She was refloated and put back to London in a leaky condition.
Earl of Zetland	United Kingdom	The schooner was driven ashore in Moville Bay.
Iris	United Kingdom	The ship was wrecked on the Falsterbo Reef, in the Baltic Sea off the coast of Sweden. Her crew were rescued. She was on a voyage from Riga, Russia to London. She was towed in to Malmö, Sweden on 25 December.
Juffer Ellegonda	Netherlands	The ship sprang a leak and was beached at Newbiggin Point, Northumberland, United Kingdom. Her five crew survived. She was on a voyage from South Shields, County Durham, United Kingdom to Rotterdam, South Holland. Juffer Ellegonda broke up on 19 December.
Mary Dare	United Kingdom	The brig was in collision with the brig Adonis (United Kingdom) and foundered in the North Sea off the coast of County Durham. Her crew were rescued by Adonis. Mary Dure was on a voyage from Seaham, County Durham to London. She broke up on 19 December.
Primus	Rostock	The ship was driven ashore and wrecked on Læsø, Denmark. She was on a voyage from Newcastle upon Tyne, Northumberland to Rostock.

== 17 December ==
List of shipwrecks: 17 December 1857
Ship	State	Description
Ebenezer	United Kingdom	The schooner ran aground and was wrecked at Newburgh, Fife. She was on a voyage from Alloa, Clackmannanshire to Newburgh.
Governess	United Kingdom	The brig was abandoned off Mauritius. She was taken in to Port Louis, Mauritius on 17 December.
Harmonia	United Kingdom	The ship was driven ashore at Culla Voe, Shetland Islands. she was on a voyage from New York City, United States to the Clyde.
Menodora	United Kingdom	The schooner collided with an American vessel in the North Sea off the Dudgeon Sandbank. She was consequently beached the next day near Grimsby, Lincolnshire. She was on a voyage from South Shields, County Durham to Shoreham-by-Sea, Sussex.
Volador	Flag unknown	The ship departed from Havana, Cuba for Falmouth, Cornwall, United Kingdom. No further trace, presumed foundered with the loss of all hands.

== 18 December ==
List of shipwrecks: 18 December 1857
Ship	State	Description
Amphitrite	Netherlands	The ship was driven ashore and wrecked at Noordwijk, South Holland. She was on a voyage from Batavia, Netherlands East Indies to Amsterdam, North Holland.
Anne Margarethe	Sweden	The ship was wrecked near Mandal, Norway. Her crew were rescued. She was on a voyage from Hartlepool, County Durham, United Kingdom to Nyköping.
Nathalia	Stolp	The schooner was driven against the quayside and ran aground at Sunderland, County Durham. She was on a voyage from Sunderland to Swinemünde, Prussia.
St. George	(United Kingdom of Great Britain and Ireland) British North America	The crewless barque was driven ashore on North Uist, Outer Hebrides.

== 19 December ==
List of shipwrecks: 19 December 1857
Ship	State	Description
Hope	United Kingdom	The schooner was driven ashore on the Seaton Sea Rocks, on the coast of Northumberland. She was on a voyage from London to Newcastle upon Tyne, Northumberland. She was refloated on 21 December and taken in to Blyth, Northumberland.
Nordstjernen	Sweden	The brig ran aground on the Goodwin Sands, Kent, United Kingdom. She was on a voyage from Newcastle upon Tyne to Alexandria, Egypt. She was refloated and taken in to The Downs.
Rolla	United Kingdom	The brig ran aground at Berwick upon Tweed, Northumberland. She was refloated on 23 December.

== 20 December ==
List of shipwrecks: 20 December 1857
Ship	State	Description
Archipelago	United Kingdom	The ship ran aground on the Galloper Sand, in the North Sea off the coast of Suffolk. She was on a voyage from Taganrog, Russia to Hull, Yorkshire. She was refloated with the assistance of a smack and assisted in to Harwich, Essex.
Bella Portena	United Kingdom	The brig was wrecked on the Braganza Bank. Her crew were rescued. She was on a voyage from Liverpool, Lancashire to Pará, Brazil.
Bramley	United Kingdom	The schooner was driven ashore and wrecked 2 or 3 nautical miles (3.7 or 5.6 km) east of Calais, France. Her crew were rescued. She was on a voyage from Middlesbrough Yorkshire to Boulogne, Pas-de-Calais.
Earl of Carrick	United Kingdom	The steamship was wrecked on a reef off Dalby Point, near Port Erin, Isle of Man with the loss of all but two of the sixteen people on board. She was on a voyage from Ayr to Liverpool, Lancashire.
Porto Maruizio	Kingdom of Sardinia	The brig was destroyed by fire at Yarmouth, Isle of Wight, United Kingdom. She was on a voyage from South Shields, County Durham, United Kingdom to Genoa.

== 21 December ==
List of shipwrecks: 21 December 1857
Ship	State	Description
Amazon	United Kingdom	The ship was driven ashore and wrecked on Christiansø, Denmark. She was on a voyage from Riga, Russia to Hull, Yorkshire.
Ange Mathilde	France	The schooner was driven ashore at Wells-next-the-Sea, Norfolk, United Kingdom. She was on a voyage from Newcastle upon Tyne, Northumberland, United Kingdom to A Coruña, Spain. Ange Mathilde was refloated on 22 December.
Columbus	Spain	The brig was driven ashore at Dungeness, Kent, United Kingdom. She was on a voyage from South Shields, County Durham, United Kingdom to Naples, Kingdom of the Two Sicilies. She was refloated and taken in to Deal, Kent.
Crimea	United Kingdom	The brig ran aground on Scroby Sands, Norfolk. She was on a voyage from Hull to Constantinople, Ottoman Empire. She was refloated and taken in to Great Yarmouth, Norfolk in a leaky condition.
Daring	United Kingdom	The brig was wrecked at Aux Cayes, Haiti.
Elizabeth	United Kingdom	The schooner was driven ashore at Bacton, Norfolk. She was on a voyage from Hartlepool, County Durham to Boulogne, Pas-de-Calais, France. She was refloated and taken in to Great Yarmouth in a leaky condition.
William Clowes	United Kingdom	The ship was discovered derelict off the mouth of the River Tyne.

== 22 December ==
List of shipwrecks: 22 December 1857
Ship	State	Description
Daring	United Kingdom	The brig was wrecked at Aux Cayes, Haiti.
Elizabeth	United Kingdom	The sloop ran aground on the Brazil Bank, in the Irish Sea off the coast of Lancashire. She was refloated with the assistance of the gig I will if I can and beached at Egremont, Lancashire.
Jones	United Kingdom	The ship ran aground and was damaged at Inverness.

== 23 December ==
List of shipwrecks: 23 December 1857
Ship	State	Description
Ambassador	United Kingdom	The ship was wrecked on Gurse Island, in the Persian Gulf. Her crew were rescued. She was on a voyage from London to the Persian Gulf.
Mary	Hamburg	The schooner sank at Ceará, Brazil. She was on a voyage from Liverpool, Lancashire, United Kingdom to the Rio Grande do Sul.

== 24 December ==
List of shipwrecks: 24 December 1857
Ship	State	Description
Varna	United Kingdom	The ship was wrecked on the west coast of Tasmania. She was on a voyage from the Clyde to Melbourne, Victoria.

== 25 December ==
List of shipwrecks: 25 December 1857
Ship	State	Description
Allied Powers	United Kingdom	The barque was driven ashore and wrecked on Pico Island, Azores. Her crew were rescued. She was on a voyage from Ceylon to London.
Caleb	United Kingdom	The barque was driven ashore in Gibraltar Bay. She was on a voyage from South Shields, County Durham to Montreal, Province of Canada, British North America.Caleb was refloated on 29 December.
Dove	United Kingdom	The ship foundered in the Irish Sea 31 nautical miles (57 km) south west of the Hook Lighthouse, County Wexford. Her crew were rescued. She was on a voyage from Waterford to Cardiff, Glamorgan.
Harborg	Netherlands	The steamship ran aground and was wrecked at "Leeming". Her crew were rescued. She was on a voyage from Wolgast, Prussia to Newcastle upon Tyne, Northumberland, United Kingdom.
Madras	India	The ship was wrecked at Bimlipatam.

== 26 December ==
List of shipwrecks: 26 December 1857
Ship	State	Description
Gefle	Sweden	The ship was lost near Sandhamn. Her crew were rescued. She was on a voyage from Rio de Janeiro, Brazil to Stockholm.
George	United Kingdom	The schooner ran aground on the Holme Sand, in the North Sea off the coast of Suffolk. She was on a voyage from Southampton, Hampshire to Newcastle upon Tyne, Northumberland. She was refloated and taken in to Lowestoft, Suffolk in a leaky condition.
Pearl	United Kingdom	The smack ran aground on the Long Rock, off Ballywalter, county Down. She was on a voyage from Wexford to the Clyde.
Sir William Wallace	United Kingdom	The schooner ran aground at "Melliste". She was on a voyage from Troon, Ayrshire to Dundalk, County Louth.

== 28 December ==
List of shipwrecks: 28 December 1857
Ship	State	Description
Glenmanna	United Kingdom	The ship ran aground on the Brake Sand. She was on a voyage from Sunderland, County Durham to Bombay, India. She was refloated.
Valparaiso	Netherlands	The ship ran aground on the Walvisch Schaal. She was on a voyage from Vlissingen, Zeeland to the Cape of Good Hope, Cape Colony. She was refloated and put back to Vlissingen.

== 29 December ==
List of shipwrecks: 29 December 1857
Ship	State	Description
Gleaner	United Kingdom	The ship was driven ashore and wrecked at Sønderberg, Denmark. Her crew were rescued. She was on a voyage from Hartlepool, County Durham to King's Lynn, Norfolk.
Terpsichore	Sweden	The brig was driven ashore at Savannah, Georgia, United States. Her crew were rescued.
Vrouw	United Kingdom	The schooner was driven ashore at Ballwalter, County Wexford. She was on a voyage from the Clyde to a French port. She was refloated and taken in to Donaghadee, County Down.

== 30 December ==
List of shipwrecks: 30 December 1857
Ship	State	Description
Danube	United Kingdom	The ship foundered in the Mediterranean Sea east of Malta. Her crew survived. She was on a voyage from Brăila, Ottoman Empire to Queenstown, County Cork.
New Whim	United Kingdom	The schooner was driven ashore at Sheringham, Norfolk. She was on a voyage from Hartlepool, County Durham to Portsmouth, Hampshire. She was refloated and resumed her voyage.
Success	United Kingdom	The ship ran aground off Kingsdown, Kent. She was on a voyage from Antwerp, Belgium to Cardiff, Glamorgan.

== 31 December ==
List of shipwrecks: 31 December 1857
Ship	State	Description
Corsair	United Kingdom	The ship was driven ashore at Flamborough Head, Yorkshire. She was on a voyage from Brăila, Ottoman Empire to South Shields, County Durham. She was refloated and resumed her voyage.
Deux Soeurs	France	The ship was driven ashore at Flamborough Head. She was refloated and resumed her voyage.
Skandinavien	Norway	The schooner was driven ashore and wrecked at "Torrinieja", Spain. .
Vine	United Kingdom	The schooner ran aground at Lindisfarne, Northumberland. She was on a voyage from Bo'ness, Lothian to Newcastle upon Tyne, Northumberland. She was refloated the next day and resumed her voyage.

== Unknown date ==
List of shipwrecks: Unknown date in December 1857
Ship	State	Description
Ajos Nicholaos	Greece	The ship was abandoned at Sulina, Ottoman Empire before 28 December. She was on a voyage from Brăila, Ottoman Empire to an English port.
Alby	United Kingdom	The ship was driven ashore. She was on a voyage from Liverpool, Lancashire to Trieste. She was refloated and taken in to Venice, Kingdom of Lombardy–Venetia.
Amelia	United Kingdom	The ship struck a sunken rock at Smyrna, Ottoman Empire and was damaged. She was on a voyage from Liverpool to Smyrna.
Coquette	United Kingdom	The ship was abandoned in the Atlantic Ocean on or before 2 December. Her crew were rescued by the barque Capella (Norway). Coquette was on a voyage from Huelva, Spain to Liverpool, Lancashire.
Danæ	Hamburg	The ship capsized at Buenos Aires, Argentina in early December.
Felicidade	Portugal	The brig was wrecked in the Indian Ocean (31°07′S 40°41′E). Her crew were rescued by Blackburne (United Kingdom).
Fides	United Kingdom	The ship was driven ashore on Læsø, Denmark. She was on a voyage from Stettin to Sunderland, County Durham.
Flirt	United Kingdom	The brig was abandoned in the Black Sea. Her crew were rescued by Isabella Hay (United Kingdom). Flirt was on a voyage from Galaţi, Ottoman Empire to an English port.
Fortuna	Kingdom of Sardinia	The ship was sunk by insurgent artillery fire at Saint Domingo.
Gossypium	United Kingdom	The ship ran aground in the Thanlwin. She was refloated and put back to Moulmein, Burma.
Governess	United Kingdom	The brig foundered. She was on a voyage from Ichaboe Island to Mauritius.
Margaretha Kristine	Denmark	The schooner ran aground on the Shipwash Sand, in the North Sea off the coast of Suffolk, United Kingdom. She was refloated and assisted in to Harwich, Essex, United Kingdom by Wonder (United Kingdom).
Mary and Elizabeth	United Kingdom	The ship was driven ashore at Saltfleet, Lincolnshire. She was refloated and taken in to Grimsby, Lincolnshire, where she arrived on 30 December.
Pharamond	France	The steamship was wrecked at Trabzon, Ottoman Empire.
Polly Hopkins	(United Kingdom of Great Britain and Ireland) New South Wales	The ship was wrecked at Port Stephens before 11 December. Her crew were rescued.
Providence	United Kingdom	The barque ran aground at Psara, Greece. She was refloated and repaired.
Resolution	United States	The schooner was driven ashore in Georgian Bay.
Springfield	United Kingdom	The ship was driven ashore at Dungeness, Kent. She was on a voyage from Newcastle upon Tyne, Northumberland to Cartagena, Spain. She was refloated on 15 December with assistance from the Coast Guard and put back to Newcastle upon Tyne in a severely leaky condition.
Times	United Kingdom	The ship was driven ashore by ice and wrecked at Lazelintzy Point, Russia.
Vigilant	France	The brig was driven ashore in Brandon Bay.
Vondel	United Kingdom	The ship was lost in the Paracel Islands. She was on a voyage from Cardiff, Glamorgan to Hong Kong.
