= Museum of British Surfing =

Museum in Braunton, Devon, England

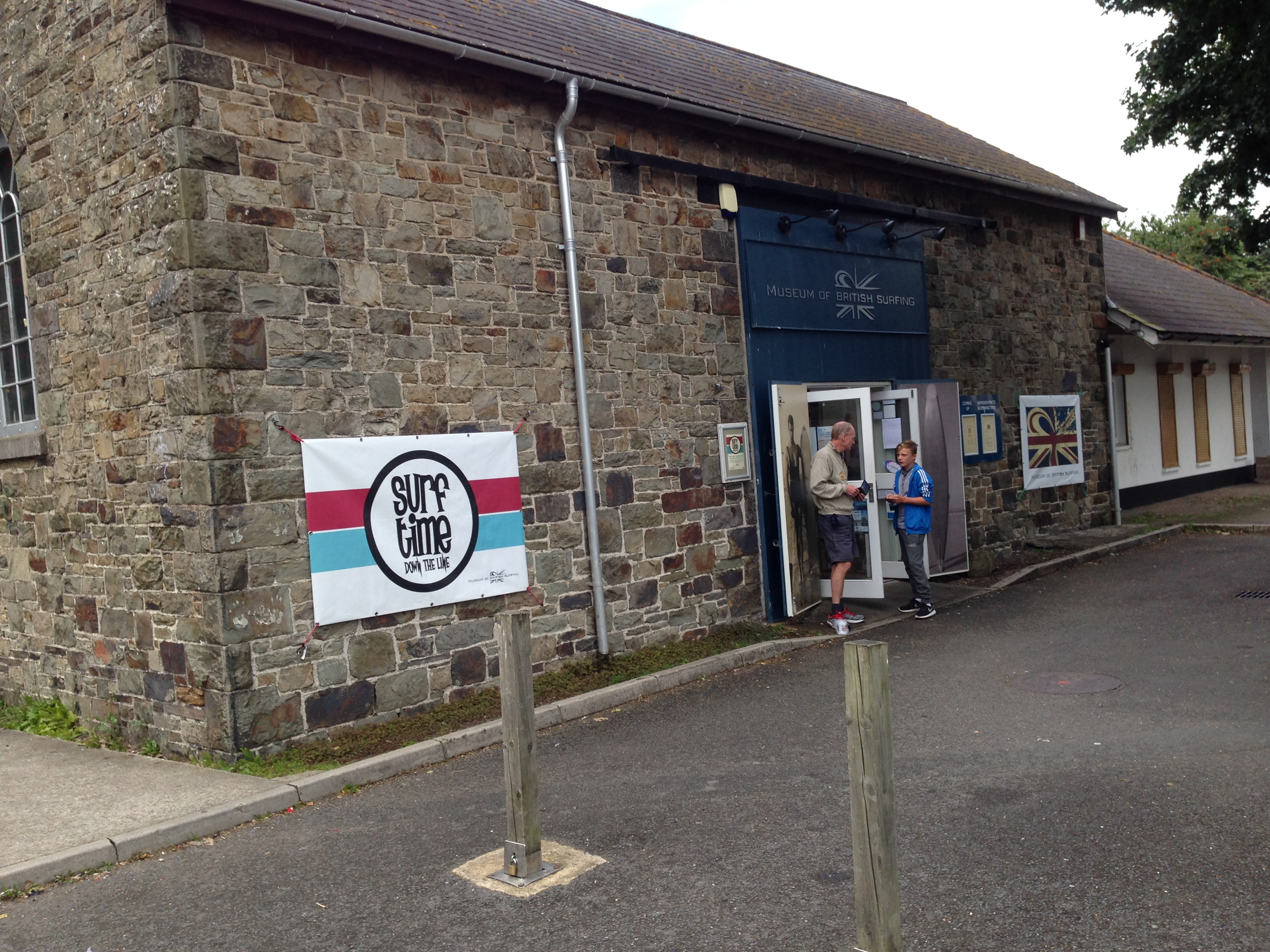
- The museum in Braunton

- Location within Devon
- Established: 6 April 2012
- Location: Braunton, Devon, England
- Coordinates: 51.1081°N 4.1627°W
- Founder: Pete Robinson
- Website: www.museumofbritishsurfing.org.uk

The Museum of British Surfing is a Museum based in Braunton, Devon; the museum contains exhibits relating to the history of surfing in the United Kingdom.

The Museum of British Surfing was founded by ITV News journalist and surfing historian Pete (Peter) Robinson as a non-profit organisation called 'The Surfing Museum' in 2003. It was originally an online UK surf heritage resource called the surfing museum.co.uk. The first public 'Exhibition of British Surfing History' was opened on 6 April 2004 in Brighton's heritage fishing quarter. The project was funded by the founder, along with an initial donation from the family of the late Viscount Ted Deerhurst and ongoing sponsorship from the surfing company Oxbow. The museum displayed Robinson's collection of British surfing memorabilia. Through the Touring Exhibitions Group (TEG) two main displays the 'Exhibition of British Surfing History' and 'An Art History of British Surfing' toured locations in the UK between 2004 and 2011 including London, Newquay, Aberdeen, Thurso, Marton, Brighton, Havant and Tynemouth.

These early exhibitions included the loan of a historic wooden surfboard, belonging to Hawaiian royalty, high chief Abner Paki, that dated back to the time of Captain James Cook. This was the first time it had been exhibited outside its native Hawaii. The board was loaned by the Bishop Museum in Honolulu and was displayed at the Captain Cook Birthplace Museum in Marton near Middlesbrough in north-east England. This exhibition also featured a visit by the Hawaiian cultural ambassador Tom Pohaku Stone, who carried out a public shaping of a traditional 'olo' surfboard which he donated to the Cook museum.

The surfing museum still maintains a mobile display which travels to surfing spots around the country. An oral history project, The First Wave, which collected the memories of early British surfers received funding from the Heritage Lottery Fund.

Registered Charity status was awarded in 2010, with the updated name of the Museum of British Surfing. Its permanent site in Braunton, near the North Devon coast, opened on 6 April 2012 in the former goods shed of the old Braunton Railway Station on the Ilfracombe Branch Line. Several grants were awarded to help open the museum, notably from Leader 4, the North Devon Coast Areas of Outstanding Natural Beauty, North Devon Council Section 106 - and from other local councils and charitable trusts to develop 'The Yard' (the building leased from Braunton Parish Council which contains the museum), and the surrounding site including the management of a local skatepark. It was awarded the Collections Trust award for 'collections on a budget' as a result of the museums commitment to working towards carbon neutral status.

The founder, Pete Robinson, donated "as a gift to surfing in Britain" his collection of surfboards and surfing memorabilia to start the museum. He left the project in 2015.

Since 2015, the museum has been run on a voluntary basis by a board of trustees, Kevin Cook, Charlie Spurr, Ian Watson and Christian Dormer. It was awarded Arts Council England accreditation in February 2019.

The collection includes more than 200 different designs and shapes of British surfboards. There are also videos and photographs including the story of Devonian Agatha Christie with a surfboard in Waikiki. There is also a photograph of King Edward VIII when he was Prince of Wales, also surfing at Waikiki, illustrating the aristocratic nature of the sport in the first half of the 20th century. A recent exhibition concerned the pioneer in agricultural education John Wrightson who is reputedly the first person in Britain to surf when under the guidance of two Hawaiian princes David Kawānanakoa and Jonah Kūhiō Kalanianaʻole he took to a board at Bridlington in 1890.
