= R561 road =

R561 road may refer to:

- R561 road (Ireland)
- R561 road (South Africa)
