= Rossbeigh =

Sandspit with beaches in Ireland

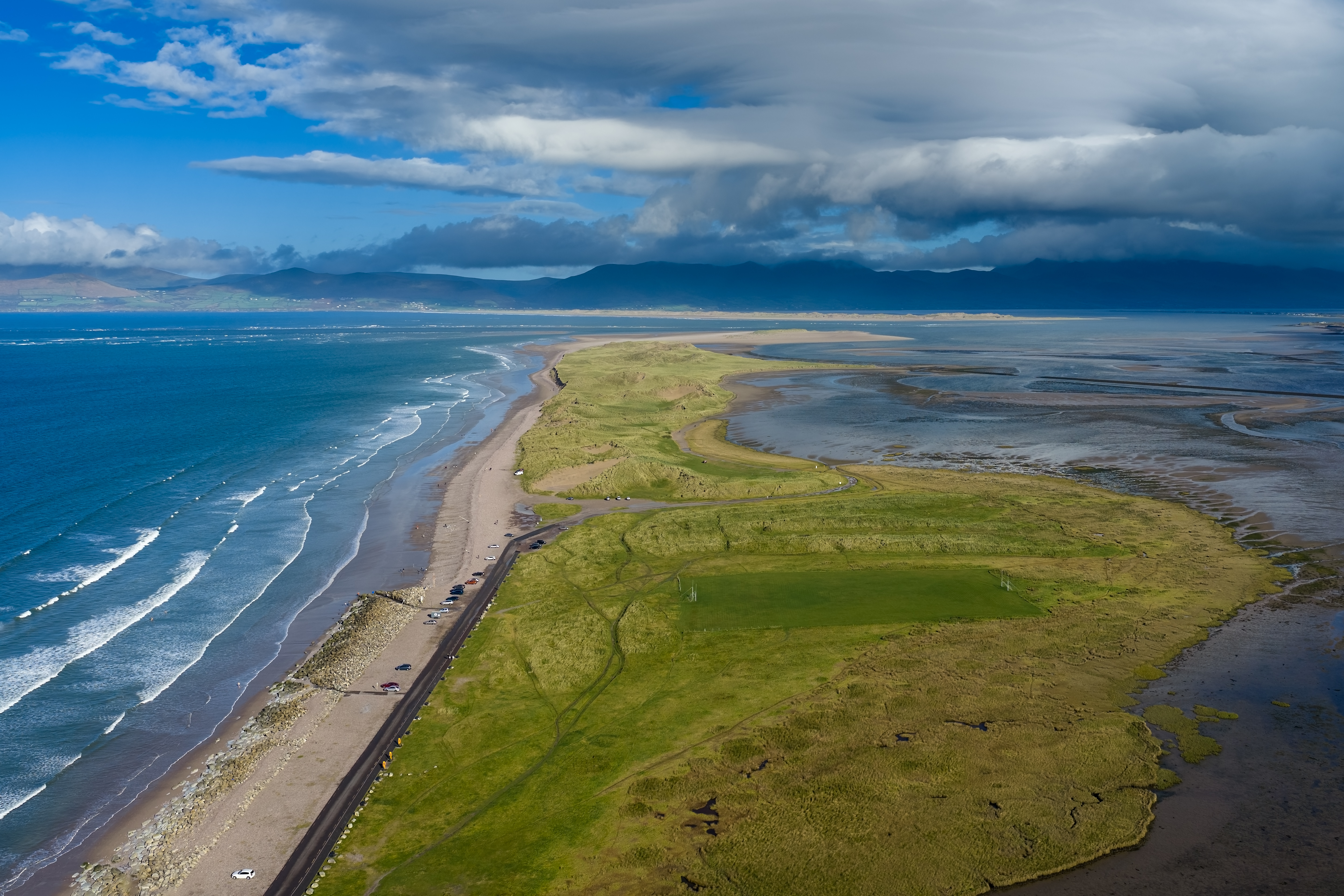
Aerial view from the south, with Inch Strand in the distance

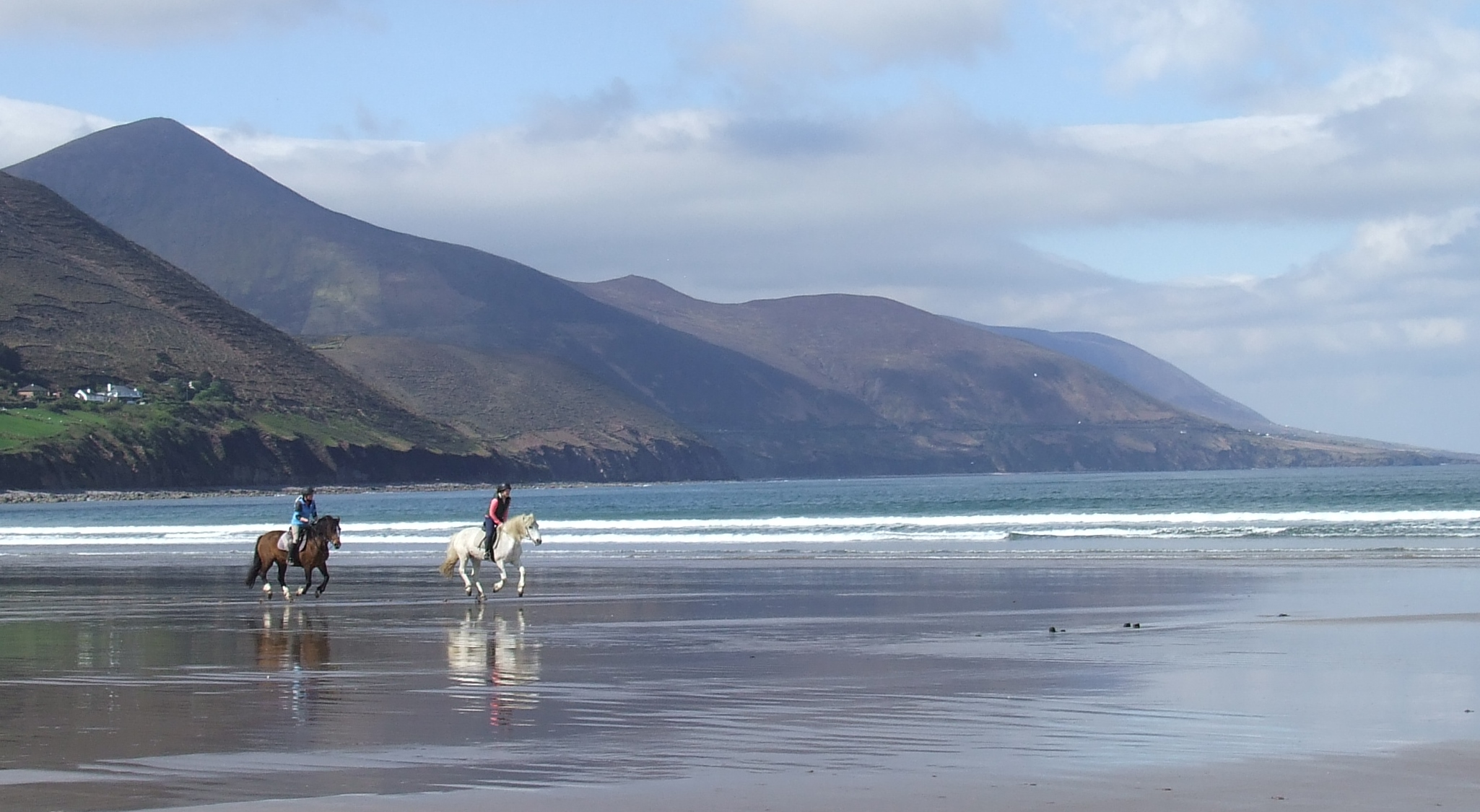
Rossbeigh beach

Rossbeigh, or Rossbehy (Irish: Ros Beithe, meaning 'headland of the birch trees'), is a sandspit with beaches on either side, located approximately 1.6 km from the village of Glenbeigh, in County Kerry, Ireland. It is on the Ring of Kerry, on the Dingle Bay side of the Iveragh Peninsula.

Rossbeigh contains a large volume of sand dunes and herbaceous vegetation. It is considered an important habitat for flora and fauna, including wildfowl (salmon and clam are locally farmed).

The beach is on the Wild Atlantic Way tourist route.

== Geography ==
Rossbeigh, along with the further inshore Cromane strand in the Castlemaine Harbour, and Inch Strand off the Dingle Peninsula (an equally long spit with an equally complex and unstable sand dune systems), is one of three sandspits acting as natural barriers against the Atlantic Ocean for Dingle Bay, which is relatively narrow and subject to strong wave forces and deposition of sediment.

== Erosion ==
During the early 2000s, slow but prolonged erosion caused by changes in tidal range, wave height and length, and a reduction in sediment deposits, lead to the receding of some of the dunes. Rossbeigh was breached during a winter 2008 storm when a 1200 ft sand dune was collapse by the sea, splitting the former two-mile sandspit into two, effectively making the outer part of the spit a tidal island. The Rossbeigh Strand Tower, which had been a landmark to Castlemaine Harbour for over 100 years, collapsed in February 2011. The tower has since been moved to the nearby village of Glenbeigh and restored.

As the split acts as a divide from Dingle bay, the collapse was described in 2020 as putting "homes across the bay at risk as climate change threatened even more frequent extreme events." However, Jimmy Murphy, of the School of Engineering at University College Cork was optimistic that dunes would begin to build back up. In 2020 he said: "people think when you get erosion that the sand disappears, but the sand has to go somewhere. It is deposited — about 10m tonnes — further out, and we feel it will make its way back. There is a huge amount of sand sitting out there, and...we think...that it will eventually make its way back in here and you will get your dunes reforming".

== Gallery ==
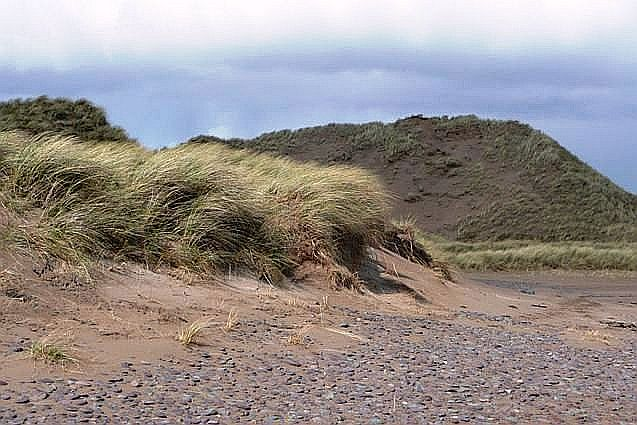
Sand dunes leading to the "back beach" roadway

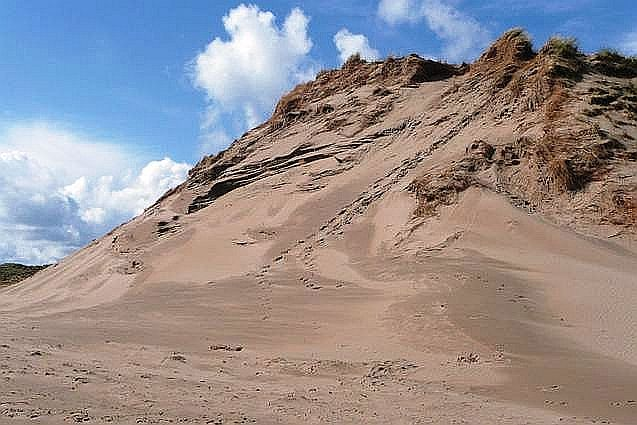
Large beach sand dune

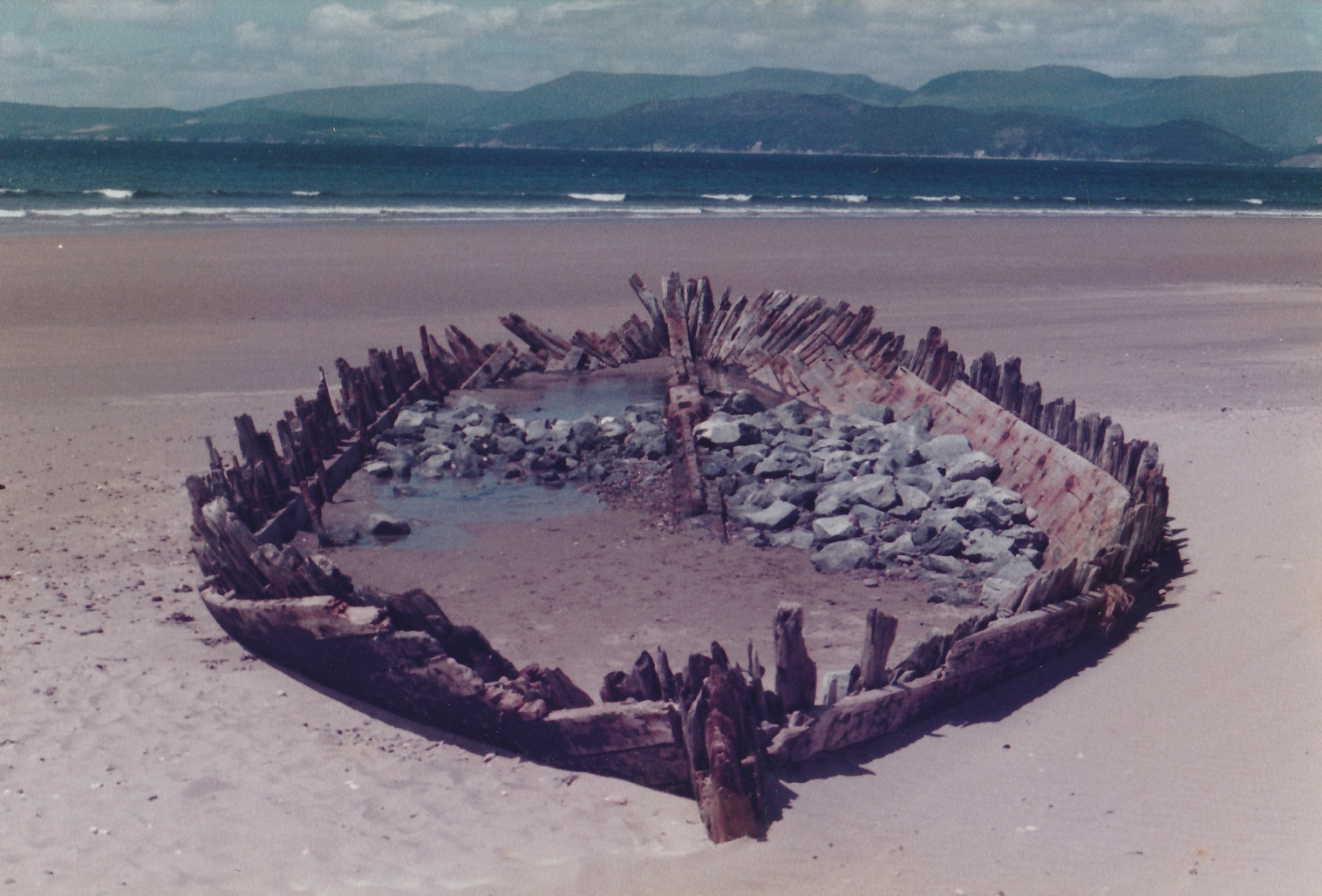
Wreck of the 19th century schooner Sunbeam in 1983

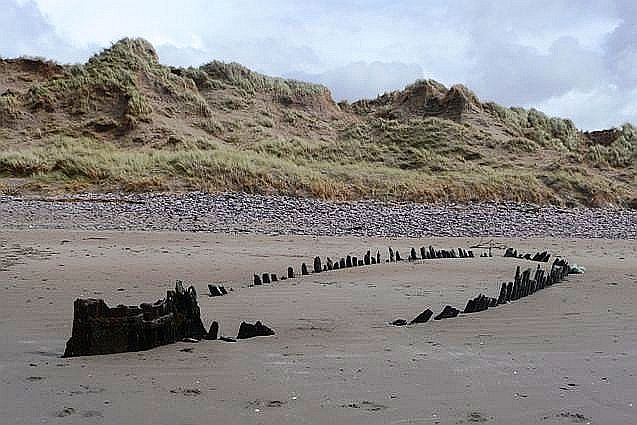
The wreck in 2008

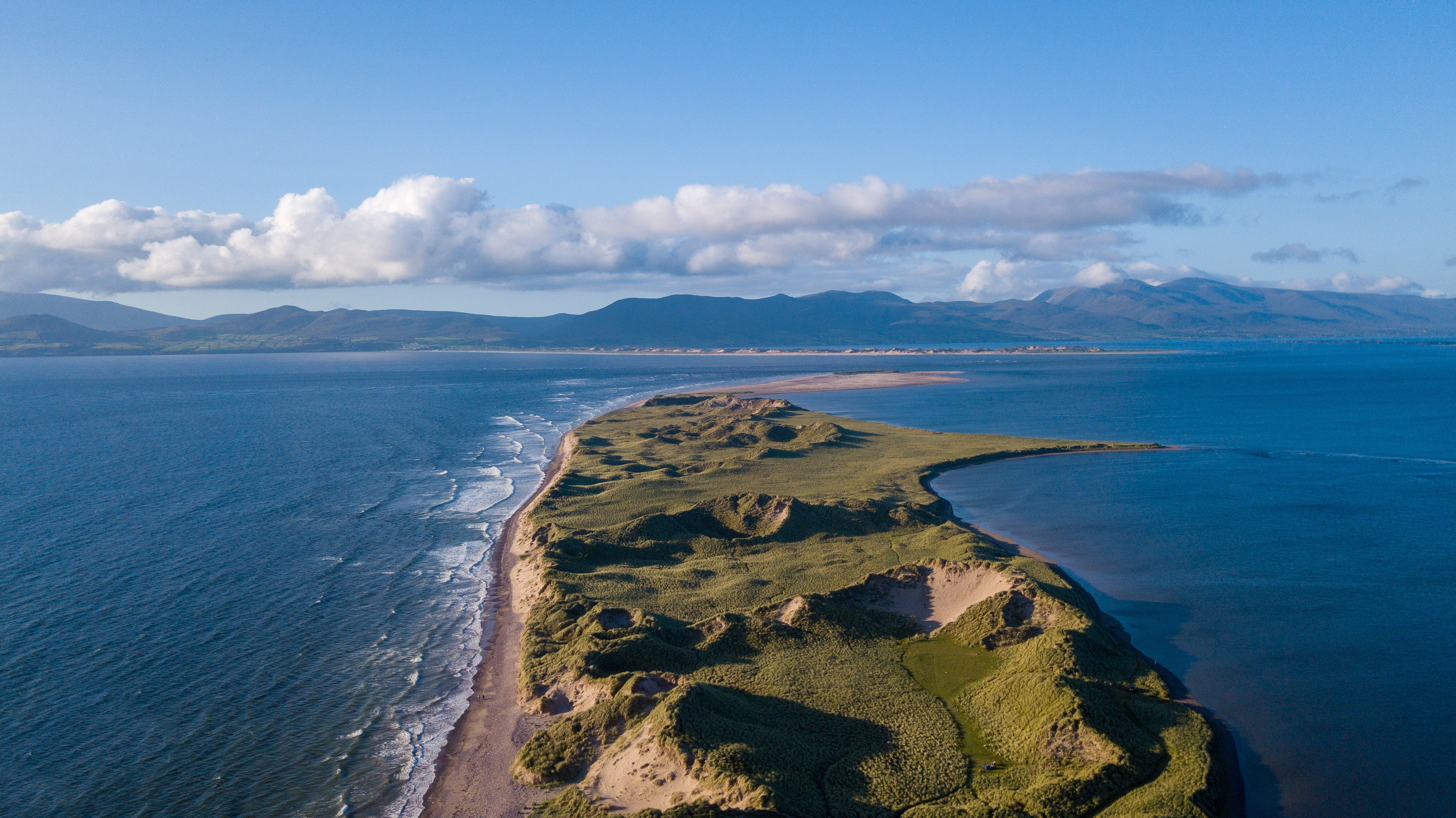
Aerial view of Rossbeigh beach's head

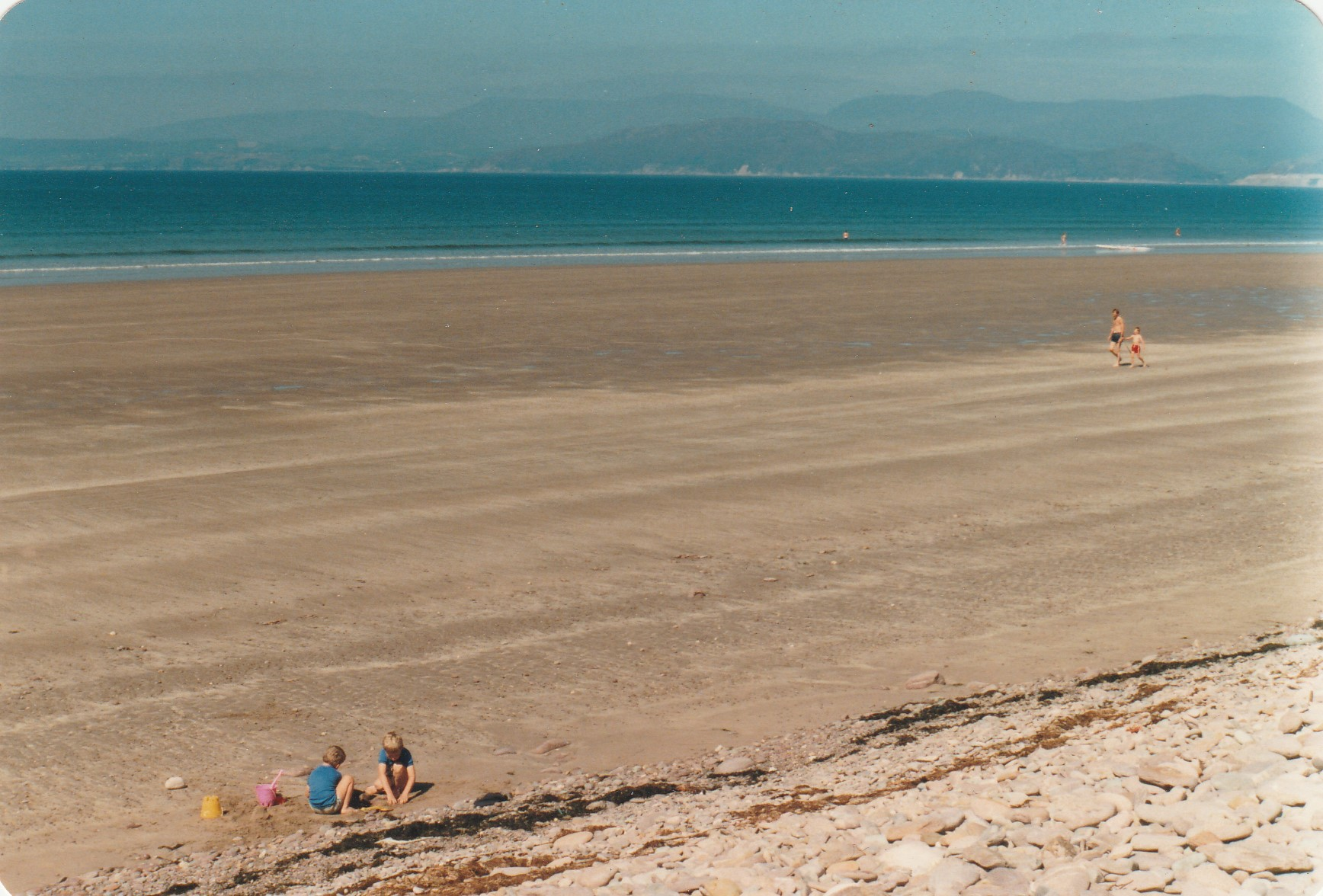
The beach, summer 1987

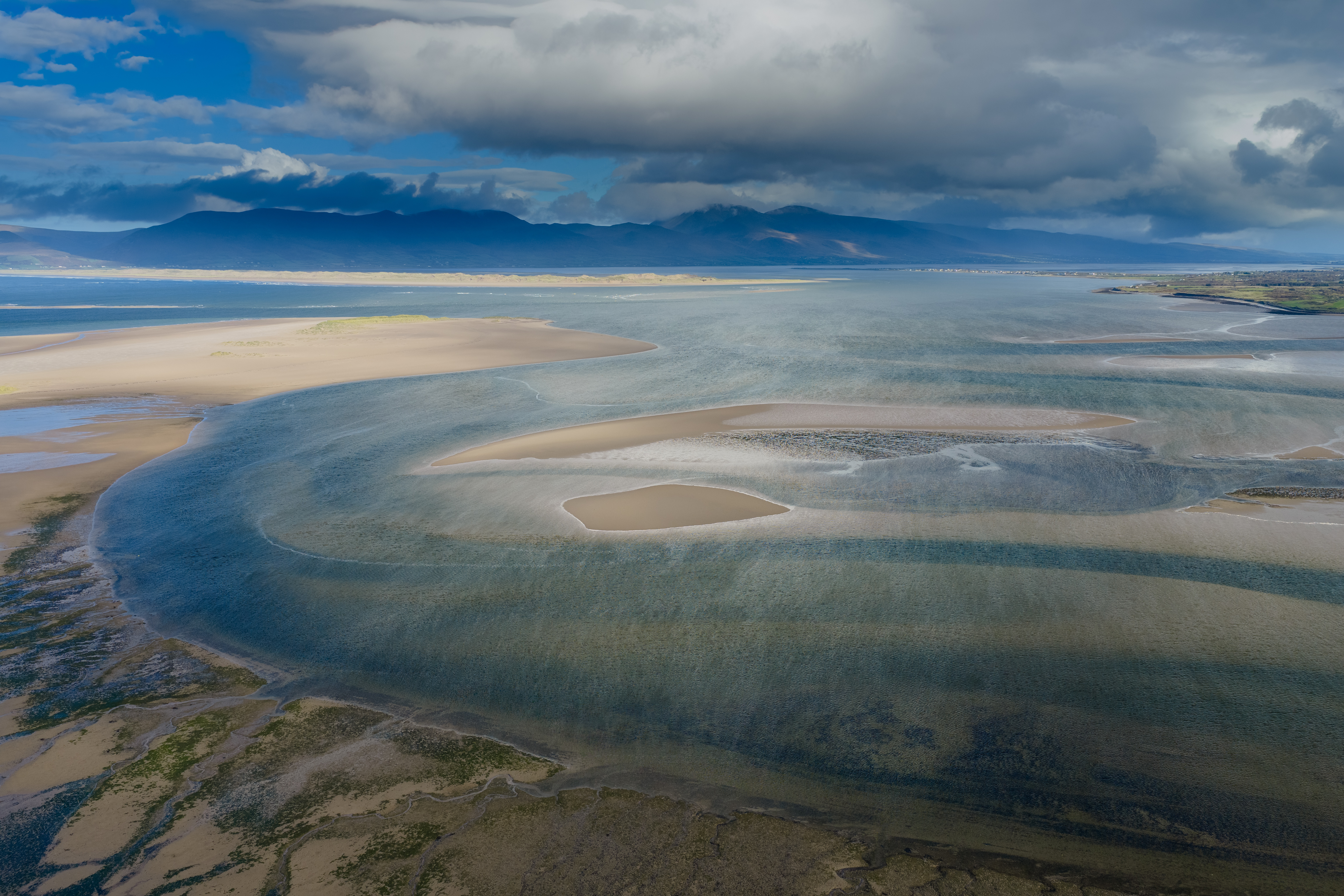
View towards north-east onto Slieve Mish Mountains
