= R561 road (Ireland) =

Regional road in Ireland

R561 road
- Bóthar R561
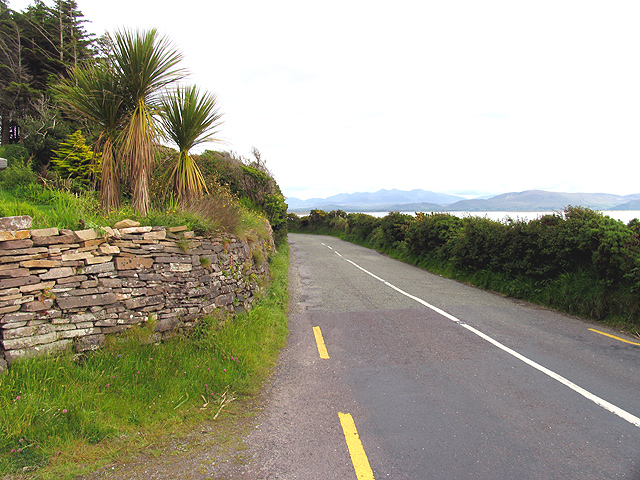
- R561 on Dingle Bay near Annascaul

Route information
- Length: 38.1 km (23.7 mi)

Major junctions
- From: N22 at Farranfore, County Kerry
- N70 from Brackhill to Castlemaine
- To: N86 at Ballinclare

Location
- Country: Ireland

Highway system
- Roads in Ireland; Motorways; Primary; Secondary; Regional
← R560	→ R563

The R561 road is a regional road in Ireland. It is on the Dingle Peninsula in County Kerry. Part of the road is on the Wild Atlantic Way.

Inch Beach, beginning at the R561, is a wide, sandy beach 6 km (4 mi) long. The beach dunes have yielded archaeological remains of ancient dwelling sites.

The R561 travels west from the N22 at Farranfore. The road joins the N70 from Brackhill to Castlemaine. The R561 continues west from Castlemaine along the north shore of Castlemaine Harbour to Inch and Inch Beach. The road then travels along the north shore of Dingle Bay before joining the N86 near Annascaul. The R561 is 38.1 km (23.7 mi) long.
