= Caragh River =

River in County Kerry, Ireland

Coordinates: 52.0701°N 9.886°W

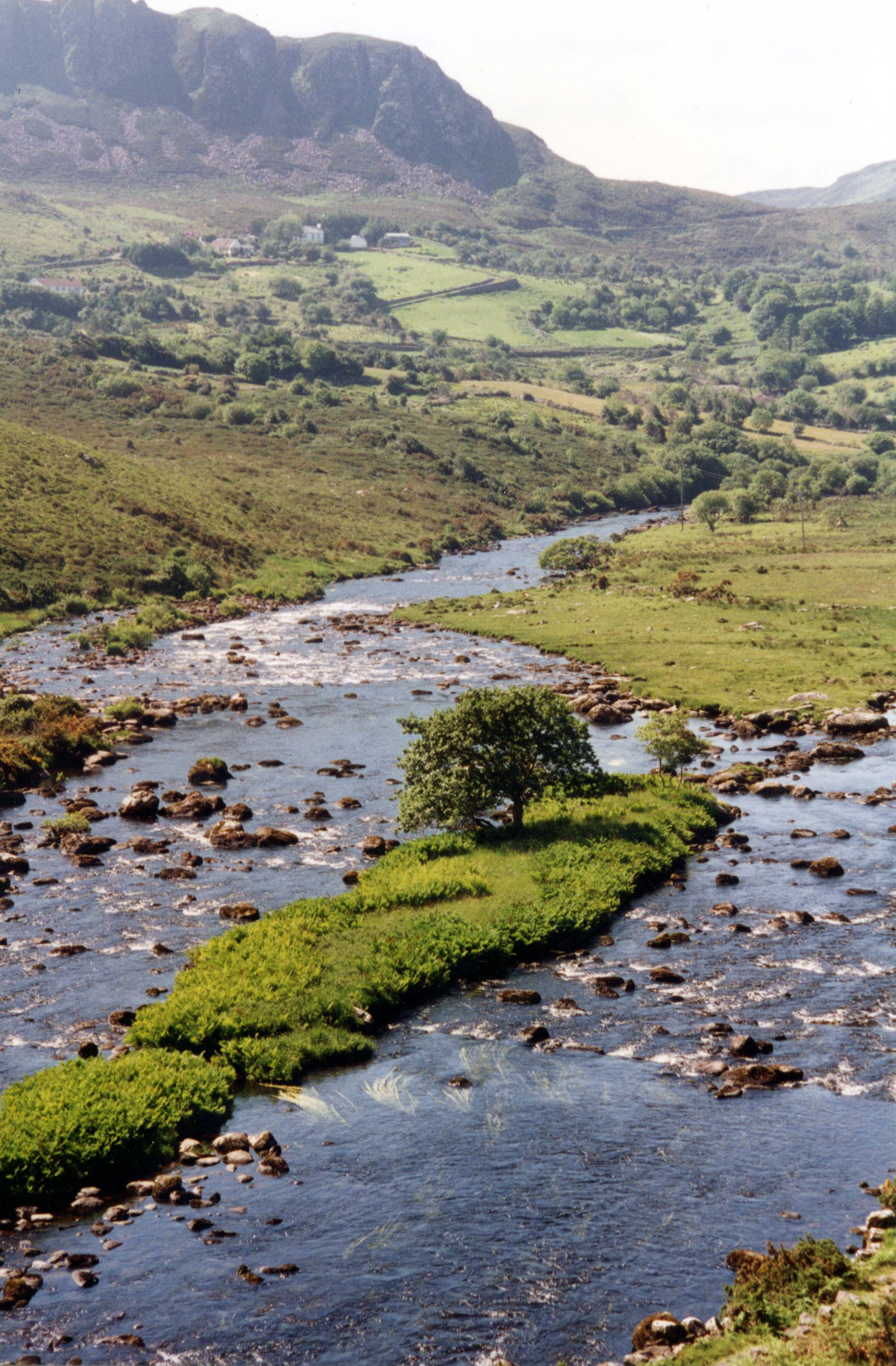
River Caragh at Scartnamackagh, from a viewing point off the N70 road

The River Caragh (Irish: Abhainn Chárthaí) is a river in County Kerry in southwestern Ireland.

The river has a catchment area of about 66 square miles (170 km^{2}), comes under the protection of a Special Area of Conservation ("Killarney National Park, MacGillycuddy's Reeks and Caragh River Catchment"). The river runs close to the village of Glenbeigh. The rare Kerry slug and the Natterjack toad have been identified in the area.
