= Welsh Surfing Federation =

Governing body of surfing in Wales

The Welsh Surfing Federation (WSF) is the national governing body of surfing in Wales, affiliated to the European Surfing Federation. It is responsible for promoting the sport by organising National Championships, participating in events to raise public awareness and for selecting teams to represent Wales at an international level.

The Welsh Surfing Federation is based at the Welsh Surfing Federation Surf School in Llangennith, Gower, which it owns.

== See also ==
- International Surfing Association - International governing body
- Surfing in the United Kingdom
