= Surfing in the United Kingdom =

- Surfers at Pentreath Beach
- Country: United Kingdom
- Governing body: British Surfing
- National team: Great Britain Olympics team

International competitions
- Summer Olympics

Surfing was first introduced to the United Kingdom in 1890 and has since become a popular pastime, particularly in Cornwall, North Devon, and South Wales. With approximately 500,000 people participating per year, it contributes over £1.8 billion to the UK economy annually. GB Surfing is the primary governing body for the sport of surfing in the United Kingdom.

== History ==
The Museum of British Surfing opened in 2012 in Braunton, Devon. English Surfing Federation is the official board in the United Kingdom for surfing. For Wales it is the Welsh Surfing Federation. Surfing in Scotland is a minor sport. There are also a number of popular surfing locations in Northern Ireland.

Russell Winter was the first British surfer to make the World Surfing Championship tour in surfing.

== Demographics ==
Women make up 20% of surfers in the country. 250,000 people participate each year in surfing. Surfing in the UK tends to be a sport participated by the more affluent classes in the society and generates £2billion per year.

== National board ==
In 2019, following on from a collaboration agreement between the Home Nations' surfing federations, British Surfing was established. The organisation describes itself as being "responsible for managing a British Team at selected ISA events which are seen as qualification opportunities for the Olympic games and responsible for managing matters related to elite athlete development at British level by liaising with UK Sport and the British Olympic Association".

== Surfing culture in the UK ==
There are surfing waves all over the United Kingdom from as far south as Sennen Cove in Cornwall right up to Thurso on the North coast of Scotland. Some famous UK surf beaches include Fistral beach, Pease bay, Llangennith beach and Boscombe pier.

== See also ==
- Outdoor recreation in the United Kingdom

== Bibliography ==
- The Surfing Tribe: A History of Surfing in Britain ISBN 0952364603
