= Glenbeigh =

Village in County Kerry, Ireland

Glenbeigh Irish: Gleann Beithe
- Village
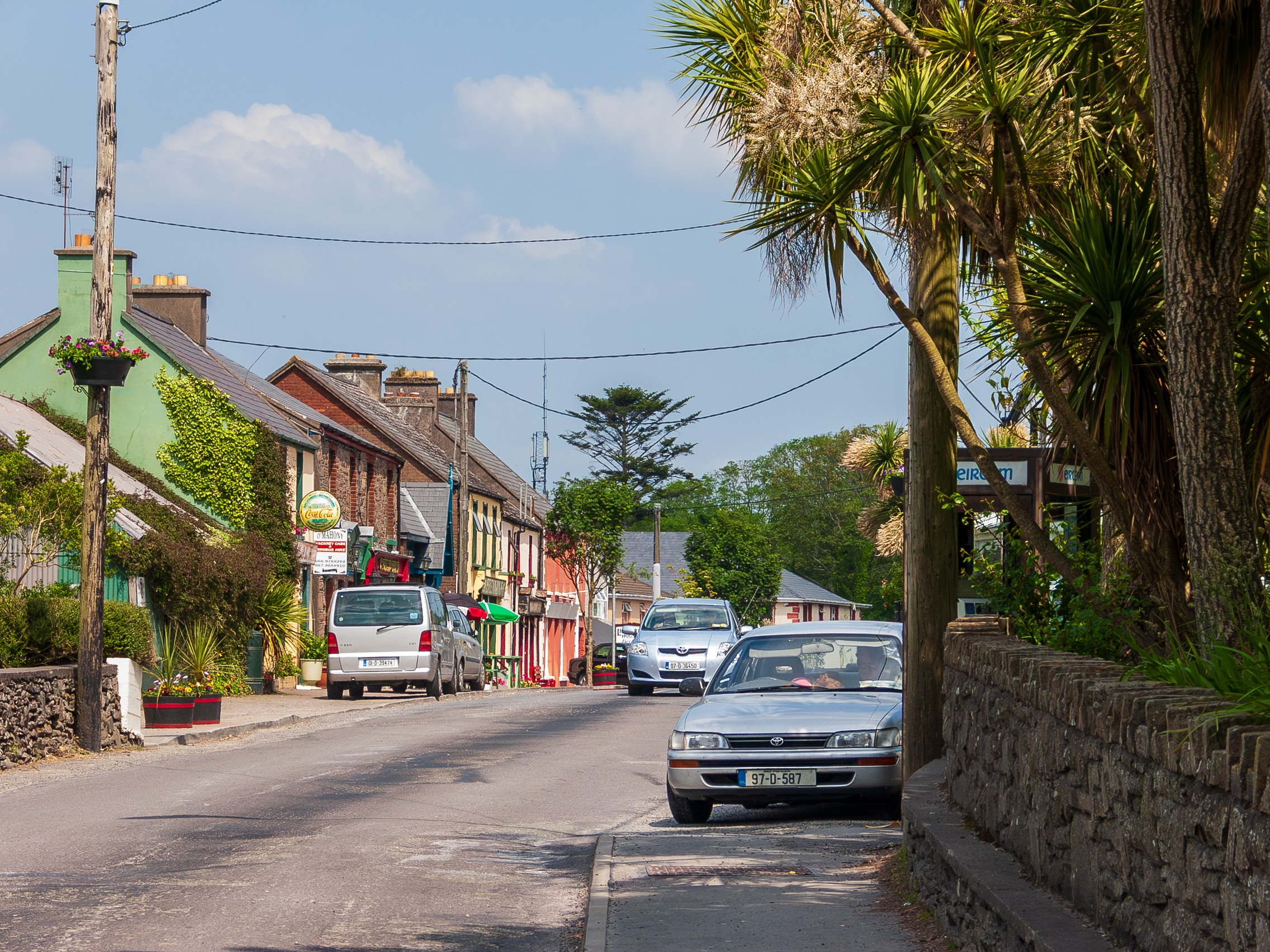
- Glenbeigh village

- Location in Ireland
- Coordinates: 52.058056°N 9.937778°W
- Country: Ireland
- Province: Munster
- County: County Kerry
- Elevation: 50 m (160 ft)

Population (2022)
  - Total: 426
- Website: www.glenbeigh.ie

Glenbeigh or Glanbehy (Irish: Gleann Beithe) is a village and civil parish on the Iveragh peninsula in County Kerry, Ireland. The parish includes Rossbeigh beach, Coomasahran Lake and a number of important rock art sites. Owing to its natural heritage, history and its location on both the Ring of Kerry and Wild Atlantic Way, Glenbeigh is a tourist destination.

The village is surrounded by a horseshoe of hills and Seefin Mountain, with Curra Hill dominating the landscape from the west. The Caragh and Behy rivers flow at either side of the village into Castlemaine Harbour.

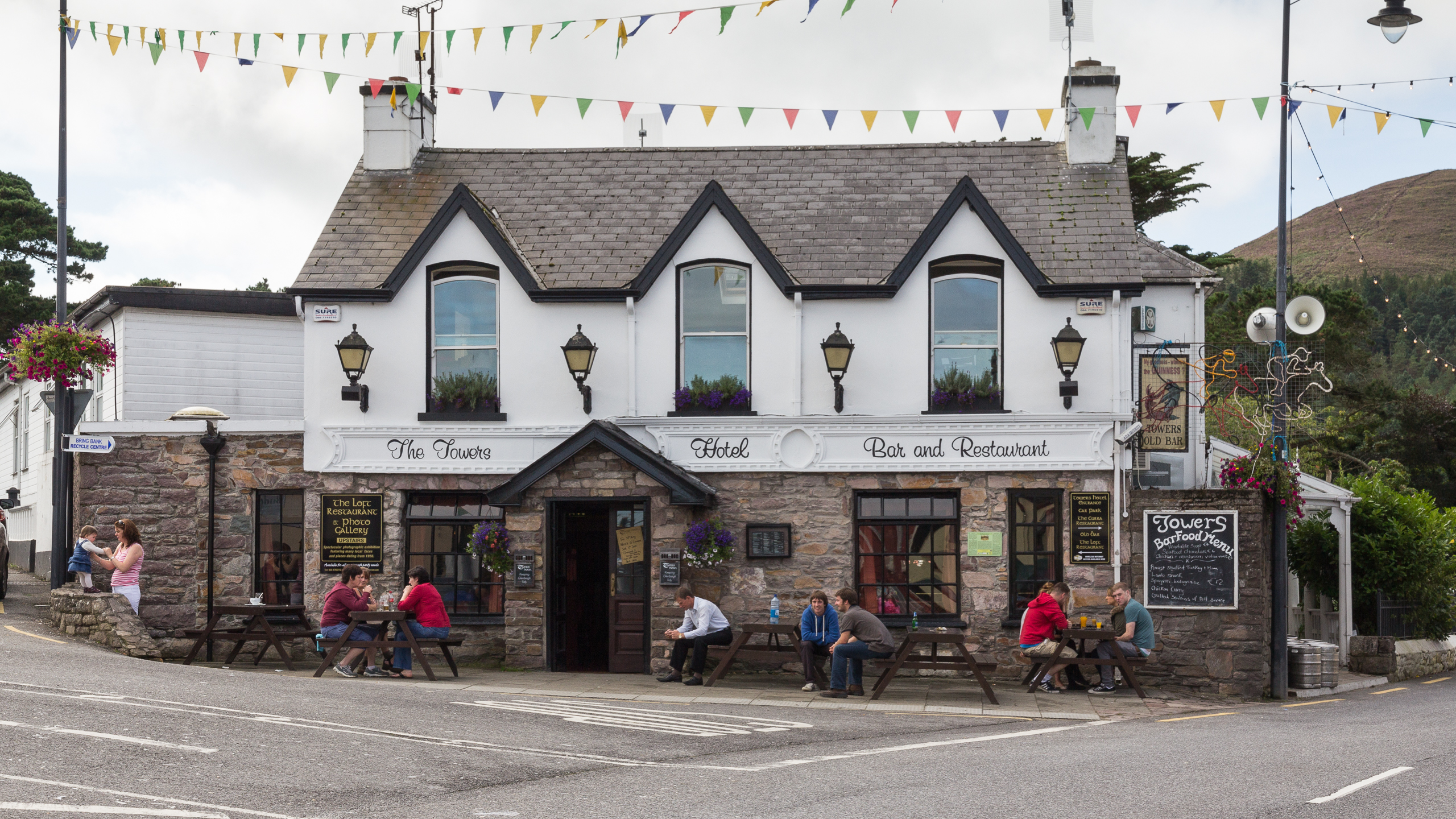
The Towers Hotel

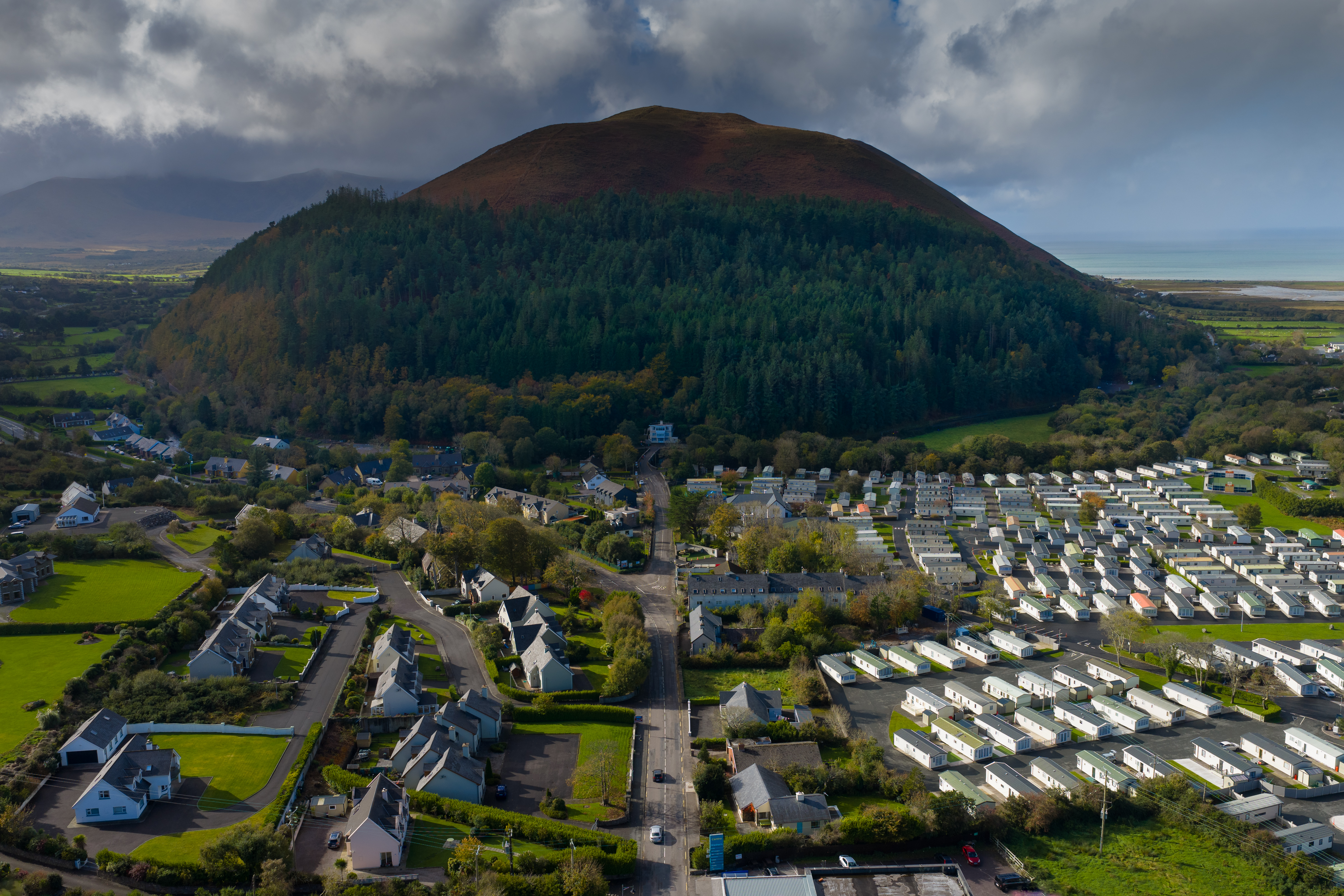
View from the east onto the western part of the village, the caravan park, and Curra Hill

== Name ==
The Irish name Gleann Beithe is from gleann "glen, valley" and Beithe, related to the Behy River (Irish An Bheithe) and the birch tree (beith). The anglicisation "Glanbehy" is the official spelling for the civil parish, whereas Glenbeigh is the spelling for the village where the N70 road meets the Behy River.

== History ==
The area around Glenbeigh has a high concentration of prehistoric open-air rock art. This rock art belongs to the Atlantic tradition, consisting primarily of cup and ring marks and radial grooves, and dating back to the Late Neolithic/ Early Bronze Age period (2300-1500BC). There is an especially dense cluster near Coomasahran Lake.

A number of Fianna legends centre around Glenbeigh. These legends suggest that Diarmuid and Grainne spent some days hiding in a cave in the valley of the Behy. Nearby Rossbeigh is known for being the place where Oisin and Niamh took to the sea on their white horse to live in Tír na nÓg (the land of youth).

Near the village is the ruin of "Wynne's Folly" or "Glenbeigh Towers". This mansion was built by Lord Headley Wynne in 1867. The barbarity and brutality of Mr Roe, the agent for Lord Wynne during the evictions, were said to be far in excess of the worst actions of his master. Gladstone's Land Law (Ireland) Act 1881, which in effect said that tenants should no longer be removed at will, did little for the residents of the Wynn Estate, as during the years of 1882 and 1883 there were numerous evictions. These evictions arose because the tenants could not afford the rent increases applied to cover the cost of construction of the castle. Not very long after this Wynn drifted into insolvency and left Glenbeigh.

During World War I, the castle and grounds were let to the British military for use as a training centre for reservists. In 1921, Irish Republican forces burned down the castle and it was never rebuilt.

Nearby Rossbeigh Strand is a sandy beach which lies under Curra Hill. A tower at the north end of the sandhills was used once as a guide mark for ships entering Castlemaine Harbour. Badly damaged in a storm in February 2011, some of the tower's stones were salvaged and used to build a replica on Glenbeigh's main street.

== Built heritage ==
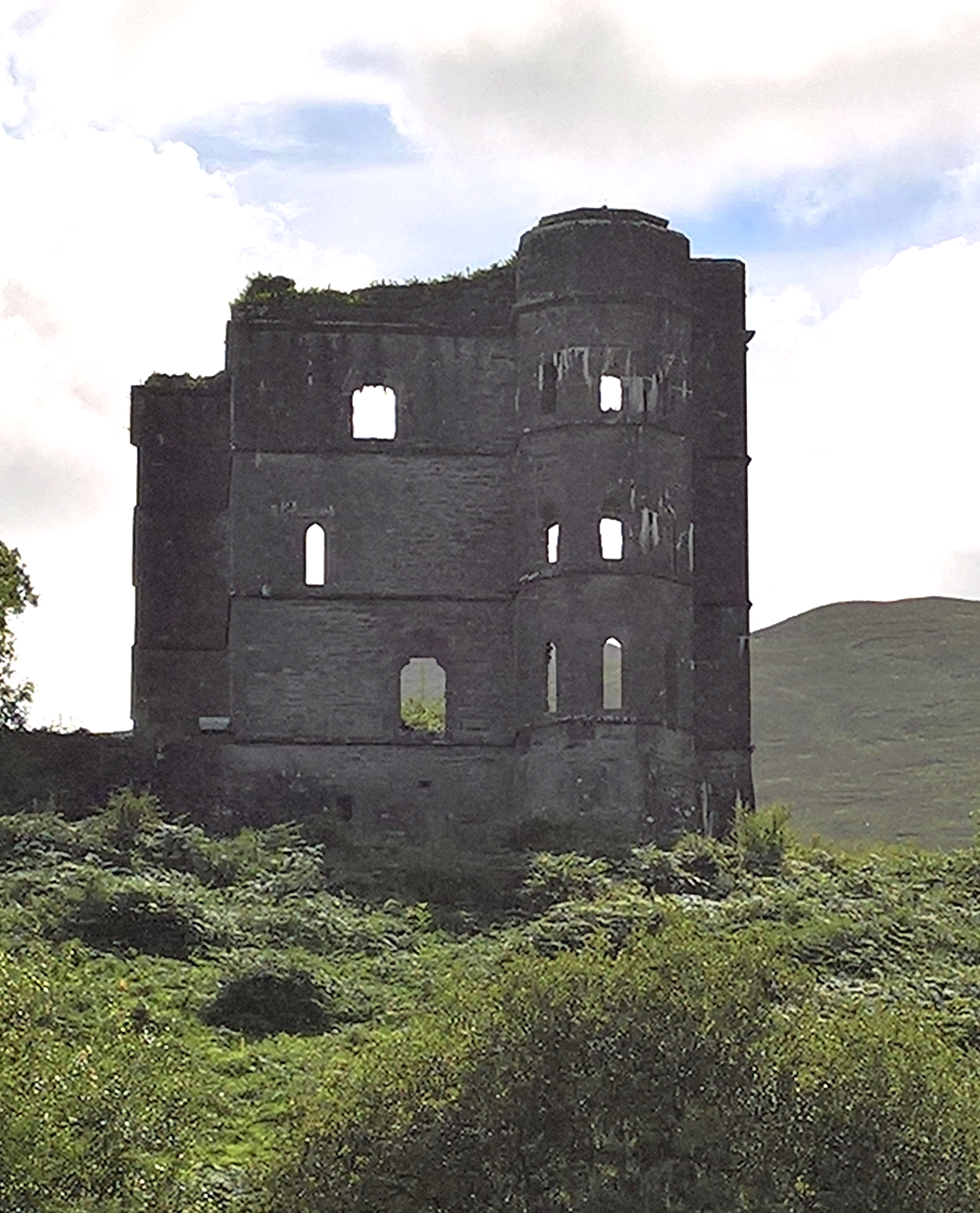
Ruins of Glenbeigh tower folly (also known as Wynn's Castle, Wynne's Folly, Headley Towers or Glenbeigh Towers Castle)

There are six structures included in the Record of Protected Structures:

- Glenbeigh Tower (Dúchas reference: 21306301)
- Church of Ireland (Dúchas reference: 21306302)
- The Towers Hotel (Dúchas reference: 21306303)
- St. James Catholic Church (Dúchas reference: 21306304)
- Glenbeigh Hotel (Dúchas reference: 21306305)
- Cottage (RPS reference: 063–001)

== Geography ==
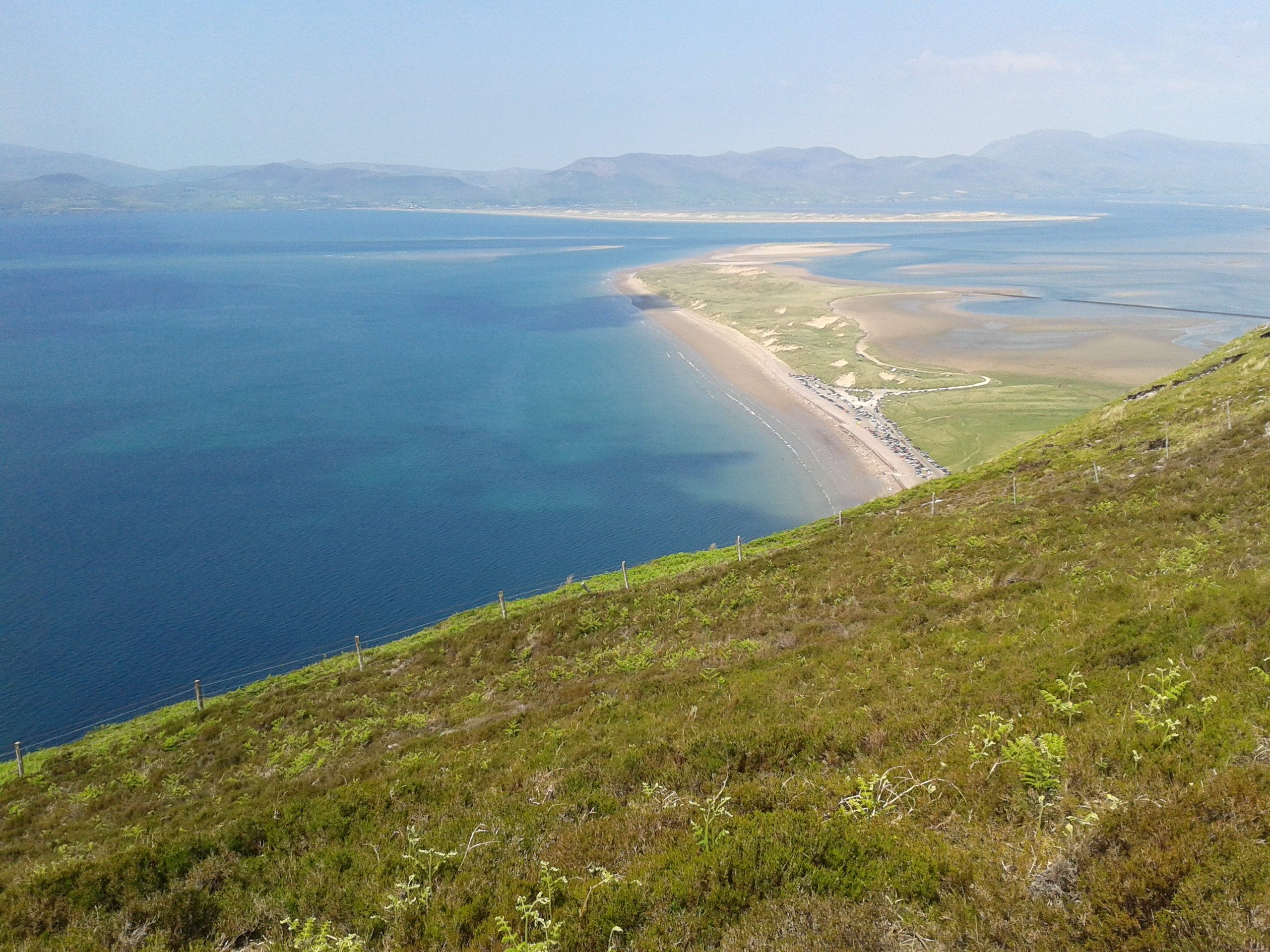
Rossbeigh beach

Glenbeigh is close to Rossbeigh beach and mudflats, and has views across the bay to Seefin Mountain. The River Behy traverses the western village boundary, meeting Rossbeigh Creek and Lake Carragh to the north and, to the south, the lakes of Coomaglaslan and Coomasaharn. There are two candidate Special Areas of Conservation in the area.

== Facilities ==
Glenbeigh functions as a local service centre for its catchment area and as a centre of tourism, being close to Rossbeigh beach and standing at an intersection of the Kerry Way walking trail and the Ring of Kerry.

The village has a church, community centre and Garda Síochána (police) station. The adjacent Blue Flag beach and walking routes provide outdoor recreational amenities. There are a number of small hotels, bed and breakfast accommodation and holiday homes.

== See also ==
- Rossbeigh Beach
- Caragh Lake
- Caragh River
- Ring of Kerry
