= Touring Exhibitions Group =

The Touring Exhibitions Group (TEG) is a professional membership association in the United Kingdom. Its members are mainly staff in museums, galleries and other public sector organisations who are involved in the exchange of exhibitions, whether as organisers or venues, or both. It was set up in 1985, following the closure of the Victoria & Albert Museum’s Circulation Department. TEG itself does not organise exhibitions or administer tours, but helps its members to do so.

== Constitution ==
The Touring Exhibitions Group was set up to be a membership body that would embrace the smallest venues as well as the largest providers of exhibitions. In the U.K., touring has always been dominated by exhibitions of modern and contemporary art so, to introduce more balance, TEG's approach from the outset was deliberately multi-disciplinary, embracing archaeology, social history, science and technology, etc. as well as the arts and crafts. To regulate how an association would function with a membership across this range of scale and variety of disciplines, its founding members drew up a constitution which was formally adopted on 18 February 1985 and which, with relatively few amendments, still defines how the organisation is run. In large part this continuity is because TEG has not attracted regular support from grant-aid sources and has consequently not been deflected by the priorities and pressures of these organisations. For the same reason, it has not built up a full-time staff who might have taken the organisation in directions away from the interests of the membership as a whole. Like other professional associations that are affiliated to the Museums Association, it draws its diversity of expertise, its authority, its policies and its funding directly from its members.

== Management ==
Members pay an annual subscription, which contributes to the organisation's running costs. There are two categories of membership: an ordinary one (currently with an annual subscription of £45) for anyone in the public sector involved in exhibitions; and a corporate category (currently with an annual subscription of £120) for commercial companies which provide services to public exhibitions (the Touring Exhibitions Group does not concern itself with commercial or trade exhibitions). Every paid-up member is entitled to vote in an annual ballot, which elects an Executive Committee for the following year. Not all members of this Committee have to stand for election each year, because the Officers (chair, treasurer, etc.) are elected for two years at a time. Those who do not become officers are entitled to serve three years, so the structure allows for both continuity and renewal.

The Committee meets four times a year and comprises around 12 elected members, plus people co-opted for needs not provided through the ballot, and observers from public agencies with an interest in touring. TEG has no premises of its own, so its various postal addresses are the addresses of members of the secretariat, and it meets in different venues, relying on the generosity of members who provide space for free. It will also visit organisations which are not members, especially if it wishes to have first-hand knowledge of a new building or a new organisation in the market.

The Committee is not just a ‘talking shop’: it is also a reservoir of manpower. Committee members normally hold down full-time jobs connected with exhibitions and give their time without payment. Not only do they contribute to policy-making and decision-taking, but also – the “executive” part of the name – they help to implement these policies and decisions between meetings. The key post is the Chair who, by leading the committee and inspiring its members, directs the organisation, often taking the organisation in new directions. Holders of the Chair have been:

1. Barbara Murray 1988-1992
2. James Ayres, 1992–1996
3. Caroline Krzesinska, 1996–2000
4. Kathleen Soriano, 2000-2003
5. Sarah Champion, 2003-2008
6. Andy Horn, 2008-2011
7. Louise Hesketh, 2011-.

When there is a task which a committee member cannot manage, usually because of a compressed time-scale or the amount of work to be done, the Committee will contract one of its freelance members to undertake the work. It commissioned Julia Ellis when the MGC asked the Group to draft the text of an insert to accompany its guidelines about touring. Each year's Marketplace is usually managed by a working group drawn from the Committee, but on occasions freelance members have been asked to organise an event: Cynthia Morrison-Bell organised the Marketplace in Croydon and Jane Bevan the one in Nottingham. In 1996, Mike Sixsmith was retained as a part-time administrator, then Judith Kelly became a paid membership manager in 1999, and Asako Yokoya the website manager in 2009. Jasleen Kandhari managed the seminars for two of the three years of the EFF programme, and her replacement during 2010-2011 was Paddy McNulty, thanks to sponsorship by TESS Demountable. This small, part-time secretariat provides the necessary continuity in membership records, financial control, managing the website and organising seminars. It gives the Committee the flexibility to allow unpaid members to devote themselves to one-off projects. None of the secretariat is employed, but each has an annual contract to provide services in return for a fee.

== Lobbying ==
The Touring Exhibitions Group was set up following the closure by the Victoria & Albert Museum of its Circulation Department, which had been one of the two main sources of exhibitions for regional museums and galleries in the U.K. It was never intended to replace what was lost, by organising itself a new range of exhibitions. Instead, it provided a voice for regional venues (and their visitors) which had been deprived of material of high quality. Its aim was two-fold: first, to lobby H.M. Government to replace the funding whose withdrawal had led to the closure, and second, to represent venues’ needs to potential alternative sources of exhibitions. The campaign began with a serious handicap, in that the collections of the Circulation Department, hitherto dedicated to “regional” use, had been integrated into the other departments in the Museum. Its first success was persuading H.M Government to fund the establishment in 1988 of a travelling exhibitions unit at the Museums & Galleries Commission (MGC), a previous incarnation of the Museums, Libraries and Archives Council. In the event, this unit lasted less than five years because the politicians were disappointed that significant quantities of so-called ‘hidden treasures’ – not least those which the specialist departments at the V&A had recently absorbed from the Circulation Department - were not being released from the basements of the national museums and galleries. TEG's campaigning role continues notwithstanding, and it contributes when it can to consultations undertaken by Arts Council England, the Department of Culture, Media and Sport, Heritage Lottery Fund, etc., to ensure that touring is included in wider policy discussions and to argue for more resources and better funding for touring exhibitions. In the other direction, organisations such as the Crafts Council, Creative Scotland and the Southbank Centre have observer status on the Executive Committee, which provides them with a forum where they can contribute to discussions on current issues and concerns and where they can exert influence rather than act directly.

== The Manual of Good Practice (1995) ==
The closure of the MGC's travelling exhibitions unit in 1993 – and, more importantly, the withdrawal of government funding – effectively blocked any further national initiatives in touring by museums. The Touring Exhibitions Group then switched its attention to its second aim, of representing the needs of venues to alternative sources of exhibitions. In addition to the remaining national provider (at the time administered by the Arts Council of Great Britain, but now run by the Southbank Centre), museum services and galleries were gearing themselves up to tour their own exhibitions. Even during the life of the MGC's travelling exhibitions unit, TEG had given a lower priority to what a national museum was prepared to make available (usually not primary material which would normally be on display). Instead it supported a broader strategy founded on what regional museums and galleries themselves said they wanted, on organising exhibitions on subjects of interest to their visitors, and on borrowing the most appropriate material to interpret these subjects. As a consequence, it devoted more attention to providing training and raising standards, by organising seminars and publishing Occasional Papers. The latter arrived at number three in the series before it was agreed that a comprehensive handbook was needed on how to organise and tour exhibitions. The last significant manual in the UK had been Teresa Gleadowe's Organising Exhibitions, (Arts Council of Great Britain, 1975), an outline of this organisation's methods. Twenty years later, the breadth and depth of experience in regional museums and galleries could be tapped and shared, so contributors from across the country wrote chapters for Touring Exhibitions, the Touring Exhibitions Group's Manual of Good Practice (ed. Mike Sixsmith, Butterworth-Heinemann, 1995 ISBN 0-7506-2518-X).

TEG also participated in devising the complementary Standards for Touring Exhibitions (Museums & Galleries Commission, 1995). These guidelines then formed the basis of the minimum standards to which, by virtue of their membership, members are expected to adhere and/or aspire.

== Marketplace ==
Another consequence of the closure of the MGC's unit was an increased emphasis on the exchange of information about exhibitions available for hire. Many museums and galleries were beginning to tour their exhibitions, but they needed to locate venues as early as possible in the planning stages in order to set their budgets. In many cases, their existing contacts were informal and unstructured and they did not know the staff in more distant venues where their exhibitions might be better placed in the interests of the widest possible distribution. As a result, in 1995 the Touring Exhibitions Group began a series of Marketplaces which were designed to give people involved in exhibitions - venues as well as organisers, small as well as large, in all disciplines - to network, meet, put faces to names, renew old contacts and foster the mutual trust that was essential for effective collaboration. The events provide an informal environment where possible bookings can be discussed and negotiated. They are one-day events, usually accompanied by a seminar on a topical subject, and each event takes place in a different part of the country to make it possible for the staff from smaller venues to attend at least once in a while. The venues have been:

1995, National Museum of Wales, Cardiff.
1996, City Art Centre Edinburgh.
1997, Croydon Clocktower.
1999, Bonington Gallery, Nottingham.
2000, Victoria Art Gallery Bath.
2001, Tullie House Museum & Art Gallery, Carlisle.
2002, National Portrait Gallery, London.
2003, Gas Hall, Birmingham.
2004, Collins Gallery, Glasgow.
2005, Millennium Galleries, Sheffield.
2006, Rugby Museum and Art Gallery.
2007, Discovery Centre, Newcastle upon Tyne.
2008, Merseyside Maritime Museum, Liverpool.
2010, Leeds Museum.
2011, British Museum, London.

== X ==
Networking face-to-face at a Marketplace might be the best way to buy and sell exhibitions on the circuit, but not everyone can get to a one-day event that takes place only once a year in a different part of the country. Consequently, in 1997 the Touring Exhibitions Group started to publish an exhibitions bulletin that was designed to complement the Marketplace, by providing a simple listing in which members could advertise their touring exhibitions and/or could find exhibitions for their programmes. Two years later, as a result of sponsorship, it upgraded this informal publication into a proper catalogue called X. This was mailed free to members twice a year, in Spring and Autumn (non-members could buy it at cost). X not only listed details of tours that were already under way and available for hire, but also set out ideas for exhibitions and invitations for new collaborations. It complemented - and eventually supplanted - a range of bulletins, each of which covered a discipline (such as the crafts) or a sector (such as museums) or a geographical area (such as museums service). In its day, it was the one-stop, multi-disciplinary listing of the broad diversity of exhibitions touring in the U.K. At the time, it was envisaged that it would be complemented by web-site listings - but not, as happened, that the website would make a printed catalogue wholly redundant, see below.

== Finance ==
The Touring Exhibitions Group is not registered as a charity, but it takes seriously its accountability to its membership. Its accounts are scrutinised each year by an external accountant, and are presented to the following Annual General Meeting for approval by the membership. In the financial year beginning 1 April 2010, TEG's turnover was £24,246, of which 68% was represented by income from subscriptions from about 300 ‘ordinary’ members and a dozen corporate members. Subscriptions provide the financial bedrock on which TEG's structure and activities stand, and maintaining and expanding the membership base is a constant pre-occupation of the Executive Committee. These subscriptions cover the costs of the secretariat and other overheads, so most of TEG's programmes are supported by earned income, by sponsorship and/or by grant-aid. Earned income includes the fees paid by delegates to attend a Marketplace or a seminar. The first three marketplaces were sponsored by Wingate & Johnston (now part of the Constantine Group of packers and shippers) and by grant-aid. Because the event is peripatetic, it is vulnerable to differences in policies and priorities between regional agencies, and lack of grant-aid led to the cancellation of the event for 1998. It was only when Panelock Display Systems Ltd (a manufacturer of movable walls for museum and gallery use) took over sponsorship that the event had the financial backing which guaranteed its continuity. Panelock's sponsorship of the Marketplace continued until 2005 when its funding was shifted towards the website (where it continues to date). In 2010-11, TESS Demountable (makers of demountable showcases) began to sponsor TEG's seminar programme. Other, more flexible forms of support have been tried, e.g. a corporate member sharing a stand but paying the costs of TEG's attendance at a trade fair. Public funding bodies have also supported TEG's activities on a project-by-project basis. The Arts Council of England, Crafts Council and Museums & Galleries Commission funded the 1995 publication, Touring Exhibitions, and 10 years later the Arts Councils of England, Scotland and Wales subsidised its complete revision and adaptation to an on-line format.

== Esmée Fairbairn Foundation ==
Between 2004 and 2008, the Esmée Fairbairn Foundation (EFF) gave the Touring Exhibitions Group a total of £103,245 for a three-year programme to develop the organisation. The programme was designed partly as a series of finite, stand-alone projects and partly as programmes that could continue if they were able to generate sufficient income (or if they attracted further funding). The emphasis was on giving TEG a ‘step up’, a chance to expand its activities and, by attracting new members and increased income, put the organisation on a new level of activity. However, there was also provision for ‘stepping down’ again, and an exit strategy was as important a part of the planning process as the steps to gear up to the new level of activity. One of the less expensive items in the EFF package was the opportunity for a structured review of the organisation, which allowed a committee which often was not able to “see the wood for the trees” to step back and take a hard look at what it was doing and how it was doing it. Another relatively minor expenditure was that on membership development, to allow a strategy to be both developed and – no certain thing for a small organisation – implemented. By far the most significant activity (representing 38% of the grant) was a major research project which reviewed the context in which touring was taking place. Exhibition provision had changed dramatically since the previous national survey of touring policy (Where Do We Go Next? Graham Marchant Associates, 1992/3). In particular, Lottery funding had encouraged the building of new museums, arts centres and exhibition galleries, and the upgrading and enlargement of existing ones. Sally Fort carried out research over three years, and the full text of her report is available on the Group's website, with an executive summary, Mapping the Touring Landscape, available in hard copy. Unfortunately this valuable report was obsolete within a couple of years, as a result of the seismic shift caused by H.M. Government's Comprehensive Spending Review in 2010.

== Website ==
Another of the one-off projects funded by the Esmée Fairbairn Foundation was the re-design of the Touring Exhibitions Group's website. Keeping a numerous and dispersed membership informed about the policies and activities of the committee that was working on its behalf is a challenge for any organisation. For one with limited resources, communication was difficult because of the cost of producing and mailing regular newsletters. There is the opportunity at Annual General Meetings for members to question and challenge the outgoing committee on its achievements and failures, but an AGM is retrospective, only once a year and attended by a small proportion of the membership. A more continuous, two-way interaction between the Committee and the membership is now possible, thanks to the explosive development of the internet, which has had a profound impact on the way that TEG functions. As late as 1997, the exchange of drafts by email was thought worthy of mention in that year's annual report, not just for its speed and economy but also because the drafts were tested in a wider consultation with those members who had e-mail addresses (by no means a universal condition in 1997). Ten years later, monthly e-newsletters, simple and inexpensive to produce and distribute, provided a regular channel of information to the membership. TEG's first website went on-line in 1999. It was written on a shoestring, with help in kind from Panelock. Like all first websites, it was tentative and experimental, testing what such a site should provide and how it might be done, with new features added as and when the need was recognised. By 2003, this structure (with its superstructure of add-ons) was creaking at the seams, so a radical overhaul and redesign by the website designers, Red Leader Industries, became one of the stand-alone projects funded by EFF. This second website gives members easy access to news and resources. At the most formal level, minutes from committee meetings are posted on the website so that members are able to follow the work of the Committee and - if they feel moved to - provide comment and influence policy. At a different level, the website includes a database which allows members to use different criteria (subject, period, size, etc.) to search for exhibitions available for hire. In the event, this database proved to be so effective – simple to use and with immediate results - that it made the publication ‘X’ wholly redundant, and it has now been replaced by a twice-yearly magazine, Exchange, explicitly a marketing aid for TEG events.

== Handbook ==
At the same time that the Touring Exhibitions Group was in discussion with EFF, applications were also being made to the Arts Councils of England, Scotland and Wales for the costs of revising the 1995 manual of good practice, Touring Exhibitions. Indeed, EFF agreed to fund the restructuring of the website - which included the redesign of the manual as a resource available on-line - partly on the basis that the Arts Councils supported the textual revisions. The latter included updates by previous contributors wherever possible, but also revisions of existing chapters by new contributors where necessary, as well as completely new chapters to reflect changing priorities and new developments over the ten years since the book was published. The on-line Handbook was launched as part of the new website in December 2005. Initially the Handbook was located within the public pages of the website, but after a year it was moved to the members’ part of the site, following a couple of ‘raids’ which had downloaded the whole Handbook. The Committee felt that it had to know who was accessing the Handbook so that it could control any copyright infringements. Users are allowed to download as long as it is for their own use for organising, touring and promoting exhibitions. Downloading for reproduction, especially for commercial reasons, was expressly forbidden but was impossible to control with free access. Restricting the Handbook to members might simply be a case of closing a door after the horse had bolted. Perhaps it was also closing the wrong door. After all, limiting access has made the commercial exploitation of a downloaded version more likely, and it might have been better to maintain the Handbook as a free resource but subject to registration.

== Seminars ==
From its inception, the Touring Exhibitions Group had organised workshops, seminars and conferences, sometimes to do with practical and technical matters and at other times as part of its lobbying role. Each seminar was usually a one-day event, and took place at an appropriate venue in the U.K. It was also a one-off event that depended on the enthusiasm of the particular committee member who was managing it. The difficulty for TEG was imparting continuity and maintaining momentum, so that its members could expect a regular programme of several seminars a year. Once again, EFF funding provided the answer, allowing the appointment of a seminar co-ordinator. Unfortunately Jasleen Kandhari only managed the seminars for two years before a new job tempted her across the Atlantic. Her departure put the brakes on the programme just at the time when it ought to have been building up momentum and even becoming self-financing, and it was not until 2010 that TEG was able to appoint a replacement, in this case with sponsorship from TESS Demountable. This appointment was not renewed after the first year, in large part because cutbacks in public spending appeared to undermine the viability of the seminar programme. As a result, TEG is undertaking in 2011 a training needs analysis of its membership, to identify where the skills gaps are and how TEG can help to plug them.

== The future ==
H.M. Government's Comprehensive Spending Review in 2010 has led to significant reductions in public spending. An indication of the seismic shift in the landscape of cultural provision in England is the fact that Arts Council England, with its emphasis on the live and performing arts, is to absorb the very distinct functions of the Museums, Libraries and Archives Council. Local authorities are reducing programmes, cutting staff and even closing whole services, and the situation might be equally bleak for a membership organisation that depends so much on subscription income. On the other hand, where resources are insufficient to allow galleries to organise all their exhibitions themselves, the economic situation must push them towards an increased level of collaboration, and perhaps the Touring Exhibitions Group becomes even more necessary and important in hard times, to help to maintain standards, to facilitate the exchange of information of what is available, and to lobby for a type of service which is self-evidently cost-effective.
