= Castlemaine Harbour =

Estuary and nature reserve / designated area in County Kerry, Ireland

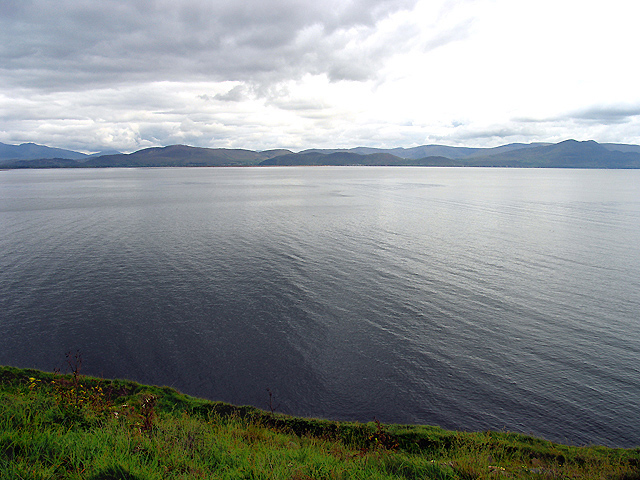
- Castlemaine Harbour near Inch

- Location within Ireland
- Location: County Kerry
- Coordinates: 52°07′41″N 9°56′38″W
- Area: 2,281 acres (923.09 ha)
- Operator: National Parks and Wildlife Service (Ireland)

Designations

Ramsar Wetland
- Designated: 30 May 1990
- Reference no.: 470

Castlemaine Harbour is a Ramsar site, Special Area of Conservation, Special Protection Area and national nature reserve of approximately 2,281 acres (9.23 km^{2}) located in County Kerry, Ireland.

== Features ==
Castlemaine Harbour was legally protected as a national nature reserve by the Irish government in 1990. The area is also listed as a Special Area of Conservation and a Special Protection Area. In 1990, the site was also declared Ramsar site number 470.

The Harbour is at the head of Dingle Bay, and is the estuary of two rivers. The reserve includes salt marshes, sandbanks, and mudflats which are protected from the sea by a large system of dunes. One of the four largest Zostera beds in Ireland is found in the Harbour's mudflats, and these provide food for a wide variety of water birds which overwinter there, including the light-bellied Brent goose, Branta bernicla hrota. Among the birds recorded on the site are sanderlings, oystercatchers, red-throated divers, and greenshanks. The natterjack toad, an endangered species in Ireland, is also found in the reserve.
