= Inch, County Kerry =

Townland and beach in County Kerry, Ireland

Coordinates: 52.1427°N 9.9810°W

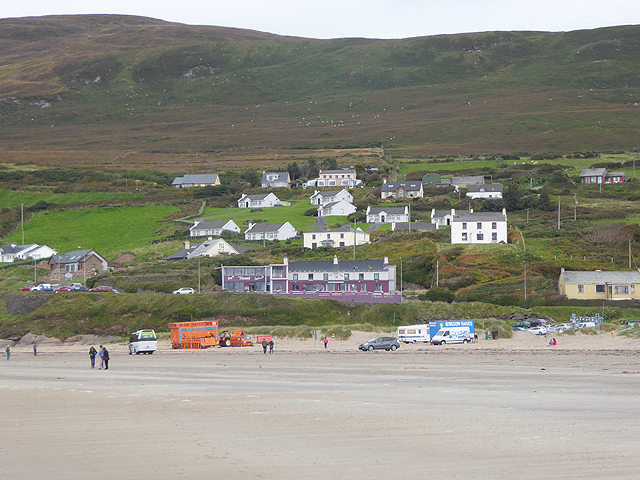
Inch and Inch Strand in County Kerry

Inch (Irish: Inse, meaning 'river meadow') is a small coastal settlement and townland on the Dingle Peninsula in County Kerry, Ireland. Inch Strand, in Inch townland, is on a long sand spit and dune system which reaches into Dingle Bay. The R561 regional road passes through the area.

Evidence of ancient settlement in the area includes a number of midden, ringfort and ecclesiastical enclosure sites in Inch and Inch East townlands. The graveyard enclosure, in Inch East, contains a ruined single-cell church which dates to at least the 13th century.

Inch Strand, also known as Inch Beach, is a spit which is 5 km in length and, together with its dune system, forms part of the Special Area of Conservation at Castlemaine Harbour.
