= Dingle Bay =

Bay in County Kerry, Ireland

Coordinates: 52°04′N 10°11′W

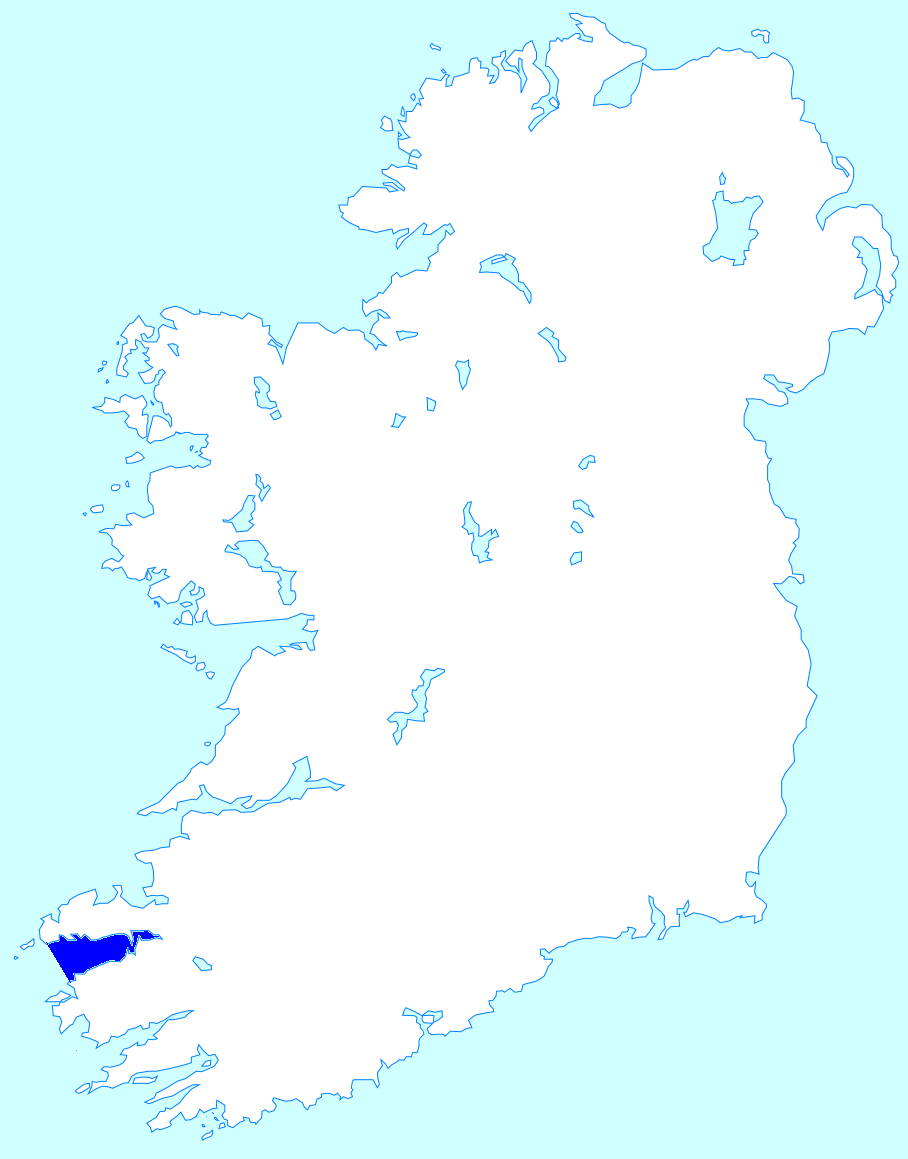
Dingle Bay

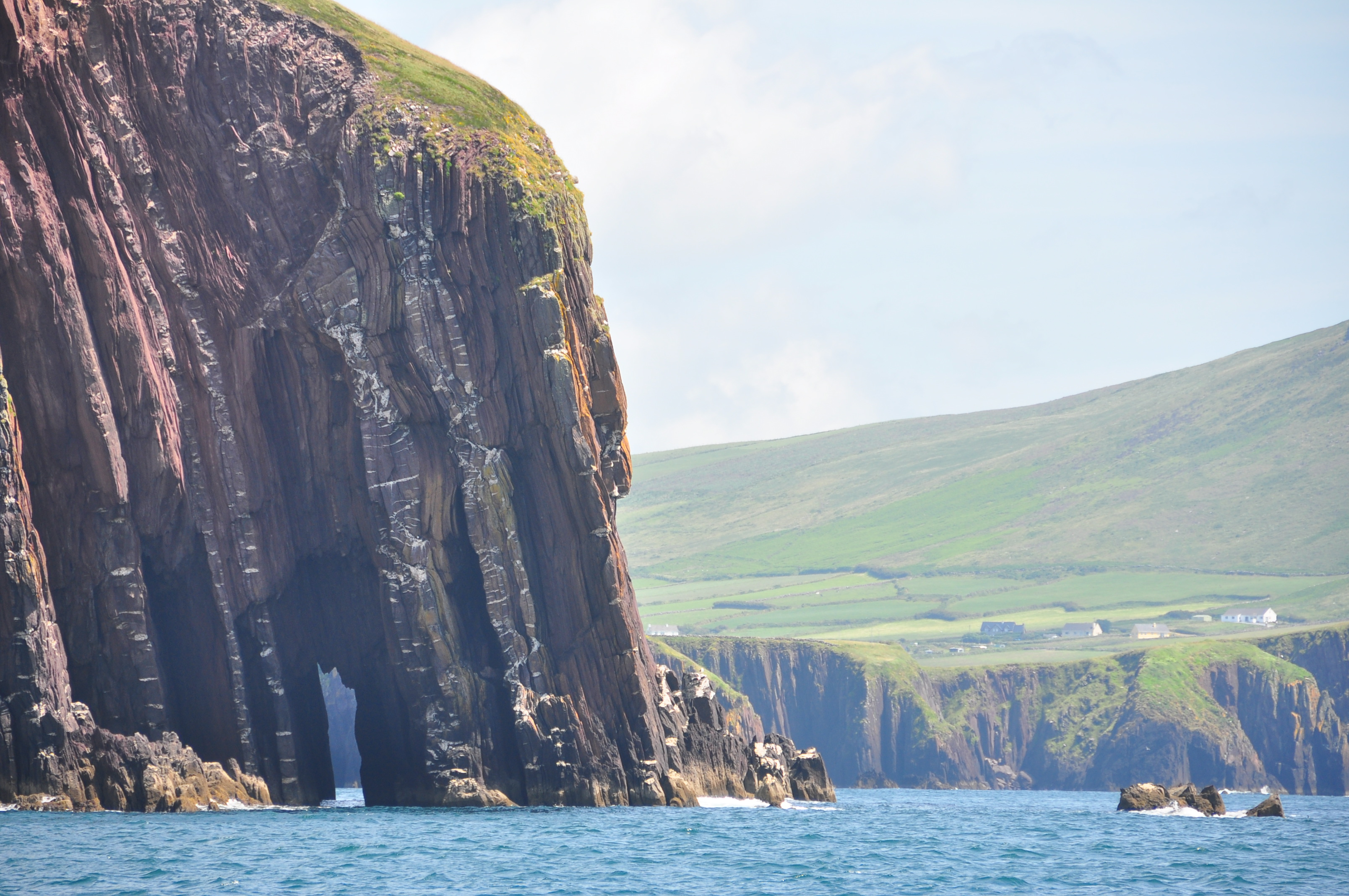
Dingle Bay

Dingle Bay (Bá an Daingin in Irish) is a bay located in County Kerry, western Ireland. The outer parts of the Dingle Peninsula and Dingle Bay mark one of the westernmost points of mainland Ireland. The harbour town of Dingle lies on the north side of the bay.

== Geography ==
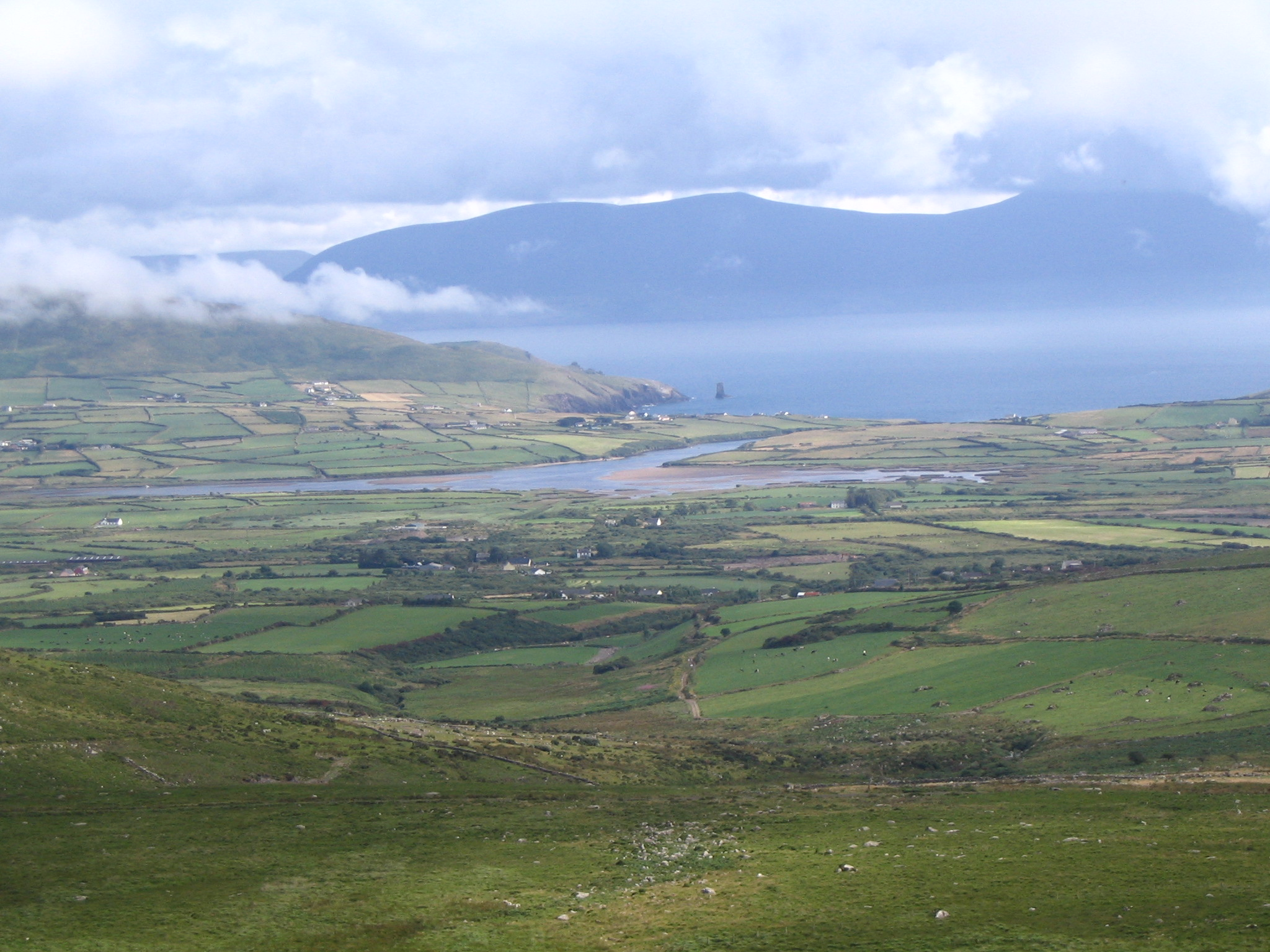
View of Dingle Bay

The bay runs approximately 40 km (25 mi) from northeast to southwest into the Atlantic Ocean. It is approximately 3 km (1.9 mi) wide at the head, and 20 km (12 mi) wide at the entrance. It is flanked on the north by the Dingle Peninsula, and on the south by the Iveragh Peninsula. The River Maine enters the bay at its head. The harbour town of Dingle lies on the north side of the bay. Other settlements overlooking the bay include Ventry, Ballymeentrant, Beenbane, and Kinard, and Annascaul and Glenbeigh lie near the bay. Killorglin lies at the head of the bay at the mouth of the River Laune.

There are no notable islands within the bay, but towards the head, several peninsulas, in particular Inch Strand, extend a significant distance across its width. Part of the bay is a protected lowland estuary with tidal flats. On the south side of the bay, on the Iveragh Peninsula, there is a bird sanctuary which is an important breeding site for the red-billed chough. This area has cliffs, topped with grassland and heathland.

== History ==
In the 19th century, Dingle Bay was rich in fish stocks and Dingle had a competent and efficient workforce. This was largely due to the efforts of the "Society for bettering the condition of the poor of Ireland", and the improvements they made in coastal fisheries in Kerry. The bay was said to abound in pilchard, herring, cod, hake and ling, and the boats often landed exotic fish that were more associated with the Mediterranean region, Portugal and Spain.

Dingle Bay was the first feature of Europe that aviator Charles Lindbergh encountered in 1927 during his pioneering 33-hour transatlantic flight in the Spirit of St. Louis monoplane from New York to Paris. It is enacted in the 1957 film The Spirit of St. Louis, in which Lindbergh was portrayed by Jimmy Stewart who waves to the villagers of Dingle Bay as he flies over it in jubilation.
