= Dunquin =

Village in County Kerry, Ireland

Dunquin Dún Chaoin
- Village
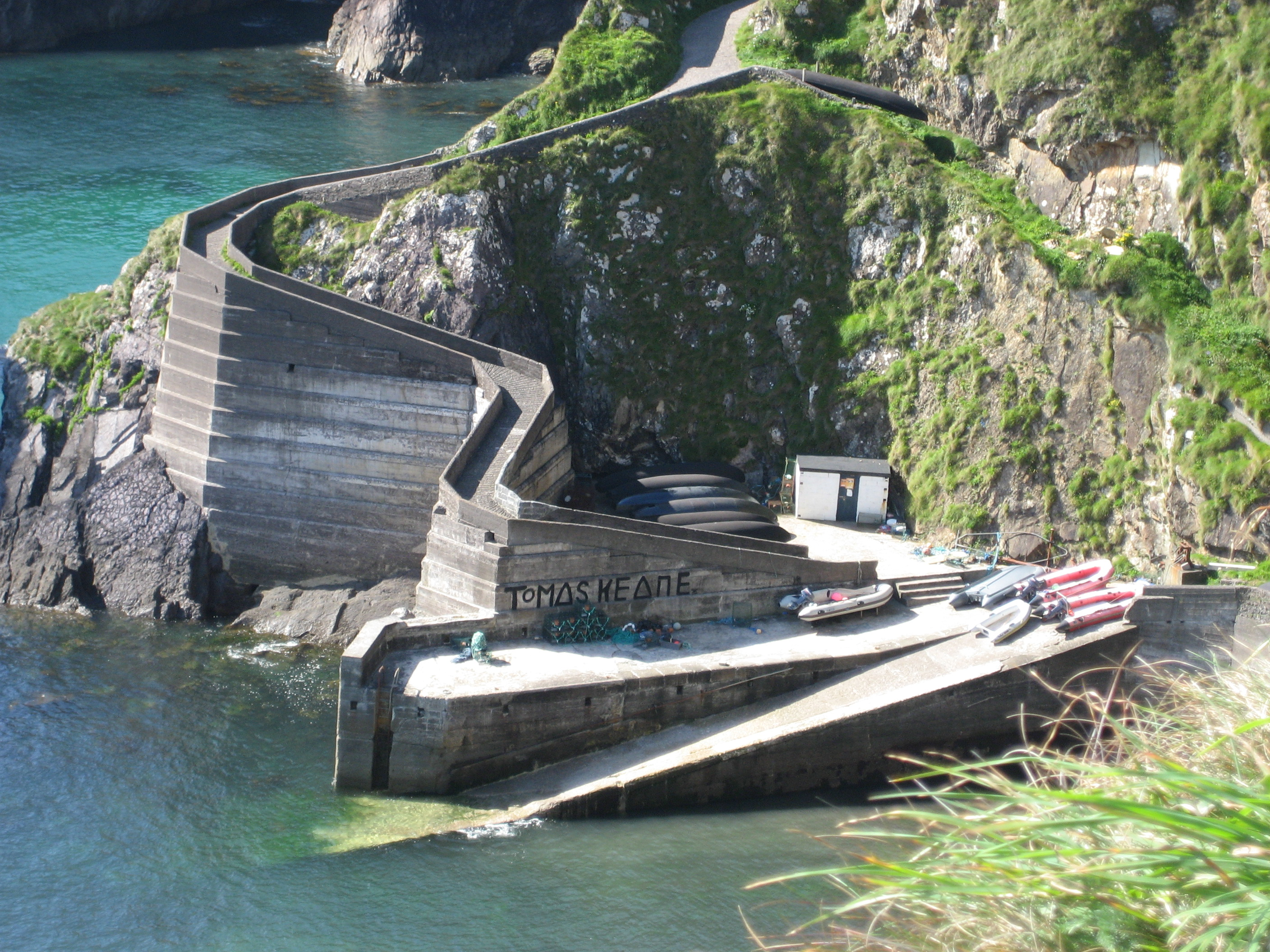
- Dún Chaoin pier

- Location in Ireland
- Coordinates: 52°08′01″N 10°27′16″W
- Country: Ireland
- Province: Munster
- County: County Kerry
- Barony: Corkaguiny
- Peninsula and District: Corca Dhuibhne

Population (2011)
  - Total: 160
- Irish Grid Reference: Q320008
- Dún Chaoin is the only official name.

Dún Chaoin (Irish, meaning 'pleasant fort' [ˌd̪ˠuːn̪ˠ ˈxiːnʲ]), unofficially anglicised as Dunquin, is a Gaeltacht village in the west of County Kerry in the south-west of Ireland. Dunquin lies at the most westerly tip of the Dingle Peninsula (Irish: Corca Dhuibhne), overlooking the Blasket Islands. At 10°27'16"W, it is the most westerly settlement of Ireland and of Eurasia, excluding Iceland. Nearby Dunmore Head is the most westerly point of mainland Ireland. The town is linked to Dingle via the R559 regional road. It is also part of the civil parish of the same name. In summer, a ferry connects the village with the main island of the Blasket Islands. The village is located at the western end of the Barony of Corkaguiny (the name 'Corkaguiny' being the anglicised version of Corca Dhuibhne).

There is dramatic cliff scenery, with a view of the Blasket Islands, where Peig Sayers lived. A museum in the village tells the story of the Blaskets and the lives of the people who lived there including the well-known writers of the island, which includes Sayers, Tomás Ó Criomhthain, and Muiris Ó Súilleabháin. In 1588, when the Spanish Armada returned via Ireland, many ships sought shelter in the Blasket Sound — the area between Dún Chaoin and the Islands — and some were wrecked there. A memorial stands on the cliffs overlooking the site. Dunquin is located on the Dingle Way, which is a 179 km circular walking trail which takes in much of the Dingle Peninsula.

== The Village ==
A documentary film, titled The Village, was made during 1967–68 by Paul Hockings and Mark McCarty. It was shot almost entirely in Dunquin and the Great Blasket. It was the first film to be completed in the style that came to be known as "observational cinema".

== Ryan's Daughter ==
Scenes from the 1970 film Ryan's Daughter, based on a screenplay by Robert Bolt and directed by David Lean, were shot at Coumineole Beach and Ceathrú (Caharhoo) in Dunquin. The town's then-struggling economy was largely revived by the production of this film and subsequent tourism. Its marginal condition beforehand had been documented in the 1968 ethnographic film The Village.

== Scoil Dhún Chaoin ==
Scoil Náisiúnta Naomh Gobnait, Dún Chaoin, was first opened in 1914. Before that, the school was located across the road in Baile Bhiocáire. During the 1970s, Scoil Dhún Chaoin was the subject of a countywide and national campaign which featured protest marches, sit-ins and arrests. A government decision to close the school was strongly opposed by the local community and, following almost three years of closure, the school was reopened in 1973.

== CAMRA ==
The British Campaign for Real Ale (CAMRA) was founded in Kruger's Bar in Dunquin in 1971.

== People ==
- Peig Sayers (1873–1958) Irish language memoirist and seanchaí
- Cáit Feiritéar (1916–2005) folklorist and seanchaí
- Pádraig Monsignor de Brún (1889–1960), Roman Catholic priest and Irish-language scholar from County Tipperary
- Máire Mhac an tSaoi (1922–2021), Irish-language poet. Mhac an tSaoi spent much of her childhood visiting her uncle, Monsignor de Brún, and chose to use Dún Chaoin's dialect, folksongs and folklore as the basis for her poetry
- Muireann Nic Amhlaoibh (b. 1978), seán-nos singer and performer of Irish traditional music, was born in the Aran Islands, but grew up in Dún Chaoin. She was the lead singer for Danú, and from 2016 on she has been half of the electronica duo Aeons

== Gallery ==
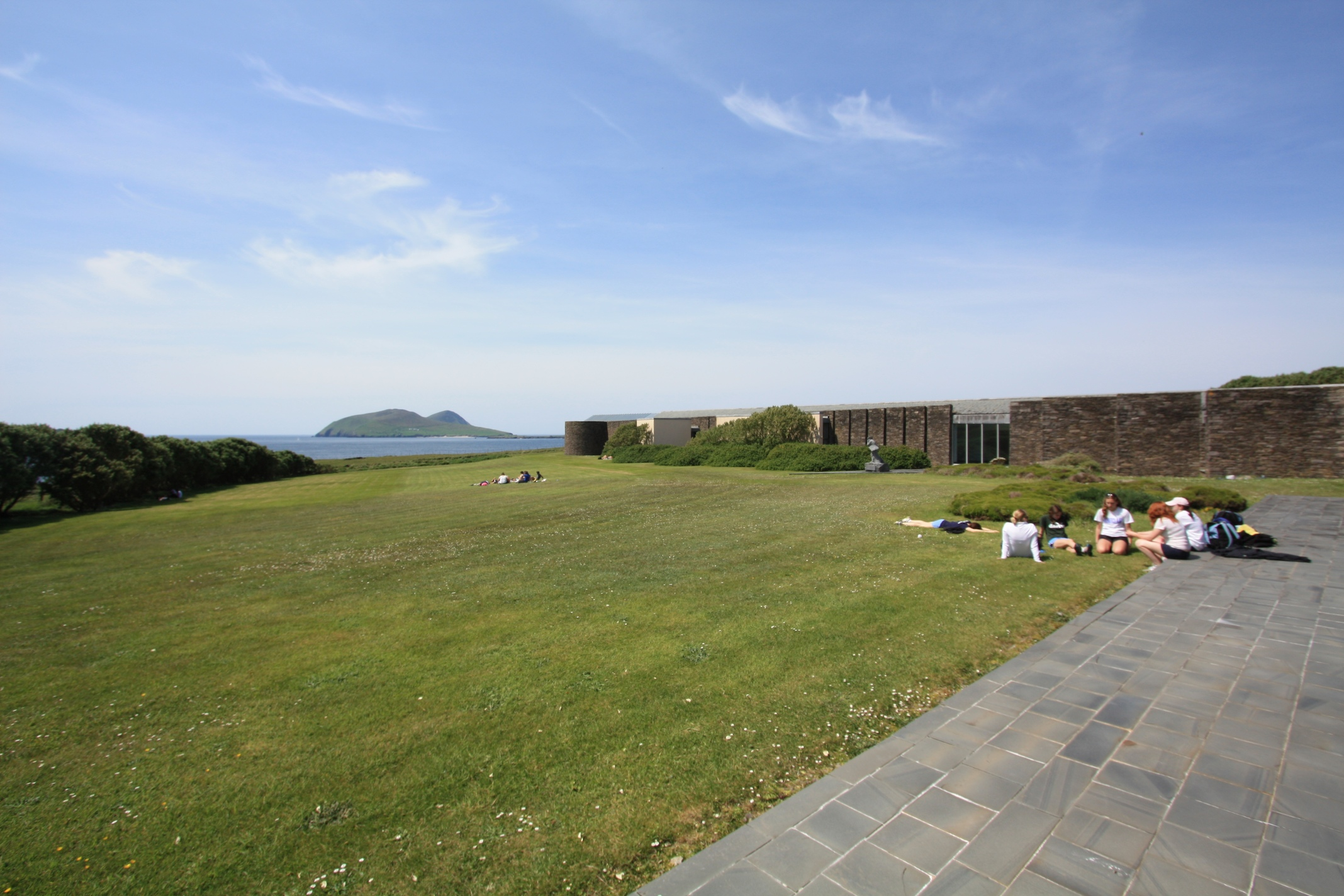
The Blasket Centre with the Blasket Islands visible in the distance

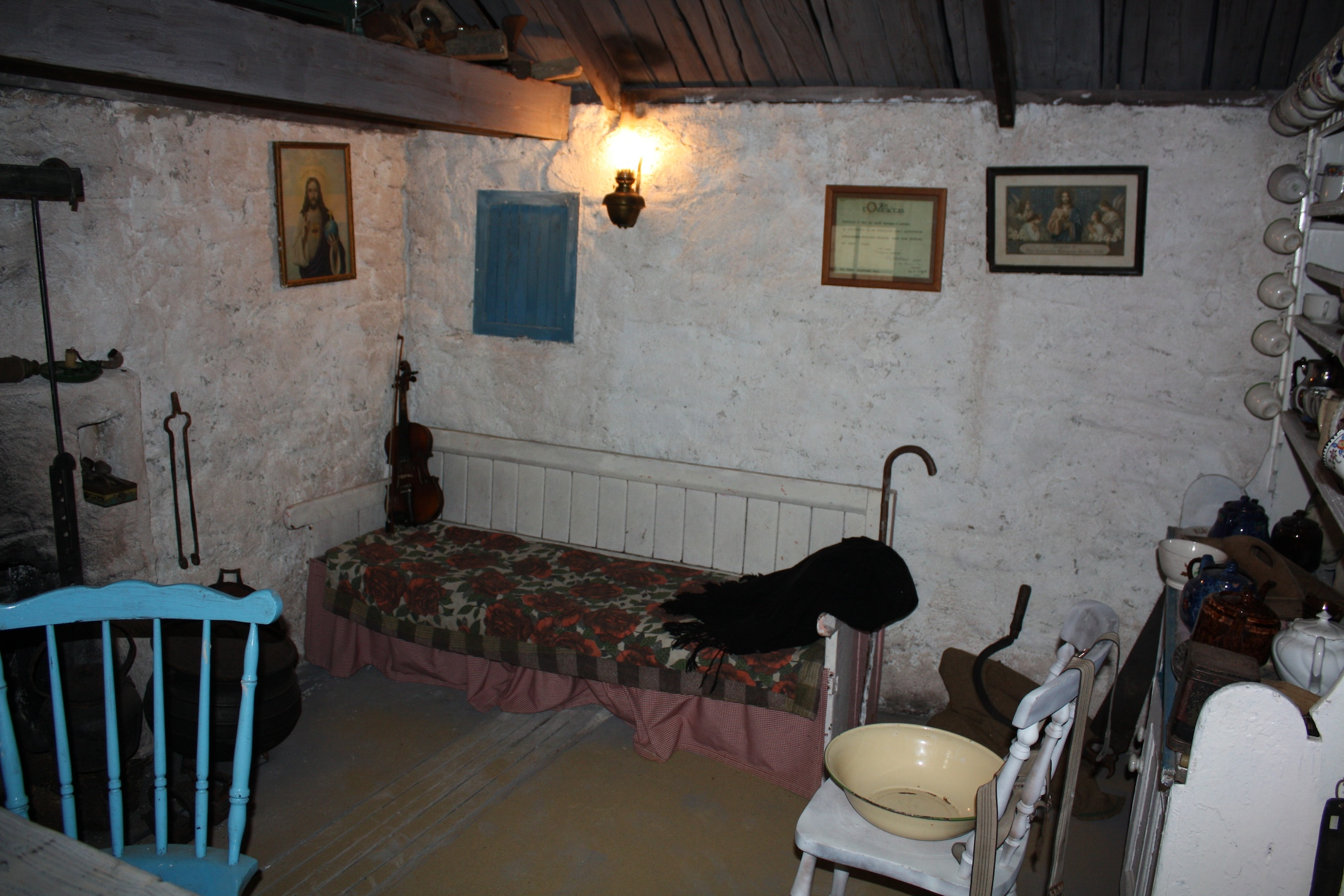
Replica of a traditional Great Blasket cottage

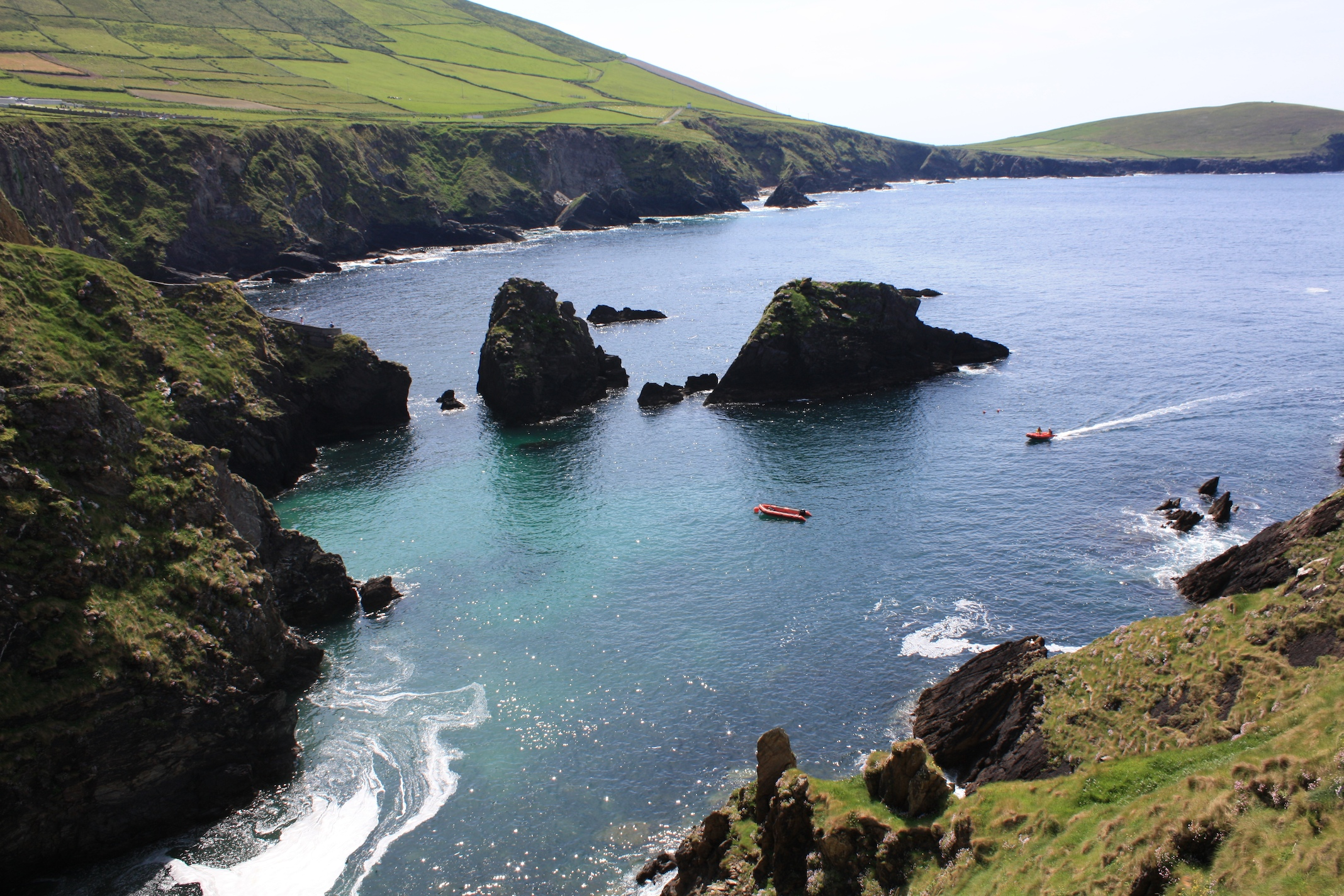
Jagged coastline near Dunquin Pier

== See also ==
- Munster Irish
- List of towns and villages in the Republic of Ireland
