= Rinn an Chaisleáin =

- Castle Point
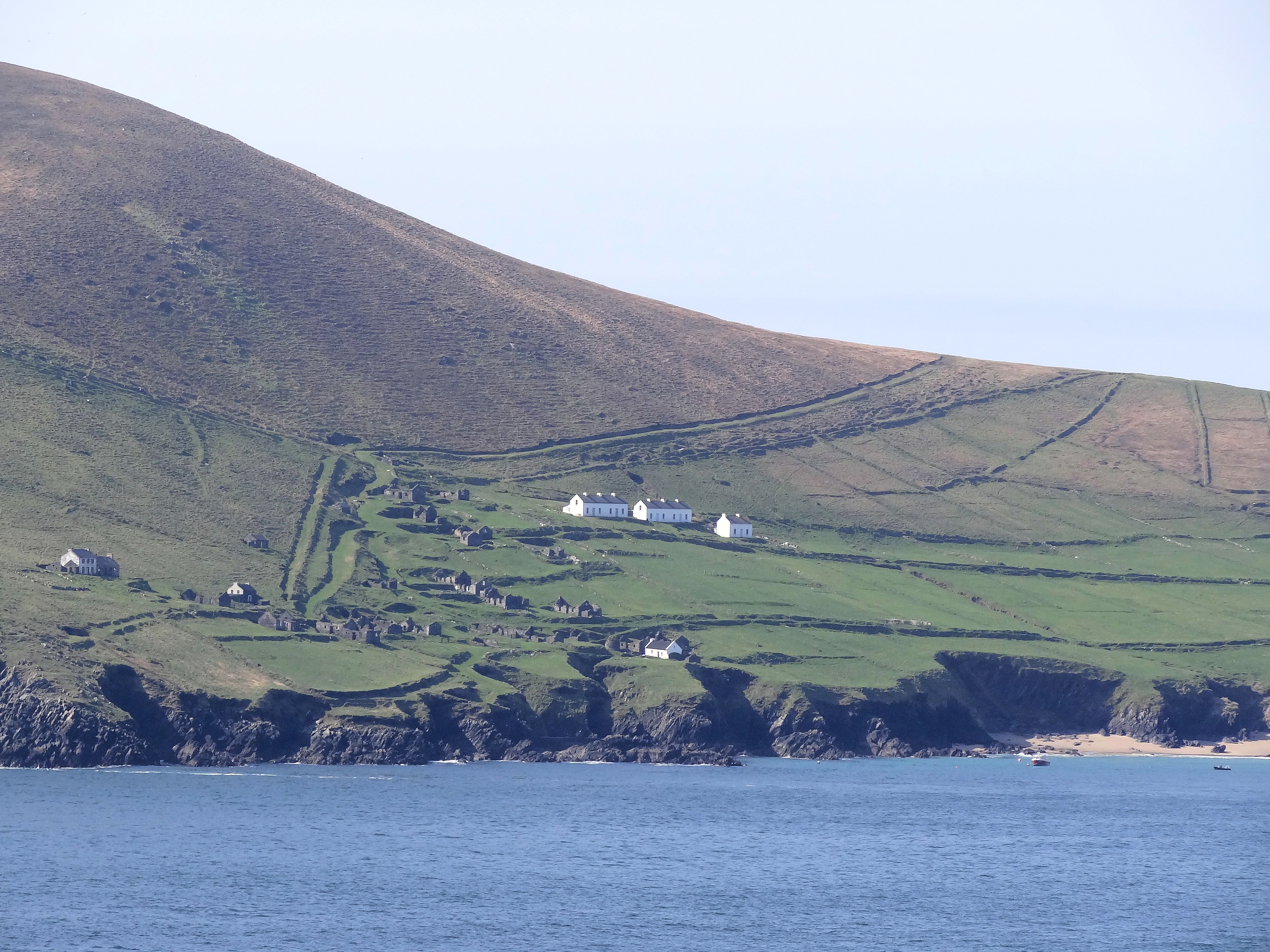
- Great Blasket's lower village, with Castle Point in the foreground

- Location within Ireland
- 52.105299°N 10.511022°W
- Type: castle site, cillín
- Location: Great Blasket Island, County Kerry, Ireland

National monument of Ireland
- Official name: Rínn an Chaisleáin Church site
- Reference no.: 63

Rinn an Chaisleáin or Castle Point is a National Monument on Great Blasket Island, Ireland.

== Location ==
Rinn an Chaisleáin is located directly north of Great Blasket's "Lower Village", to the west of the harbour.

== History ==
From the end of the 13th Century the Norman-Irish Feiritéar (Ferriter) family leased the Blaskets from the Earls of Desmond (apparently in exchange for two hawks per year), and later from the Boyle Earls of Cork. Rinn an Chaisleáin was originally the site of a castle built by the Ferriters.

In 1840 a Protestant "soup-school" was built using the stones from the castle ruins; it closed in 1852.

Rinn an Chaisleáin remained in use as a calluragh (unconsecrated burial ground). All island families traced their ancestry to either Dunquin or Ventry, and so were buried on the mainland to rest with their families. In times of bad weather the island would be cut off from the mainland, and corpses remained unburied, sometimes for weeks. In extremis, bodies would be buried at Rinn an Chaisleáin. It was also used for the burial of unbaptised infants, suicides and shipwrecked sailors.

Some of the burial sites are marked by stones.
