= Irish folk music (2000–2009) =

== Recordings ==
- 2000 "From the Beginning...Chieftains 1 to 4" (The Chieftains)
- 2000 "Think Before You Think" (Danú)
- 2000 "Water From The Well" (The Chieftains)
- 2001 "Somewhere Along the Road" (Cathie Ryan)
- 2001 "The Wide World Over – 40th Anniversary Celebration" (The Chieftains)
- 2002 "Down the Old Plank Road – The Nashville Sessions" (The Chieftains)
- 2003 "Redwood" (Lúnasa)
- 2003 "Further Down the Old Plank Road" (The Chieftains)
- 2004 "The Kinnitty Sessions" (Lúnasa)
- 2005 "Live From Dublin: A Tribute To Derek Bell" (The Chieftains)
- 2005 "The Farthest Wave" (Cathie Ryan)
- 2005 "Hey Dreamer" (John Spillane)
- 2005 "Wayward Son"(John Doyle)
- 2006 "The Essential Chieftains" (The Chieftains)
