= Séamus Barra Ó Súilleabháin =

Séamus Barra Ó Súilleabháin is a Kerry poet, writer, haiku artist, and rapper who performs hip hop songs under the name Súil Amháin (One Eye). He is one of the most prominent of the new generation of Irish language poets.

== Life ==
Ó Súilleabháin was born in London, England but raised in Listowel, Co. Kerry. He attended school in Knocknagoshel, Co. Kerry, for a year as the family moved back and forth between the two countries. When he moved back to north Kerry, he spoke with an English accent. “I had a different understanding of my surroundings than the other kids at school,” he said. “I was analyzing everything around me.”

Ó Súilleabháin won the All-Ireland Poetry Slam in 2011.

He conducted doctoral research on the writing of Mícheál Ó Gaoithín (“Maidhc an File”), son of Peig Sayers, who was referenced in Ó Súilleabháin's rapping.

He was writer-in-residence at St John's Centre in Listowel in 2022.

== Identification ==
Ó Súilleabháin is one of the leading poets of the new generation of Irish-language poetry. The poet David Wheatley said of him: "You rarely find a new poet as significant as Séamus Barra Ó Súilleabháin. He is a 'Shaman', without a doubt".

Ó Súilleabháin calls himself a "post-Gaeltacht" poet.

Although urban and internet-speak are prominent in Ó Súilleabháin's poems, he practices Munster Gaelic, especially in his more recent poems. He has spent periods living in Corca Dhuibhne and worked at the Blascaoid Centre and as a guide on the Great Blasket.

== Poetry ==
In 2016, Cló Iar-Chonnacht published a collection of his poetry, Beatha Dhónaill Dhuibh. According to RTÉ, this collection explores questions big and small, the new and the old, the living and the dead. Robert McMillen, Irish language editor at The Irish News, said, "Whatever method of narration Séamus chooses, it is exciting, energetic." His poetry has been published in Comhar, The Willow's Whisper: A Transatlantic Compilation of Poetry from Ireland and Native America, and articles on meoneile.ie and elsewhere.

== Music ==
- He released Muca – a hip hop track with Craos (Séamus Barra Ó Súilleabháin and Rob Mulhern).
- “An fhuil – Aeons”, on which Séamus Barra Ó Súilleabháin was heard.
- “Go Beo go Deo na nDeor” was a song that was shortlisted for the Pan Celtic Festival in 2015 — written by Enda Reilly and Séamus Barra Ó Súilleabháin.
- Charlie O'Brien and Séamus Barra Ó Súilleabháin released a soundtrack for 'Macalla Chill Áirne' with Trouble or Fortune Records.
- In 2021, Súil Amháin supported Kneecap on their Occupied 6 Tour.
- He participated in the artistic multimedia video Ériu by Body&Soul. The segment on which he featured was called “Alltar”.

=== EP ===
Séamus Barr released an EP in 2019 featuring six newly composed poems and songs. The tracks were written by Séamus Barra and produced by Eóghan Harris.

=== Video poems ===
In Sráid Éigse, recorded as part of the Other Voices cultural festival, modern presentations are seen alongside indigenous metrics, particularly by the Listowel poet Uilliam Ó Leannáin. The video claims that 'Sráid-Éigse' is a correspondence between the poets of the information age and the antiquarians of 18th century manuscripts. The video “Raithneach” was nominated for song of the year and video of the year at the 2019 Nós Music Awards. Recorded and edited by Seán T. Ó Meallaigh. This video was made by REIC in collaboration with Áras Scríbhneoirí na hÉireann, Foras na Gaeilge and Bliain na Gaeilge.

=== Súil Amháin (2020) ===
In 2020, another project of his mixed hip-hop music with the lyrics of Séamus Barra. In the midst of the 2020 lockdown, Áine Ní Chíobháin asked Súil Amháin to contribute to a brand new track with producer Bantum for the 'Cogar' showcase held at the Other Voices festival. Three tracks came from Súil Amháin and Bantum:

- Viva Liobarnach - Súil Amháin (produced by Bantum), Music: Bantum, Lyrics: Súil Amháin, Recorded by: Tejo.
- Lá Breá - Súil Amháin, produced by Bantum. Supported by Ealaín na Gaeltachta. Directed by Áine Ní Chíobháin, decorated by Ferg Flannery, recorded by Garsún Eo and walked the beach by Rút Ní Mhurchú.
- Incantation of Féile-Flow Funk, Lyrics by Súil Amháin, Bantum.

=== Short film ===
Charlie O'Brien made a short film called "Macalla Chill Áirne" in 2022 starring Séamus Barra Ó Súilleabháin. It also stars Sean Ó Gairbhí (the sean-nós singer). "Macalla" is a re-creation of a boat trip through the lakes of Killarney before the Great Famine. A bugle was used to emit an echo from the mountain at the end of the trip to Nead an Iolair. Macalla Chill Áirne was shown at the Kerry Film Festival, the Chicago Irish Film Fest and many other events.

=== Inspiration ===
The group Kneecap have stated that they were influenced by the work of Ó Súilleabháin, indeed they refer to it in their first song. Certain aspects can be identified in the work of Séamus Barra himself that were later inspired by Kneecap, the greater emphasis on songs rather than poetry when it came to Shúil Amháin, being one of them.

=== Publications and poems ===
- Arabis [Arabic] – poem in Southword.
- Beatha Dhónaill Dhuibh [The Life of Dónall Dhubh], a collection of poetry, 2016 (Cló Iar-Chonnacht).
- Ón mBarr Aníos [From Above], EP, recordings of a handful of poems 2019, Can You See My Phone?, Elections, Ferns, Sin Cultúr, Teemín Óg, Shark Ólta
- Leprosarium/An Lobharlann.
- Lotríocht.
- 2011 - in the collection, The Willow's Whisper: A Transatlantic Compilation of Poetry from Ireland and Native America Hardcover editor: Jill M. O'Mahony & Mícheál Ó hAodha (Cambridge Scholars Publishing).
- 2015 - in the collection, Poetry Ireland Review 115 (Éigse Éireann /Impress Books).
- 'BREAD NOT PROFITS' Comhar, Séamus Barra Ó Súilleabháin. An account of a play by Mick Finn and other events of the Limerick Soviet.
