= Great Blasket Island =

Island in Ireland

Great Blasket
Native name: An Blascaod Mór
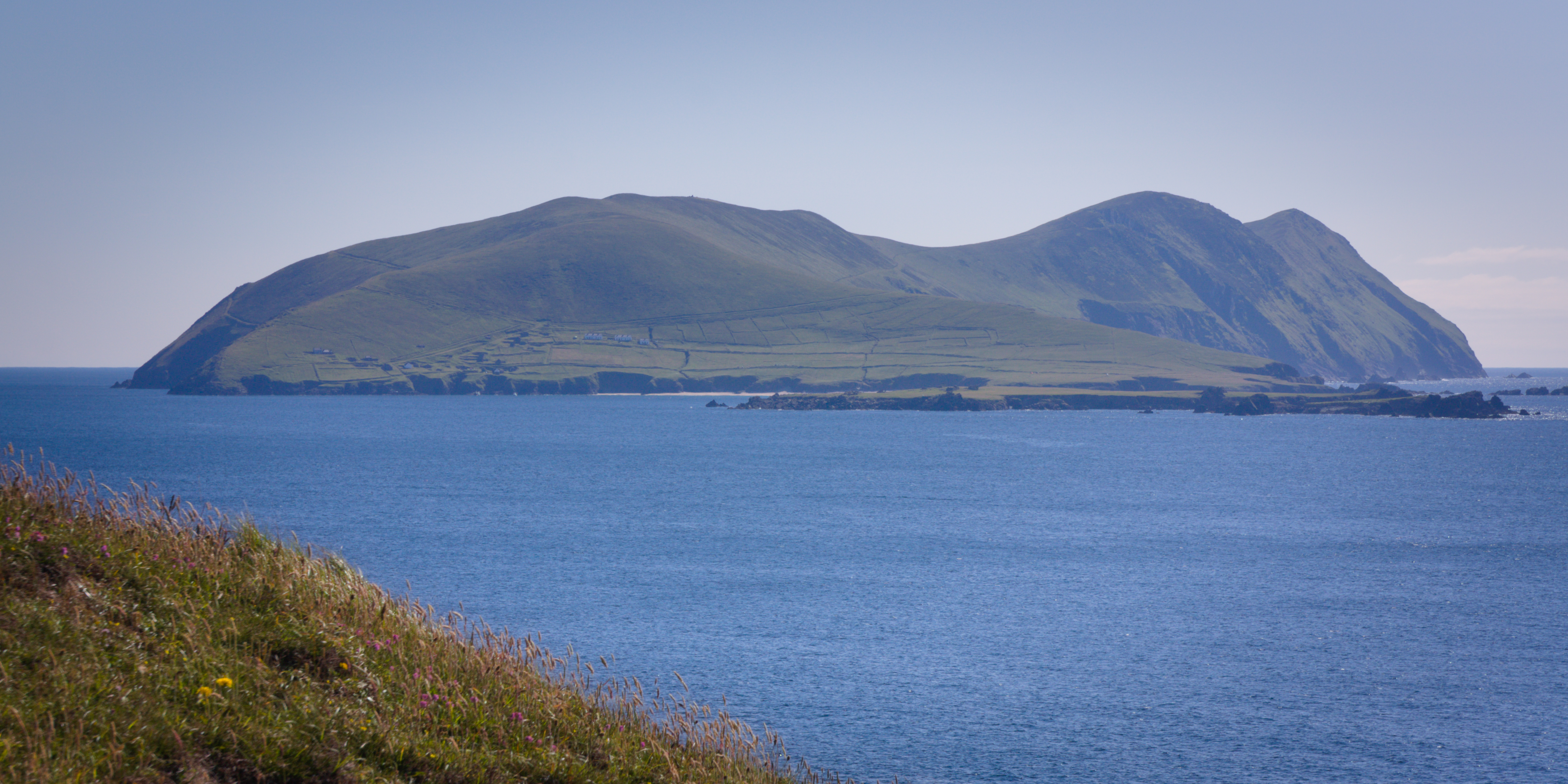
- Great Blasket Island

- Location within island of Ireland

Geography
- Location: Atlantic Ocean
- Coordinates: 52°05′33″N 10°32′33″W
- Archipelago: Blasket Islands
- Major islands: Great Blasket Island, Beginish, Inishnabro, Inishvickillane, Inishtooskert, Tearaght Island
- Area: 1,124 acres (455 ha)
- Highest elevation: 346 m (1135 ft)
- Highest point: An Cró Mór

Administration
- Ireland
- Province: Munster
- County: Kerry

Demographics
- Population: 0 (2016)
- Pop. density: 0/km^{2} (0/sq mi)

Additional information
- inhabited until 1954

The Great Blasket (Irish: An Blascaod Mór) is the principal island of the Blaskets, County Kerry, Ireland. It was home to a small fishing community of Irish speakers until the island was evacuated in 1953 when living there became unsustainable.

== Geography ==
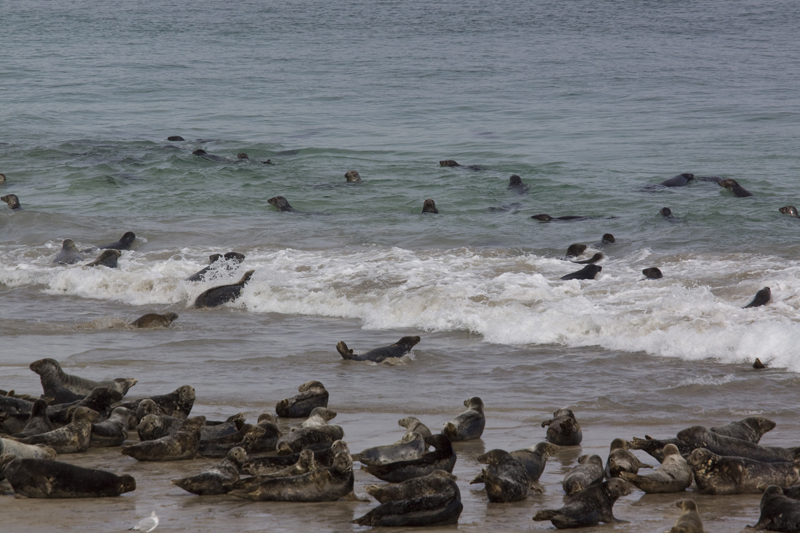
Grey seal colony on Great Blasket

The island lies approximately two kilometres from the mainland at Dunmore Head, and extends six kilometres to the southwest, rising to 346 m (1,135 ft) at its highest point (An Cró Mór). The nearest mainland town is Dunquin; a ferry to the island operates from a nearby pier during summer months.

Garraun Point at 52.1045°N 10.5074°W has been incorrectly cited as being the most westerly point of the Irish mainland, but this is Dunmore Head. At longitude 10° 39.7', Tearaght Island is the westernmost of the Blaskets, and thus the most westerly point of the republic of Ireland.

== History ==
The Great Blasket has been inhabited on and off for centuries. The earliest known reference to people living on the island was at the start of the 1700s. A Ferriter castle once stood at Rinn an Chaisleáin. In the 1840s it was estimated that a population of about 150 people were living on the island. It was the most westerly settlement in Ireland, with islanders mostly living in primitive cottages perched on the relatively sheltered north-east shore. They subsisted mainly by fishing, supplementing their diet with potato, oats, hunting rabbits and the eggs of birds who nested on the island; due to lack of wood they had to use heather, peat and turf as fuel.

Around 1909 and 1910, the Congested Districts Board built five properties to improve the housing stock on the island. A two storey guesthouse was built later.

Island life was very tough and the draw of emigration was strong, ultimately becoming the death knell for the island. During WWII shortages of sugar, soap, tea, paraffin, tobacco and flour/bread intensified this draw further.

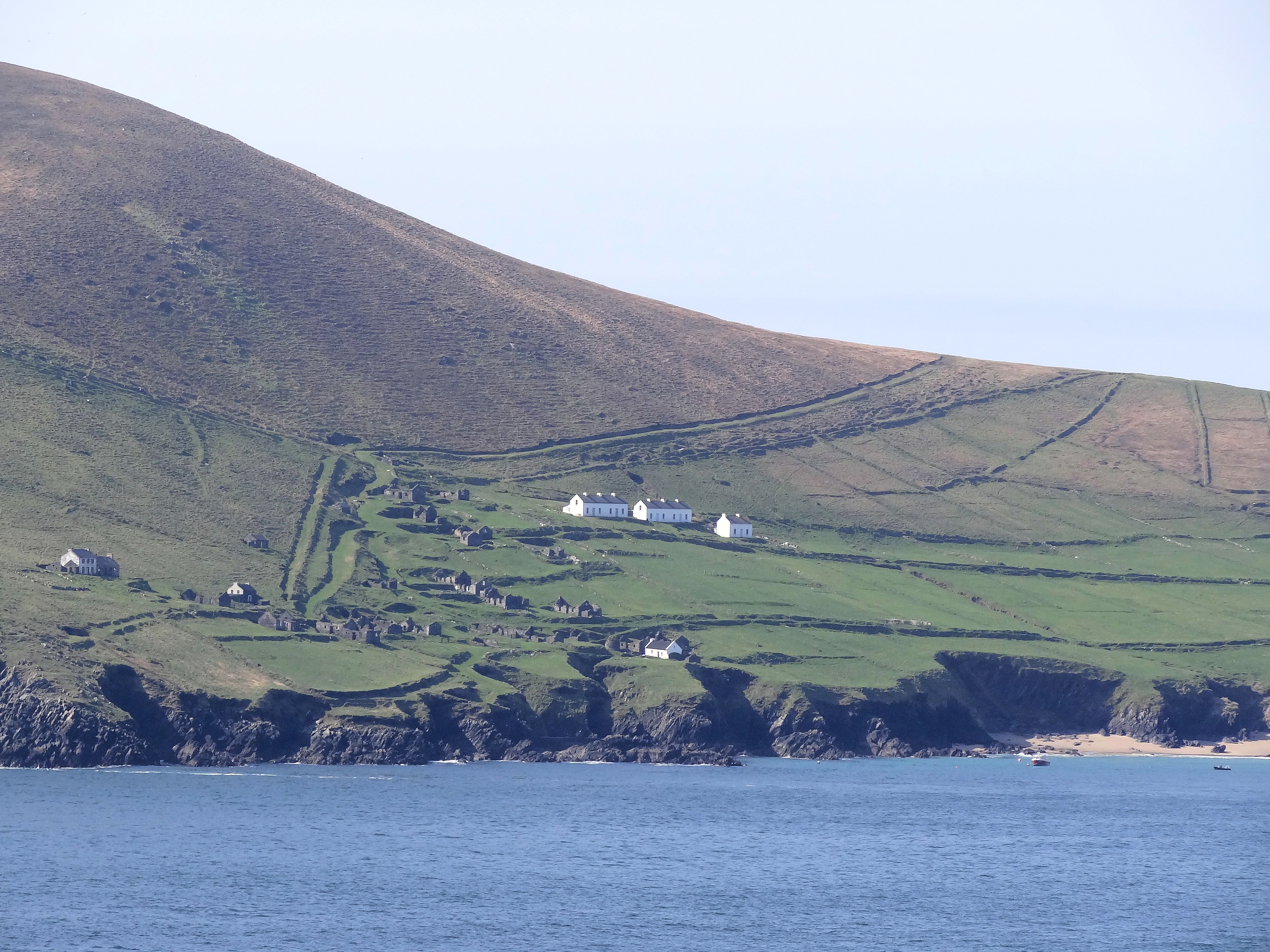
Old village on Great Blasket

The weather was a present and constant hazard. In April 1947, the island was cut off from the mainland for weeks due to bad weather. The Islanders sent a telegram to the Taoiseach, Éamon de Valera, urgently requesting supplies which duly arrived two days later by boat.

The island was inhabited until 1953 when the Irish government decided that it could no longer guarantee the safety of the remaining but rapidly declining population. Previously, the islanders had been petitioning for relocation following the death of a young resident, Seánín Ó Cearnaigh. Ó Cearnaigh had become ill and as a result of poor weather, no doctor or priest could reach the island. Continued inclement weather prevented his body being taken to the consecrated graveyard across the Blasket Sound in Dunquin for a number of days. It was this tragic event that led the islanders to realize there was no continued prospect of a viable community remaining on the island.

In 2009, the Office of Public Works bought most of the property on the island, including the deserted village, and the state is now the majority landowner. Guided tours of the island were launched in 2010 and plans are underway for the preservation and conservation of the old village. The home of Muiris Ó Súilleabháin is now in ruins but Peig Sayers' second home on the island has been restored. The home of Tomás Ó Criomhthain was also restored by the OPW in 2018 and is now free to visit by the public.

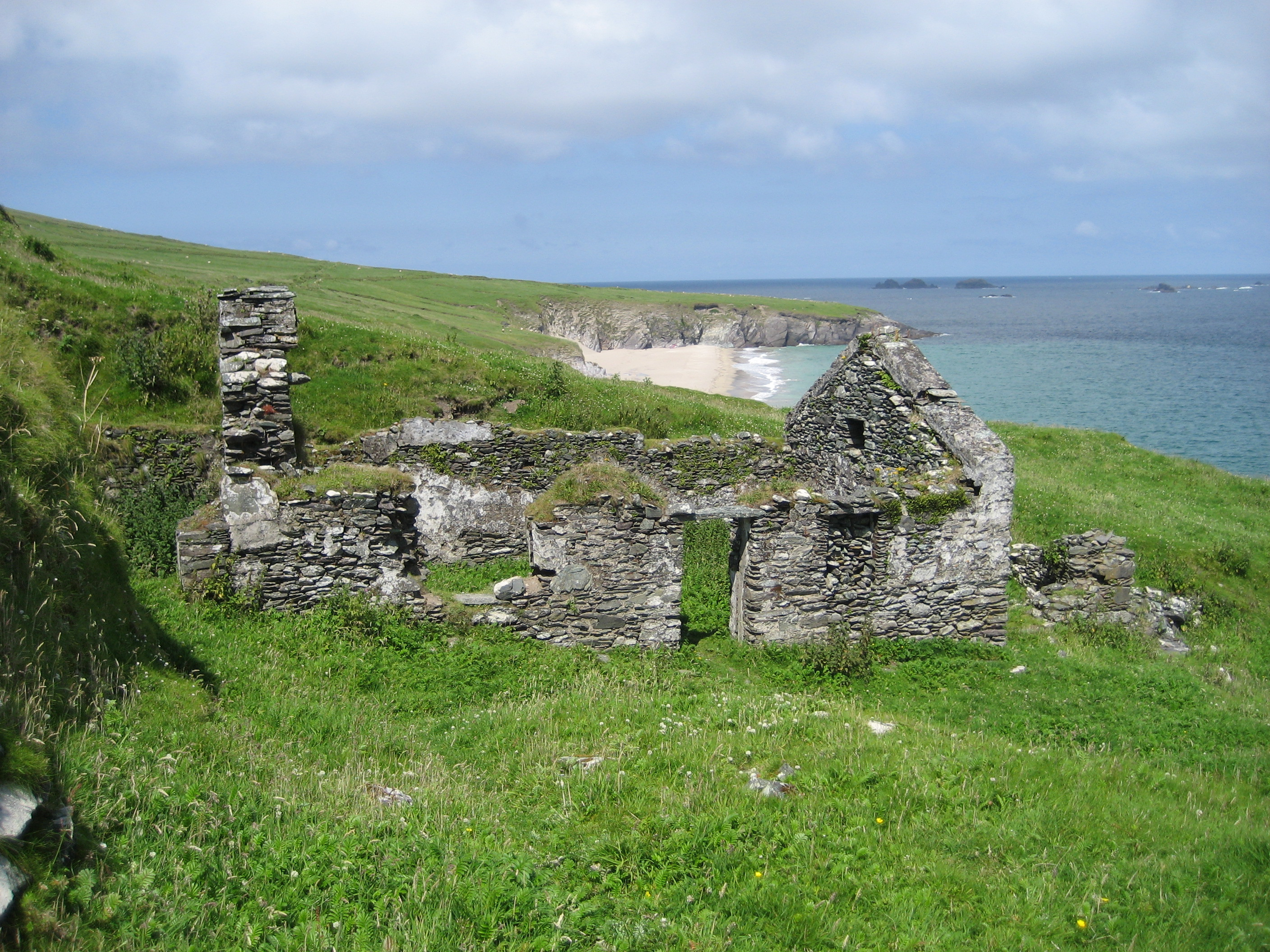
An abandoned home on the island

In 2014 a company, The Great Blasket Island Experience, began renovation of the Congested Districts Board properties on the island as rental accommodation during the summer season. The company recruits two caretakers annually to manage the accommodation and café facilities where they live without electricity, hot water and other modern conveniences, similar to conditions the islanders endured. This old world living experience has attracted significant media attention about the role with tens of thousands of applications for the position in recent years.

=== Demographics ===
The table below reports data on Great Blasket's population taken from Discover the Islands of Ireland (Alex Ritsema, Collins Press, 1999) and the Census of Ireland.

Historical population

Year	Pop.	±%
1841	153	—
1851	97	−36.6%
1861	95	−2.1%
1871	130	+36.8%
1881	136	+4.6%
1891	132	−2.9%
1901	145	+9.8%
1911	160	+10.3%
1926	143	−10.6%

Year	Pop.	±%
1936	110	−23.1%
1946	45	−59.1%
1951	27	−40.0%
1956	0	−100.0%
1961	0	0.00%
1966	0	0.00%
1971	0	0.00%
1979	0	0.00%
1981	0	0.00%

Year	Pop.	±%
1986	4	—
1991	4	+0.0%
1996	0	−100.0%
2002	0	0.00%
2006	2	—
2011	0	−100.0%
2016	0	0.00%

Source: Central Statistics Office. "CNA17: Population by Off Shore Island, Sex and Year". CSO.ie.

== Literature ==
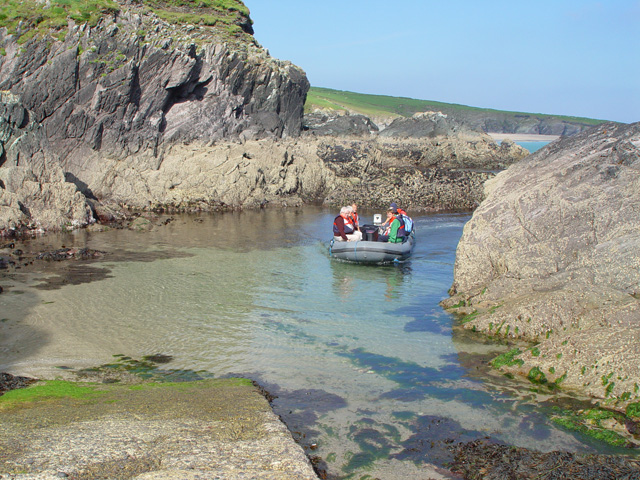
The slipway to the island

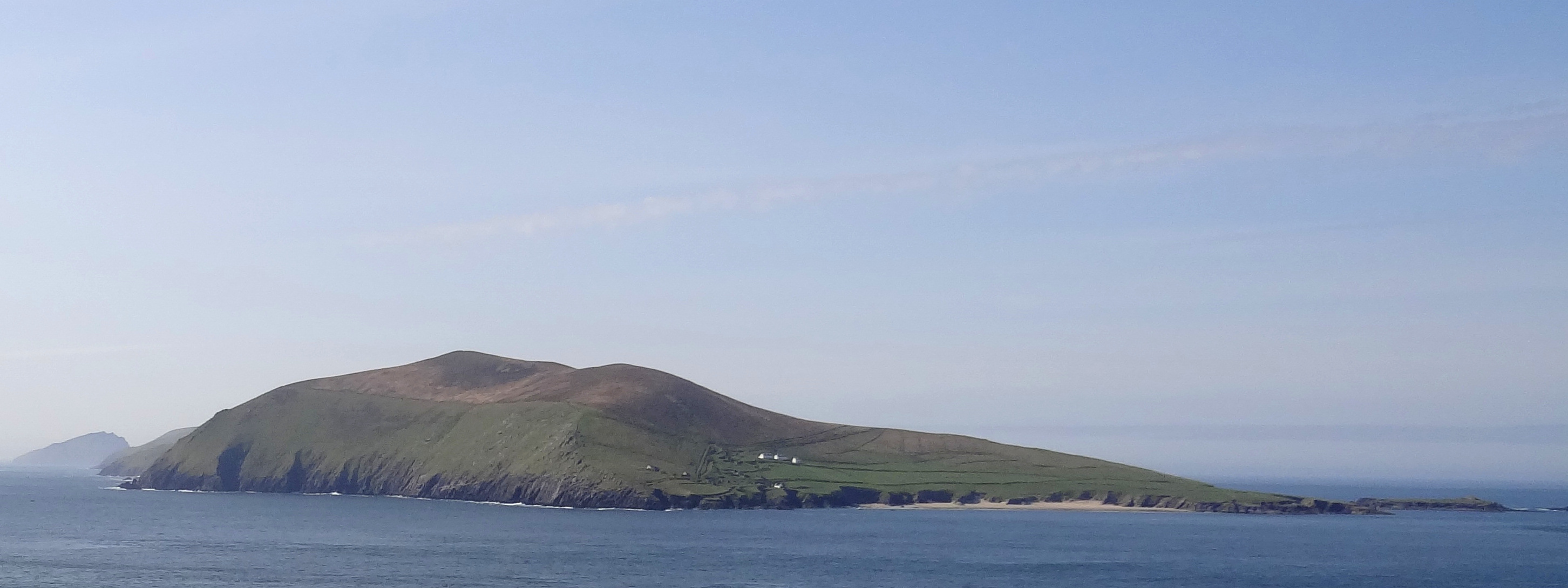
Great Blasket from Dunmore Head

Despite its small population, the island has produced a number of writers who documented the island life and have kept alive old Irish folk tales of the land. Best known are Machnamh Seanamhná (An Old Woman's Reflections, Peig Sayers, 1939), Fiche Bliain ag Fás (Twenty Years A-Growing, Muiris Ó Súilleabháin, 1933), and An tOileánach (The Islandman, Tomás Ó Criomhthain, 1929). These are considered to be invaluable records of the island and its old Irish folk tales.

== Ownership dispute ==
The hostel and café on the island were at the centre of a dispute between the Irish State, which wishes to make the island a national park, and an individual, who claims to own the greater part of the island. The differences between the State and Blascaoid Mor Teoranta (BMT, 'Great Blasket Ltd') were settled by an agreement made in August 2007; subject to the granting of planning permission, the deal meant that more than 95% of the island land, including the old village, would be sold to the State and become a de facto national park.
