= Tomás Ó Criomhthain =

Irish writer (1855–1937)

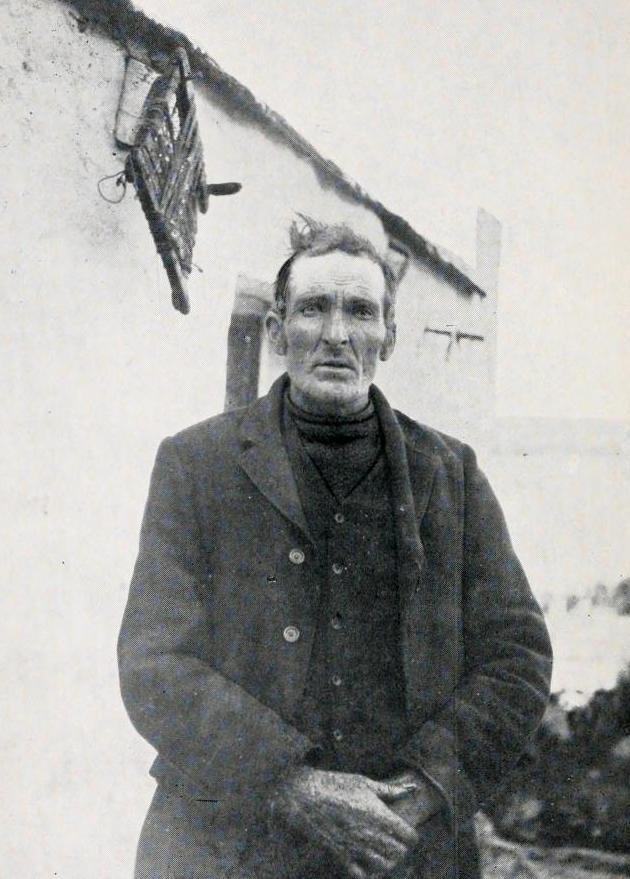
- Born: Great Blasket Island, Ireland
- Baptised: 29 April 1855
- Died: 7 March 1937 (aged 81); Great Blasket Island, Ireland
- Occupations: Fisherman; farmer
- Spouse: Máire Ní Chatháin (m. 1878)
- Children: 10
- Writing career
- Language: Munster Irish
- Notable works: Allagar na h‑Inise (1928); An tOileánach (1929)

Tomás Ó Criomhthain (pronounced [t̪ˠʊˈmˠaːsˠ oː ˈkɾʲɪhənʲ]; commonly anglicised as Tomás O'Crohan and occasionally as Thomas O'Crohan; bap. 29 April 1855 – 7 March 1937) was a native of the Irish-speaking Great Blasket Island near the coast of the Dingle Peninsula in Ireland. He wrote two Irish-language books, Allagar na h‑Inise (Island Cross-Talk), written over the period 1918–23 and published in 1928, and An tOileánach (The Islandman), completed in 1923 and published in 1929. Both have been translated into English. He is known as the "godfather" of Blasket Island writers. The 2012 translation by Garry Bannister and David Sowby is to date the only unabridged version available in English. In addition to his writings, Ó Criomhthain also provided content for Father George Clune's lexicon of the Munster Irish dialect, Réilthíní Óir.

== Biography ==
It is unclear precisely when Ó Criomhthain was born. In the first sentence of An tOileánach, he states that he was born on St. Thomas's Day in 1856. However, records indicate that he was baptised on 29 April 1855.

Ó Criomhthain was the youngest of 10 siblings, only six of whom survived to adulthood: four sisters, Maura, Kate, Eileen, and Nora; a brother, Pats; and Tomás himself. Ó Criomhthain received an intermittent education between the ages of 10 and 18 whenever a schoolteacher from the mainland spent time living on the island.

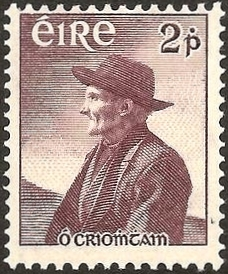
Ó Criomhthain on an Irish postage stamp from 1957.

He married Máire Ní Chatháin on 5 February 1878. Together they had ten children, but many died before reaching adulthood: one boy fell from a cliff while hunting for a fledgling gull to keep as a pet among the chickens; others died of measles and whooping cough; their son Domhnall drowned while attempting to save a woman from the sea; others died by various other means. Máire herself died while still relatively young. Their son Seán also wrote a book, Lá dar Saol ("A Day in Our Life"), describing the emigration of the remaining islanders to the mainland and America when the Great Blasket was finally abandoned in the 1940s and 1950s.

He died on 7 March 1937, at the age of 81.

== Writings ==
His books – An tOileánach in particular – are considered classics of Irish-language literature, and central texts of the corpus of the Gaelic Revival. Containing portrayals of a unique way of life, now extinct, they are of great human, literary, linguistic, and anthropological interest.

He began to write down his experiences in diary letters in the years after World War I, following persistent encouragement by Brian Ó Ceallaigh from Killarney. Ó Ceallaigh overcame Ó Criomhthain's initial reluctance by showing him works by Maxim Gorky and Pierre Loti, books describing the lives of peasants and fishermen, to prove to Ó Criomhthain the interest and value of such a project. Once persuaded, Ó Criomhthain sent Ó Ceallaigh a series of daily letters for five years – a diary – which the latter forwarded to scholar and writer Pádraig "An Seabhac" Ó Siochfhradha for editing for publication. Ó Ceallaigh then convinced Ó Criomhthain to write his life story and best-known work, An t-Oileánach. A result of Ó Criomthain's letter-writing style, the book is noted for its brevity and lack of portrayal of the author's emotions. Traditionally viewed as more a cultural ethnography than a work of literary merit, this stance has been challenged in recent times by scholars such as Mark Quigley.

The Flower translation of the text concludes with a statement whose final clause is well known and often quoted in Ireland:

I have written minutely of much that we did, for it was my wish that somewhere there should be a memorial of it all, and I have done my best to set down the character of the people about me so that some record of us might live after us, for the like of us will never be again.

— Ó Crohan, The Islandman

The first of the so-called "Blasket autobiographies", the release of An tOileánach in 1929 was followed by the release of Muiris Ó Súilleabháin's Fiche Bliain ag Fás in 1933 and Peig Sayers' Peig in 1936.

== Works ==
- Allagar na hInise, ISBN 1-85791-131-8 (in Irish)
- Allagar 11, Coiscéim 1999 Edited by Pádraig Ua Maoileoin
- An tOileánach, Cló Talbóid 2002, ISBN 0-86167-956-3 (in Irish)
- "Stair na mBlascaodaí, beag agus mór" (Manuscript images). UCD Digital Library (in Irish). University College Dublin. 2007 [1930].

Translations

- Island Cross-Talk: Pages from a Diary, translated by Tim Enright; Oxford University Press, 1987; ISBN 0-19-212252-5
- The Islandman, translated by Robin Flower; Oxford, Clarendon Press, 1951; ISBN 0-19-815202-7
- The Islander, translated by Garry Bannister and David Sowby; Gill & MacMillan, 2013; ISBN 0-71-715794-6

== See also ==
- An Béal Bocht
- Blasket Islands
- List of people on the postage stamps of Ireland
- Peig Sayers
