= Dual (album) =

Studio album by Éamon Doorley, Muireann Nic Amhlaoibh, Julie Fowlis and Ross Martin
- Released: 2008
- Recorded: Old Laundry Studios; Glenfinnan; Scotland
- Genre: Folk
- Label: Machair Records
- Producer: Doorley, Nic Amhlaoibh, Fowlis, Martin

Dual is an album by four acclaimed Irish and Scottish musicians: Éamon Doorley, Muireann Nic Amhlaoibh (both prominently of Danú), Julie Fowlis and Ross Martin.

The artists released the album in October 2008 on their official websites. The album was planned to project the similarities and differences between the Irish and Scottish Gaelic song traditions. The album features Scottish waulking songs such as Alasdair Mhic Cholla Ghasda, and an Irish equivalent to the Scottish puirt à beul. The songs are set in a traditional/folk accompaniment, very different from the recorded versions of a few of the songs by Capercaillie and Clannad.

The four musicians have been playing music together since a sing-song at the Tønder Festival in 2003. The four-piece has toured together twice a year both in Ireland and Scotland. Julie and Muireann have had very similar upbringings and found their music and languages shared many common threads. Hence the name, Dual, which means "to braid, to twine, inheritance or native" in both Irish and Scottish Gaelic. The album features songs in Irish and Scottish Gaelic, and tunes from both cultures.

== Track listing ==
1. "Dá bhfaigheann mo rogha de thriúr acu / Dhannsamaid le Ailean / Cairistion' Nigh'n Eòghainn"
2. "Beauty Deas An Oileáin"
3. "Tha 'm buntàta mòr / An Bairille / Boc liath nan gobhar"
4. "An Eala Bhàn"
5. "Uist-Kerry Set: Bu chaomh leam bhith fuireach / Port Deálaí / Neilí"
6. "Alasdair Mhic Cholla Ghasda"
7. "Gol na mBan san Ár / The Walls of Liscarroll / Alistrum's March"
8. "Duan na Muiligheartaich & Laoi na Mná Móra"
9. "An Cóisir / Chuirinn mo ghiollan a dh' iomain nan caorach"
10. "Cailíní Deasa Mhuigheo / Eader Alba is Éirinn / Mrs Ramsay of Barton / Tie the bonnet tight"
11. "Pé in Éirinn Í"
12. "A Ríogain Uasail"
