= Aeons (duo) =

Irish electronica duo

- Origin: County Kerry, Ireland
- Genres: Electronica, synth-pop, ambient
- Years active: 2016–Present
- Label: Ropeadope
- Members: Muireann Nic Amhlaoibh, Pádraig Rynne
- Website: https://www.facebook.com/AeonsIreland/

Aeons are an Irish electronica duo made up of Muireann Nic Amhlaoibh and Pádraig Rynne. They released their first singles, "Bealtaine" ('Beltane') and "An Fhuil" ('Blood') in 2016, and their first album, Fís ('Vision') in May 2018.

== NÓS Awards ==
The duo have received several nominations to, and have won twice in, the NÓS music awards, the principal awards for modern Irish-language music. In 2019, Aeons were nominated for 'Band/Musician of the Year'; Fís received a nomination for 'Album of the Year', and 'Cúramaí an tSaoil', one of the songs in Fís, was nominated for 'Song of the Year', although it was Kneecap, a rap duo from Belfast, who in the end won each of these awards. In 2017, Aeons won two NÓS awards, for 'Video of the Year', with the music video for Bealtaine, and 'Debut Act of the Year'. They also received three further nominations; Bealtaine and An Fhuil, both for 'Song of the Year', and the duo themselves for 'Band/Musician of the Year'.

These awards and nominations are summarised in the table below:

Year	Award	Song or Album	Type
2019	Musician/Band of the Year	-	Nomination
2019	Album of the Year	Fís	Nomination
2019	Song of the Year	Cúramaí an tSaoil	Nomination
2017	Musician/Band of the Year	-	Nomination
2017	Song of the Year	Bealtaine	Nomination
2017	Song of the Year	An Fhuil	Nomination
2017	Debut Act of the Year	-	Bua
2017	Video of the Year	Bealtaine	Bua

== Discography ==
Title	Year	Album
Bealtaine	2016	-
An Fhuil (with Séamus Barra Ó Súilleabháin)	2016	-
Ar Snámh	2018	Fís
Éalú	2018	Fís
A Stóirín Bán	2018	Fís
Cúramaí an tSaoil (feat. The Rubberbandits)	2018	Fís
Stoirm	2018	Fís
Fé Scáth	2018	Fís
Crann Taca	2018	Fís
Drochshúil	2018	Fís
Ar Snámh Acoustic (with Cormac McCarthy)	2018	Fís
