= Cáit Feiritéar =

Irish storyteller

- Born: 1 December 1916; Baile na hAbha
- Died: 8 June 2005 (aged 88); Dingle
- Known for: Storytelling

Cáit Feiritéar or An Bab (1 December 1916 – 8 June 2005) was an Irish storyteller.

== Biography ==
Cáit Feiritéar was born Cáit Ní Ghuithín on 1 December 1916 in Baile na hAbha, Dún Chaoin in County Kerry. The area is within the West Kerry Gaeltacht. Her mother Eibhlín Ní Shé died shortly after her birth. She was raised by her father John Ó Guithín. His father was Mícheál Ó Guithín, a storyteller, and Feiritéar learned to tell stories from him as a child. It was a family tradition, as her uncle Tadhg and her grandmother and grand-aunt, Kate Shee and Mary Ruiséal Louth, were storytellers.

Feiritéar attended Scoil Naomh Gobnait locally from 1923 to 1931.

She married James Feiritéar in 1942 and they had seven children, Brandán, Pádraig, Seán, Micheál and Séamus, Máirín and Treasa. Brandán became a radio presenter and author. Seamus became the headmaster of Colaiste Mhuire national school in Dublin (Irish-speaking), the longest-serving principle in Ireland for many years. His wife Sandra became the vice-principal.

Feiritéar told stories on Raidió na Gaeltachta and to schoolchildren attending storytelling workshops. Her storytelling was recorded by Roinn Bhéaloideas Éireann, University College Dublin and University of Limerick's Irish department as well as by Raidió na Gaeltachta. In 1988 Feiritéar came first in storytelling at the Oireachtas in Tralee. Her stories were published under the title Ó Bhéal an Bhab. She was an influence on a number of Irish writers including Seán Ó Ríordáin, Seán Ó Tuama, Máire Mhac an tSaoi and Nuala Ní Dhomhnaill.

She died on 8 June 2005 in Dingle hospital.
