= Peig Sayers =

Irish writer (1873–1958)

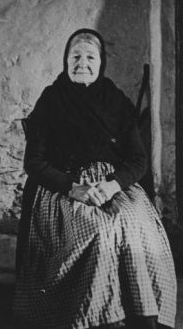
- Sayers, c. 1945
- Born: 29 March 1873; Dún Chaoin, County Kerry, Ireland
- Died: 8 December 1958 (aged 85); Dingle, County Kerry, Ireland
- Occupations: Storyteller, housewife
- Spouse: Pádraig Ó Guithín
- Writing career
- Notable work: Peig

Máiréad "Peig" Sayers (/ˌpɛɡ ˈseɪərz/; 29 March 1873 – 8 December 1958) was an Irish author and seanchaí (pronounced [ˈʃan̪ˠəxiː] or [ʃan̪ˠəˈxiː]) born in Dún Chaoin, County Kerry, Ireland. Seán Ó Súilleabháin, the former Chief archivist for the Irish Folklore Commission, described her as "one of the greatest woman storytellers of recent times".

== Biography ==
=== Youth ===
She was born Máiréad Sayers, in the townland of Baile an Bhiocáire, Dún Chaoin, Corca Dhuibhne, County Kerry, the youngest child of the family. She was called Peig after her mother, Margaret "Peig" Brosnan, from Castleisland. Her father Tomás Sayers was a locally renowned expert on the oral tradition and passed on many of his tales to Peig.

Through her father's influence, Peig also grew up upon a rich oral tradition of Irish folklore, mythology, and local history, including local folk heroes like Piaras Feiritéar, faction fights at pattern days and market fairs before the Great Famine, and the lingering memory of Mass rocks and priest hunters under the Penal Laws. The custom of bothántaíocht (people visiting neighbours at night to swap news and stories) was strong and Peig’s brother Sean used to bring her along, and Peig heard and remembered a large number of stories about the past. Peig was very sociable and enjoyed the company of older people as well as girls her own age.

At the age of 12, she was taken out of the National school and went to work as a domestic servant for the Curran family in the nearby town of Dingle. The Currans were members of the growing Irish Catholic middle class produced by the Government-funded breakup and sale of the Anglo-Irish landlords' estates after the Land War. Peig later recalled that the Curran family were kind employers and treated her very well. The Curran children, however, were forbidden by their parents, who desired for them to move up in the world, to learn the Irish language and so, at the children's request, Peig taught the local vernacular to them in secret.

After she grew to adulthood, Peig was promised during the "American wake" of her childhood best friend, Cáit Boland, that Peig would soon join her as part of the Irish diaspora in the United States. Cáit later wrote, however, that she had had an accident and could not forward the cost of Peig's passage.

=== Island Life ===
Instead, Peig moved to the Great Blasket Island after her brother arranged for her to marry Pádraig Ó Guithín, a fisherman and native of the island, nine years her senior, on 13 February 1892. Pádraig and Peig had eleven children, of whom only six survived their mother. Three died in infancy, and an eight year old girl, Siobhán, died from measles.

Norwegian linguist and Celticist Carl Marstrander stayed on the island while studying the Corca Dhuibhne dialect of Munster Irish in 1907 and later persuaded Robin Flower of the British Museum to similarly visit the Blaskets. In turn this led the great English Celticist Kenneth H. Jackson to visit during the summers of 1932-37, and Peig's storytelling influenced his ideas about oral tradition considerably. Flower and Jackson were keenly appreciative of Peig Sayers' storytelling skills. They recorded her and brought her stories to the attention of the academic world.

After the Easter Rising of 1916, Peig hung up a framed picture of the 16 executed Irish Volunteers and Irish Citizen Army leaders in the family's cottage in Great Blasket island. During a search of the island by the Black and Tans during the subsequent Irish War of Independence, a terrified Pádraig Ó Guithín ordered his wife to take the picture down before she got them all killed. Even though Peig indignantly refused, the search party did not harm anyone in their family.

Pádraig Ó Guithín died in April 1923. The remaining children, like many islanders, emigrated to America. Last to leave was Mícheál, called 'an File’ (The Poet), who sailed in 1929. From then on Peig lived only with her elderly, partially blind brother-in-law, Mícheál.

During the 1930s a Dublin teacher, Máire Ní Chinnéide, who was also a regular visitor to the Blaskets, urged Peig to tell her life story to her son Mícheál. Peig was illiterate in the Irish language, having received her early schooling only through the medium of English. She dictated her biography to Mícheál, who then sent the manuscript pages to Máire Ní Chinnéide in Dublin. Ní Chinnéide then edited the manuscript for its publication in 1936.

Over several years from 1938 Peig dictated 350 ancient legends, ghost stories, folktales, and religious stories to Seosamh Ó Dálaigh of the Irish Folklore Commission (while another source tallies 432 items collected by Ó Dálaigh from her, some 5,000 pages of material). Peig had a vast repertoire of tales, ranging from the Fenian Cycle of Irish mythology to romantic and supernatural stories.

Final Years

She continued to live on the island until 1942, when she returned to her native place, Dunquin, to live with her son, Mícheál, because there was nobody to look after her in her old age on the island.

Peig lost her eyesight in the late 1940s. She travelled to Dublin for the first time in 1952 at the age of 81 years, having required hospital treatment there.

She later moved to a hospital in Dingle, County Kerry where she died on 8 December 1958 at the age of 85 years. She is buried in the Dún Chaoin Burial Ground, Corca Dhuibhne, Ireland. All her surviving children except Mícheál emigrated to the United States to live with their descendants in Springfield, Massachusetts.

== Books ==
Sayers is most famous for her autobiography Peig and for the folklore and stories which were recorded in Machnamh Seanmhná (An Old Woman's Reflections. The books were not written down by Peig, who was illiterate, but were dictated to others.

Sayers' memoir Peig describes her childhood immersed in traditional Munster Irish-speaking culture, which was still surviving despite rackrenting Anglo-Irish landlords, the resulting extreme poverty, and the coercive Anglicisation of the educational system. Another theme was devout Catholicism and mass emigration to the New World following a ceremonial ceilidh called an "American wake".

Even though Peig Sayers' memoir at first received high praise, Máire Ní Chinnéide has since received very harsh criticism and accusations of censorship. Máire Ní Chinnéide did so, however, to make Peig's life story conform to the idealised vision of the Irish peasantry favoured by the ruling Fianna Fáil political party, which owed more to 19th century Romantic nationalism than to the reality of daily life or the culture of the Gaeltachtaí.

One matter of speculation is whether there was delicate material that a female informant such as she would have refrained from recounting to a male collector (Irish Folklore Commission's policy being to hire only male collectors), though there was evidently close rapport established between the two individuals, which perhaps overrode such hypothetical barriers. She was also among the informants not comfortable with being recorded mechanically on the Ediphone, so the material had to be taken down on pen and paper.

In the 1966 University of Chicago volume Folktales of Ireland, three uncensored folktales collected from Peig Sayers, as translated by Seán Ó Súilleabháin, appeared in English for the first time.

=== Peig ===
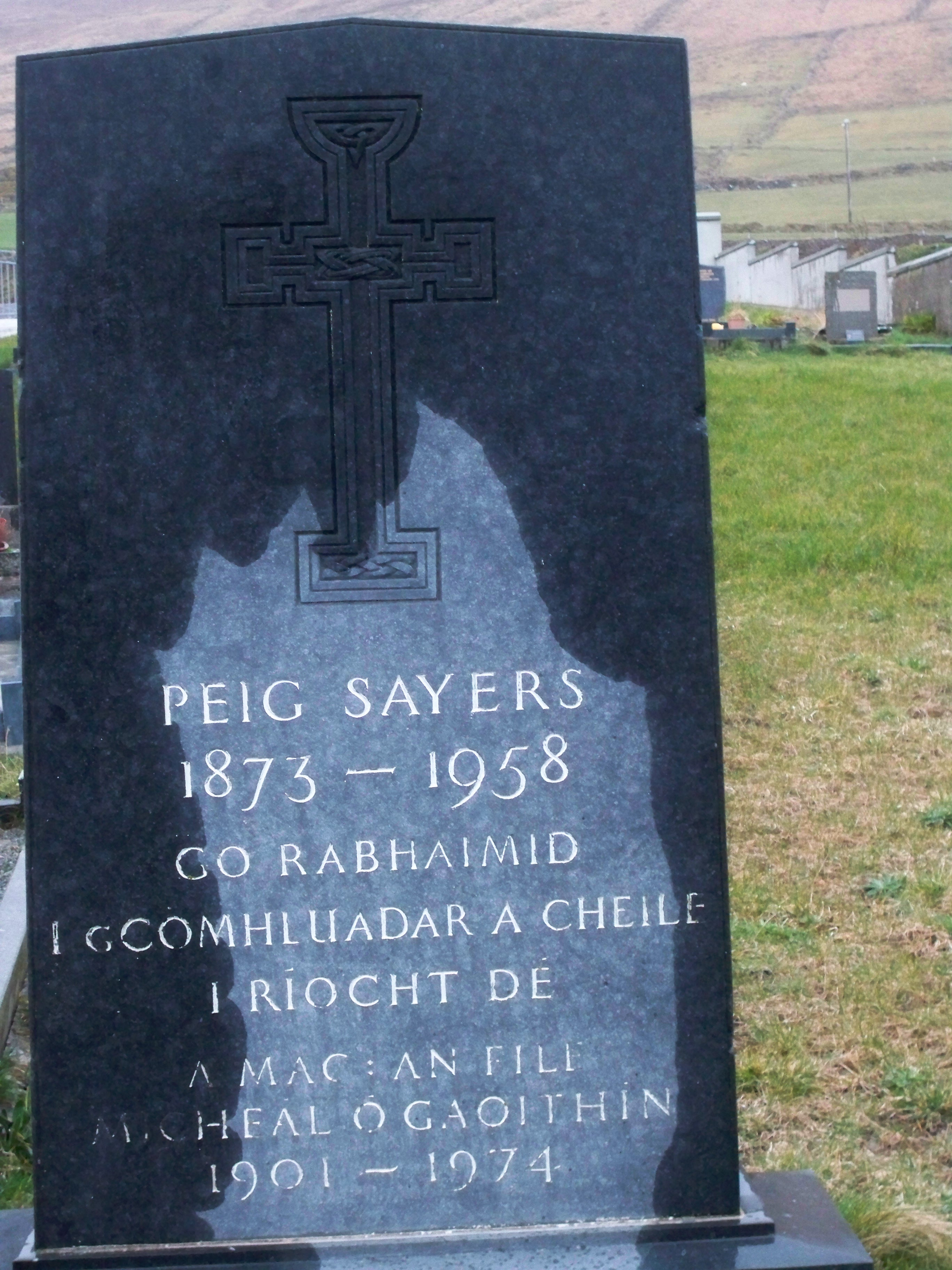
Headstone of Peig Sayers

Peig is among the most famous expressions of a late Gaelic Revival genre of personal histories by and about inhabitants of the Blasket Islands and other remote Gaeltacht locations. Tomás Ó Criomhthain's similarly censored memoir an tOileánach ("the Islandman", 1929) and Muiris Ó Súilleabháin's Fiche Bliain ag Fás, and Robert J. Flaherty's documentary film Man of Aran address similar subjects.

The often bleak tone of the book is established from its opening words:

"I am an old woman now, with one foot in the grave and the other on its edge. I have experienced much ease and much hardship from the day I was born until this very day. Had I known in advance half, or even one-third, of what the future had in store for me, my heart wouldn't have been as gay or as courageous as it was in the beginning of my days."

Ironically, the standard cliches of Peig's memoirs and those censored similarly to hers swiftly found themselves the object of contempt and mockery – especially among the cosmopolitan middle class intelligentsia and the often covertly literary Irish Civil Service – for their often extremely depressing accounts of rural poverty, starvation, family tragedies, and bereavements. In Modern literature in Irish, mockery of the Gaeltacht memoir genre reached its peak with Flann O'Brien's parody of An tOileánach: the novel An Béal Bocht ("The Poor Mouth").

Despite this fact, Peig's book was widely used as a text for teaching and examining Irish in many secondary schools. As a book with arguably sombre and depressing themes and its latter half cataloguing a string of heartbreaking family tragedies, its presence on the Irish syllabus has often been harshly criticised.

It led, for example, to the following comment from Progressive Democrat Seanadóir John Minihan in the Seanad Éireann in 2006 when discussing improvements to the curriculum:

"No matter what our personal view of the book might be, there is a sense that one has only to mention the name Peig Sayers to a certain age group and one will see a dramatic rolling of the eyes, or worse."

— Seanad Éireann – Volume 183 – 5 April 2006

According to Blasket Islands literary scholar Cole Moreton, however, this was not Peig's fault, but that of her censors: "Some of her stories were very funny, some savage, some wise, some earthy; but very few made it into the pages of her autobiography. The words were dictated to her son, then edited by the wife of a Dublin school inspector, and both collaborators sanitized the text a little in turn so that it was homely and pious, a book fit to be taken up as a set text in Irish schools. The image of Peig's broad face smiling out from beneath a headscarf, hands clasped in her lap, became familiar to generations of schoolchildren who were bored rigid by this holy peasant woman who had been forced upon them. They grew up loathing Peig... without hearing the stories as they were intended."

Peig was eventually replaced by Maidhc Dainín Ó Sé's A Thig Ná Tit Orm during the mid-1990s.

== Popular culture ==
Brown Bag Films made a Peig animated series for RTÉ in 1994.

The stage play, Peig: The Musical! (co-written by Julian Gough, Gary MacSweeney and the Flying Pig Comedy Troupe) is a humorous adaptation of Peig's autobiography which culminates in her moving to New York and becoming a star on Broadway. It ran at the Town Hall Theatre, Galway for four sold out performances in 1996. Gough described it as "an act of the most exquisite revenge...and of great therapeutic value to a generation traumatised by her infernal book as children".

In Paddywhackery, a television show from 2007 on the Irish language on television channel TG4, Fionnula Flanagan plays the ghost of Peig Sayers, sent to Dublin to restore faith in the Irish language revival.

In 2021, TG4 broadcast a series presented by Sinéad Ní Uallacháin which attempted to change people's perceptions of Sayers.
