= Muireann Nic Amhlaoibh =

Irish musician & singer (born 1978)

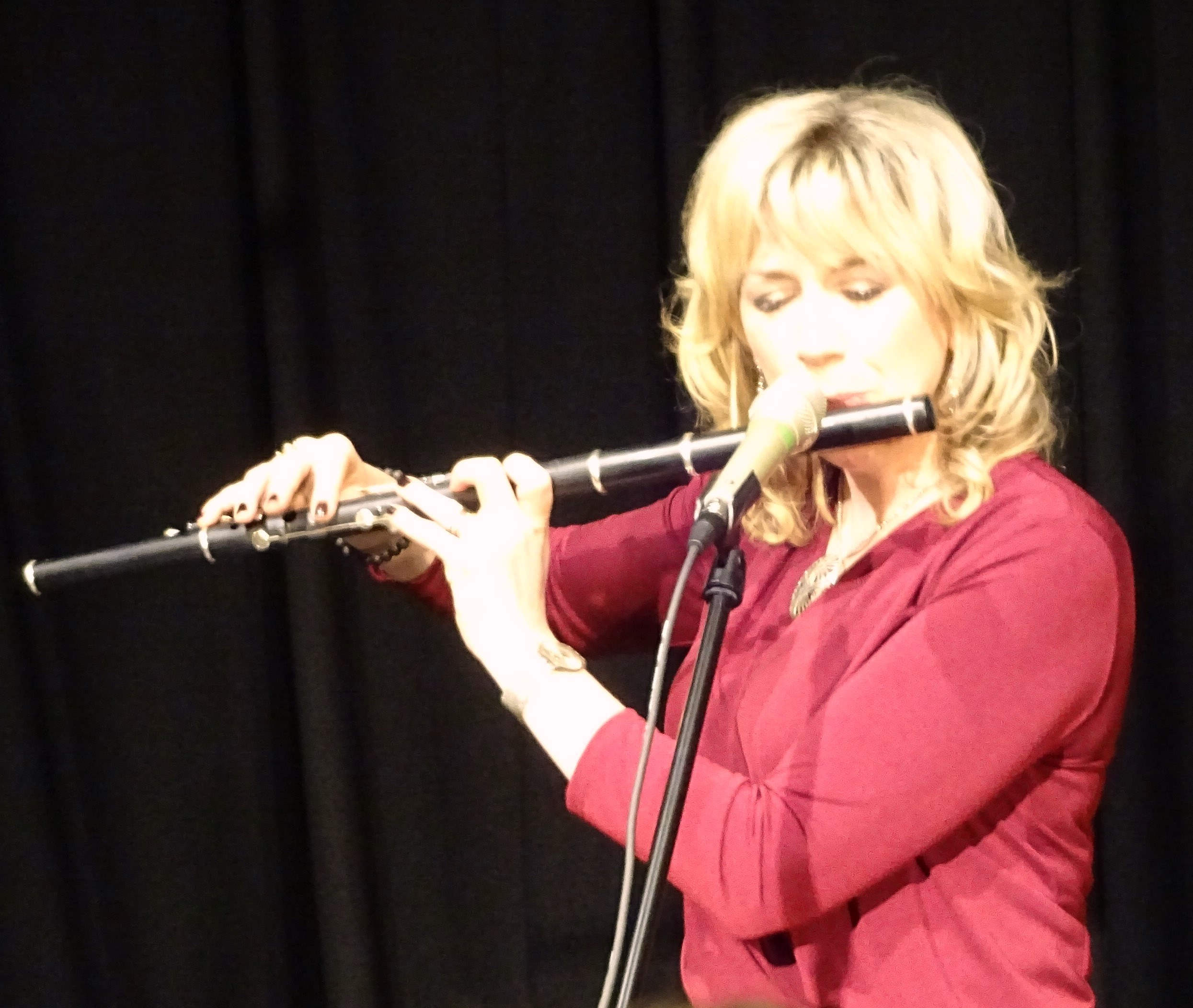
- Nic Amhlaoibh performing in 2017

Background information
- Born: 1978 (age 47–48); Inis Oírr, Aran Islands, Ireland
- Genres: Celtic; Folk; Electronica
- Occupations: Singer; Flautist; Pianist
- Years active: 2002–present
- Label: Machair Records
- Website: Official site Official Myspace site

Muireann Nic Amhlaoibh (born 1978) is a musician and singer from County Kerry, Ireland. Until 2016, she was the lead singer for the traditional music group Danú, and from that year on she has been half of the electronica duo Aeons.

== Biography ==
Muireann Nic Amhlaoibh grew up in Dún Chaoin in County Kerry, as well as on Inis Oírr, the smallest of the Aran Islands, and Cape Clear Island, another small island off the coast of County Cork. These communities are in Gaeltacht (Irish-speaking) areas and Nic Amhlaoibh's first language is Irish. This influenced her later career, due to her early exposure to Irish language song, especially in the sean-nós tradition. She began playing piano and fiddle at an early age before progressing to the whistle and, eventually, the flute. Nic Amhlaoibh's early musical experiences also included accompanying her father, traditional Irish fiddle player Feargal Mac Amhlaoibh, to sessions.

When Nic Amhlaoibh moved to the West Kerry Gaeltacht, she joined the national folk theatre of Ireland, Siamsa Tíre. During the six years she spent with them, she participated in several of their major performances. While in Kerry, her singing developed, learning and gaining influence from local singers such as the Begley family, Áine Ní Laoithe, and Eilín Ní Chearna. She spent four years in Dublin attending the Dún Laoghaire Institute of Art, Design and Technology, earning a diploma in fine art. She then studied at the University of Limerick and was awarded a Master of Arts in Traditional Music Performance.

== Recording ==
Nic Amhlaoibh's first recordings were on a CD of Irish traditional music and song performed by Geantraí, a group of musicians who performed a show of the same name in the Skellig hotel in Dingle. She also recorded several CDs, including The Crooked Road by William Coulter, Cello by Barry Phillips, and several compilation CDs. As part of the requirements for her Master of Arts in Traditional Music Performance, Nic Amhlaoibh produced a solo album of tunes and songs entitled Réalt na Maidine/Morning Star. A limited edition of this album was distributed, mainly locally in Dingle, although copies were also sold in the United States and Europe.

Nic Amhlaoibh joined the traditional Irish group Danú in 2003. Ciarán Ó Gealbháin, Danú's former lead singer, left the band in 2003, and Nic Amhlaoibh took over as singer and whistle player, occasionally joining band member Tom Doorley in playing the flute. She recorded her first album with Danú in 2003, called The Road Less Travelled. Danú recorded an album of solos in 2004 entitled Up in the Air, and Nic Amhlaoibh played and sang on three tracks. In 2005, the band released the album When All is Said and Done.

Nic Amhlaoibh participated in the project Hands Across the Water, a collaboration album with participation from dozens of high-profile traditional and folk musicians and singers. The proceeds of album sales going to victims of the tsunami in southeast Asia.

Nic Amhlaoibh released her first major solo CD in 2006, entitled Daybreak/Fáinne an Lae. It featured musicians such as Oisín Mc Auley and Éamonn Doorley from Danú, Gerry O Beirne, and John Doyle from Solas.

In 2008, Nic Amhlaoibh recorded Dual in Irish and Scottish Gaelic with Julie Fowlis, Éamonn Doorley (of Danú), and Ross Martin to highlight the many similarities and differences between Irish and Scottish Gaelic cultures. Dual was released in October 2008.

In 2016, Nic Amhlaoibh recorded the single Bealtaine as one-half of the electronica duo Aeons, together with Pádraig Rynne. Later that year, they proceeded to release a second single, An Fhuil, followed by a full album, Fís, in 2018.

== Television and radio ==
Nic Amhlaoibh's television appearances include The Highland Sessions, a BBC Four television series featuring Irish and Scottish Gaelic music. Other television work includes The Late Late Show, Amuigh Faoin Spéir (Irish: "Out Under the Sky") (produced by Éamon de Buitléar), The History of Irish Dance, Léargas, Moving West, Fleadh Cheoil and An Ghaeilge Bheo. BBC Alba appearances include performing and co-presenting (with Julie Fowlis) Cuirm@Celtic and Dà-Fhillte.

Radio work includes Rattlebag and The Late Session with Áine Hensey on RTÉ and An Saol ó Dheas on RTÉ Raidió na Gaeltachta. She also hosted a music programme “Folk on One” on RTÉ Radio 1.

== Discography ==
=== Albums ===
- Morning Star/Réalt na Maidine (2002)
- Daybreak/Fáinne an Lae (2006)
- Dual (2008 – with Julie Fowlis)
- Ar Uair Bhig an Lae/The Small Hours (2013)
- Foxglove & Fuchsia (2017)
- Thar Toinn/Seaborne (2020)
- Neadú (2021)
- Róisín ReImagined (2022)

=== With Danú ===
- The Road Less Travelled (2003)
- Up in the Air (2004)
- When All Is Said and Done (2005)
- One Night Stand (Danú DVD) (2005)
- Seanchas (2010)
- Buan (2015)

=== With Aeons ===
- Fís (2018)
