= Danú =

Irish band

- Origin: Waterford, Ireland
- Genres: Traditional, folk
- Years active: 1995-present
- Members: Benny McCarthy; Nell Ní Chróinín; Oisín McAuley; Éamon Doorley; Tony Byrne; Ivan Goff
- Past members: Tom Doorley; Daire Bracken; Dónal Clancy; Muireann Nic Amhlaoibh; Ciarán Ó Gealbháin; Cárthach Mac Craith; Noel Ryan; Jesse Smith
- Website: http://www.danu.net

Danú is an Irish traditional music band.

The founding members of Danú (Donnchadh Gough, Dónal Clancy, Daire Bracken, and Benny McCarthy) met in Waterford in Ireland in 1994, and consolidated as a band after performing in the Festival Interceltique de Lorient in 1995.

Their second album, Think Before You Think (2000) was voted Best Overall Traditional Act by Dublin's magazine Irish Music. They are the only band to have been voted Best Traditional Group twice in the BBC Radio 2 Folk Awards, in 2001 and again in 2004 when their version of Tommy Sands's "County Down" also won Best Original Song.

== Members ==
Benny McCarthy is a founding member of Danú; he manages and performs with the band and plays button accordion and melodeon. Benny won the All Ireland Oireachtas in 1994 on both button accordion and melodeon. He is the driving force of Danú and is a key member of several other bands including Raw Bar Collective and Cordeen.

Oisín McAuley, a previous member of Stockton's Wing, plays four- and five-string fiddle with Danú. He has recently released a solo album of fiddle music. Jesse Smith and Daire Bracken previously played fiddle for Danú.

Tom Doorley was the flute-player with Danú from 1996 until he retired from large-scale touring in 2007, and often acts as the spokesman for the band on stage. He teaches and lives in Dublin and makes an appearance now and again with Danú at concerts in Ireland and Europe. Ivan Goff, who had been a guest on several tours before Tom Doorley's retirement, became the full-time flute player for the band following his retirement. An accomplished Uileann piper, flute and whistle player from Dublin, Goff is based in Brooklyn, New York.

Éamon Doorley plays bouzouki and fiddle, and is the younger brother of Tom Doorley. His bouzouki playing has a strong emphasis on countermelody. He currently collaborates with his wife Julie Fowlis, playing mainly Scottish Gaelic music and song. The Doorley brothers joined Danú in 1996.

Donnchadh Gough, another founding member of the band, plays both bodhran and uilleann pipes. He guests on Bodhran with Danú in Ireland and Europe. Amy Richter has performed on Bodhran with Danú during US tours since Dec 2017.

Until 2016, the band's lead singer was Muireann Nic Amhlaoibh, who replaced earlier singer Ciarán Ó Gealbháin, a tenor who left to finish his education in May 2003, and who had in turn replaced founding member Cárthach Mac Craith in August 1999. Nic Amhlaoibh sang in English and Irish, in the folk and sean-nós traditions, and also played flute and whistle. In January, 2016, it was announced that she would be leaving the band to be replaced by Sean Nós singer Nell Ní Chróinín.

Dónal Clancy a founding member of Danú was the guitar player for the band in 1995 and returned to the band in 2002 until he retired from Danú in March 2017. During his absence, he was replaced by guitar player from Newport, County Tipperary Noel Ryan. Clancy was replaced by Tony Byrne, who had done tours with the band since 2005.

== Discography ==
- Danú (1997)
- Think Before You Think (2000)
- All Things Considered (2002)
- The Road Less Travelled (2003)
- Up In The Air (2004)
- When All Is Said and Done (2005)
- One Night Stand (DVD) (2005)
- Seanchas (2010)
- Buan (2015)
- Ten Thousand Miles (2018)
- The Pearl Album: Live in Celebration (2025) [2 CD set - compilation, recorded live at various venues]

=== Side projects ===
- Dual (2008) - Éamon and Muireann with Julie Fowlis and Ross Martin
- Raw Bar Collective (2011)-Benny McCarthy
- Cordeen (2017)-Benny McCarthy
