= Muiris Ó Súilleabháin =

Irish author (1904–1950)

- Born: 19 February 1904; Great Blasket Island
- Died: 25 June 1950 (aged 46); Connemara Coast, Ireland
- Occupations: Author and Garda Síochána
- Writing career
- Language: Irish language
- Genre: Memoir
- Notable works: Fiche Bliain ag Fás (English: Twenty Years a-Growing)

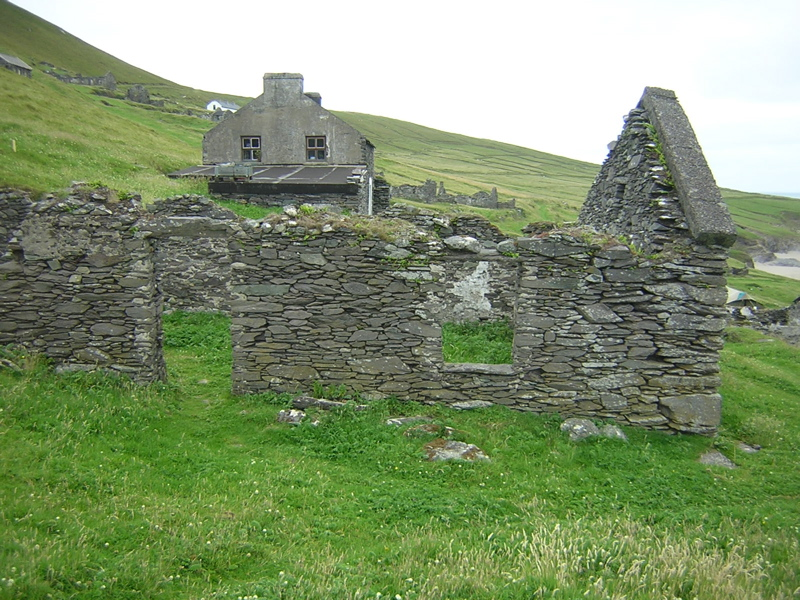
The ruins of the house in which Muiris Ó Súilleabháin grew up on the Great Blasket Island.

Muiris Ó Súilleabháin (Irish: [ˈmˠɪɾʲɪʃ oː sˠuːl̠ʲəˈwaːnʲ]; 19 February 1904 – 25 June 1950), anglicised as Maurice O'Sullivan, was an Irish author famous for his Irish language memoir of growing up on the Great Blasket Island and in Dingle, County Kerry, off the western coast of Ireland. It is his unique published work.

== Writings ==
Fiche Blian ag Fás (Twenty Years a-Growing) was published in Irish and English in 1933. As one of the last areas of Ireland in which the Irish language and culture had continued unchanged, the Great Blasket Island was a place of enormous interest to those seeking traditional Irish narratives. Ó Súilleabháin was persuaded to write his memoirs by George Thomson, a linguist and professor of Greek who had come to the island to hear and learn the Irish language. It was Thomson who encouraged him to join the Gardaí (police) rather than emigrate to America as most of the young people of the island did. Thomson edited and assembled the memoir, and arranged for its translation into English with the help of Moya Llewelyn Davies.

While Fiche Blian ag Fás was received with tremendous enthusiasm by critics, including E.M. Forster, their praise at times had a condescending tone. Forster described the book as a document of a surviving "Neolithic" culture. Such interest was tied up with romantic notions of the Irish primitive, and thus when Ó Súilleabháin tried to find a publisher for his second book, Fiche Bliain faoi Bhláth (English: Twenty Years a-Flowering), there was little interest, as this narrative necessarily departed from the romantic realm of turf fires and pipe-smoking wise-women.

Dylan Thomas commenced, but did not finish, a filmscript of Twenty Years a-Growing.

== Personal life ==
Following the death of his mother when he was six months old, Ó Súilleabháin was raised in an institution in Dingle, County Kerry. Aged eight, he returned to Great Blasket Island to live with his father, grandfather and the rest of his siblings, from whom he acquired an understanding of the Irish language. He joined the Garda Síochána in Dublin in 1927 and was stationed in the Gaeltacht area of Connemara, where he kept up contact with Thomson. In 1934, he left the Guards and settled in Connemara. Ó Súilleabháin drowned on 25 June 1950, while swimming at Knocknacarra off the Connemara coast.

== Unique published work and its translations ==
- Fiche Bliain ag Fás (in Irish) (First ed.). Baile Átha Cliath (Dublin): Clólucht an Talbóidigh. 1933. p. 381.

- Twenty Years a-Growing [Fiche Bliain ag Fás]. Trans. (from Irish to English) Moya Llewelyn Davies & George Thomson. (First ed.). New York City: Viking Books. 1933. p. 303.
- Vingt ans de jeunesse [Fiche Bliain ag Fás] (in French). Trans. (from English to French) Raymond Queneau. Paris, France: Gallimard. 1934.

- Dvacet let se roste [Fiche Bliain ag Fás] (in Czech). Trans. (from English to Czech) Vladimír Vendyš. Prague: Rudolf Škeřík. 1934. p. 341.

- Dwadzieścia lat dorastania [Fiche Bliain ag Fás] (in Polish). Trans. (from English to Polish). Warsaw, Poland: People's Publishing Cooperative. 1986. p. 296.

- Das Meer ist voll der schönsten Dinge: Eine irische Lebensgeschichte [Fiche Bliain ag Fás] (in German). Trans. (from English to German) Elisabeth Aman and Karl Klaus Rabe. Göttingen, Germany: Lamuv Verlag GmbH. 2000.
