= Smerwick Group =

Geologic formation on the Dingle Peninsula, Ireland

- Stratigraphic range: Emsian
- Type: Group
- Unit of: Old Red Sandstone
- Sub-units: Sauce Creek, Ballydavid and Farran Sandstone formations
- Underlies: Pointagare Group (unconformity)
- Overlies: Dingle Group (unconformity)

Lithology
- Primary: Sandstone
- Other: conglomerate

Location
- Region: Munster
- Country: Ireland
- Extent: Southwest Ireland

Type section
- Named for: Smerwick

The Smerwick Group is a Devonian lithostratigraphic group (a sequence of rock strata) in the Dingle peninsula, County Kerry, Ireland. The name is derived from the village of Smerwick (Irish: Ard na Caithne) where the strata are exposed in coastal sections on either side of Smerwick Harbour, a deep bay on the peninsula's northwest coast.

== Lithology and stratigraphy ==
The Group comprises the Sauce Creek, Ballydavid and Farran Sandstone formations of Devonian age including strata of fluvial and aeolian origin and conglomerates.
