= St. Manchan's Oratory =

- An Teampall Geal, Templemanagan
- Teampall Mhanachain
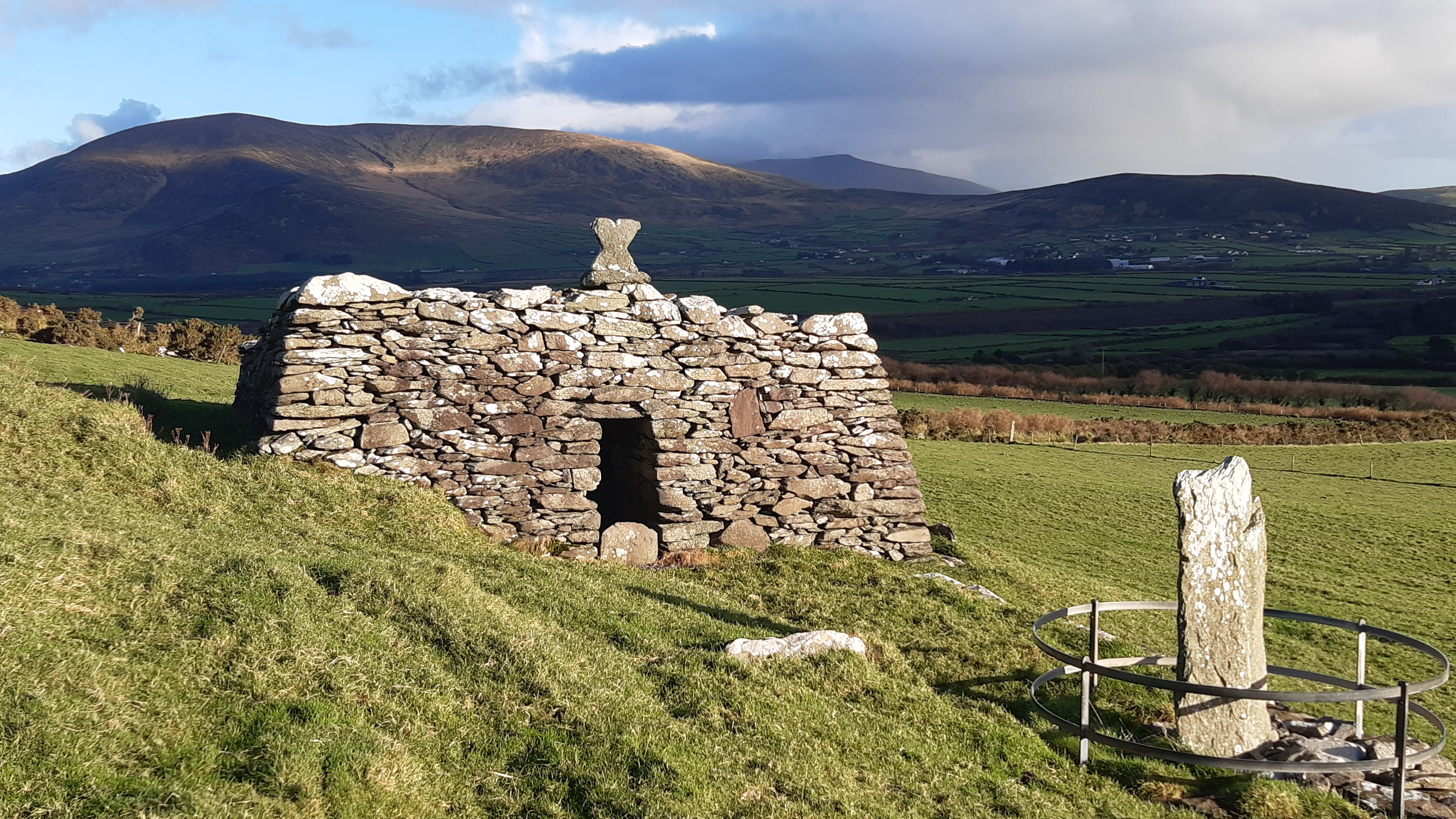
- The oratory and ogham stone

- Location within Ireland
- 52.154529°N 10.331290°W
- Location: Ballymorereagh, Dingle, County Kerry
- Country: Ireland
- Denomination: Catholic (pre-Reformation)

History
- Dedication: Manchan

Architecture
- Functional status: ruined
- Style: Celtic Christian
- Years built: c. 7th–9th century AD

Specifications
- Length: 5.5 m (18 ft)
- Width: 5 m (16 ft)
- Height: 2.75 m (9 ft 0 in)
- Materials: dry stone

Administration
- Diocese: Ardfert and Aghadoe

National monument of Ireland
- Official name: Teampull Geal (Ballymorereagh)
- Reference no.: 62

St. Manchan's Oratory, also called An Teampall Geal ("the bright church") is a medieval oratory and National Monument in County Kerry, Ireland.

== Location ==
St. Manchan's Oratory is located in Ballymorereagh (An Baile Riabhach), on the southeast slopes of Lateeve (Leataoibh) hill, 4.5 km (2.8 mi) west-northwest of Dingle.

== Description ==
=== Church ===
A boat-shaped oratory similar to that at Gallarus. It stands 2.75 m (9 ft 0 in) high and has a finial. A souterrain (called Poll na Sagart, the priest's hole, based on the common legends that Catholic priests hid in them in the Penal era) and ancient burial ground with cross-inscribed slabs lie nearby. A holy well, Tobermanaghan, lies to the south.

=== Ogham stone ===
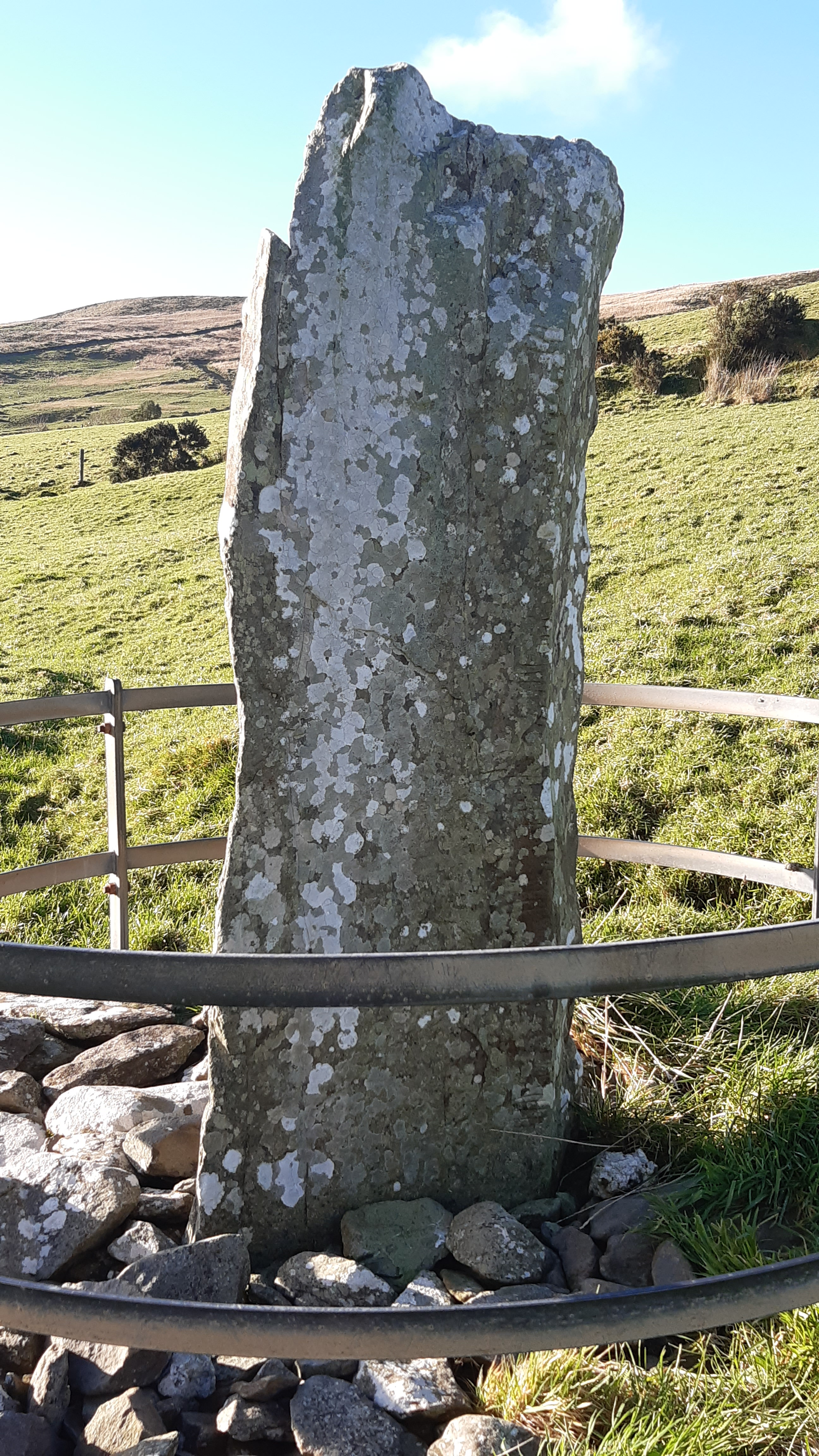
The ogham stone in December 2025

The ogham stone (CIIC 170) stands 1.68 m (5 ft 6 in) and reads QENỊLOCI MAQI MAQI-AINIA MUC̣[OI] ("of Cellach, son of the son of Ania, of the tribe of ..."). Sabine Ziegler placed it in the 5th–7th centuries AD.
