= An Triúr Deirféar =

Three peaks on Dingle Peninsula, Ireland

Coordinates: 52.20°N 10.42°W

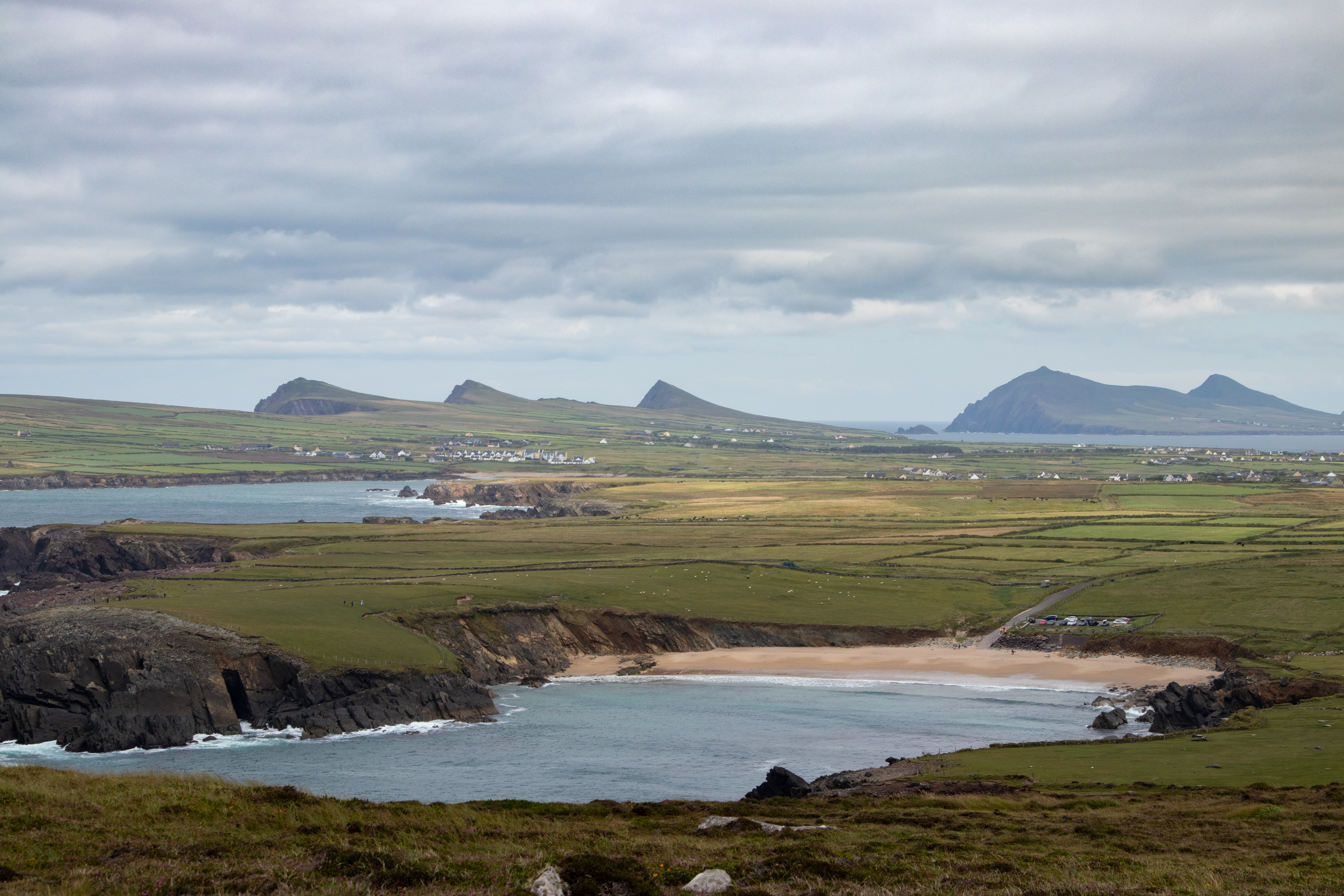
The three sisters (left) with mountain Ceann Bhaile Dháith (right)

An Triúr Deirféar (The Three Sisters in Irish) are a group of three peaks at the northwestern end of the Dingle Peninsula in County Kerry, Ireland.

== Geography ==
The hills are situated just to the north of the village of Baile an Fheirtéaraigh. Binn Diarmada elevation is 153 m.

== Etymology ==
The names of the little peaks are from the westerly most hill, Binn Hanrai, Binn Meanach and Binn Diarmada. Though they are called "the three sisters", none of them has a female name associated with it.

== Gallery ==
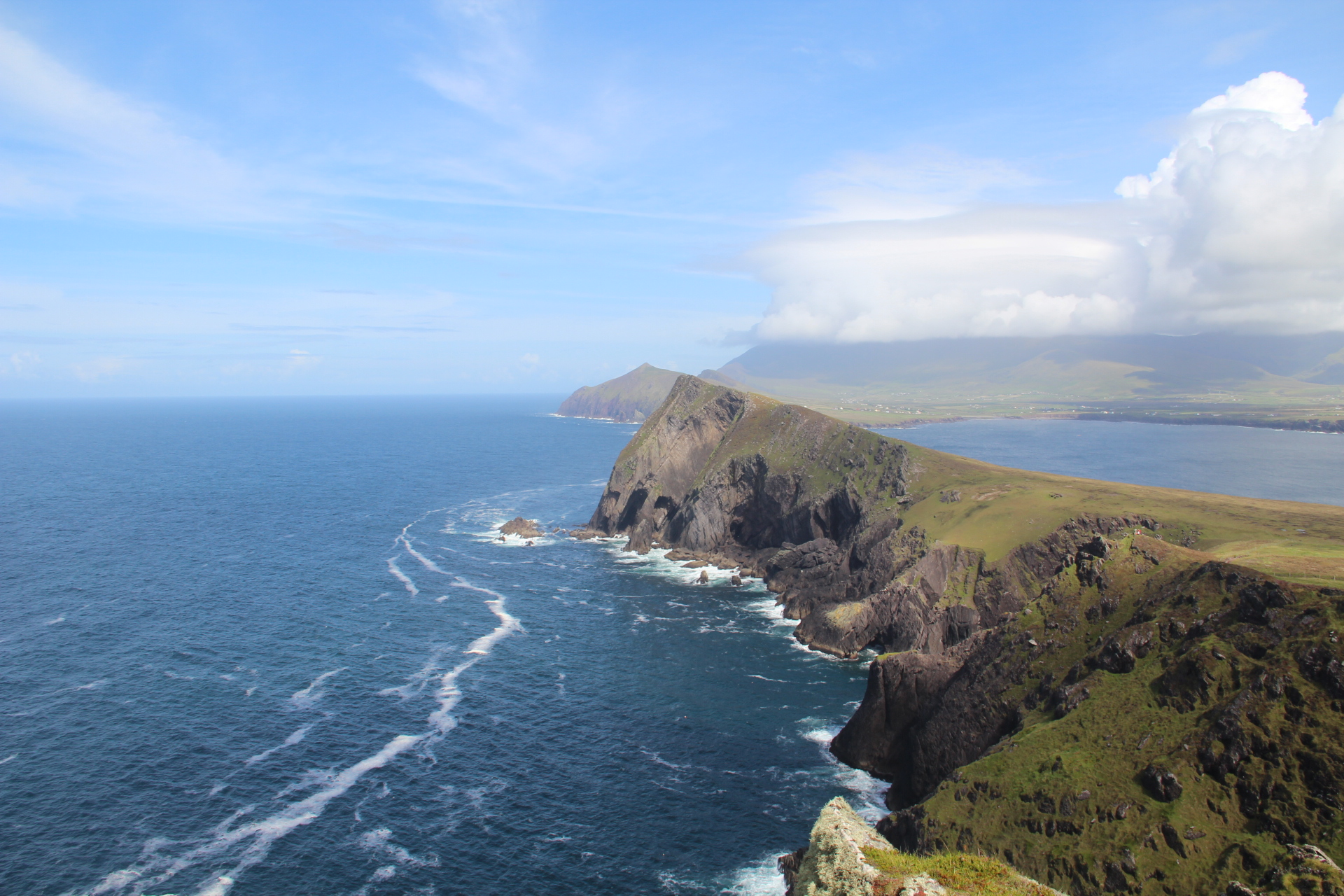
Seaside view

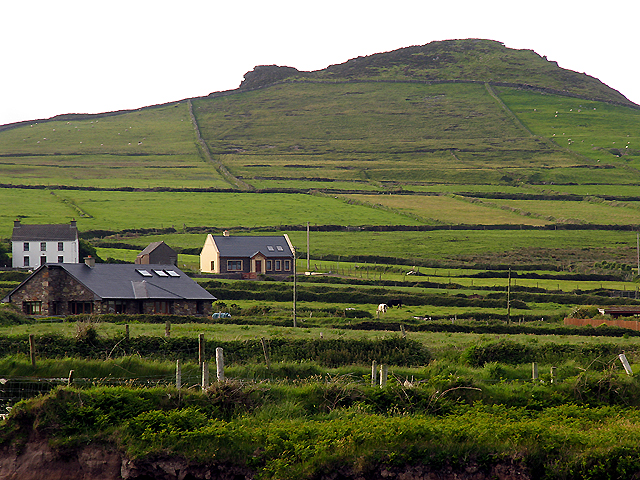
An Bhinn Mheanach

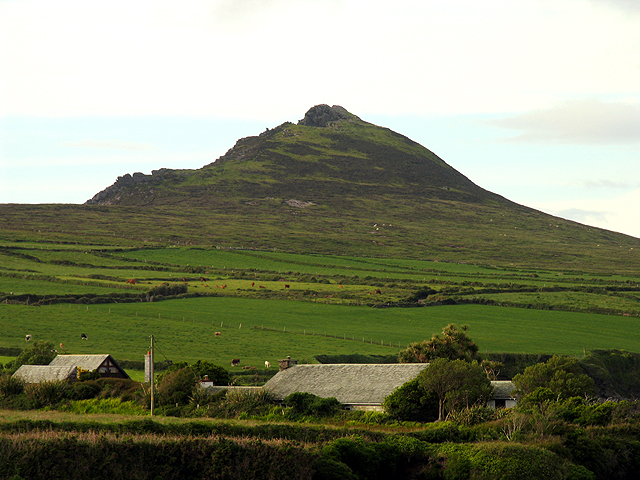
Binn Diarmada

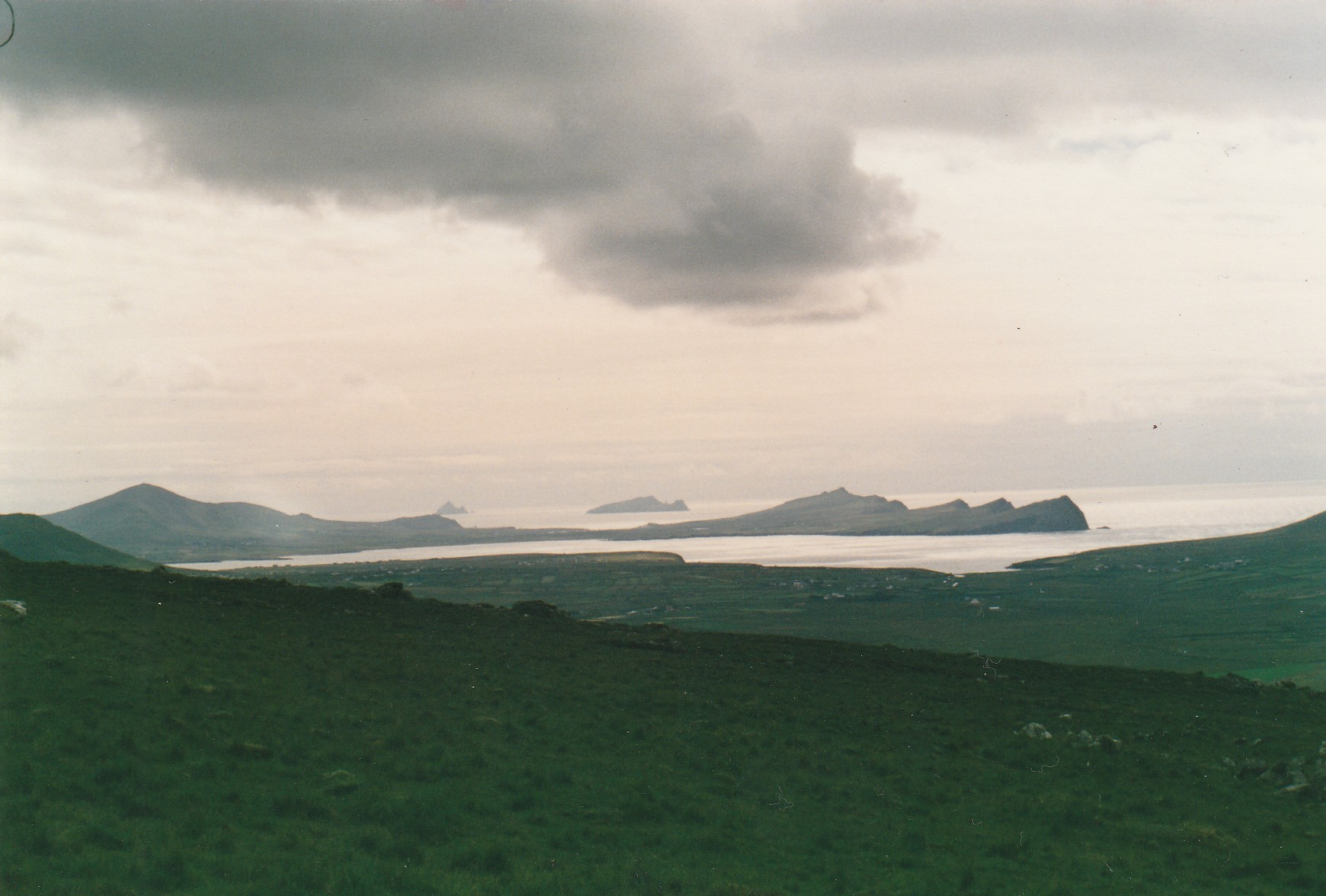
The headland as seen from Mount Brandon (Inishtearaght and Inishtooskert are visible further out to sea)
