= Dingle Group =

Sequence of rock strata

- Stratigraphic range: Pragian to Emsian
- Type: Group
- Unit of: Old Red Sandstone
- Sub-units: Glashabeg Conglomerate, Ballyferriter, Ballymore Sandstone, Slea Head, Coumeenoole Sandstone, Eask Sandstone, Bull's Head and Trabeg Conglomerate formations
- Overlies: Dunquin Group (unconformity)

Lithology
- Primary: Sandstone
- Other: Siltstone, conglomerate, mudstone

Location
- Region: Munster
- Country: Ireland
- Extent: Southwest Ireland

Type section
- Named for: Dingle

The Dingle Group is a Devonian lithostratigraphic group (a sequence of rock strata) in the Dingle peninsula, Munster, Ireland. The name is derived from the town of Dingle and the peninsula to which it gives its name where the strata are exposed on mountainsides and in coastal cliffs.

== Lithology and stratigraphy ==
The Group comprises several different sandstone formations of Devonian age including cross-bedded and pebbly sandstones, conglomerates, siltstones and mudstones.
