= Dunquin Group =

Silurian lithostratigraphic group in Ireland

- Stratigraphic range: Llandovery-Wenlock
- Type: Group
- Sub-units: Croaghmarin, Drom point, Mill Cove, Clogher Head, Ferriter's Cove, Foilnamahagh & Coosglass Slate Formations
- Underlies: Dingle Group (unconformity)

Lithology
- Primary: Siltstone
- Other: Pyroclastics, lava, ignimbrite, slate

Location
- Region: Munster
- Country: Ireland
- Extent: Southwest Ireland

Type section
- Named for: Dunquin

The Dunquin Group is a Silurian lithostratigraphic group (a sequence of rock strata) in the Dingle peninsula, Munster, Ireland. The name is derived from the village of Dunquin (Irish: Dun Chaoin) where the strata are exposed within an inlier on hillsides and in coastal sections at the extreme western end of the peninsula.

== Lithology and stratigraphy ==
The Group comprises siltstones, slates and a variety of extrusive igneous rocks from the Croaghmarin, Drom Point, Mill Cove, Clogher Head, Ferriter's Cove, Foilnamahagh and Coosglass Slate formations of Silurian age. The siltstones are frequently fossiliferous.
