= Murphy's Ice Cream =

Irish ice cream company

- Industry: Retail and wholesale
- Founded: 2000; 26 years ago in Dingle, Ireland
- Headquarters: Dingle, Ireland
- Key people: Seán Murphy and Kieran Murphy
- Operating income: €496,627 (2024)
- Website: murphysicecream.ie

Murphy's Ice Cream is a food company based in Dingle, County Kerry, Ireland. It uses the milk of Kerry cattle and serves coffees as well as ice creams and desserts. Seán and Kieran Murphy started Murphys Ice Cream in Dingle in 2000 with the goal of making the "best ice cream in the world". They make a range of usual and unusual flavours, including brown bread and sea salt.

== Expansions ==
In 2003, Murphy's Ice Cream expanded into a new production facility and began supplying local restaurants and shops. In 2005, Murphy's Ice Cream opened a second shop on Main Street in Killarney. In 2006, Murphy's Ice Cream began using milk from local cattle in Kerry. It expanded into the Chinese market in 2024, expanding to three outlets in Dalian in 2025. In Ireland, it now has shops in Dingle, Dublin, Killarney, Dublin and Cork, and its products are sold in supermarkets nationwide.
