= Dingle =

Town in County Kerry, Ireland

Dingle Daingean Uí Chúis (Irish)
- Town
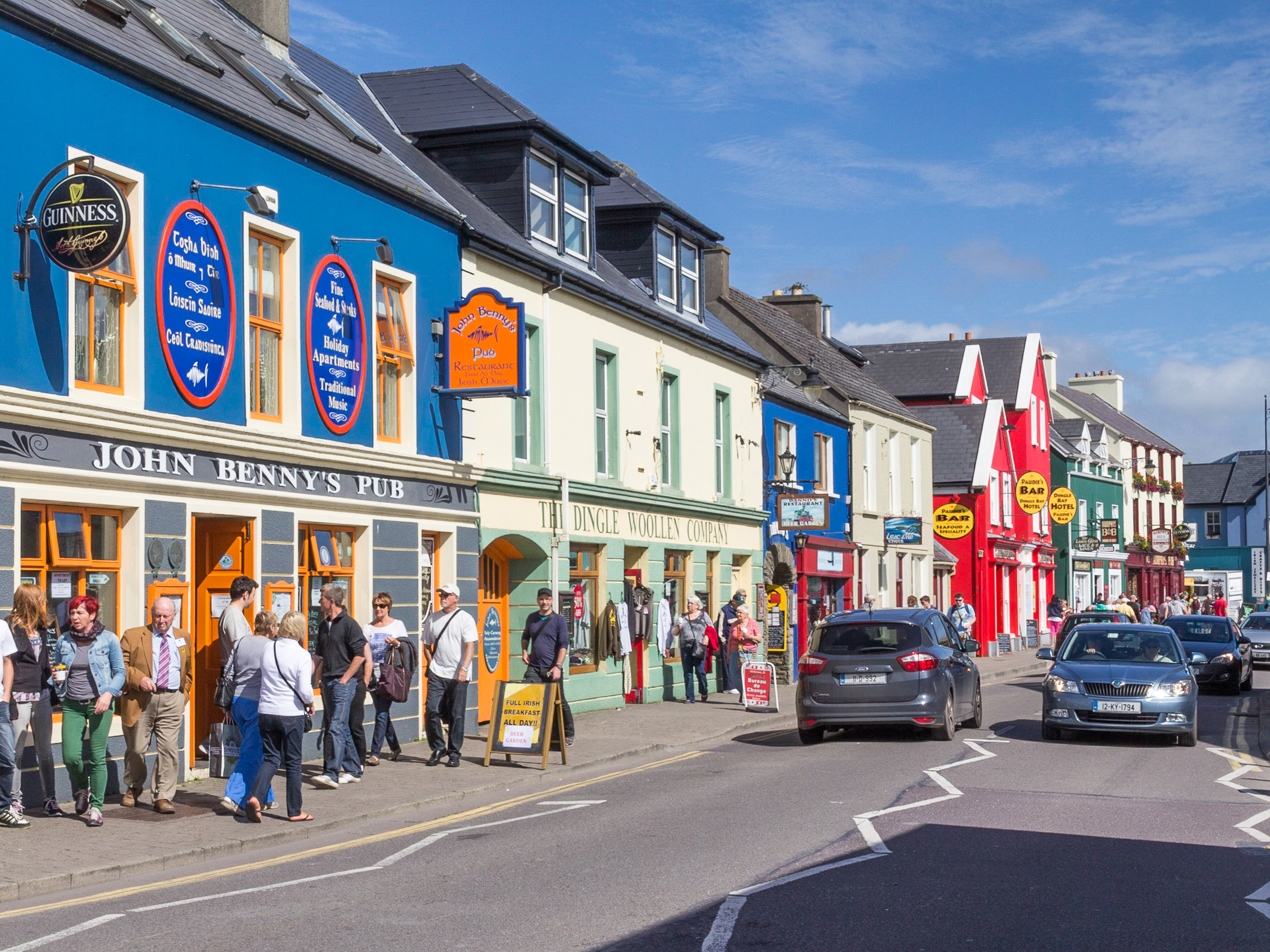
- Strand Street, Dingle

- Location in Ireland
- Coordinates: 52.13991°N 10.2715°W
- Country: Ireland
- Province: Munster
- County: County Kerry
- Barony: Corkaguiny

Population (2022)
  - Total: 1,671
- Irish Grid Reference: Q445011

Historical population
Year	Pop.	±%
1821	4,538	—
1831	4,327	−4.6%
1841	3,386	−21.7%
1851	3,273	−3.3%
1861	2,260	−31.0%
1871	2,117	−6.3%
1881	1,833	−13.4%
1891	1,764	−3.8%
1901	1,786	+1.2%
1911	1,884	+5.5%
1926	1,998	+6.1%
1936	1,800	−9.9%
1946	1,683	−6.5%
1951	1,545	−8.2%
1956	1,453	−6.0%
1961	1,460	+0.5%
1966	1,406	−3.7%
1971	1,401	−0.4%
1981	1,358	−3.1%
1986	1,253	−7.7%
1991	1,272	+1.5%
1996	1,536	+20.8%
2002	1,828	+19.0%
2006	1,920	+5.0%
2011	1,965	+2.3%
2016	2,050	+4.3%
2022	1,671	−18.5%

Dingle (Irish: An Daingean or Daingean Uí Chúis, meaning "fort of Ó Cúis") is a town in County Kerry in the south-west of Ireland. The only town on the Dingle Peninsula (known in Irish as Corca Dhuibhne), it sits on the Atlantic coast, about 50 kilometres (30 mi) southwest of Tralee and 71 kilometres (40 mi) northwest of Killarney. Principal industries in the town are tourism, fishing and agriculture; Dingle Mart, its livestock market, serves the surrounding countryside. An adult Bottlenose dolphin named Fungie had been courting human contact in Dingle Bay since 1983 but disappeared in 2020.

In 2022, Dingle had a population of 1,671, a decrease from the 2016 census, and the oldest average age for a town in Ireland (44.4 years). Situated in a Gaeltacht region, 13.7% of the population spoke Irish on a daily basis in 2016. The town in the barony of Corkaguiny (the name 'Corkaguiny' being the anglicised version of Corca Dhuibhne).

== Naming ==
In 2005, Éamon Ó Cuív, the Minister for Community, Rural and Gaeltacht Affairs, announced that anglicised place names (such as 'Dingle') of Gaeltacht towns and villages would no longer feature on official signposts within the Republic of Ireland; henceforth, only the Irish language names would appear. The English language version of the town's name was thus officially dropped in early 2005, with the largely colloquial Irish name An Daingean being advanced. In the case of Dingle, the move was particularly controversial, as the town relies heavily on the tourist industry, and there was fear that the change could prevent visitors from finding the town. Detractors noted that tourists might not recognise the Irish name on signposts and that there could also be confusion with a similarly named Daingean in County Offaly. Supporters rejected this argument, pointing out that there are numerous towns in Ireland with similar names. The minister suggested that a name change to English could be brought about by removing the town's Gaeltacht status, which would remove its entitlement to government grants for Irish-speaking areas.

In late 2005, Kerry County Council approved the holding of a plebiscite for the change of name to the bilingual "Dingle/Daingean Uí Chúis" which took place in October 2006. The result was announced on 20 October, and 1,005 of the 1,086 returned ballots (electorate: 1,222) favoured the change to the bilingual version. Éamon Ó Cuív stated, however, that there was no remit to act on the results of the plebiscite. Nevertheless, in 2008, John Gormley, the Minister for the Environment, Heritage and Local Government, announced his intention to amend the local government laws to allow names chosen by plebiscite to supersede any Placenames Order under the Official Languages Act 2003. This would mean that Daingean Uí Chúis would be the official name of the town in Irish, with "Dingle" the official name in English. However, the name of the town on road signs within the Gaeltacht will continue to display the name of the town in Irish only. In the meantime, some locals took matters into their own hands by spray painting "Dingle" on road signs that bore only the Irish version of the name.

Section 191 of the Local Government Act 2001, as substituted by section 48 of the Environment (Miscellaneous Provisions) Act 2011, specifically made "Dingle" the English name and Daingean Uí Chúis the Irish name.

== History ==
A large number of Ogham stones were set up in an enclosure in the 4th and 5th centuries AD at Ballintaggart.

The town developed as a port following the Norman invasion of Ireland. By the thirteenth century, more goods were being exported through Dingle than Limerick, and in 1257 an ordinance of Henry III imposed customs on the port's exports. By the fourteenth century, importing wine was a major business. The 1st Earl of Desmond, who held palatine powers in the area, imposed a tax on this activity around 1329. By the sixteenth century, Dingle was one of Ireland's main trading ports, exporting fish and hides and importing wines from the continent of Europe. French and Spanish fishing fleets used the town as a base.

Connections with Spain were particularly strong and, in 1529, the 11th Earl of Desmond and the ambassador of Emperor Charles V signed the Treaty of Dingle. Dingle was also a major embarkation port for pilgrims to travel to the shrine of Saint James at Santiago de Compostela. The parish church was rebuilt in the sixteenth century under "Spanish patronage" and dedicated to the saint.

In 1569 the commerce of the town was increased when it was listed as one of fifteen towns or cities which were to have a monopoly on the import of wine.

=== Second Desmond Rebellion ===
The Dingle Peninsula was the scene of much of the military activity of 1579–80. On 17 July 1579, James FitzMaurice FitzGerald brought a small fleet of ships to Dingle. He made landfall, launching the Second Desmond Rebellion, but was to die soon after in a minor skirmish with the forces of a cousin. The fleet left the town after three days, later anchoring at Dún an Óir on the outskirts of Smerwick at the western end of the peninsula, leading eventually to the Siege of Smerwick in November 1580.

=== Walled town and chartered borough ===
The residents of Dingle applied in 1569 for a "murage grant" to construct walls around the town. The grant was not forthcoming on that occasion. Following the defeat of the Desmond Rebellion, Elizabeth I directed that a royal charter be granted to incorporate the town as a borough, and to allow for the construction of walls. Traces of these town walls can still be seen, while the street layout preserves the pattern of burgage plots.

Although Elizabeth intended to grant a charter, the document was not obtained until 2 March 1607, when her successor, James I, sealed the charter, although the borough and its corporation had already been in existence for twenty-two years. The head of the corporation was known as the sovereign, fulfilling the role of a mayor. In addition to the sovereign, who was elected annually on the Feast of St Michael, the corporation consisted of twelve burgesses. The area of jurisdiction of the corporation was all land and sea within two Irish miles of the parish church. The borough also had admiralty jurisdiction over Dingle, Ventry, Smerwick and Ferriter's Creek "as far as an arrow would fly".

The charter also made Dingle a parliamentary borough, with the constituency Dingle electing two members to the Irish House of Commons. It was disfranchised in 1801 on the coming into effect of the Acts of Union 1800.

=== 18th century and the linen industry ===
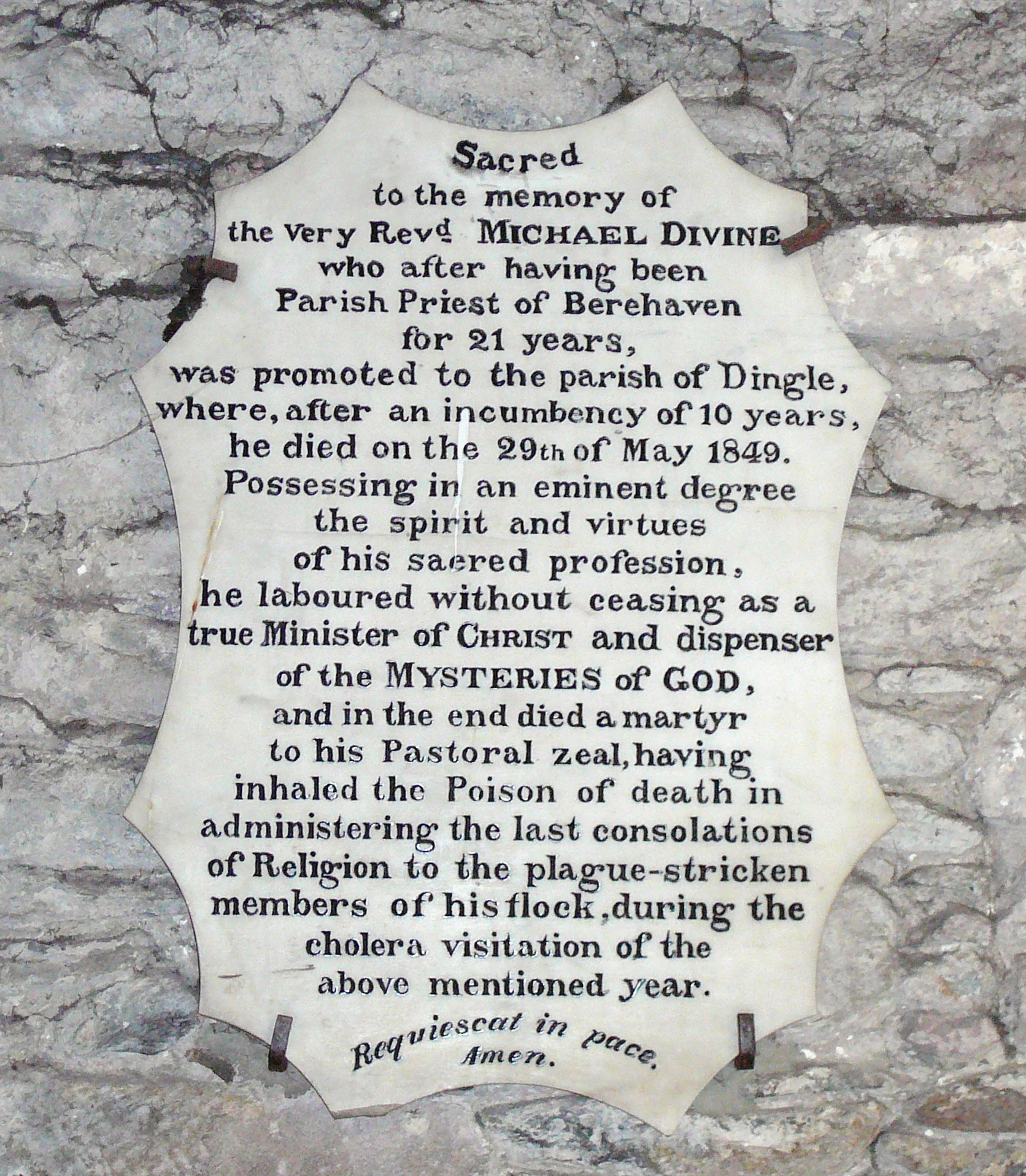
Commemorative plaque to Fr. Michael Divine, a parish priest who ministered to cholera victims and himself succumbed to the plague

Dingle suffered greatly in the Nine Years' War and the Wars of the Three Kingdoms, being burnt or sacked on a number of occasions. The town started to recover in the eighteenth century, due to the efforts of the Fitzgerald family, Knights of Kerry, who established themselves at "The Grove" at this time. Robert Fitzgerald imported flax seed and by 1755 a flourishing linen industry had been established, with cloth worth £60,000 produced annually. The trade collapsed following the industrial production of cotton in Great Britain, and was virtually extinct by 1837. The town fell victim to a cholera plague in 1849.

=== 19th century and fishing ===
Dingle is a major fishing port, and the industry dates back to about 1830. The 1870s saw major development, when "nobby" fleets from the Isle of Man came in search of mackerel. Lowestoft herring trawlers subsequently joined the fleet, allowing for a longer fishing season. The pier and maritime facilities were developed by the Congested Districts Board, and the arrival of rail transport in 1891 allowed for the transport of fish throughout the country, and a canning and curing industry developed.

== Education ==
There are three primary schools in Dingle: Scoil An Ghleanna, Scoil Iognáid Rís and Bunscoil an Clochair. There are also two secondary schools – Pobalscoil Chorca Dhuibhne and Coláiste Íde Boarding School. Dingle, as part of the Corca Dhuibhne Gaeltacht, also hosts an Irish school for students during the summer.

The Sacred Heart University, Connecticut, USA, has an Irish studies centre in Dingle.

== Places of interest ==
Dingle's St. Mary's is a neo-Gothic church built to designs by J. J. McCarthy and O'Connell. The foundation stone was laid in 1862. It originally had a nave and aisles separated by arcades, supported on columns capped by octagonal tops. The arcades were demolished in one of the most radical reordering schemes executed in Ireland. The project also saw the demolition of the exterior walls to below the original clerestory level, and, most notably, of the attic and upper ranges of the west elevation.

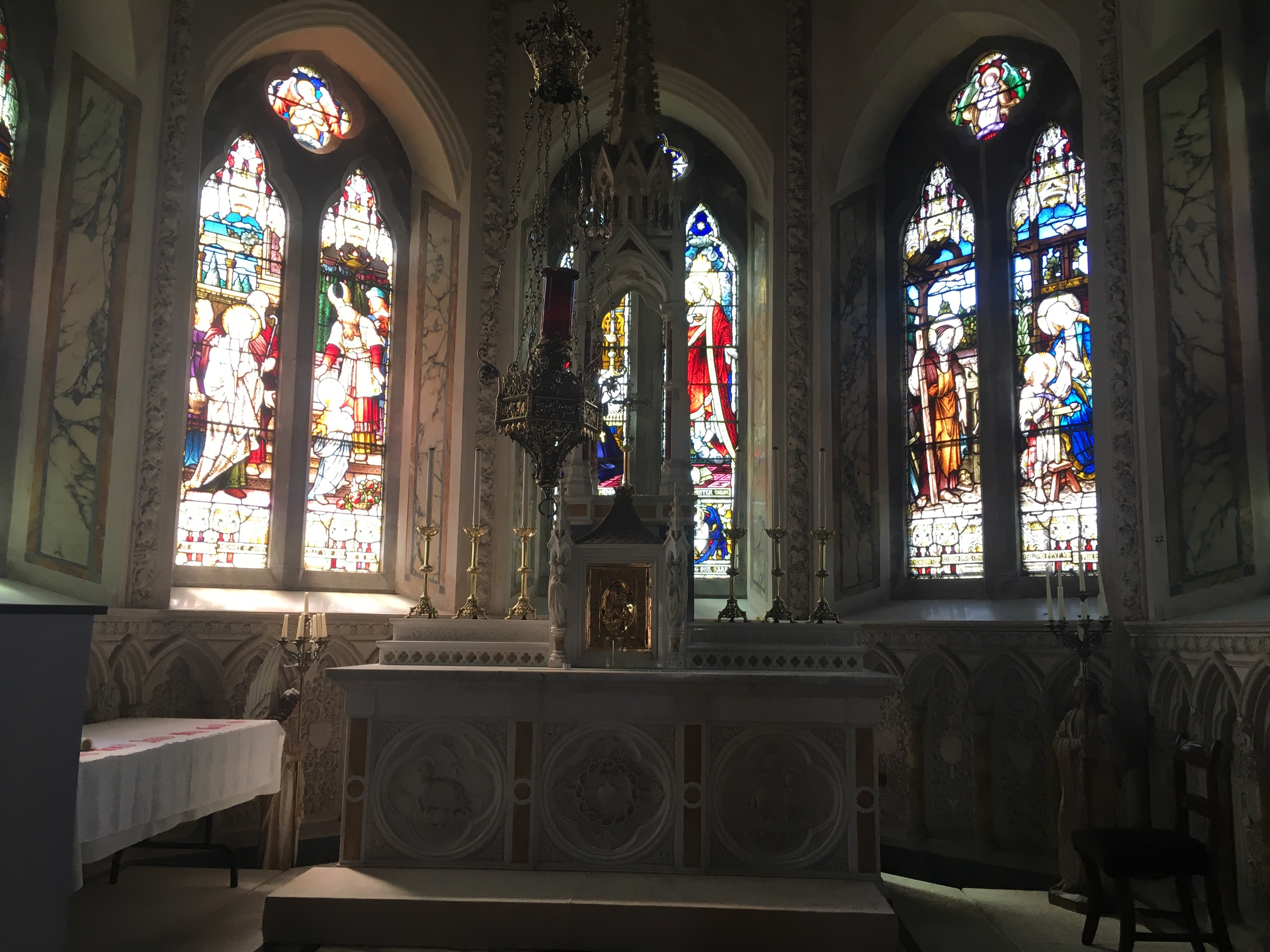
Stained glass windows, Chapel of the Sacred Heart

The Chapel of the Sacred Heart is a neo-gothic chapel attached to Saint Mary's. It was built for a local enclosed order of Presentation Sisters, by the architect C. J. McCarthy in 1886. The major Irish artist Harry Clarke produced six double-lancet stained glass windows for the chapel, which were installed in 1924. The lancets depict scenes from the life of Christ. Clarke was at the time a leading figure in the Arts and Crafts movement and was paid a fee of £1,000 for the works.

Irish traditional music is played in several locations, particularly during the summer tourist season. Dingle has a number of pubs, restaurants and cafes. The aquarium, "Oceanworld Aquarium", is home to tropical, foreign and native animals, and a number of art and craft shops.

Dingle is home to Murphy's Ice Cream, a cafe that serves ice cream and coffee. Murphy's has homemade ice cream made from Kerry cattle. Another business, Dingle Distillery, was launched in 2012.

Gallaunmore, a standing stone and National Monument, lies 3 km (2 miles) to the east.

St. Manchan's Oratory (An Teampall Geal), a medieval oratory with ogham stone and souterrain, lies on nearby Lateeve Hill.

== Sport ==
Dingle is home to the Dingle GAA club, which fields Gaelic football teams. The most noted tournament in which Dingle competes is the Kerry Senior Football Championship. Rugbaí Chorca Dhuibhne, the local rugby team, and Dingle Bay Rovers F.C. are also based in the area.

The yearly Dingle Marathon started in 2009, when John Griffin, a former winner of the Dublin Marathon, won the race at 50 years old. The full marathon begins and ends in Dingle town, taking in Slea Head and the Dingle Peninsula on its route, whilst the half marathon goes from Dingle to Dun Chaoin. The inaugural event had 2,500 participants, and participation peaked at approximately 3,500 participants in 2018. The course is certified by Athletics Ireland.

== Transport ==
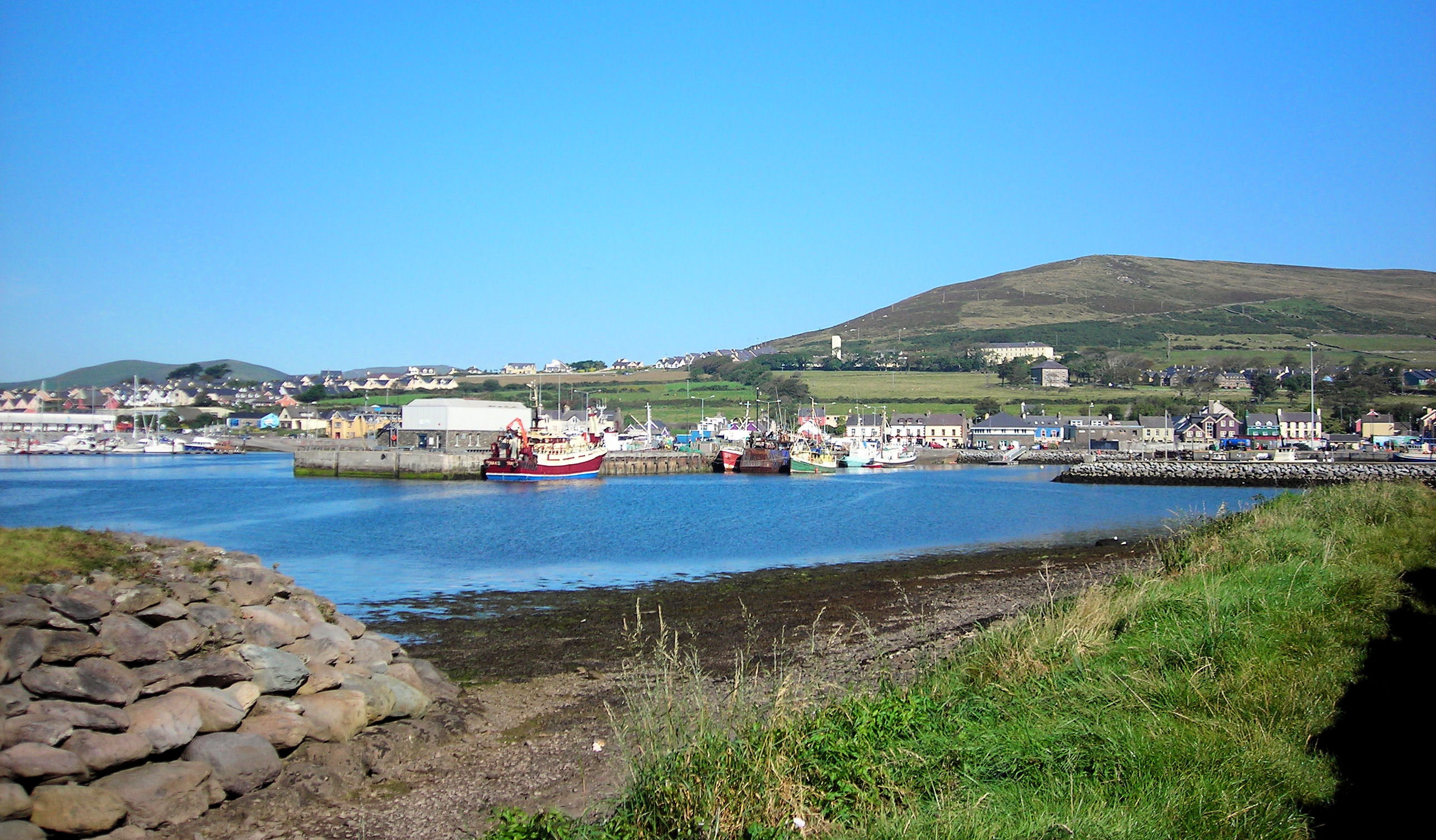
Dingle Harbour

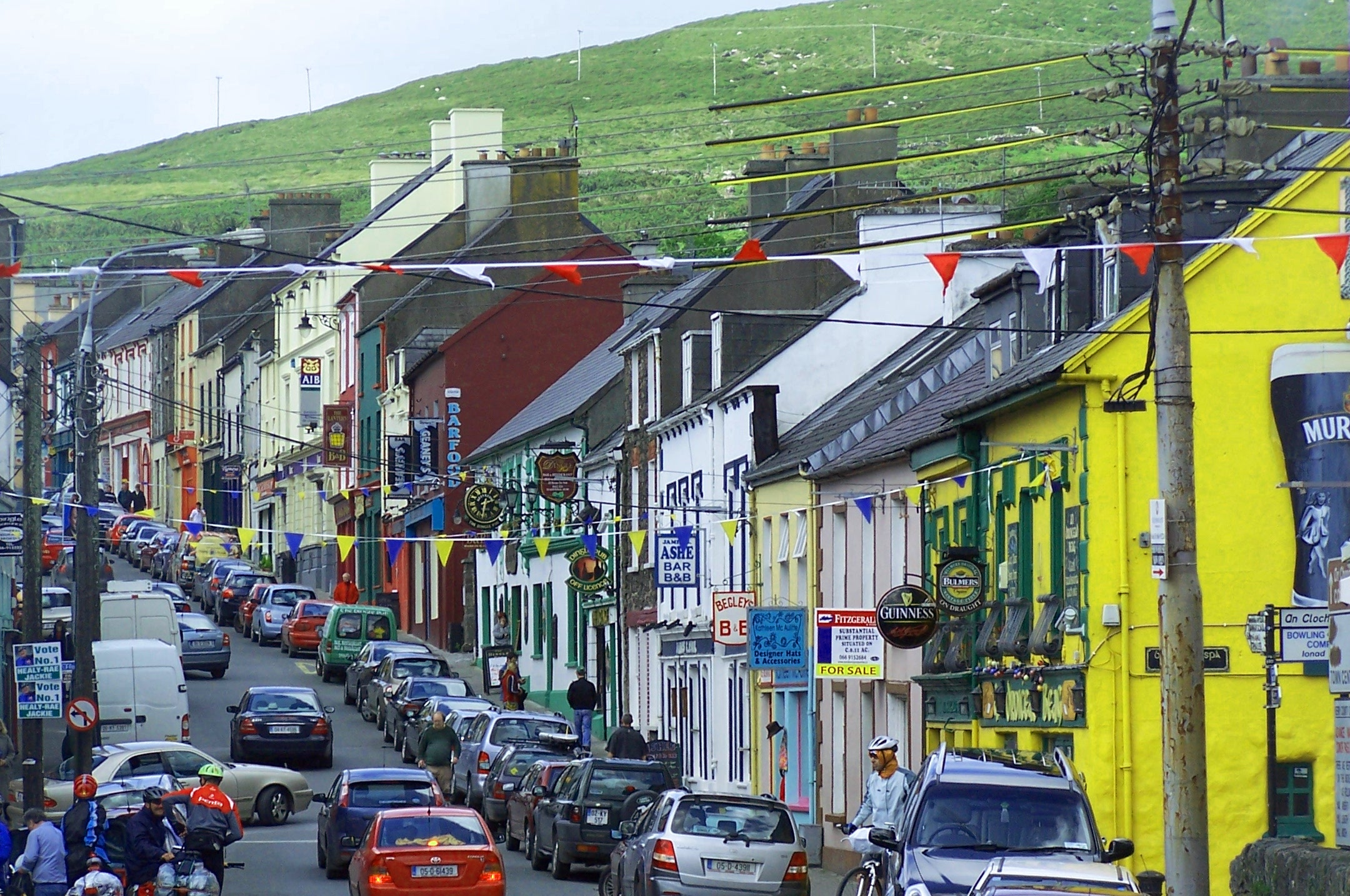
Main Street in central Dingle

Bus routes serving Dingle include routes to Killarney, to Tralee, to Kerry Airport, to Cloghane (via Castlegregory), and to Ballydavid (via Ballyferriter and Dunquin).

Dingle was formerly the western terminus of the narrow-gauge Tralee and Dingle Light Railway, which closed in 1953. The station was sited opposite the hospital, on the N86 road into the town from Lispole, where an undertakers premises and disused petrol station now stand. The railway station opened on 1 April 1891, closed for passenger traffic on 17 April 1939 and for regular goods traffic on 10 March 1947, finally closing altogether on 1 July 1953, by which time a cattle train once per month was the sole operation.

Today, the closest train terminal is Tralee, with bus services operating from Tralee Bus and Rail Stations. In addition, bus services operate from Killarney Bus and Rail Stations to Dingle.

== People ==
- Daniel Cavanagh, former member of the Wisconsin State Assembly and the Wisconsin State Senate
- Joe Higgins, former T.D.
- Mark O'Connor, Australian Football League premiership player (2022) for Geelong Football Club
- Joe O'Toole, Senator
- Pauline Scanlon, singer
- All members of the alternative rock band, Walking on Cars
- Mícheál Ó Muircheartaigh, Gaelic games commentator
- James Louis Rice, Irish count of the Holy Roman Empire
- Patrick James and Margaret Anna Curran McDonald, parents of Richard and Maurice McDonald, founders of McDonald's Restaurants

== Climate ==
Climate data for Dingle, 1991–2020 averages
Month	Jan	Feb	Mar	Apr	May	Jun	Jul	Aug	Sep	Oct	Nov	Dec	Year
Mean daily maximum °C (°F)	9.9 (49.8)	10.1 (50.2)	11.1 (52.0)	12.6 (54.7)	14.8 (58.6)	16.5 (61.7)	17.9 (64.2)	18.0 (64.4)	17.1 (62.8)	14.4 (57.9)	11.9 (53.4)	10.4 (50.7)	13.7 (56.7)
Daily mean °C (°F)	7.4 (45.3)	7.6 (45.7)	8.2 (46.8)	9.6 (49.3)	11.7 (53.1)	13.6 (56.5)	15.3 (59.5)	15.2 (59.4)	14.2 (57.6)	11.7 (53.1)	9.4 (48.9)	8.0 (46.4)	11.0 (51.8)
Mean daily minimum °C (°F)	5.0 (41.0)	5.0 (41.0)	5.3 (41.5)	6.5 (43.7)	8.6 (47.5)	10.7 (51.3)	12.7 (54.9)	12.5 (54.5)	11.2 (52.2)	9.0 (48.2)	7.0 (44.6)	5.6 (42.1)	8.3 (46.9)
Average precipitation mm (inches)	178.3 (7.02)	135.3 (5.33)	112.9 (4.44)	106.0 (4.17)	90.7 (3.57)	99.3 (3.91)	115.3 (4.54)	113.8 (4.48)	125.3 (4.93)	175.0 (6.89)	187.3 (7.37)	178.3 (7.02)	1,617.5 (63.67)
Mean monthly sunshine hours	47.9	64.5	105.4	158.2	182.0	168.8	134.2	143.0	119.6	90.3	54.3	43.6	1,311.8
Source: MeteoStat

== See also ==
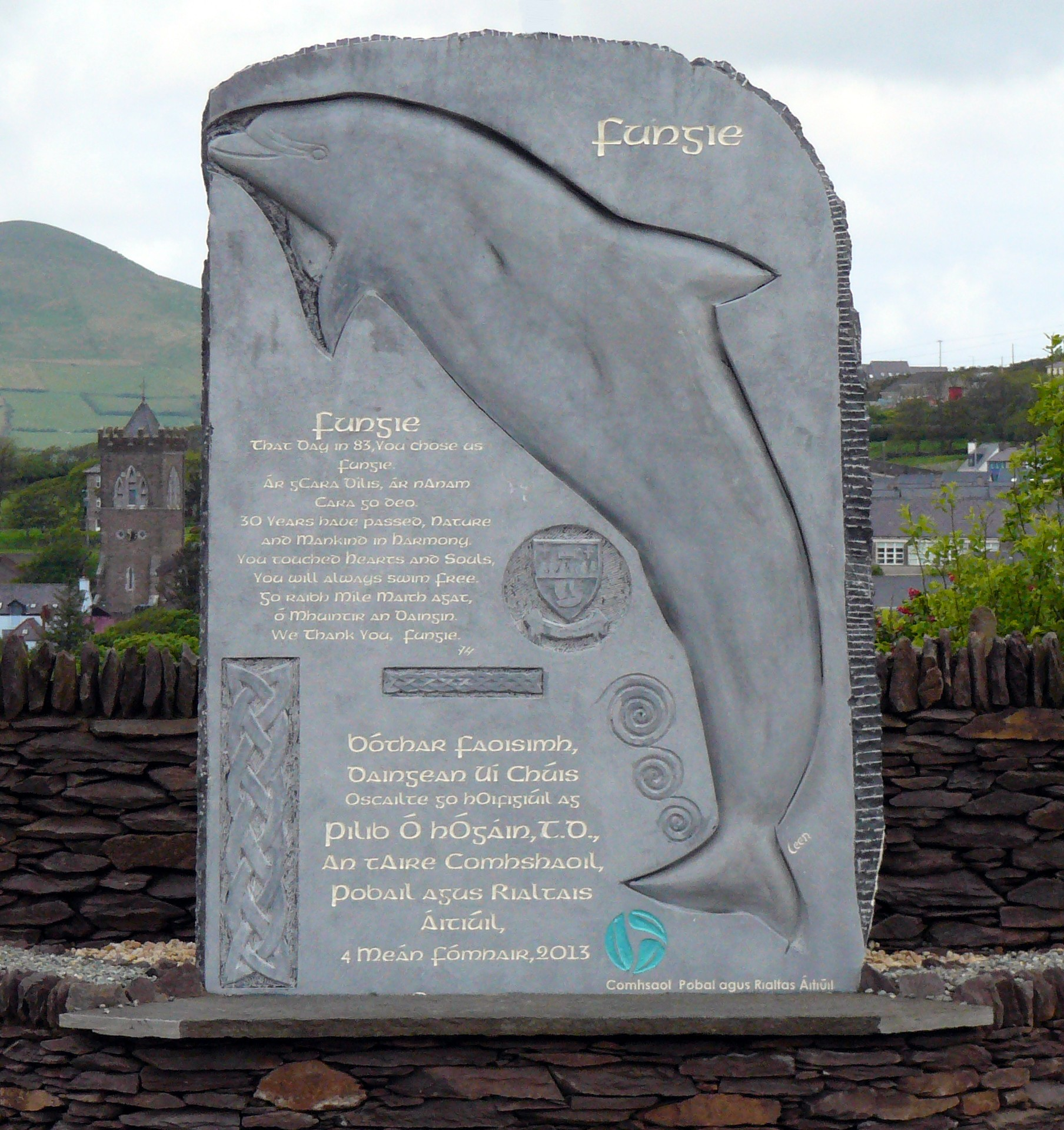
Dolphin Fungie memorial

- Eask Tower
- MV Ranga, a ship wrecked near Slea Head, Dingle
- Wild Atlantic Way
