= Ard na Caithne =

Bay in County Kerry, Ireland

Ard na Caithne Smerwick
- Townland
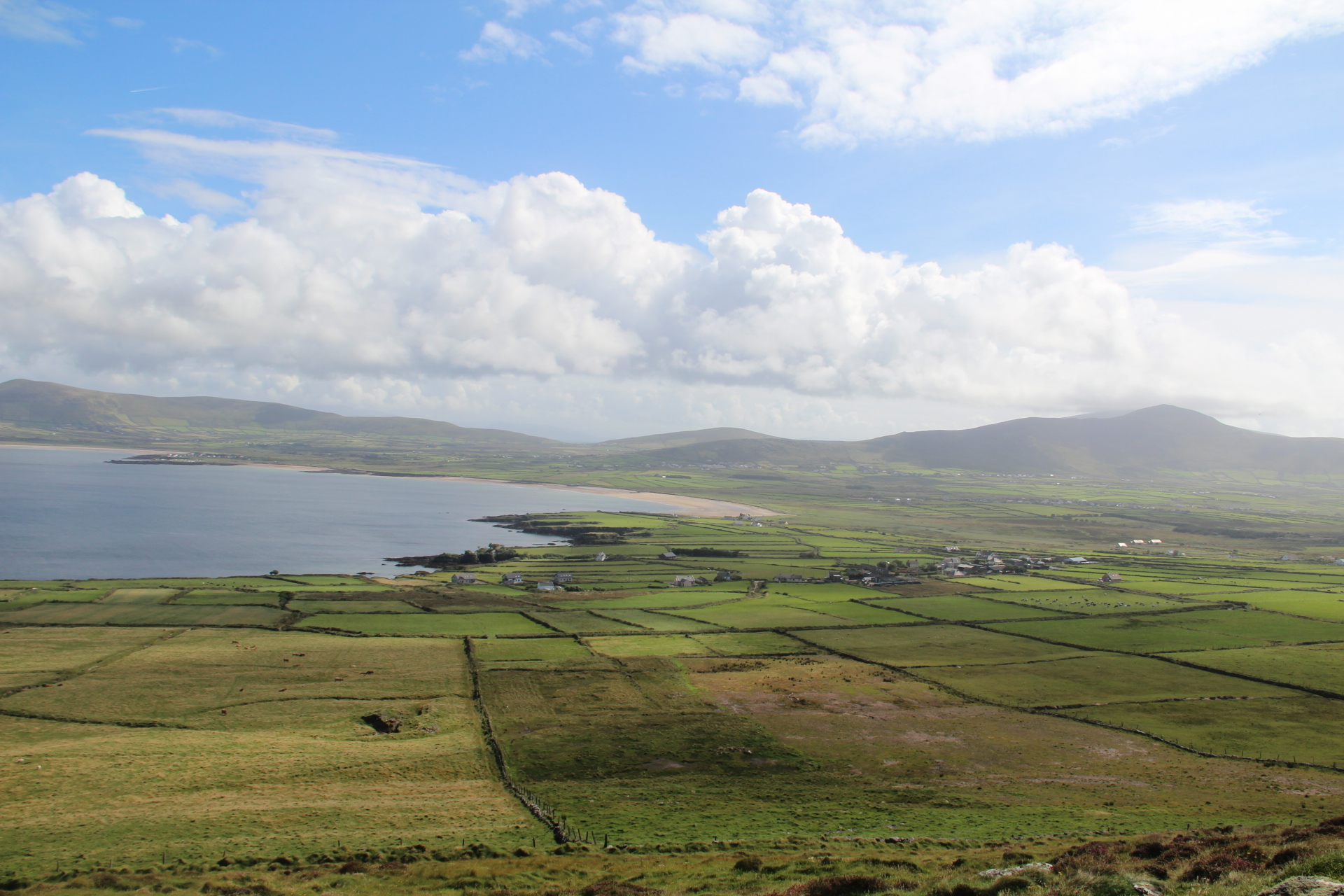
- View over Ard na Caithne

- Location in Ireland
- Coordinates: 52°11′17″N 10°25′14″W
- Country: Ireland
- Province: Munster
- County: County Kerry
- Time zone: UTC+0 (WET)
  - Summer (DST): UTC-1 (IST (WEST))
- Irish Grid Reference: Q347072

Ard na Caithne (Irish pronunciation: [ˈaːɾˠd̪ˠ n̪ˠə ˈkahnʲə]; meaning "height of the arbutus/strawberry tree"), sometimes known in English as Smerwick, is a bay and townland in County Kerry in Ireland. One of the principal bays of Corca Dhuibhne, it is located at the foot of an Triúr Deirfiúr and Mount Brandon. Bounded by the villages of Baile an Fheirtéaraigh, Baile na nGall and Ard na Caithne itself, the area is what has been known as the Fíor-Ghaeltacht, or "true Gaeltacht" (an area in which the Irish language is the official and principal language).

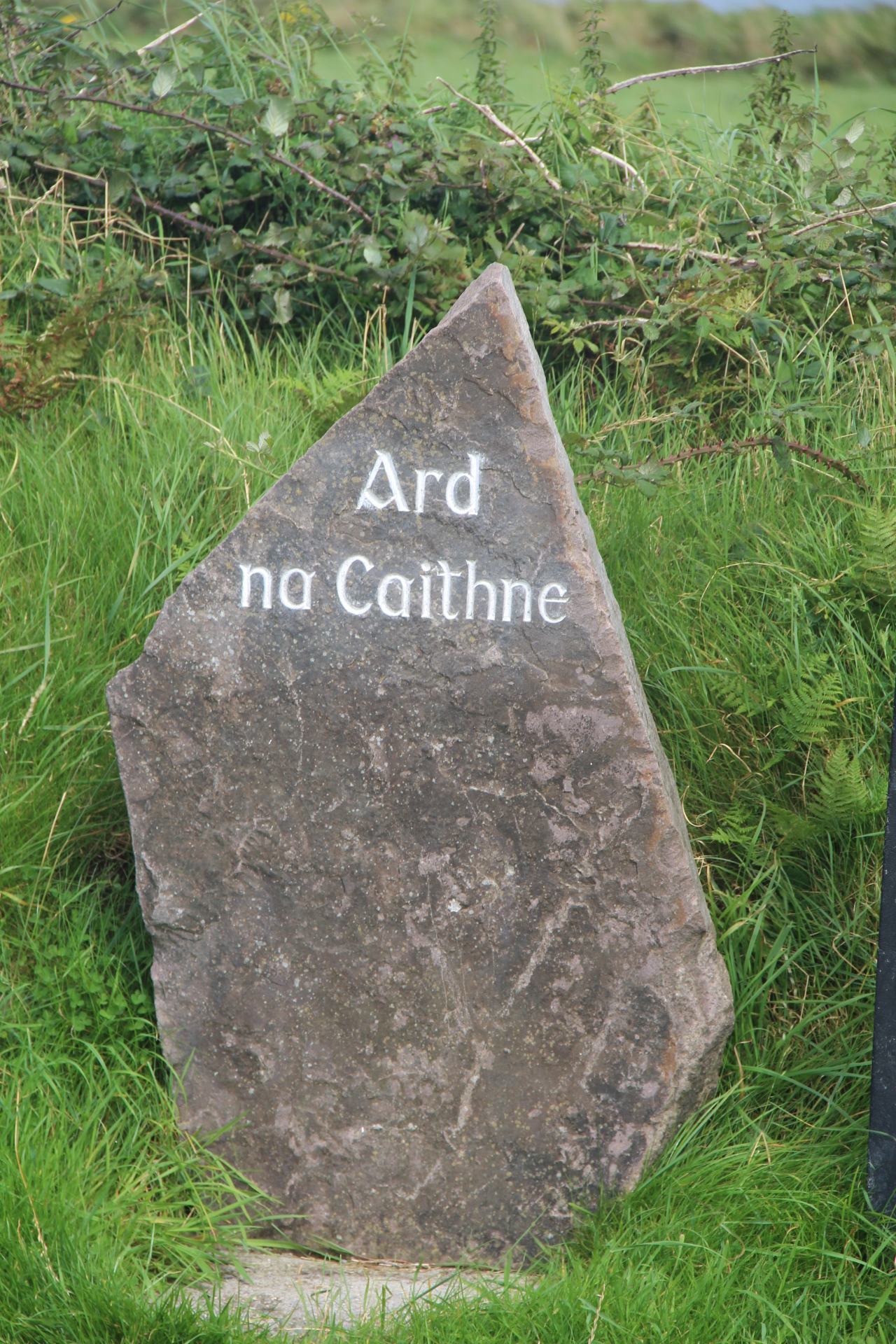
Sign at Ard na Caithne

== Name ==
The area's official and common Irish language name, Ard na Caithne, means "height of the arbutus" or "height of the strawberry tree". Ard na Caithne (formerly anglicised as "Ardnaconnia") was also known in Irish as Iorras Tuaiscirt ("north peninsula") and Gall-Iorras ("peninsula of the strangers").

The area's former English language name, Smerwick, is believed to derive from the Norse (Viking) words smoer and wick meaning "butter harbour".

== History ==
=== Early Christian history ===
The early Christian Gallarus Oratory and Mainistir Riaisc monastic site nearby are central archeological and tourist attractions.

=== Desmond rebellions ===
After the Holy See pronounced that Elizabeth was not Ireland's legitimate queen, James FitzMaurice FitzGerald and other Irish clan chiefs raised their clansmen in what became known as the Second Desmond Rebellion. While FitzGerald himself was killed in August 1579, in September 1580, a force of 600 Italian- and Spanish-origin mercenaries, combined with some Irish and English Catholics, landed with arms for several thousand men to support the rebellion. Commanded by Sebastiano di San Giuseppe, and carrying a banner bearing the coat of arms of FitzMaurice, the force occupied Dún an Óir ('Fort of the Gold') at Ard na Caithne. Dún an Óir was an Iron Age promontory fort located near Ard na Caithne harbour.

San Giuseppe's force was met by English and Irish Royal Army forces, precipitating the Siege of Smerwick. After a 3-day siege, San Giuseppe surrendered to forces under the command of Arthur Grey, 14th Baron Grey de Wilton. Except for 20 or 30 officers, the fort's occupants were all executed immediately following their surrender. Charges for these killings were later brought against Sir Walter Raleigh; he avoided conviction by pleading that he only followed orders from a superior officer.

=== Harbour ===
The harbour where Fitzmaurice's invasion force landed was also the landfall of the returning transatlantic expedition of Sir Martin Frobisher in 1578.

== Notable people ==
In the nearby Caisleán an Fheirtéaraigh lived the 17th-century Irish language bard and Irish clan chief Piaras Feiritéar. He was executed by a Cromwellian general at Killarney in 1653, for having led his clansmen in resistance against the Cromwellian conquest of Ireland. Feiritéar continues to be a folk hero and his poetry remains popular as oral literature among the people of the Dingle peninsula.

== Gallery ==
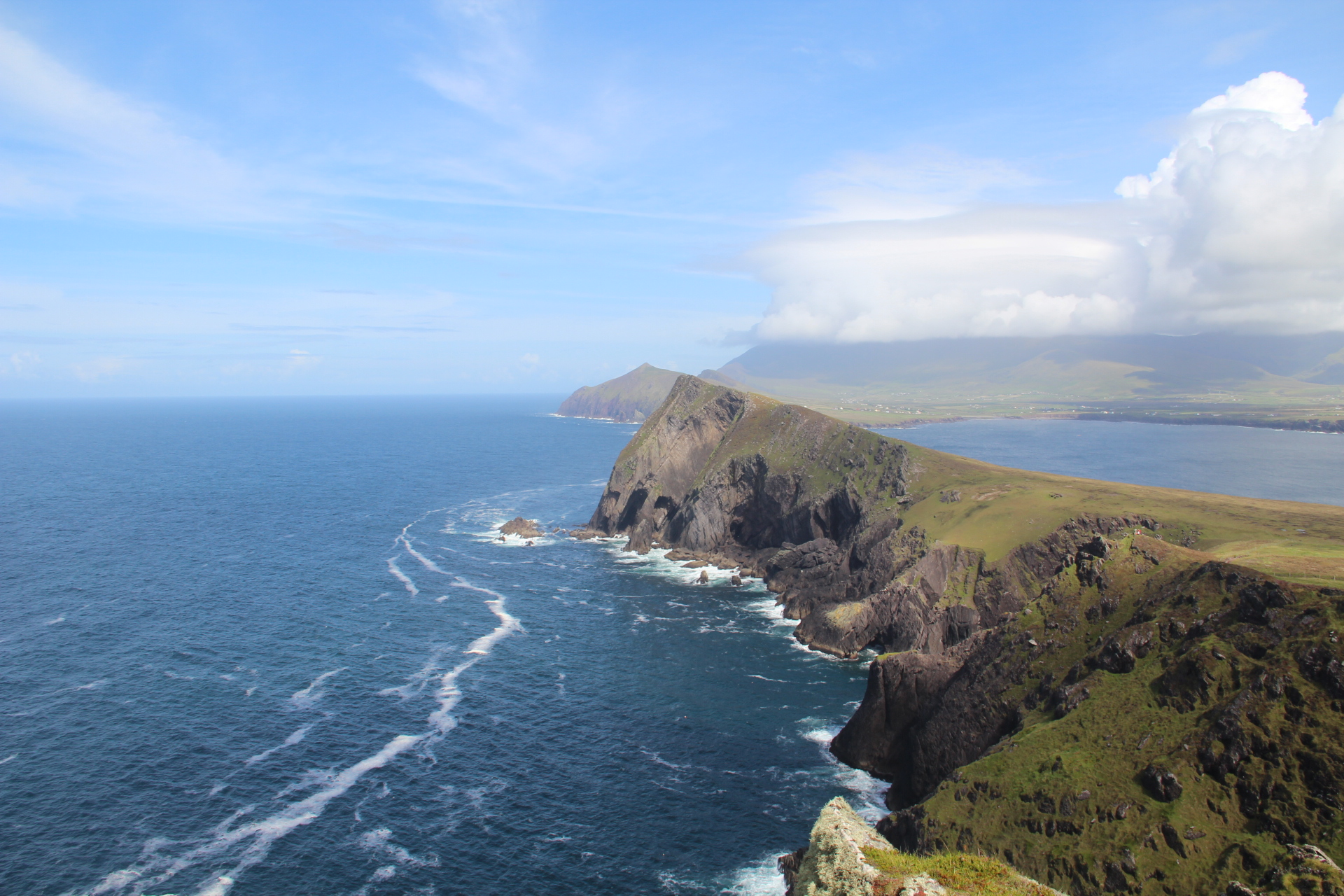
View from An Triúr Deirféar

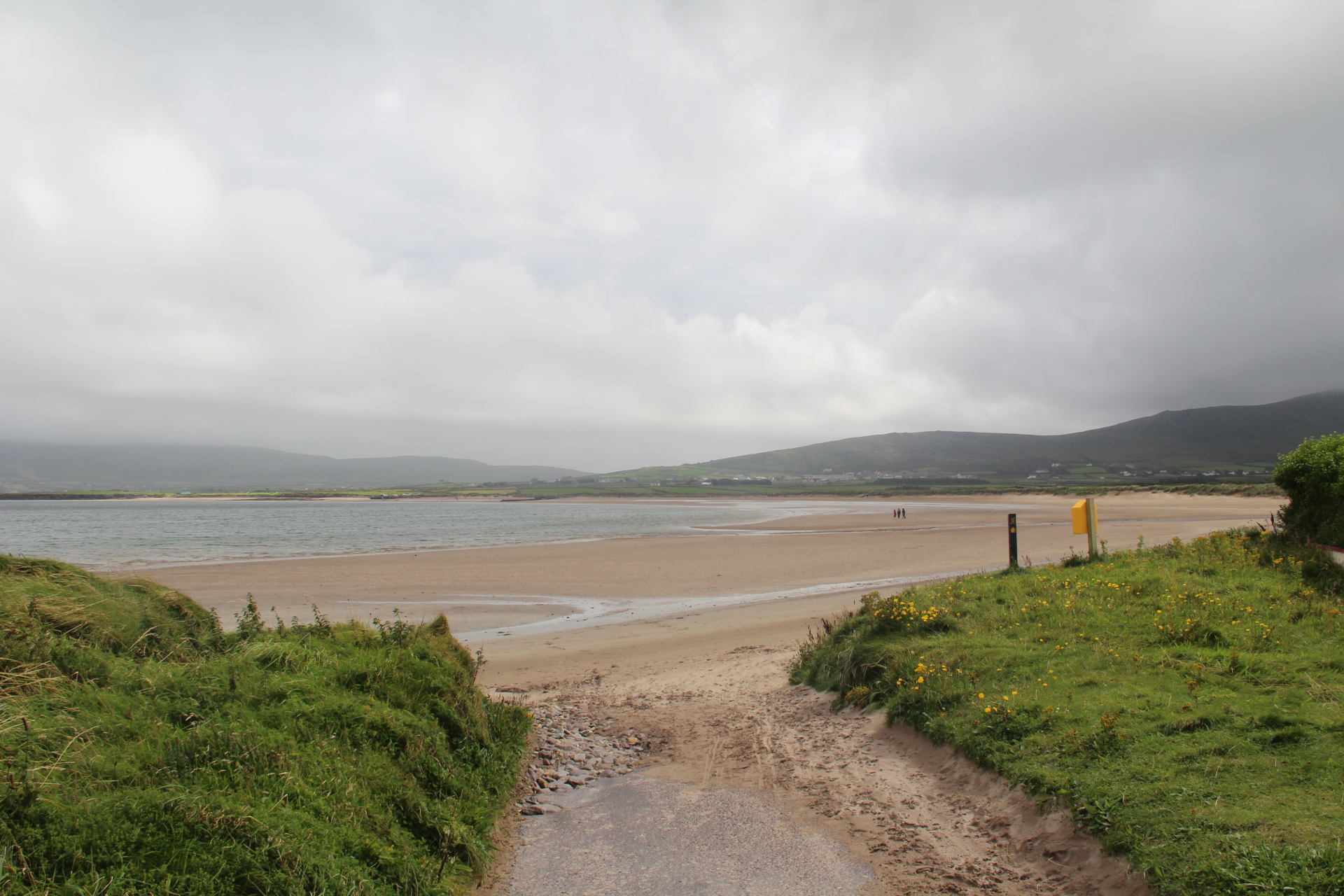
Entrance to Béal Bán Strand, Ard na Caithne

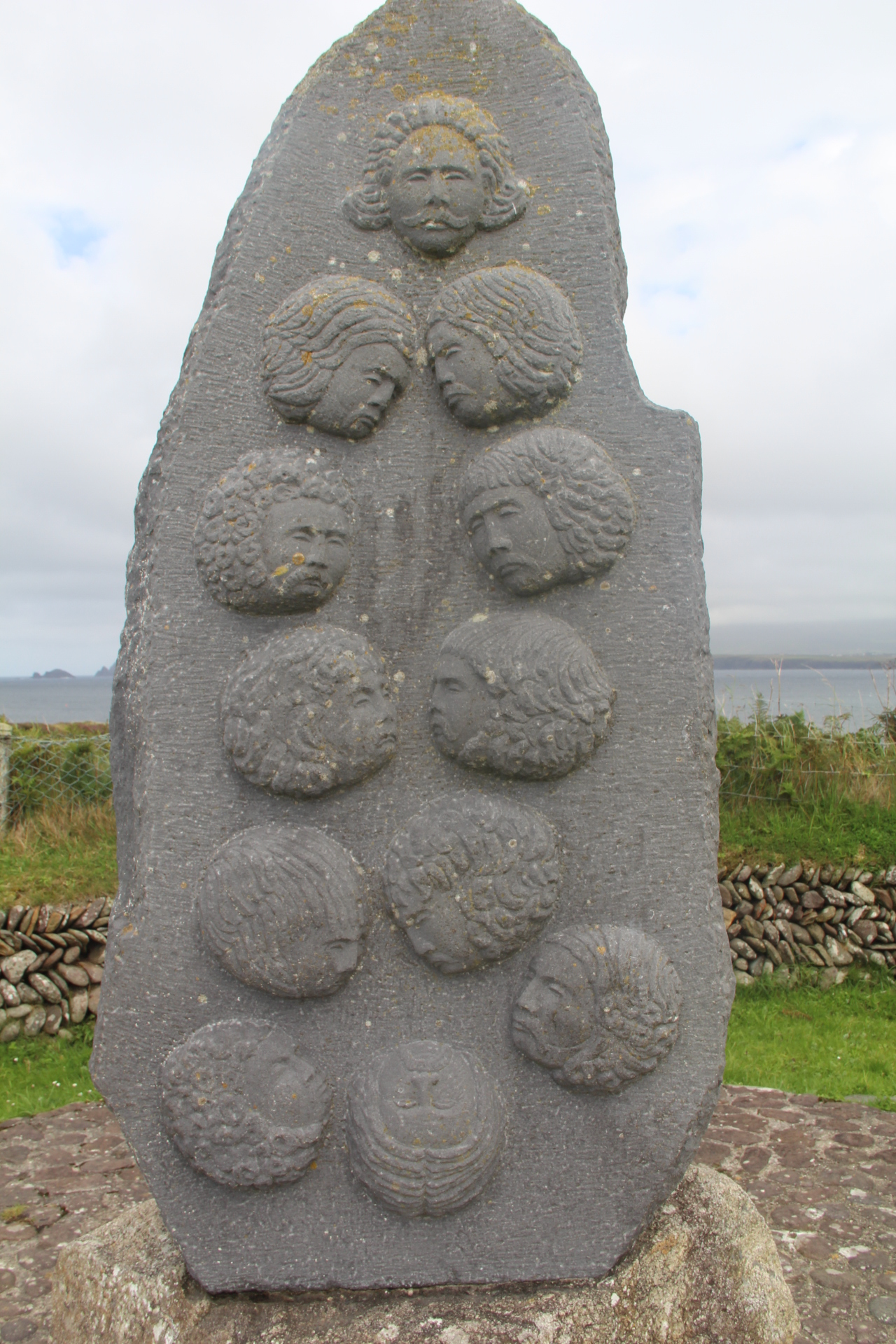
Smerwick massacre memorial

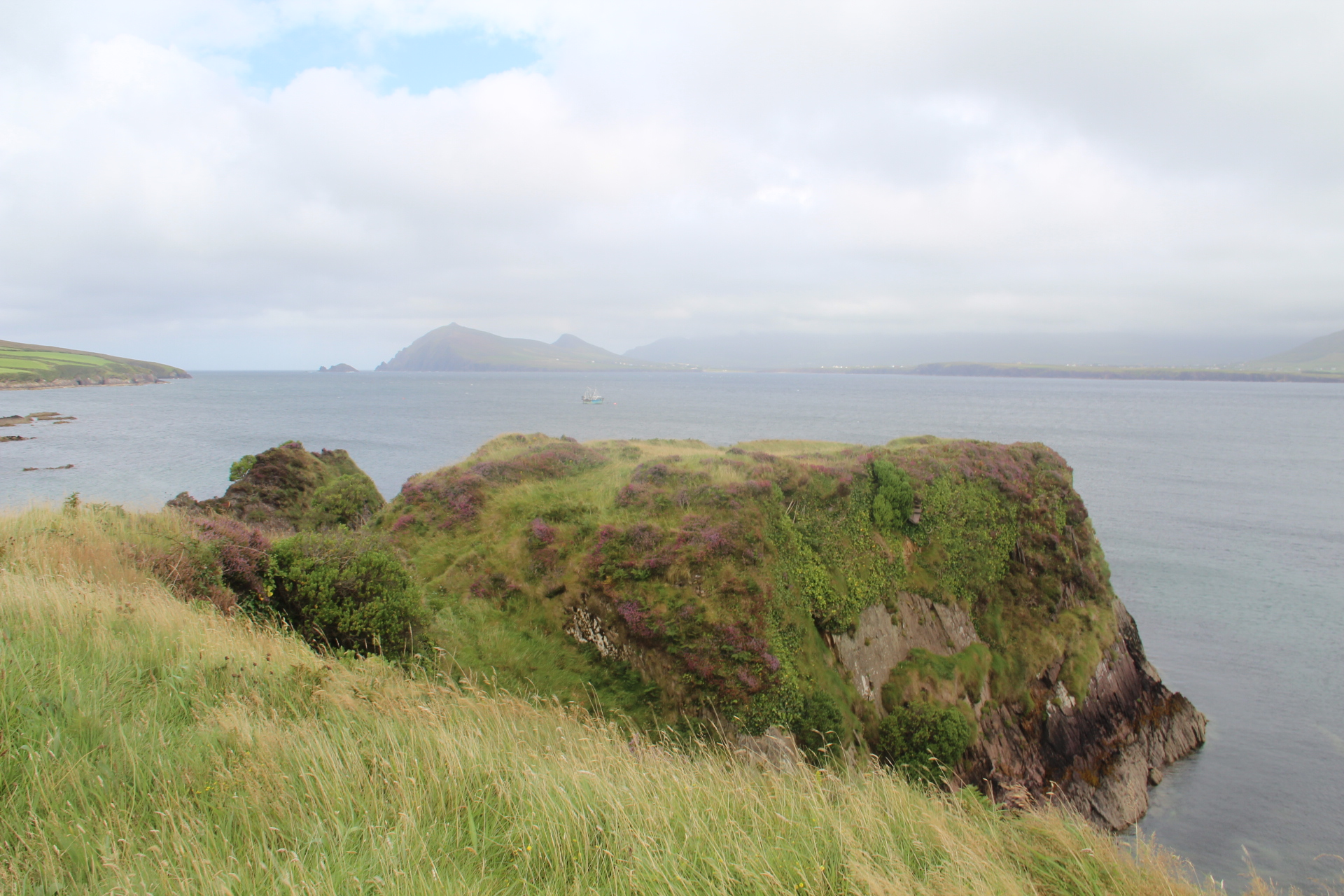
Dún an Óir

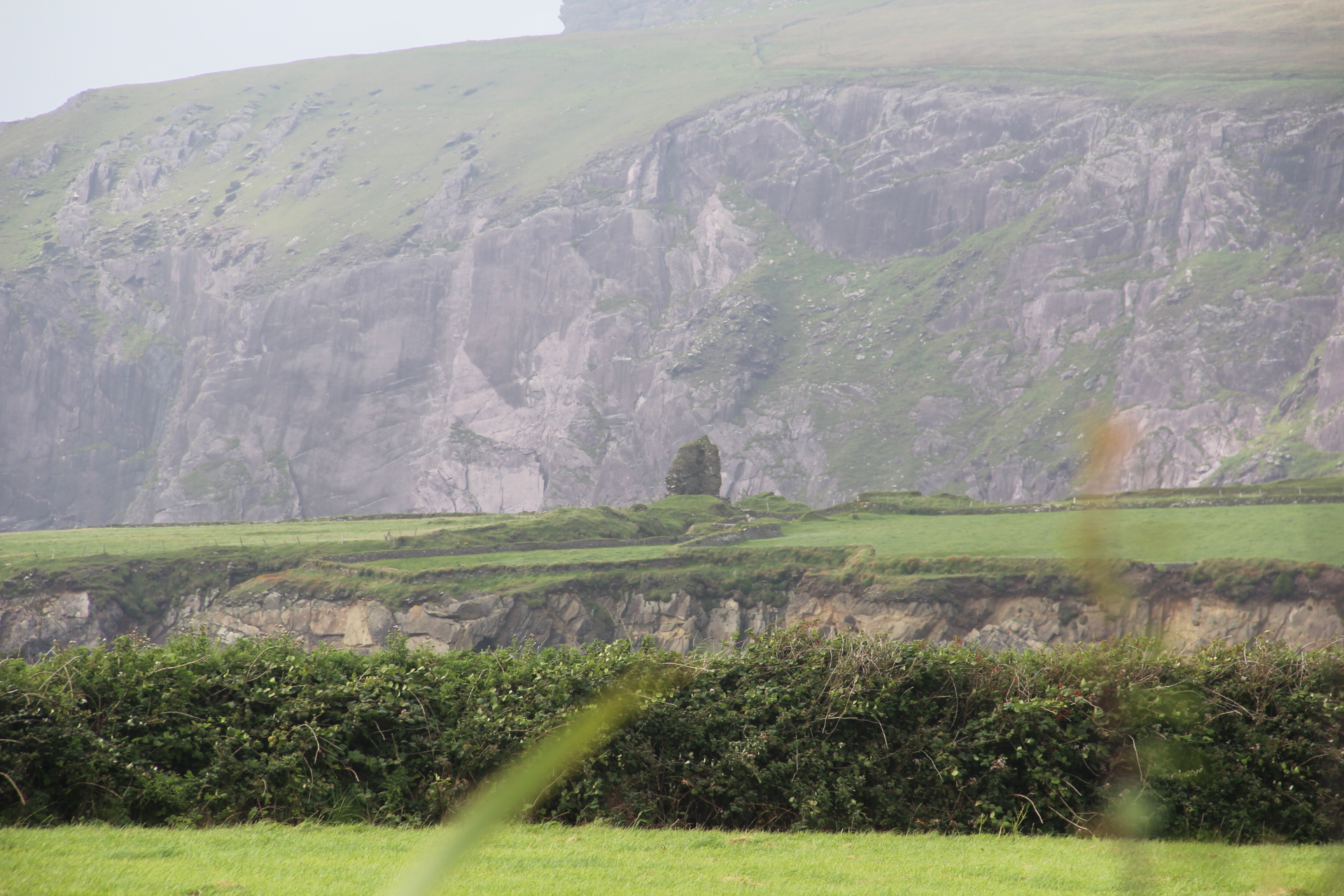
Remains of Caisleán an Fheirtéaraigh, castle of the poet Piaras Feiritéar

== See also ==
- List of abbeys and priories in the Republic of Ireland (County Kerry)
