= Ballyferriter =

Village in County Kerry, Ireland

Baile an Fheirtéaraigh Ballyferriter
- Village
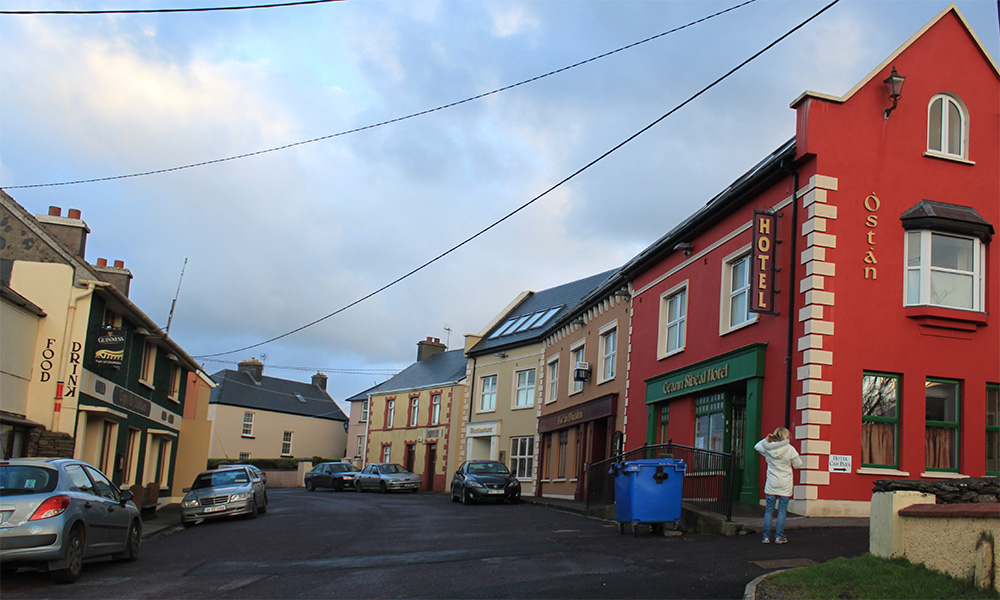
- Ballyferriter, County Kerry, Ireland

- Location in Ireland
- Coordinates: 52°10′31″N 10°24′50″W
- Country: Ireland
- Province: Munster
- County: County Kerry

Government
  - Dáil Éireann: Kerry
- Irish Grid Reference: Q352044
- As this is a Gaeltacht, Baile an Fheirtéaraigh is the only official name.

Baile an Fheirtéaraigh (Irish, meaning 'Ferriter's Townland' [ˈbˠalʲ ənʲ ɛɾʲˈtʲeːɾˠiː]) or Ballyferriter, or also known as An Buailtín, is a Gaeltacht village in County Kerry, Ireland. It is in the west of the Corca Dhuibhne (Dingle) peninsula and according to the 2002 census, about 75% of the town's population speak the Irish language on a daily basis. The village is named after the Norman-Irish Feiritéar family who settled in Ard na Caithne in the late medieval period. The last Chief of the Name was the seventeenth-century Bard and leader Piaras Feiritéar who was executed. The older Irish name for the village An B[h]uailtín ('the little dairy place') is still used locally.

The village lies at the base of Croaghmarhin Hill near Cuan Ard na Caithne ( called Smerwick Harbourin English ) on the Dingle Peninsula, on the R559 regional road which loops around the west of the peninsula, beginning and ending in Dingle Town. It has three pubs and one hotel. It also has a school, church, museum, Músaem Chorca Dhuibhne, the offices of the local co-op (Comharchumann Forbartha Chorca Dhuibhne) and a Garda station.

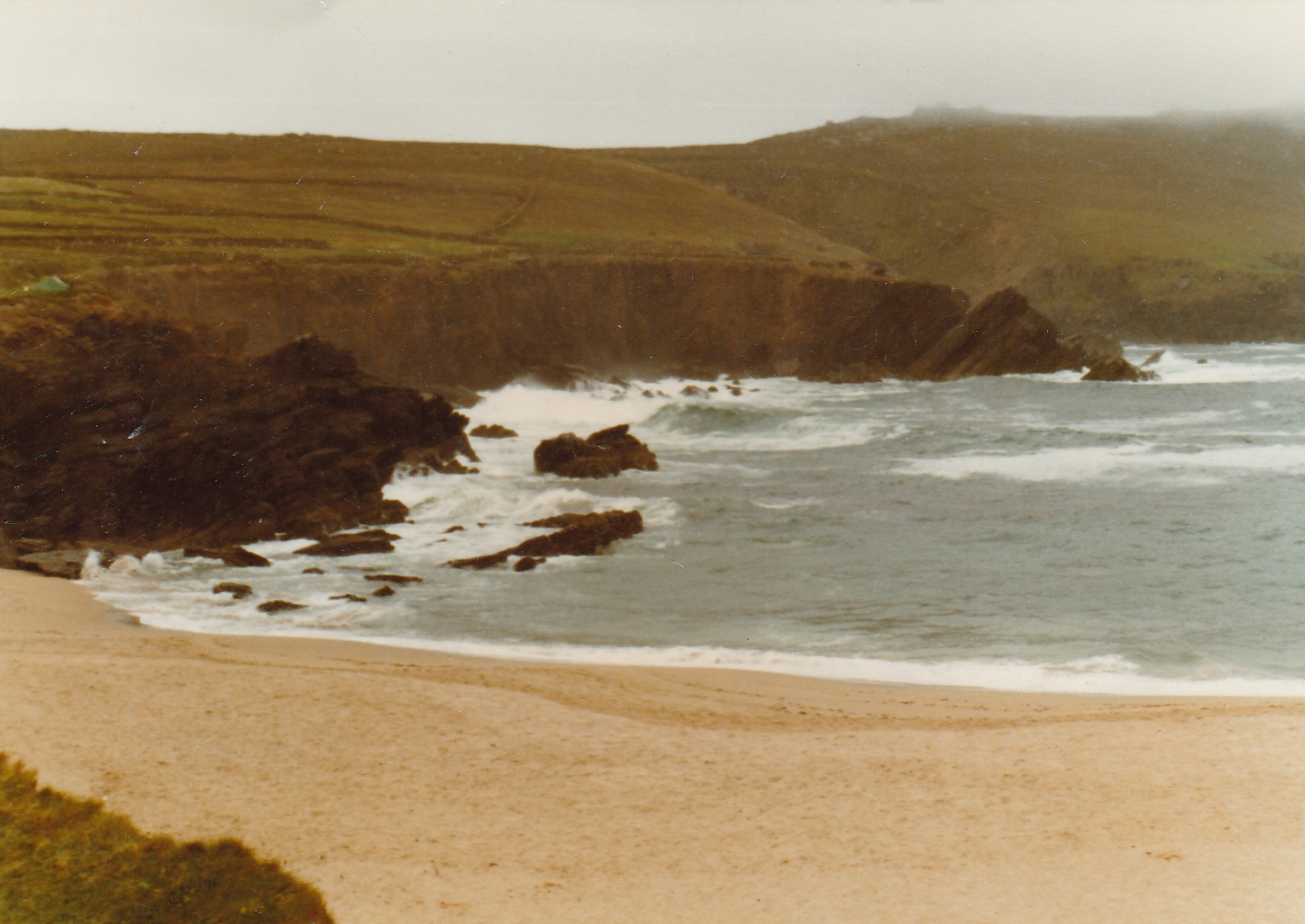
Clogher Beach in 1981

The village is busier throughout the summer due to an influx of Irish students, when both teenagers and adults attend Irish language courses in the local national school and other venues in the village as part of the local Irish colleges. University College Cork also owns a house there that facilitates a year-long study course for students at a higher level.

Between Ballyferriter and Smerwick Harbour is Dún an Óir (the Fort of Gold), an Iron Age promontory fort, which was the location of the Siege of Smerwick, a massacre in 1580. A 600-strong Spanish and Italian Papal invasion force which had come as part of the Second Desmond Rebellion of James Fitzmaurice Fitzgerald were besieged and massacred by the English crown forces of Arthur Grey, 14th Baron Grey de Wilton.

Under a place-names order in 2004, the Minister for the Gaeltacht, Éamon Ó Cuív declared that the Irish place-name (Baile an Fheirtéaraigh) must be used on maps and signage.

== Notable people ==
- Patrick Edward Connor (1820–1891), Irish-American U.S. Army general, notorious for his massacres of Native Americans during the Indian Wars; born in Ballyferriter
