= List of national monuments in County Kerry =

The Irish state has officially approved the following list of national monuments in County Kerry. In Ireland, a structure or site may be deemed to be a "national monument", and therefore worthy of state protection unless the government decides to demolish it. If the land adjoining to the monument is essential to protect it, this land may also be protected.

== National Monuments ==
NM#	Monument name	Description	Image	Townland	Location
56	Annagh Church	Church		Annagh	52°14′54″N 9°45′17″W
430	Ardcanaght Stones	Ogham Stones		Ardcanaght	52°10′10″N 9°43′35″W
54	Ardfert Cathedral	Cathedral & 2 Churches		Ardfert	52°19′44″N 9°46′54″W
358	Ardfert Abbey	Friary (Franciscan)		Ardfert	52°19′49″N 9°46′26″W
221.01	Arraglen Ogham Stone	Ogham Stone		Arraglen (Corkaguiney Barony)	52°15′28″N 10°14′55″W
355	Gallaunmore	Standing stone		Ballineetig	52°08′21″N 10°13′22″W
221.1416	Ballinknockane	Burial ground & possible church		Ballinknockane (Kilquane civil parish)	52°14′00″N 10°17′53″W
221.1416	Ballinknockane	Hut sites		Ballinknockane (Kilquane civil parish)	52°14′03″N 10°17′30″W
221.1416	Ballinknockane	Hut site & souterrain		Ballinknockane (Kilquane civil parish)	52°14′12″N 10°17′37″W
168	Ballinskelligs Abbey	Priory (Augustinian)		Ballinskelligs	51°48′55″N 10°16′18″W
64	Ballintaggart Ogham Stones	Ogham Stones		Ballintaggart	52°07′40″N 10°14′35″W
221	Ballybowler North Ogham Stone	Ogham Stone		Ballybowler North	52°10′36″N 10°13′21″W
364	Ballymalis Castle	Castle		Ballymalis	52°05′05″N 9°41′33″W
62	Teampall Geal (St. Manchan's Oratory)	Early Medieval Ecclesiastical Site & ogham stone		Ballymorereagh	52°09′16″N 10°19′53″W
221.0712	Cathair na BhFionnúrach	Stone fort, huts & souterrain		Ballynavenooragh	52°13′34″N 10°17′53″W
221.0712	Ballynavenooragh	Stone fort & hut		Ballynavenooragh	52°13′38″N 10°17′48″W
221.2425	Cathair na gCat	Cashel & Ogham Stone		Ballywiheen	52°09′22″N 10°24′27″W
221.2425	Ballywiheen	Early Medieval Ecclesiastical Site		Ballywiheen	52°09′32″N 10°24′25″W
380, 492	Beenbane	Calluragh, hut sites, cross slab, enclosure, souterrain, cross, standing stones		Beenbane	51°49′55″N 10°09′25″W
500	Beginish house	Stone-built house		Beginish	51°56′20″N 10°17′24″W
184	Caherconree Fort	Promontory Fort (Inland)		Caherconree	52°11′51″N 9°51′47″W
221.4748	Caherdorgan North Cashel	Cashel		Caherdorgan North	52°10′45″N 10°20′22″W
221.4748	The Chancellor's House	Building - medieval		Caherdorgan North	52°10′54″N 10°20′18″W
238	Callanafersy (Lisgortnageragh)	Ringfort		Callanafersy West	52°08′13″N 9°46′28″W
249	Carrigafoyle Castle	Castle		Ballylongford	52°34′12″N 9°29′39″W
59	Church Island (Valentia Harbour)	Early Medieval Ecclesiastical Site		Beginish	51°56′15″N 10°17′00″W
60	Church Island (Lough Currane)	Early Medieval Ecclesiastical Site		Lough Currane	51°50′07″N 10°07′49″W
228	Cloghanecarhan	Ringfort & Ogham Stone		Cloghanecarhan	51°53′18″N 10°11′02″W
385	Dunloe Ogham Stones	Ogham Stones		Coolmagort	52°03′36″N 9°38′05″W
346	Darrynane Beg Ogham Stone	Ogham Stone		Derrynane	51°45′51″N 10°07′19″W
221.45	Doonmore	Promontory Fort		Doonsheane	52°07′07″N 10°13′19″W
221.46	Emlagh East Ogham Stone	Ogham Stone		Emlagh East (Dingle civil parish)	52°07′54″N 10°13′00″W
391	Emlagh East Cashel	Cashel		Emlagh East (Dingle civil parish)	52°07′58″N 10°13′31″W
177	Dunbeg Fort	Promontory Fort		Fahan	52°06′12″N 10°24′31″W
65	Gallarus Castle	Castle		Baile na nGall	52°10′33″N 10°21′21″W
66	Gallarus Oratory	Early Medieval Ecclesiastical Site		Baile na nGall	52°10′22″N 10°20′58″W
64	Garfinny	Cemetery		Garfinny	52°08′53″N 10°14′03″W
612	Garfinny Bridge	Bridge		Garfinny/Flemingstown	52°08′59″N 10°13′38″W
156	Cathair Sayer	Clochaun		Glanfahan	52°06′00″N 10°26′17″W
156	Cathair Martín	Clochaun		Glanfahan	52°06′07″N 10°25′29″W
156	Cathair Murphy	Clochaun		Glanfahan	52°06′03″N 10°26′03″W
156	Cathair Síleoid	Clochán		Glanfahan	
156	Caher Conor	Cashel		Glanfahan	52°06′06″N 10°25′17″W
221.33	Glin North	Clochán & stone fort		Glin North	52°10′52″N 10°16′53″W
221.34	Glin North	Cashel		Glin North	52°10′49″N 10°17′09″W
63	Rinn an Chaisleáin	Church site		Great Blasket Island	52°06′19″N 10°30′40″W
61	Skellig Michael	Early Medieval Ecclesiastical Site		Great Skellig	51°46′20″N 10°32′19″W
67	Illauntannig	Early Medieval Ecclesiastical Site		Illauntannig	52°19′34″N 10°01′12″W
63	Inishtooskert	Early Medieval Ecclesiastical Site		Inishtooskert	52°04′55″N 10°34′05″W
63	Inishvickillane	Early Medieval Ecclesiastical Site		Inishvickillane	52°02′39″N 10°36′31″W
183	Innisfallen Abbey	Church, Oratory & Abbey (Benedictine)		Innisfallen Island	52°02′48″N 9°33′15″W
329	Kilcoolaght East ogham stones	Ogham Stones		Kilcoolaght East	52°04′26″N 9°44′46″W
593	Killelton Church	Church		Killelton	52°13′41″N 9°52′26″W
65	Kilmalkedar	Early Medieval Ecclesiastical Site		Kilmalkedar	52°11′06″N 10°20′11″W
221.22	Keelers' Stone	Bullaun Stone		Kilmalkedar	52°11′08″N 10°20′18″W
221.23	St. Brendan's Oratory	Church		Kilmalkedar	52°11′05″N 10°20′11″W
227	Cahergall	Cashel		Kimego West	51°57′21″N 10°15′28″W
414	Leacanabuaile	Cashel		Kimego West	51°57′30″N 10°15′43″W
258	Lislaughtin Abbey	Friary (Franciscan)		Lislaughtin	52°33′27″N 9°28′12″W
260	Listowel Castle	Castle		Listowel	52°26′40″N 9°29′13″W
611	Loher Cashel	Cashel		Loher	51°47′10″N 10°09′56″W
221.02	Maumanorig	Early Medieval Ecclesiastical Site		Maumanorig	52°08′38″N 10°21′31″W
311	Muckross Abbey	Friary (Franciscan)		Killarney National Park	52°01′34″N 9°29′42″W
53	Aghadoe	Early Medieval Ecclesiastical Site		Parkavonear	52°04′36″N 9°33′16″W
236	Parkavonear Castle	Castle		Parkavonear	52°04′33″N 9°33′18″W
10001	Illaunloughan	Early Medieval Ecclesiastical Site		Portmagee	51°53′12″N 10°22′25″W
221.21	Rahinnane Castle	Castle, Ringfort and Souterrain		Rahinnane	52°08′35″N 10°22′59″W
57	Ratass Church	Church & Ogham Stone		Ratass	52°16′01″N 9°40′55″W
55	Rattoo	Early Medieval Ecclesiastical Site		Rattoo	52°26′33″N 9°39′00″W
519	Reask	Early Medieval Ecclesiastical Site		Reask	52°10′03″N 10°23′16″W
221.35	Reenconnell	Early Medieval Ecclesiastical Site		Reenconnell	52°11′07″N 10°18′11″W
534	Ross Castle	Castle		Ross Island	52°02′28″N 9°31′53″W
221.27	Dún an Óir (Fort del Oro)	Promontory Fort		Smerwick	52°11′27″N 10°24′52″W
143	Staigue	Cashel		Sneem	51°48′18″N 10°00′56″W
303	Tonaknock Cross	Cross		Tonaknock	52°22′59″N 9°41′54″W
295	Tullygarran ogham stones	Two Ogham Stones		Tullygarran	52°16′33″N 9°38′33″W

== Sources ==
- National Monuments in County Kerry
