= Chancellor House =

Chancellor House or Chancellor's Residence or similar may refer to:

in Ireland

- The Chancellor's House, medieval stone building in County Kerry

in South Africa

- Chancellor House, a South African holding company managing investments for the African National Congress;
- Chancellor House, a historic building in Johannesburg, South Africa

in the United States

- Chancellor House (Harpersfield, Alabama), listed on the National Register of Historic Places in Alabama
- Chancellor's Residence (University of Pittsburgh)
