= Glin North =

- Na Gleannta Thuaidh (Irish)
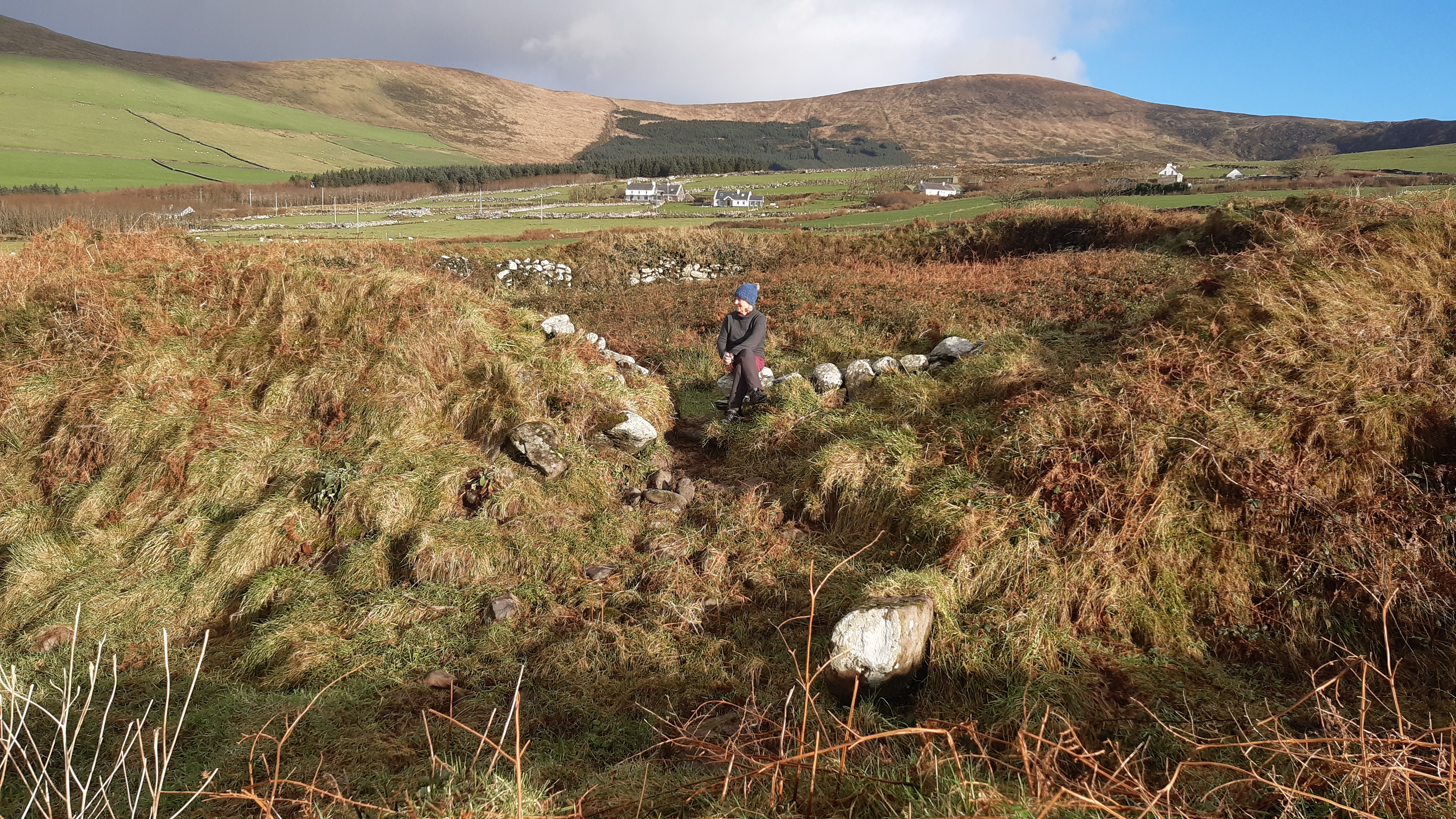
- The ringfort in December 2025

- Location within Ireland
- 52.182270°N 10.286048°W
- Type: stone fort, clocháns
- Etymology: northern part of the valley
- Location: Glin North, Ballyhea, Dingle Peninsula, County Kerry

History
- Built: 5th–8th centuries

Site notes
- Owner: state

National monument of Ireland
- Official name: Glin North Clochán & stone fort, Cashel
- Reference no.: 221.33/34

Glin North is the location of a National Monument in County Kerry, Ireland.

== Location ==
Glin North is located 4.9 kilometres (3.0 mi) north-northwest of Dingle, to the south of the Milltown River and west of Scragg mountain.

== Description ==
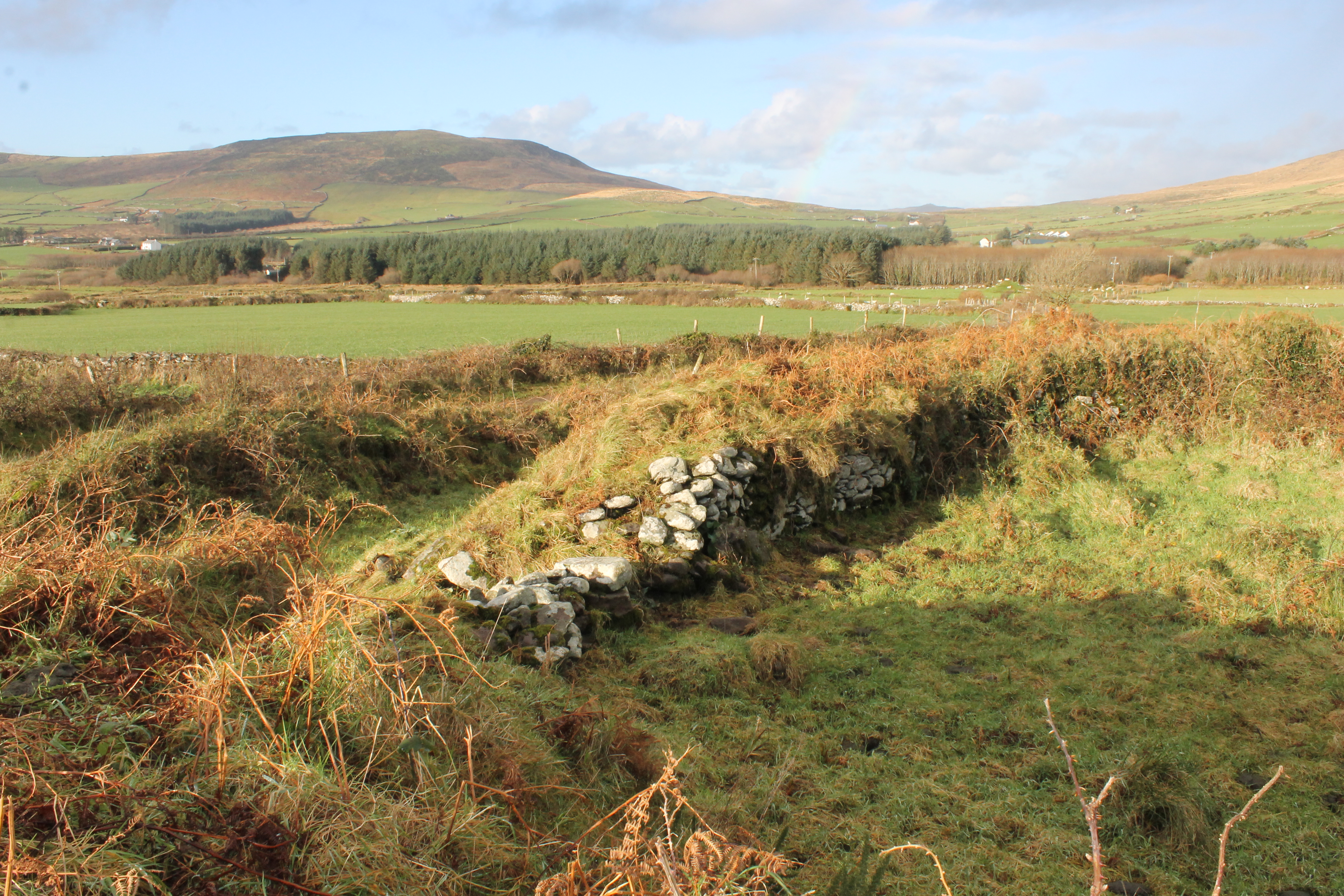
Drystone-masonry within the monument

The national monument consists of a clochán, stone fort and cashel. The cashel (stone ringfort) covers 650 m^{2} (0.16 acres) internally.

The archaeologist and author Peter Harbison described the monument in his 1970 work "Guide to the National and Historic Monuments of Ireland": A stone fort with two concentric walls enclosing the remains of some beehive huts. One of these had a stone-paved path leading up to its entrance.
