= Cloghanecarhan =

- Clochán Cárthainn (Irish)
- Location within Ireland
- 51.888436°N 10.184025°W
- Type: ogham and ringfort
- Location: Cloghanecarhan, Caher, County Kerry, Ireland

History
- Built: c. AD 600

Site notes
- Elevation: 78 m (256 ft)
- Owner: state

National monument of Ireland
- Official name: Cloghanecarhan Ringfort & Ogham Stone
- Reference no.: 228

Cloghanecarhan is a ringfort and ogham stone (CIIC 230) forming a National Monument located in County Kerry, Ireland.

== Location ==
Cloghanecarhan lies on the western end of the Iveragh Peninsula, 7.2 kilometres (4.5 mi) south-southeast of Cahersiveen.

== History ==
The ogham stone was erected some time in the Middle Ages; based on the grammar, it is a late inscription, c. AD 600. Next to it is a stone cashel used for later Christian burials.

== Description ==
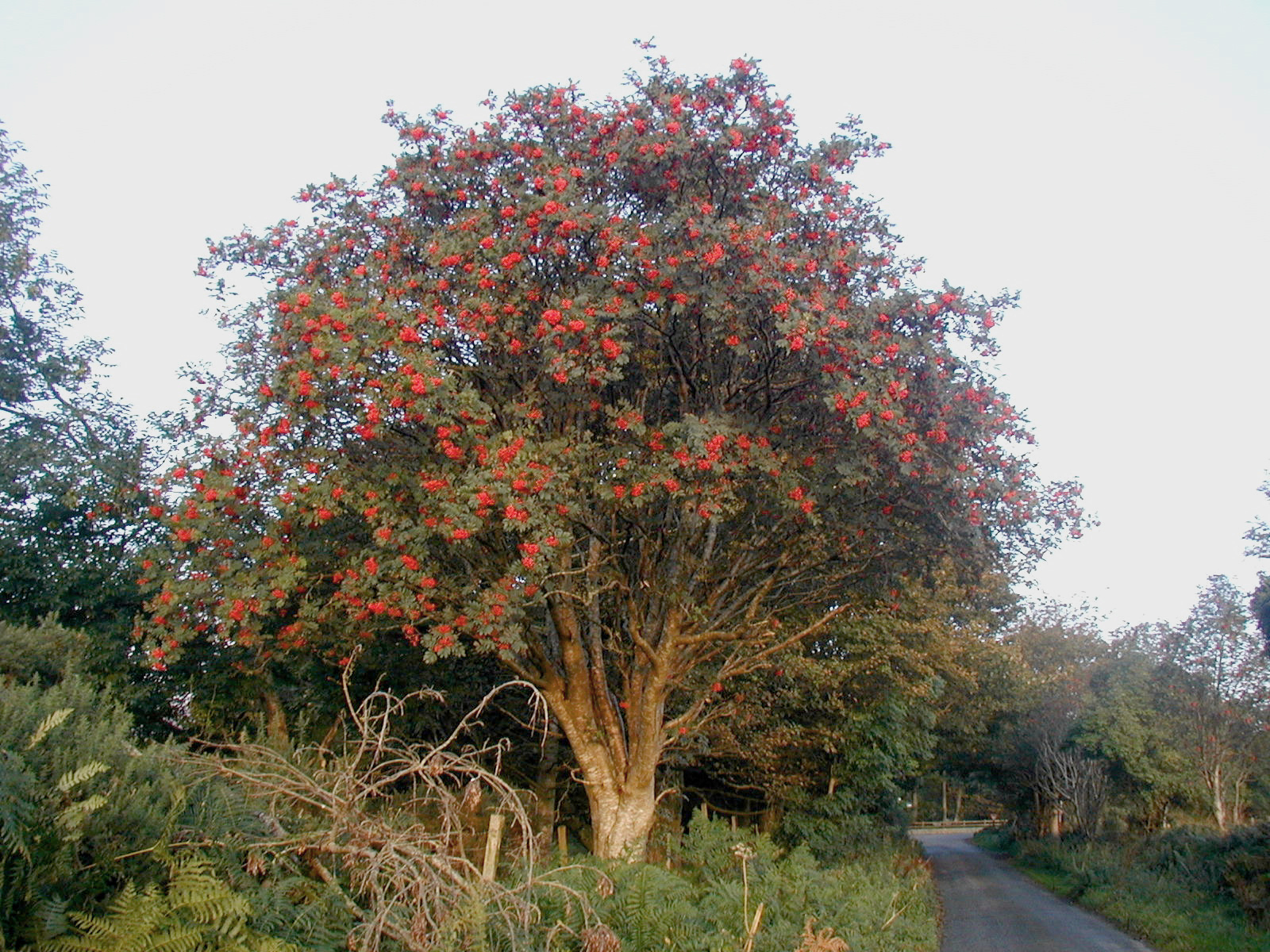
Rowan tree. Traditionally it was believed to ward off malevolent spirits.

The ogham stone originally stood at the east entrance of the ringfort but now lies to the north. It is slate, 208 × 38 × 18 cm. The inscription reads EQQẸGGNỊ [MA]Q̣[I] ṂẠQI-CAṚATTỊNN ("'of Ec...án? son of Mac-Cáirthinn"); this is overwritten on an earlier inscription, D[ ... ]A[.C.] AVI DALAGNI [MAQI C--. The same name, in the form MAQI-CAIRATINI, appears on an ogham stone in Painestown (CIIC 40), and it means "devotee of the rowan." The first element of the townland name could mean either "ford of stepping-stones" (there is a small stream, the Direen, to the east) or to a stone beehive hut, such as is found in the cashel.

The ringfort was known locally as 'Keeldarragh'; it is circular and enclosed by a bank with entrance at east and "pillars" at the west end. Inside is a circular hut, three leachta, a souterrain and a cross slab.
