= Church Island (Valentia Harbour) =

Medieval monastery in Valentia Harbour, Ireland

- Oileán an Teampaill
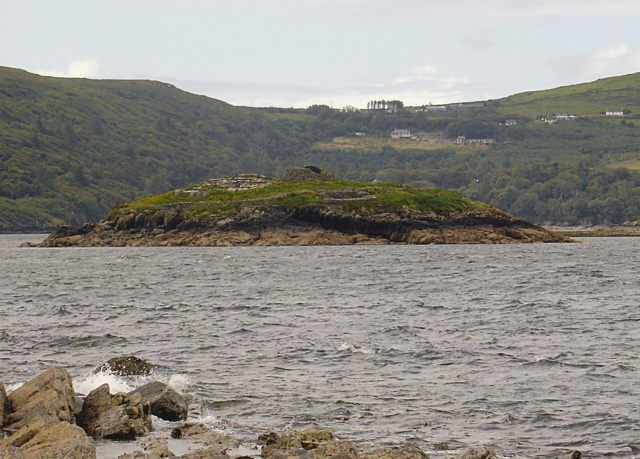

- Location within Ireland

Monastery information
- Established: 6th–7th century AD
- Disestablished: before 1100
- Diocese: Kerry

Architecture
- Status: ruined
- Style: Celtic

Site
- Location: Valentia Harbour, County Kerry
- Coordinates: 51.937597°N 10.283343°W
- Public access: yes

National monument of Ireland
- Official name: Church Island (Valentia Harbour) Early Medieval Ecclesiastical Site
- Reference no.: 59

Church Island (Irish: Oileán an Teampaill), is a small, elevated island lying in Valentia Harbour, County Kerry, Ireland. It is the site of a medieval monastic settlement, and includes the remains of a clochan, oratory, burial ground and two ancient shrines. The site is a National Monument in state care.

== Description ==
Church Island is located on a 1-acre (0.4 ha) island in Valentia Harbour, immediately west of Beginish, 1.4 km (0.87 mi) north of Knightstown. The island measures 70 m (230 ft) EW and 50 m (160 ft) NS. The remains of an oratory, clochan, stone crosses and slabs, and two ancient shrines are visible reminders of the medieval monastery. On the south-west shore is an inscribed ogham stone dating to 650-750 AD. It is inscribed with a Maltese cross, central circle and four smaller circles.

== History ==
The island was excavated from 1955 to 1956 by archaeologist, Michael J. O'Kelly. He suggested that there were two different phases of occupation on the island. The first phase was from the sixth to the seventh centuries. The earliest buildings were two wooden structures––a circular hut and another rectangular building. The rectangular building, found in the center of the island, was believed to be an oratory. The hut contained animal bones, charcoal and shell. Middens uncovered on the island revealed that the monks had a diet that included shellfish, cod, ballan wrasse, seal, fowl, and meat brought over from the mainland.

There was a second occupation on the island shortly after the first phase, probably during the 10th or 11th centuries. A burial ground with more than thirty graves was uncovered during excavation. Some burials were likely to be monks who had died on the island. In the second phase of occupation, a stone circular building, the clochan, and a stone oratory replaced the wooden structures. The stone oratory probably was built at a later date than the clochan and is made of Valentia slate. At least eight of the burials date to the later period of occupation. Also uncovered during excavation were two stone crosses, several cross slabs, one with an ogham inscription.

During a later excavation, in 2004, two shrines were discovered in the south part of the island. The first shrine measures 26 m (85 ft) and its surface is paved with Valentia slate and white quartz pebbles. It is thought to be a gable-shrine. The partial remains of four individuals were uncovered during excavation. The second shrine is trapezoid in shape and may have held human remains in the past.
