= Kilcoolaght East ogham stones =

Collection of ogham stones in County Kerry, Ireland

Kilcoolaght East Ogham Stones
- Clocha Oghaim Chill Chuallachta Thoir (Irish)
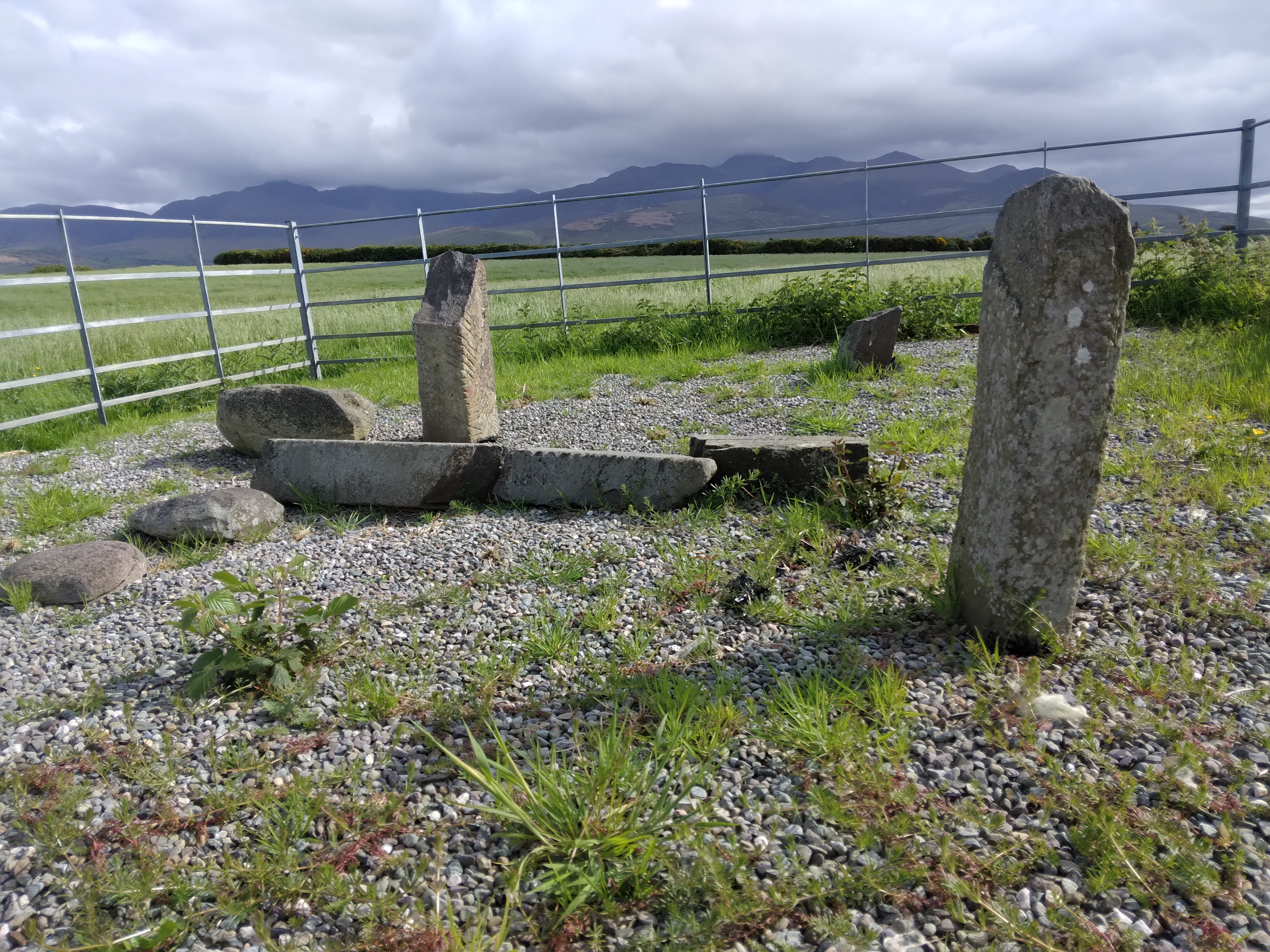
- The stones with MacGillycuddy's Reeks in the background

- Location within Ireland
- 52.073956°N 9.745798°W
- Type: ogham stones
- Location: Kilcoolaght East, Killorglin, County Kerry, Ireland

Site notes
- Elevation: 22 m (72 ft)
- Owner: state

National monument of Ireland
- Official name: Kilcoolaght East Ogham Stones
- Reference no.: 329

Kilcoolaght East Ogham Stones (CIIC 206–213) are a collection of ogham stones forming a National Monument located in County Kerry, Ireland.

== Location ==
Kilcoolaght East Ogham Stones are located 4.6 kilometres (2.9 mi) southeast of Killorglin, to the west of the Glasheenasheefree River.

== History ==
The stones were carved in the 5th and 6th centuries AD and served as burial markers. This was a ceallurach (burial ground).

All the stones were found in a souterrain nearby.

== Description ==
The stones are sandstone pillars.

- CIIC 206: [AN]M VIRR[ACC(?)]/ANNI TIGIR[N] ("name/inscription of Ferchán/Fírchán? of Tigern") and C̣/̣ṬẸDATTOQA MAQI/ VEDELMETṬ[O(?)] ("of Cétadach? son of Fedelmid/Feidlimid")
- CIIC 207: ẸCC MAQI L[UGUQ]ṚRIT ("of Éc? son of Luccreth")
- CIIC 208: UMALL
- CIIC 209: A]GGO MAQI AGỊ[LL ("...ggo son of Agi...")
- CIIC 210: DUBE[B and Q/N
- CIIC 211: [RI]TTẠVV[E]CC MAQ[I] V[E]DDONỌS ("of Rethach son of Feddonos"; this name survives in the Iveragh Peninsula)
- CIIC 212: highly fragmentary
- CIIC 213: URG̣

== Gallery ==
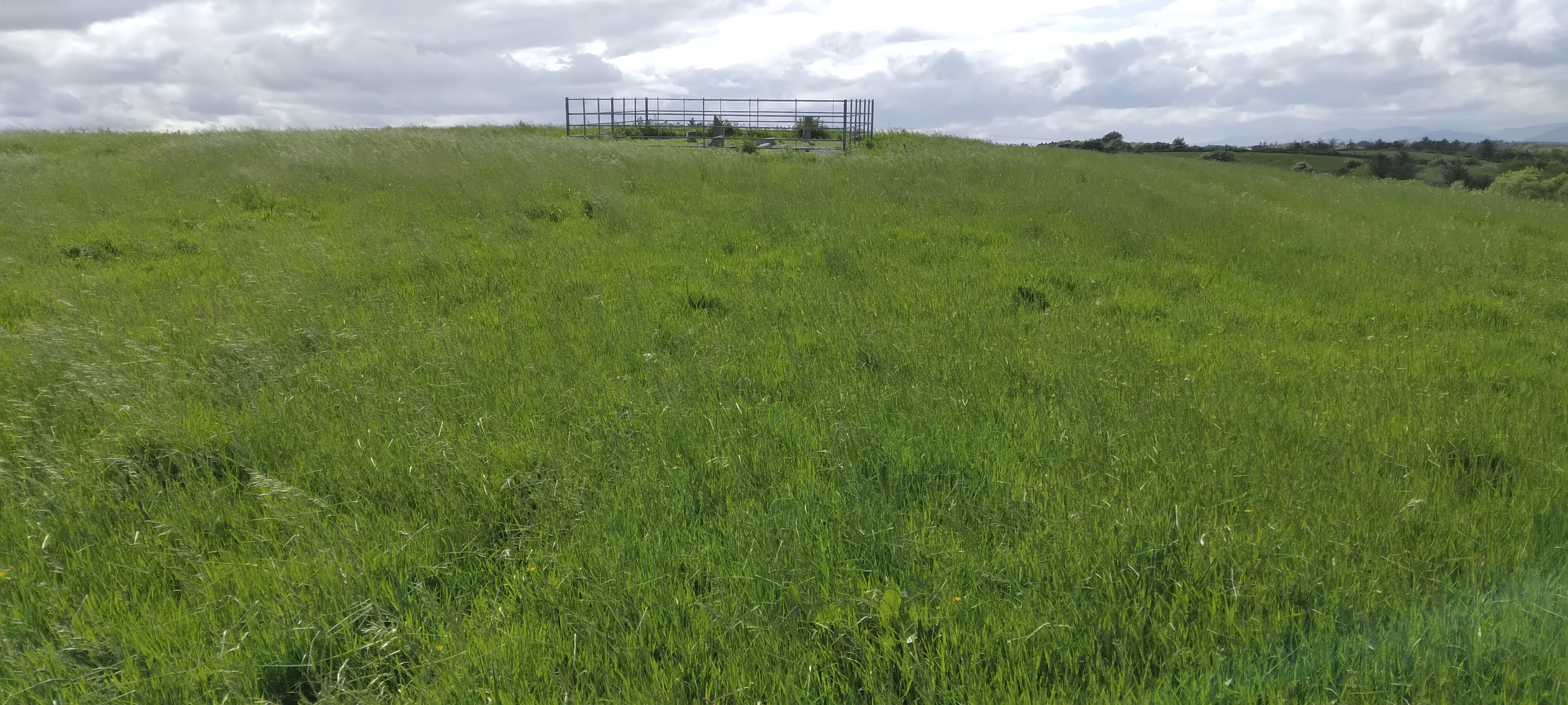
The enclosure as seen from afar

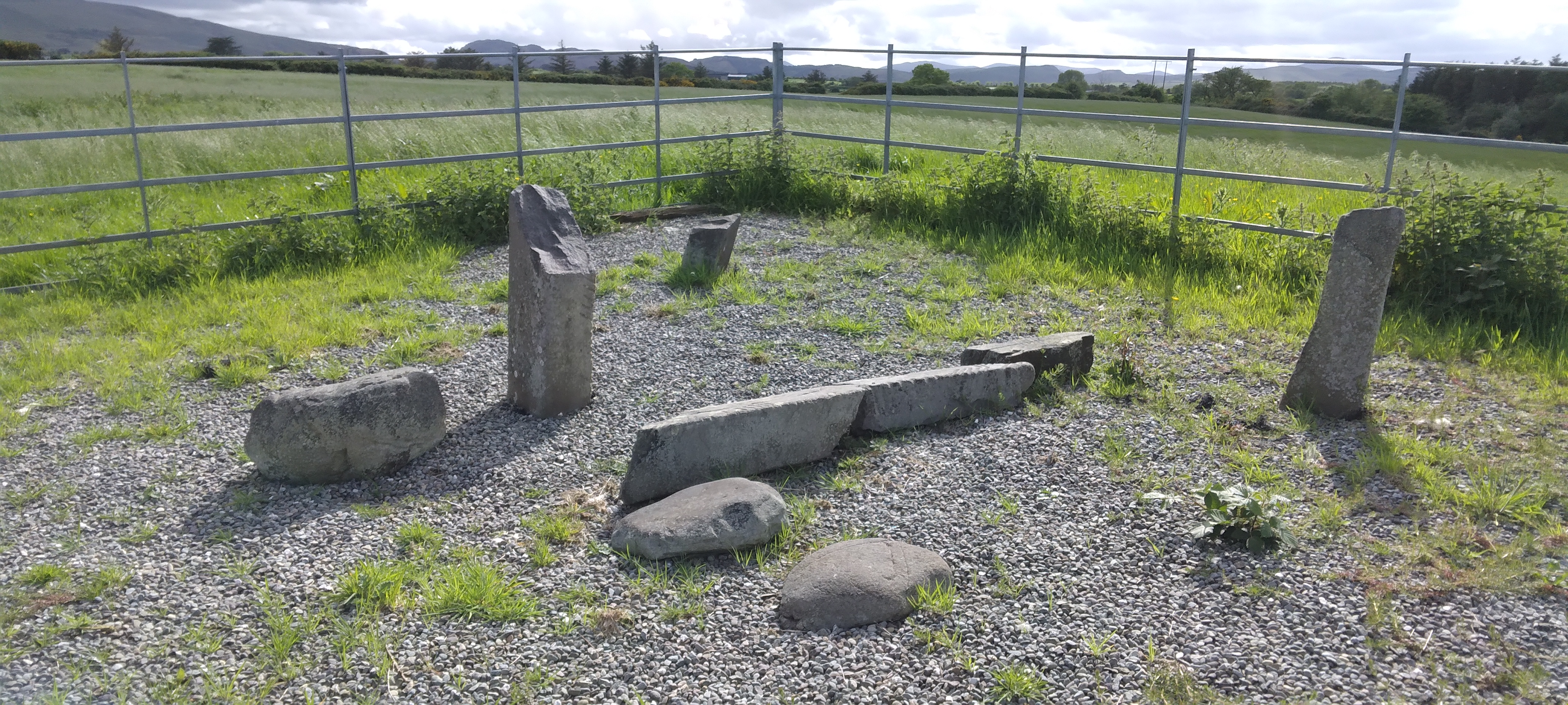
The stones in the enclosure

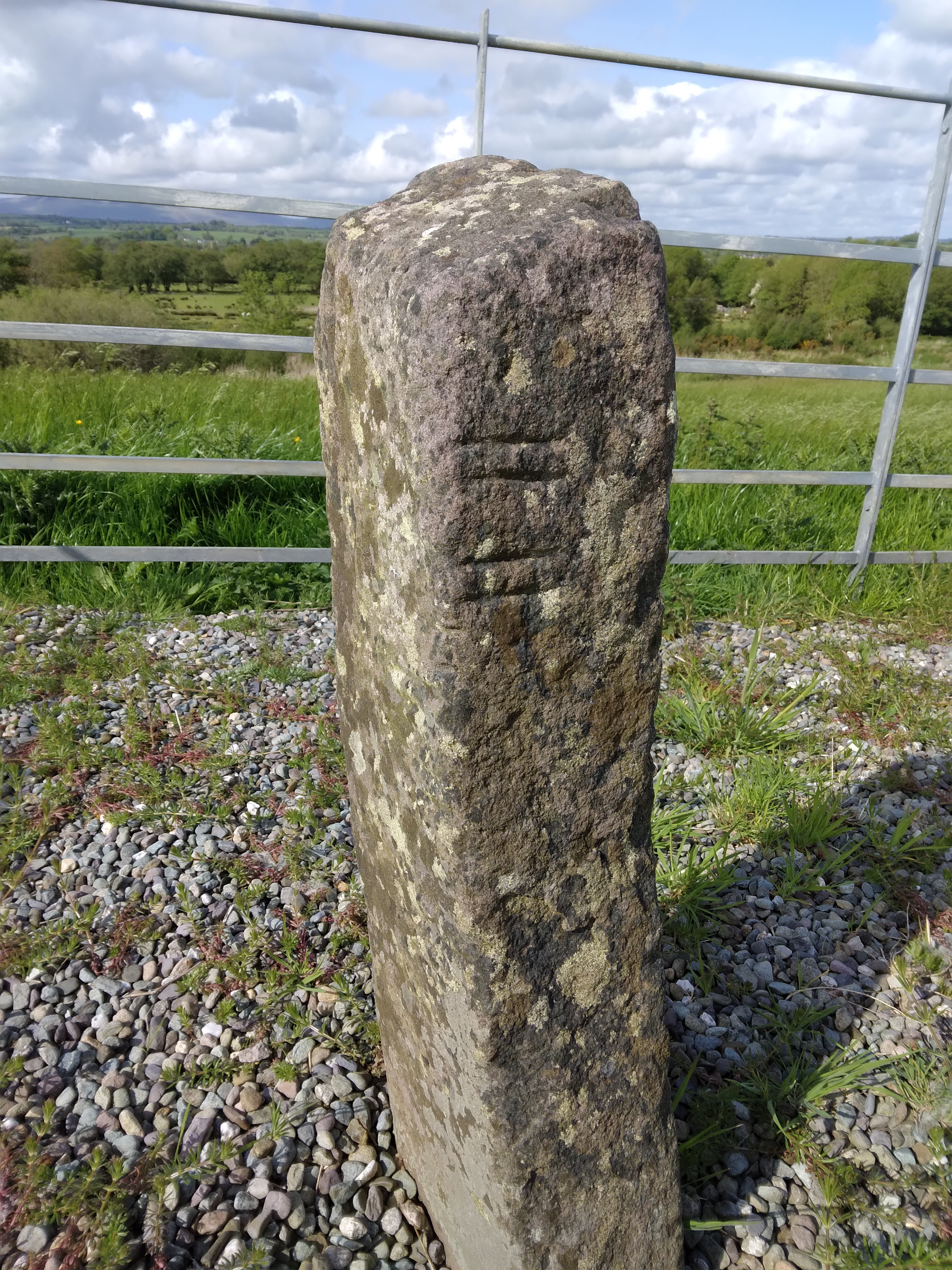
One of the pillars

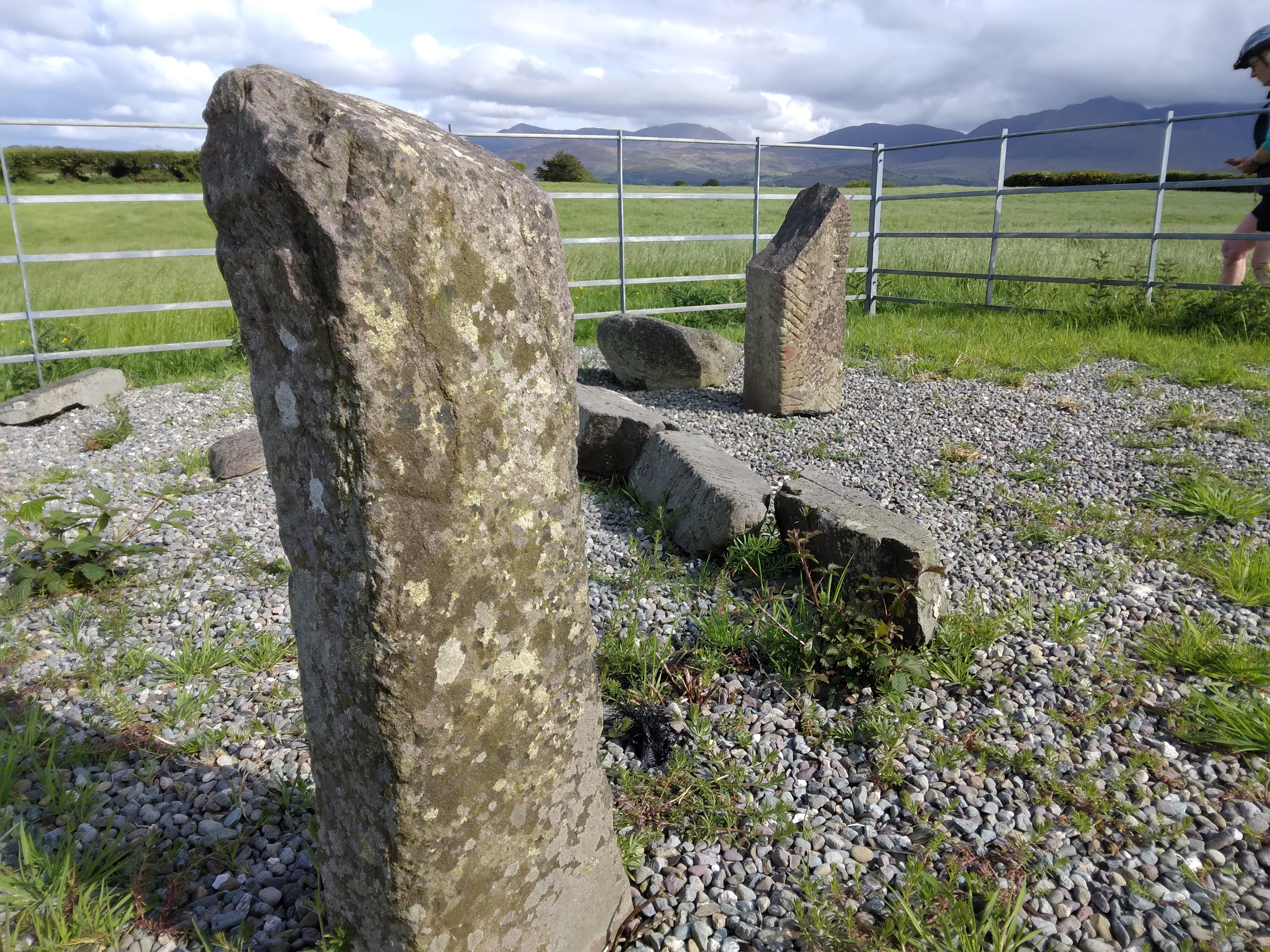
One of the pillars

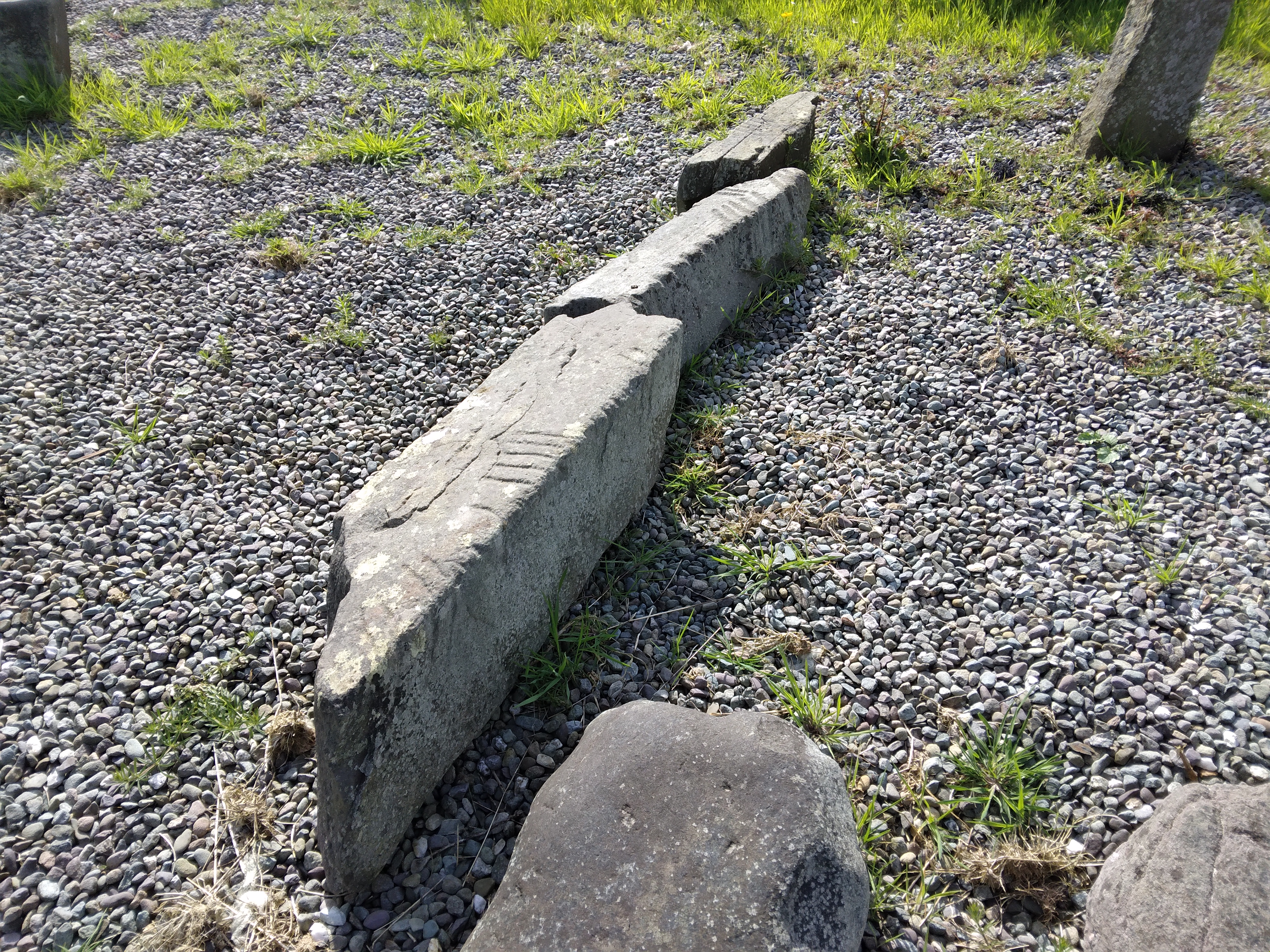
A collapsed and fragmented pillar

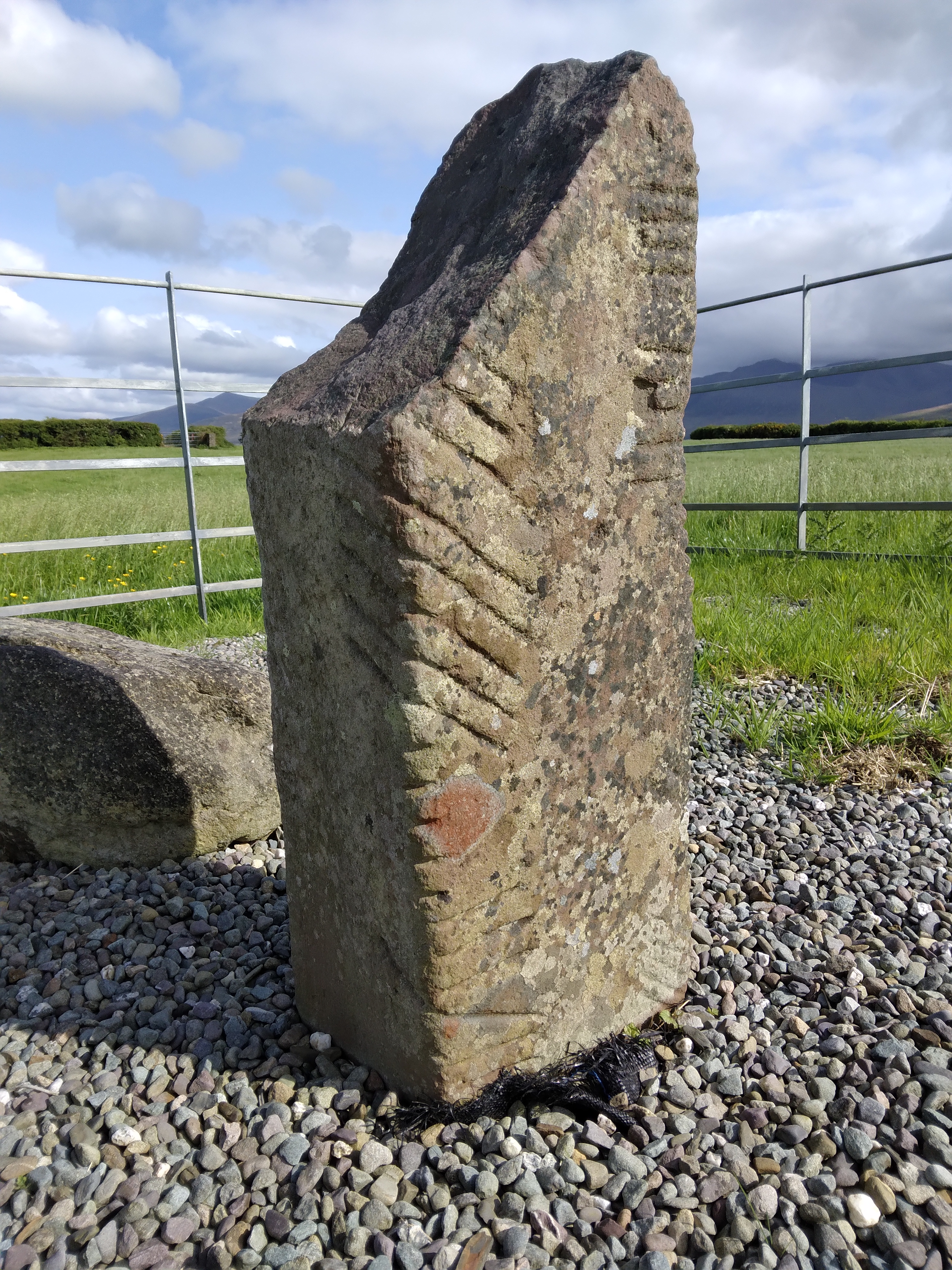
One of the pillars

== See also ==
- List of National Monuments in County Kerry
