= Beenbane =

Ancient site & National Monument in Ireland

- An Bhinn Bháin (Irish)
- Location within Ireland
- 51.831944°N 10.156944°W
- Etymology: "the white peak"
- Location: Beenbane
- Nearest city: Waterville

Site notes
- Owner: State

National monument of Ireland
- Official name: Beenbane
- Reference no.: 380 & 492

Beenbane is an ancient site and National Monument located in County Kerry, Ireland.

Beenbane is located on the Iveragh Peninsula, to the west of Lough Currane.

Beenbane contains a calluragh, hut sites, cross slab, enclosure, souterrain, cross, boulder burial and standing stones.
