= Tullygarran ogham stones =

National Monument in County Kerry, Ireland

- Clocha Oghaim Tulaigh Garráin (Irish)
- Chute Hall Ogham Stones
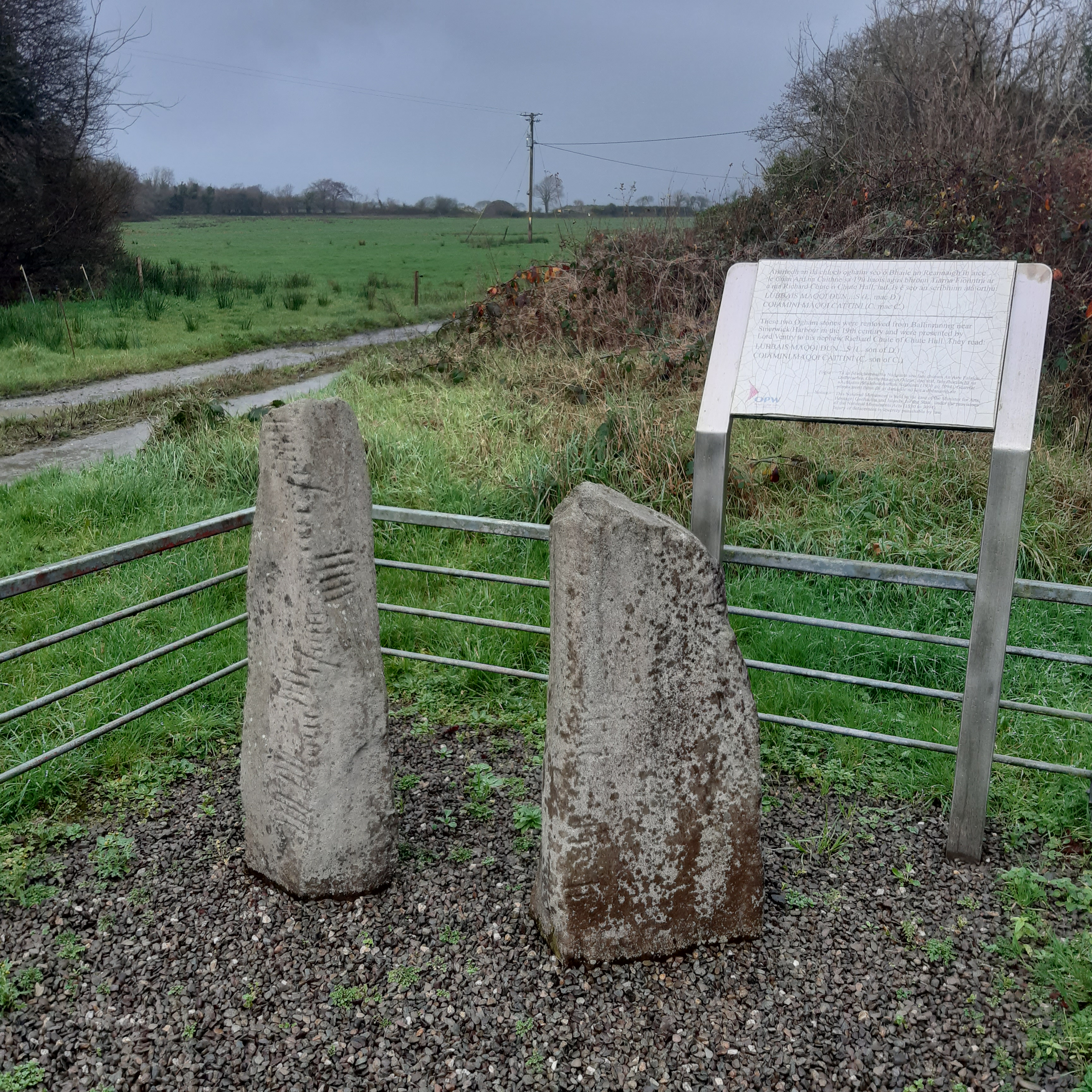
- The stones in 2025

- Location within Ireland
- 52.275836°N 9.643068°W
- Type: ogham stones
- Location: Tullygarran, Tralee, County Kerry, Ireland

History
- Built: c. AD 300–800

Site notes
- Owner: private

National monument of Ireland
- Official name: Tullygarran Ogham Stones
- Reference no.: 295

The Tullygarran ogham stones are a pair of ogham stones forming a National Monument located in County Kerry, Ireland.

== Location ==
Tullygarran Ogham Stones are located 4.2 kilometres (2.6 mi) east of Tralee, near to Chute Hall.

== History ==
The stones were discovered in 1848 after a storm uncovered an ancient burial ground overlooking Smerwick Bay. Dayrolles Eveleigh-de-Moleyns, 4th Baron Ventry moved them to his home at Chute Hall.

== Description ==
The stones are:

- Stone 1: reads LUBBAIS MAQQI DUN....S ("of Lubbais son of Dun...s") and stands 0.96 metres (3 ft 2 in) tall
- Stone 2: reads CCICAMINI MAQQ(I) C(A)TTINI ("of Cíchmuine son of Caitne") and stands 1.02 metres (3 ft 4 in) tall
