= Garfinny Church =

- Teampall na Gairfeanaí
- Location within Ireland
- 52.147965°N 10.2342°W
- Location: Garfinny, Dingle, County Kerry
- Country: Ireland
- Denomination: Catholic (pre-Reformation)

Architecture
- Functional status: ruined

Specifications
- Materials: greenschist, clay

Administration
- Diocese: Ardfert and Aghadoe
Designations
National monument of Ireland
- Official name: Garfinny Cemetery
- Reference no.: 64

Garfinny Church is a medieval church and National Monument in County Kerry, Ireland.

== Location ==
Garfinny Church is located in an ancient graveyard, with an area of 0.776 ha (1.92 acres). It lies 2.3 km (1.4 mi) east-northeast of Dingle.

== Description ==
Of the ancient church only the east gable survives; about 3.7 m (12 ft) tall and made of greenschist.

One stone in the graveyard bears the inscription: Here lie Maurice Kennedy and his wife Judith Carrane, James Kennedy and his wife Alice Moriarty Achillon - said Maurice and James were the sons of John, son of Maurice, son of John Kennedy, who in the days of Cromwell left Nenagh in Ormond and settled in the Parish of Garfinach. This stone is consecrated to their memory by Jos. Kennedy, M.D., and the Revd. James Kennedy, P.P. of Dingle, sons of the said James, A.D. 1816. This illustrates the transfer of the O'Kennedys, among many other Irish clans and people, from Munster to Kerry during the Cromwellian land confiscations.
