= Ballynavenooragh =

- Baile na bhFionnúrach (Irish)
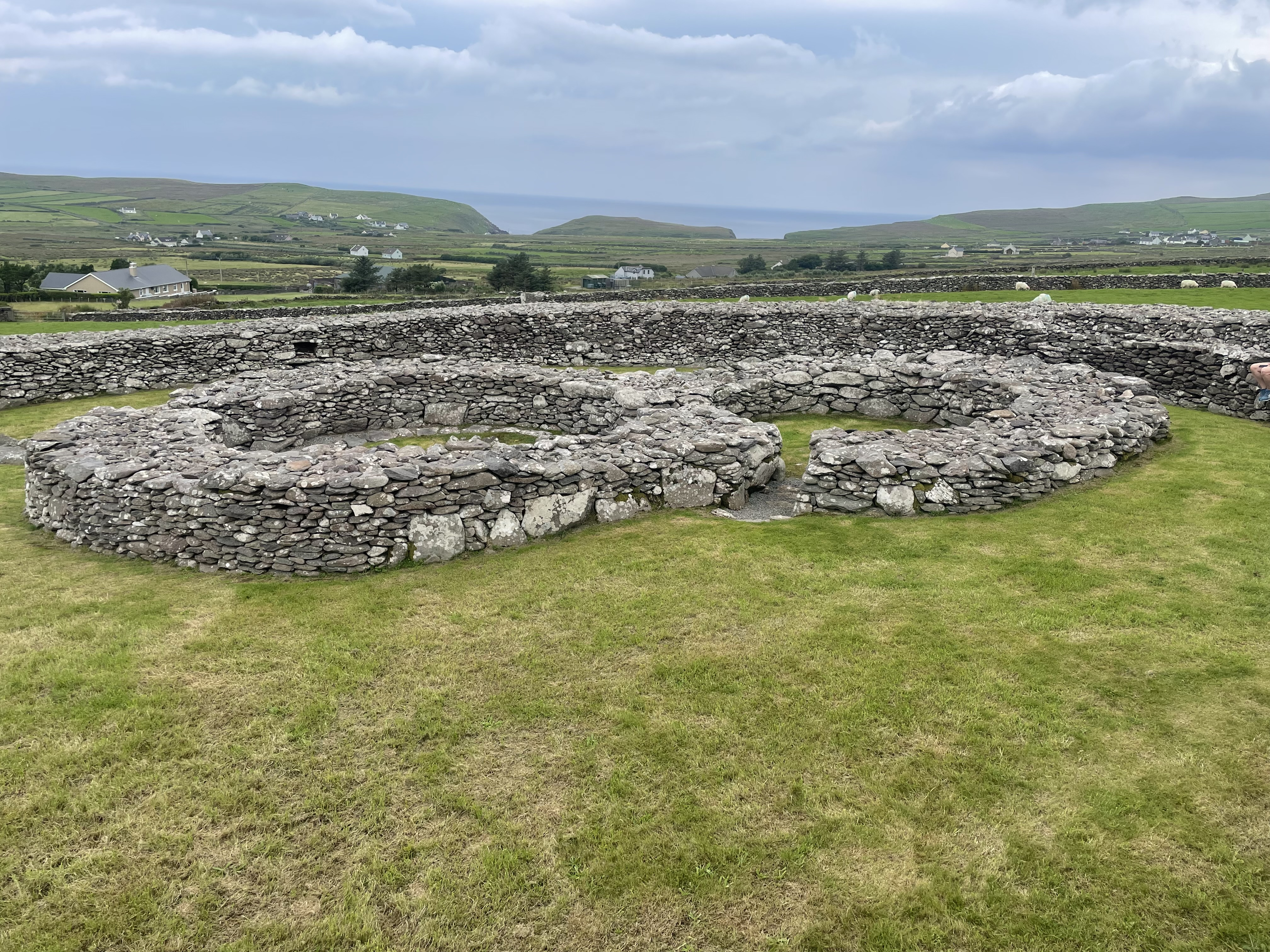
- The monument in August 2025

- Location within Ireland
- 52.226155°N 10.297978°W
- Type: stone ringfort with clocháns and souterrain
- Etymology: Irish: "settlement of the white hills"
- Location: Ballynavenooragh, Dingle Peninsula, County Kerry

History
- Built: 7th–10th centuries AD

Site notes
- Owner: state

National monument of Ireland
- Official name: Cathair na BhFionnúrach Stone fort, huts & souterrain; Ballynavenooragh Stone fort & hut
- Reference no.: 221.0712

Ballynavenooragh (/ˌbælɪnəmˈjuːrə(x)/) (Irish: Cathair na bhFionnúrach) is a stone fort and National Monument located in County Kerry, Ireland.

== Location ==
Ballynavenooragh lies on the Dingle Peninsula, 10 km (6.2 mi) north of Dingle town, on the western slopes of Mount Brandon. The broader Ballynavenooragh group comprises 40 ringforts, 24 clocháns and 2 cillíní.

== History ==
This cashel (stone fort, 27 metres (89 ft) internal diameter) was in use in the 7th–10th centuries, with later reuse in the 13th century. It is similar to the cashel at Leacanabuaile.

It was excavated by Erin Gibbons in the late 1990s. A pit containing organic remains was found — apple, blackberry, hazelnut and grape seeds. Also found were stone tools, pottery, iron knives, a blue glass bead, crucible fragments, two 13th-century coins (silver pennies of Henry III) and two lathe-turned objects. Alder and willow were used for posts, apparently due to a lack of oak in the region.

== Structures ==
The cashel contains two clocháns, a fireplace, souterrain and several postholes, and stepped terracing. The gateposts are formed by upright slabs. An oblong chamber in the souterrain is 5.5 metres (18 ft) long.

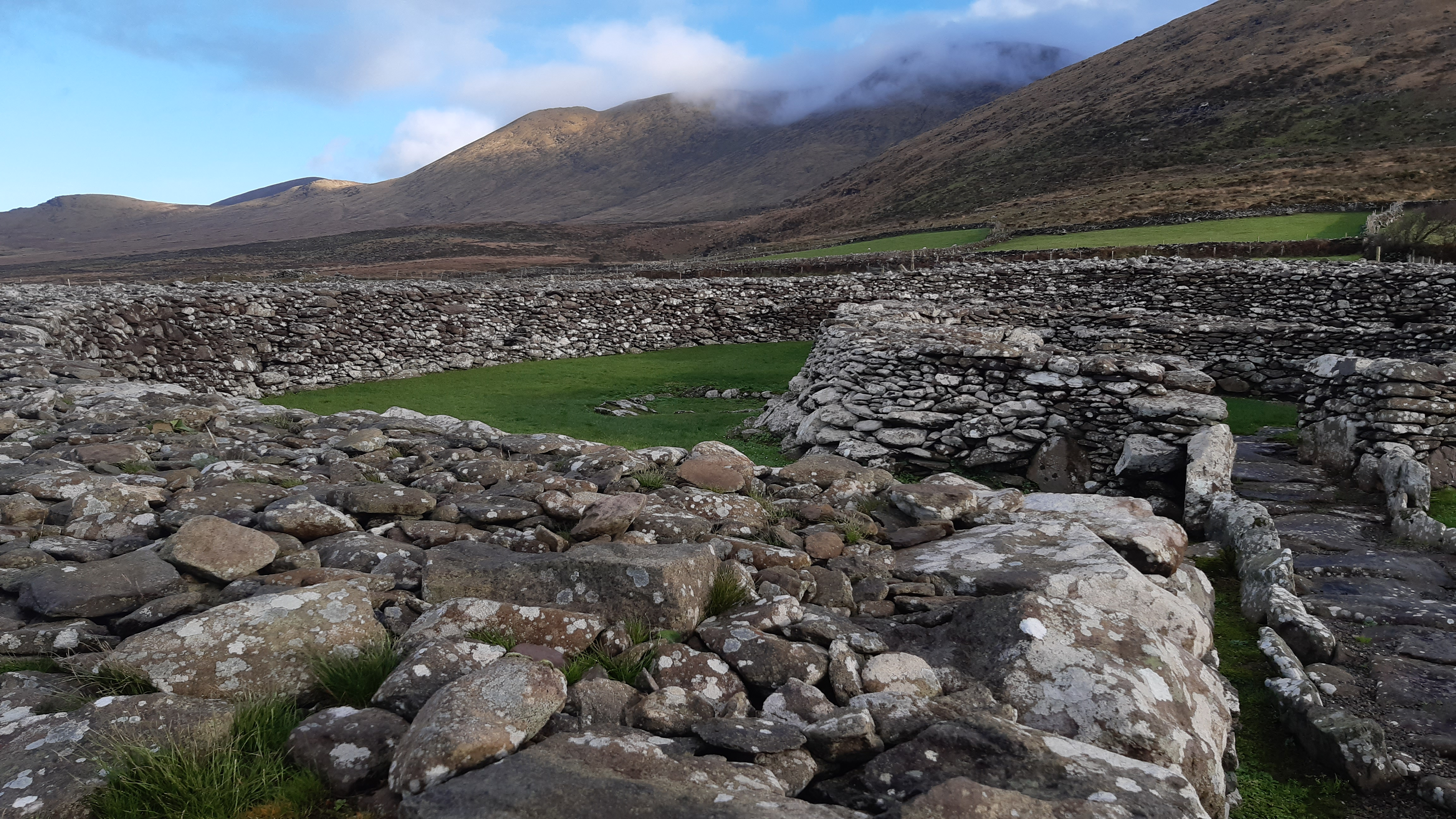
The entrance to the fort, with Mount Brandon visible at rear
