= Maumanorig =

Remains of medieval monastery, County Kerry, Ireland

Maumanorig · Kilcolman
- Mám an Óraigh · Cill na gColmán
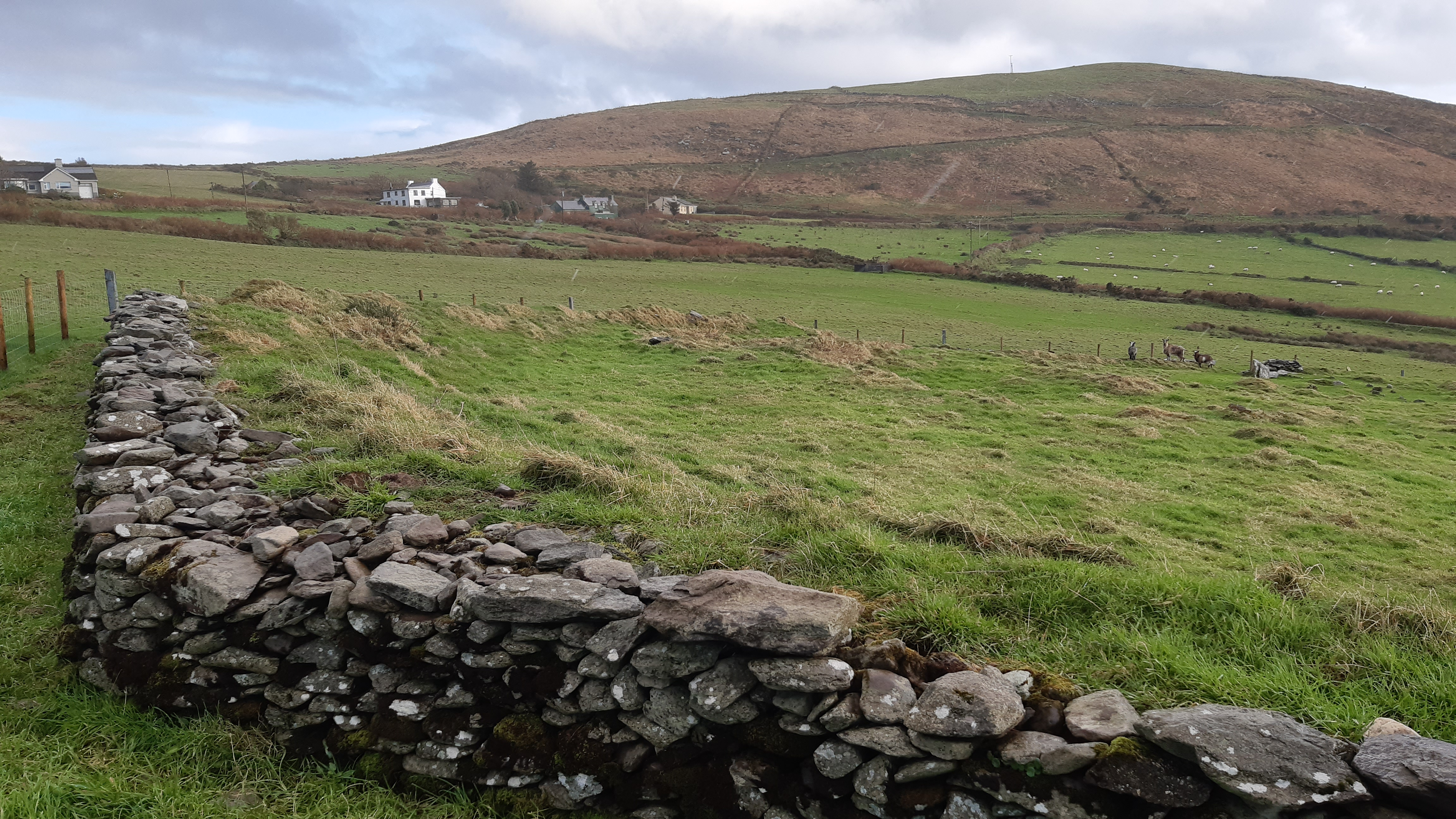
- The enclosure in 2025

- Location within Ireland
- Interactive map of Maumanorig · Kilcolman

Monastery information
- Established: 6th century AD
- Diocese: Ardfert and Aghadoe

Architecture
- Status: ruined
- Style: Celtic

Site
- Location: Maumanorig, Ventry, County Kerry
- Coordinates: 52.143812°N 10.358648°W
- Public access: yes

Maumanorig or Kilcolman is the site of the remains of a medieval Christian monastery and National Monument located on the Dingle Peninsula, County Kerry, Ireland.

== Location ==
Maumanorig is located 1.2 km (3/4 mile) north of Ventry on a site of 0.184 ha (0.45 acres).

The placename is Irish for "hill-top of the yellow stones" or "mountain pass of the Hoares." It may have been a starting-point for pilgrims to Skellig Michael or Mount Brandon.

== Description ==
Maumanorig is a circular enclosure within which are a church site, two hut-sites and several gravemarkers.

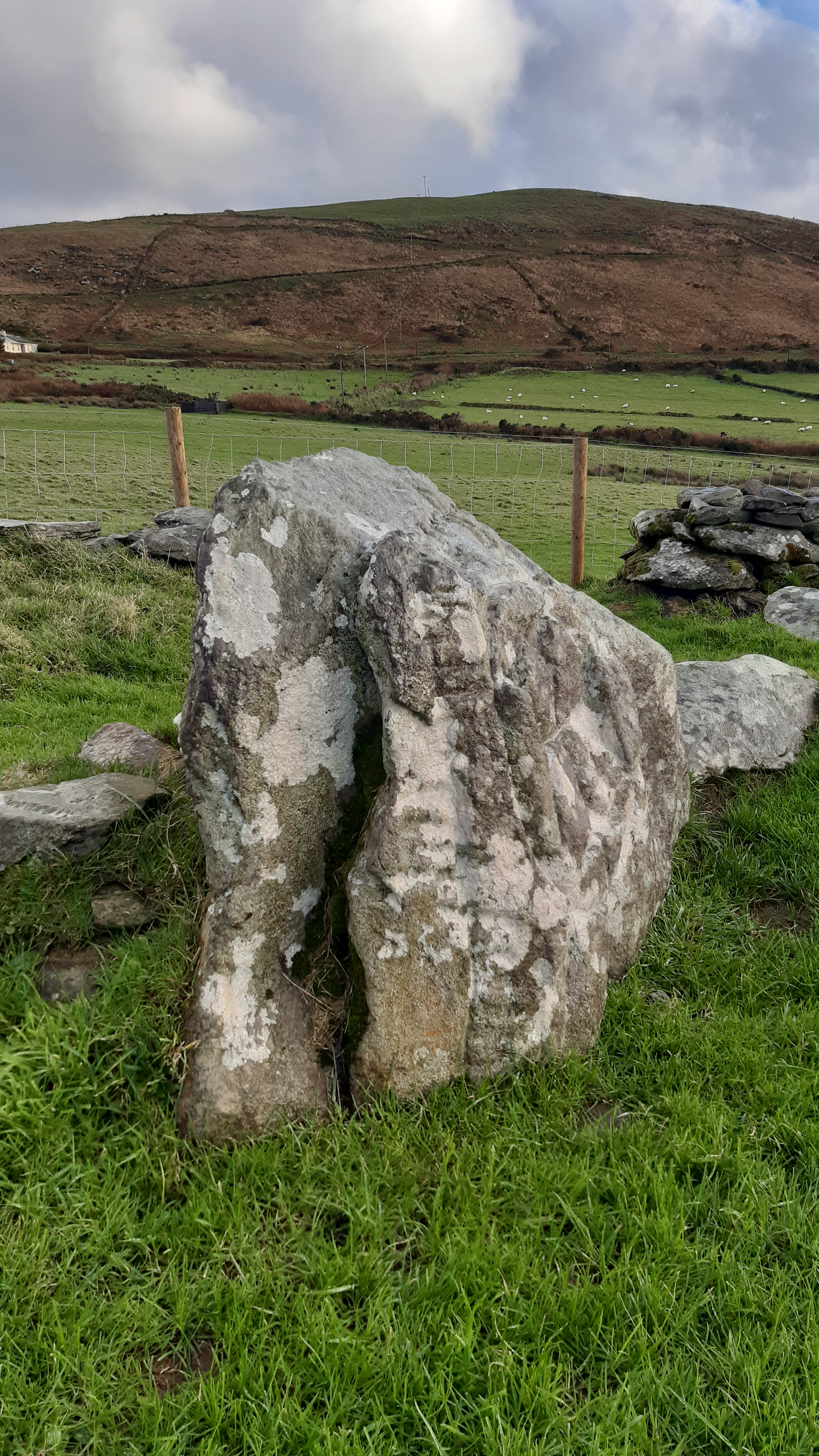
The west face of the ogham stone within the complex

There is a cross pattee-inscribed ogham stone, 115 cm (3 ft 9 in) tall and 158 metres (518 feet) long. The west face bears the Ogham inscription and two crosses. The Ogham (CIIC 193) reads ᚛ᚐᚅᚋ ᚉᚑᚂᚋᚐᚅ ᚐᚔᚂᚔᚈᚆᚔᚏ᚜ ANM COL(OLṬḤ)ṂẠṆ ẠḶỊṬḤIR meaning "[written in] the name of Colmán, the pilgrim."

It may commemorate Colmán Oilither, grandson of Díarmait mac Fergosa Cerrbéoil, who died c. AD 565–572.

Also there is a small cross-inscribed stone, a holed stone and three bullaun stones.
