= Ballybowler North Ogham Stone =

National monument in County Kerry, Ireland

- Cloch Oghaim Bhaile an Bhúlaeraigh Thuaidh (Irish)
- Location within Ireland
- 52.176767°N 10.222615°W
- Type: ogham stone
- Location: Ballybowler North, Conor Pass, County Kerry, Ireland

History
- Built: c. 300–600 AD

Site notes
- Elevation: 279 m (915 ft)
- Owner: Office of Public Works

National monument of Ireland
- Official name: Ballybowler North
- Reference no.: 221

The Ballybowler North Ogham Stone is an ogham stone and a National Monument located in County Kerry, Ireland.

== Location ==
Ballybowler North Ogham Stone is located near to the Conor Pass.

== History ==
This stone was erected as a grave marker, with inscription in Primitive Irish, some time in the early medieval period. On the Record of Monuments and Places it bears the code KE043-108.
