= Caherdorgan North =

Stone ringfort and medieval house in County Kerry, Ireland

- Cathair Deargáin Thuaidh (Irish)
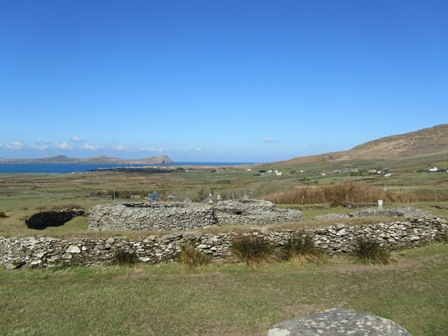
- View of the fort

- Location within Ireland
- 52.179256°N 10.339466°W
- Type: stone ringfort and medieval house
- Etymology: Doregan's stone fort
- Location: Dingle Peninsula County Kerry

History
- Built: 8th or 9th century AD

Site notes
- Elevation: 66 m (217 ft)
- Owner: state

National monument of Ireland
- Official name: Caherdorgan North Cashel / The Chancellor's House
- Reference no.: 221.4748

Caherdorgan North is a National Monument located in County Kerry, Ireland.

== Location ==
Caherdorgan North's cashel lies on the slope overlooking Smerwick Harbour, 6.6 km (4.1 mi) northwest of Dingle. The Chancellor's House is 300 m (330 yd) to the north.

== Caherdorgan Cashel ==
The cashel has a circular wall, within which are 5 dry stone clocháns with corbelled roofs. A souterrain was once here.

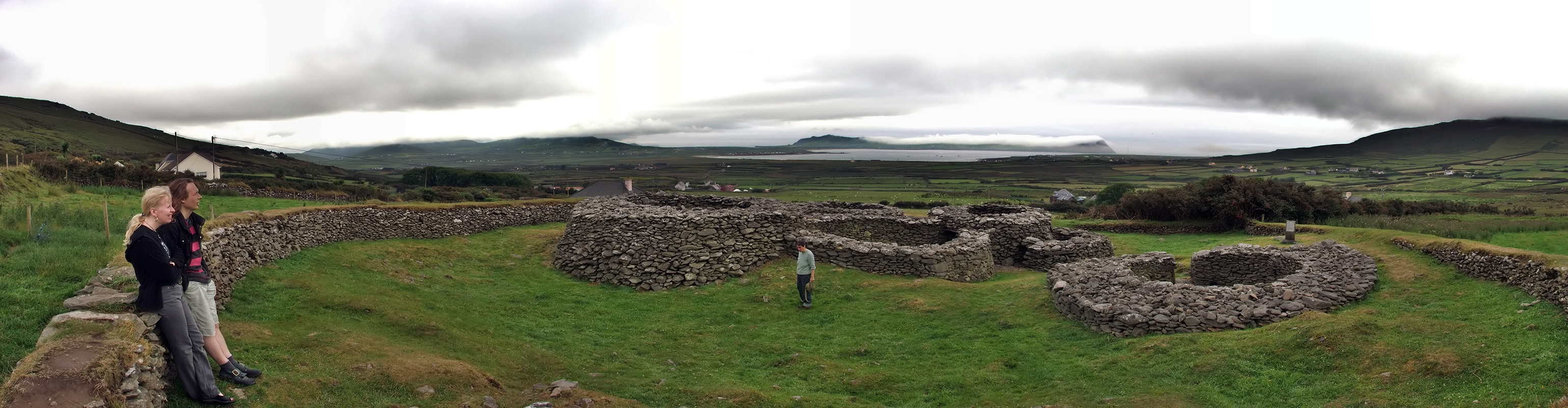
Panorama of the interior

== The Chancellor's House ==
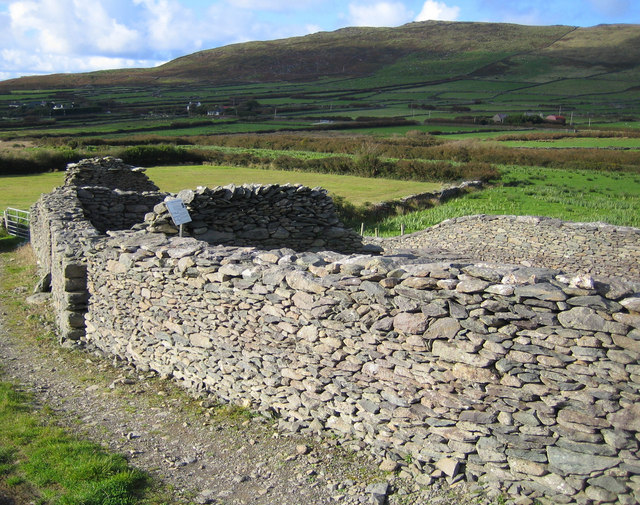
View of a wall of the Chancellor's House

The Chancellor's House (Fothrach an tSainsiléara) is a ruined rectangular stone medieval building. It was probably home to the chancellor (cancellarius) of the Diocese of Ardfert and Aghadoe. The house is 17.6 m (58 ft) long and contains a bread oven and fireplace.
