= Annagh Church =

Medieval ruined church near Tralee, Ireland

- Teampall Eanaigh
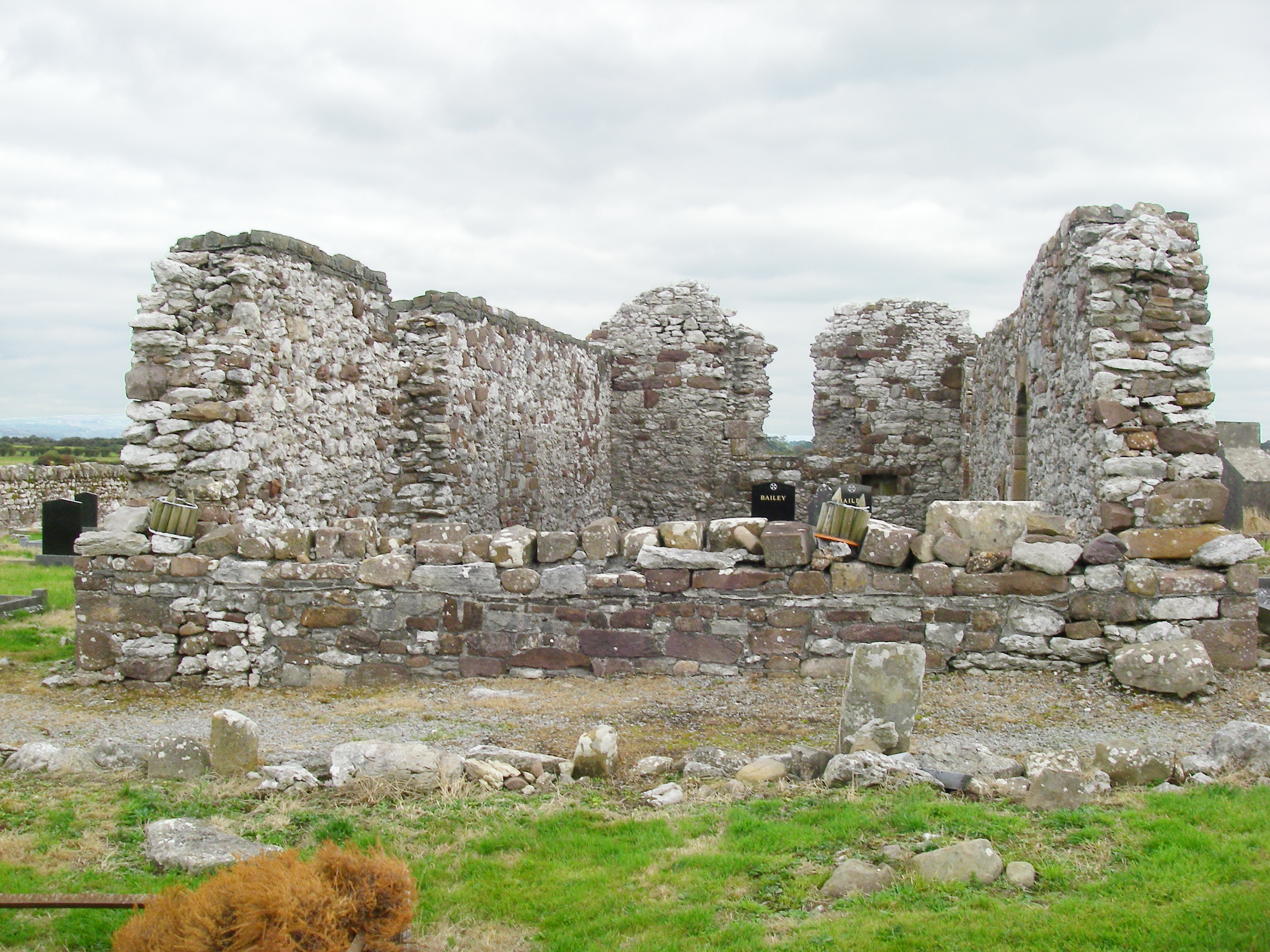
- Annagh Church looking east

- Location within Ireland
- 52.248452°N 9.754696°W
- Location: Annagh, Tralee, County Kerry
- Country: Ireland
- Denomination: Catholic (pre-Reformation)

Architecture
- Functional status: Ruined
- Style: Anglo-Norman
- Years built: Between 12th-15th centuries AD

Administration
- Diocese: Ardfert and Aghadoe

National monument of Ireland
- Official name: Annagh
- Reference no.: 56

Annagh Church is a ruined medieval church and National Monument located near Tralee, County Kerry, Ireland. The church was built between the 12th and 15th centuries. On the interior south wall of the church is a small, crudely carved sandstone sculpture of a man on a horse holding a weapon. The church is surrounded by a walled cemetery with older and modern gravestones. There are several ancient sites nearby, including a ringfort and standing stones.

== Description ==
=== The church ===
The Annagh church is located 3.6 km (2.2 mi) southwest of Tralee, County Kerry, Ireland. The roofless, ruined structure is located at the north end of its old burial ground. It has a plain, rectangular design, measuring 14 m (46 ft) by 5.5 m (18 ft) and is in a good state of preservation. It was originally built with local rubble sandstone and limestone, with no evidence that lime mortar was used. The sandstone was also used in a surviving, small stone carving on the interior south wall. Repairs to the walls of the church were done in the early 20th century. The church interior, laid with gravel contains several older and modern graves.

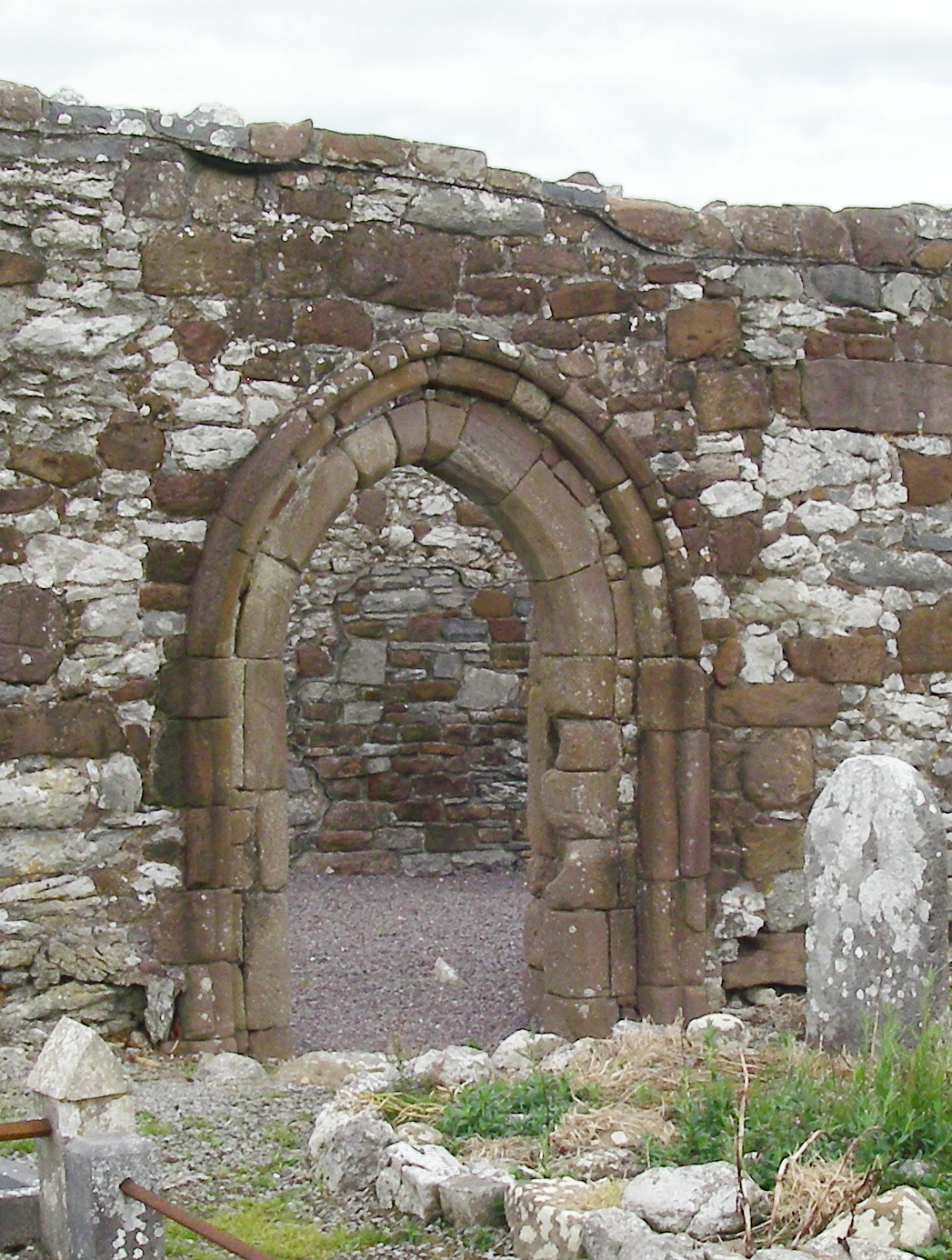
3-Point arched doorway on south wall

The eastern gable's wall has been reduced over time to the height of the side walls and is lit by a single window. The western gable was reconstructed in the 20th century and now stands at less than 1 km (0.62 mi) in height. There is one window on the western wall. The northern wall survives to its full height although. It has a large gap and the western end of the northern wall has been reduced in size. There is no window on the north wall.

The south wall stands at nearly full height and has one single window opening. The entrance doorway on the wall has a well-preserved 3-point arched doorway and is surrounded by a rare Anglo-Norman style drip-moulding. Inside the doorway entrance is a holy-water stoup scooped out of one of the wall stones. On the interior wall next to the doorway is a sandstone carving of a mounted knight.

=== Sandstone carving ===
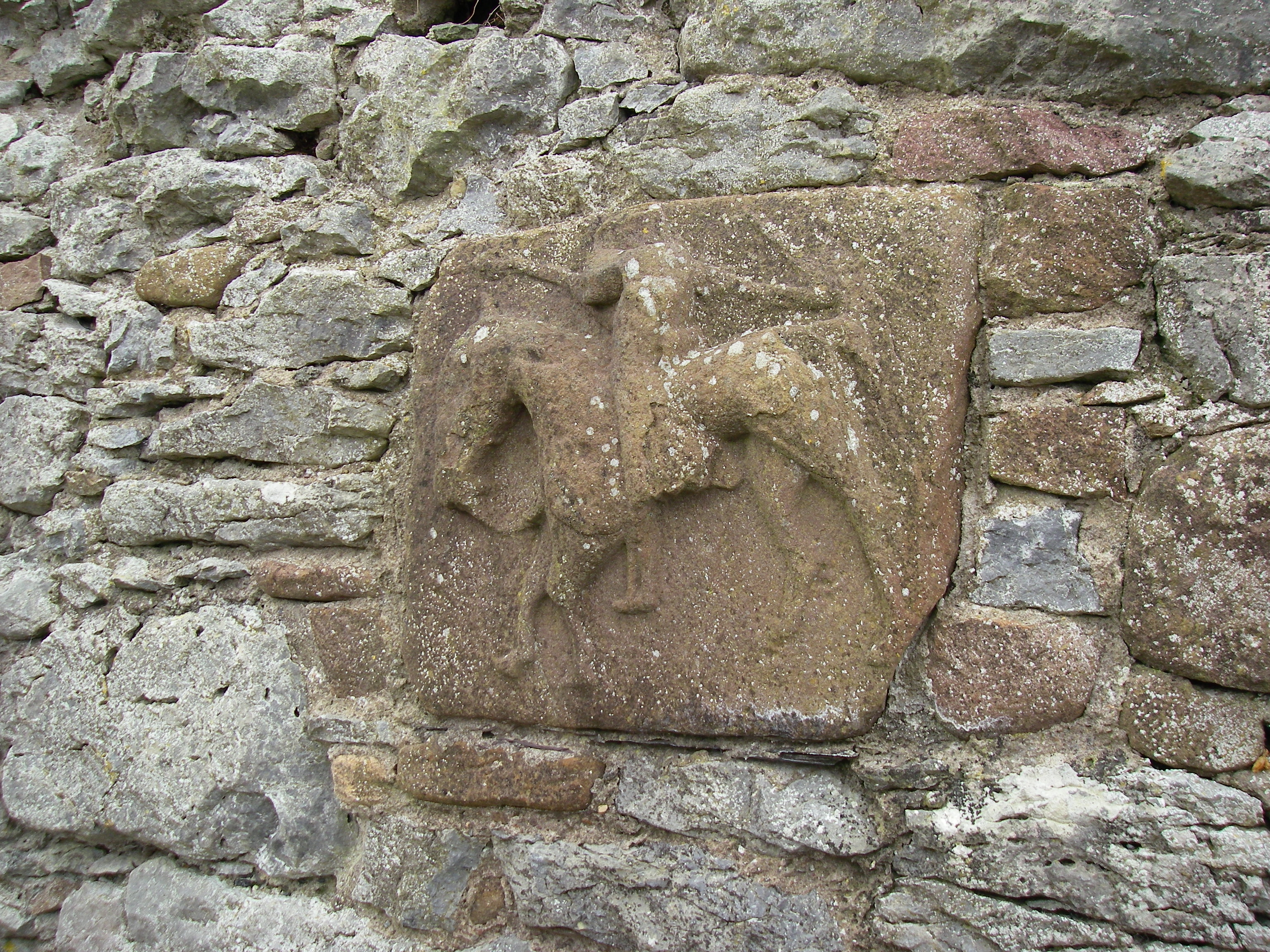
Sandstone carving

On the south interior wall of the church, next to the doorway, is a small sandstone, carved in relief which has been built into the wall. The rough image is of a man on horseback holding a weapon in his right hand. It measures 460 mm (18 in) x 410 mm (16 in), and is 180 mm (7.1 in) thick. The head and left shoulder of the knight are missing. The carving may date to the 14th century and would have been carved into the wall of the church when it was built.

== History ==
The church was built sometime between the 12th and the 15th century. There are many ancient sites in the area: Tonakilla Fort, a ringfort and standing stones. A 19th century survey of the church suggests that the Annagh church had been abandoned and in ruins by 1756. Approximately a half-mile away in the village of Blennerville, a new church was built in 1818 to replace the abandoned church. In 1877 the Blennerville parish was combined with the Tralee parish. The new church was named St Anna's, adopting the old placename 'Annagh' with a similar sounding saint's name.

== Gallery ==
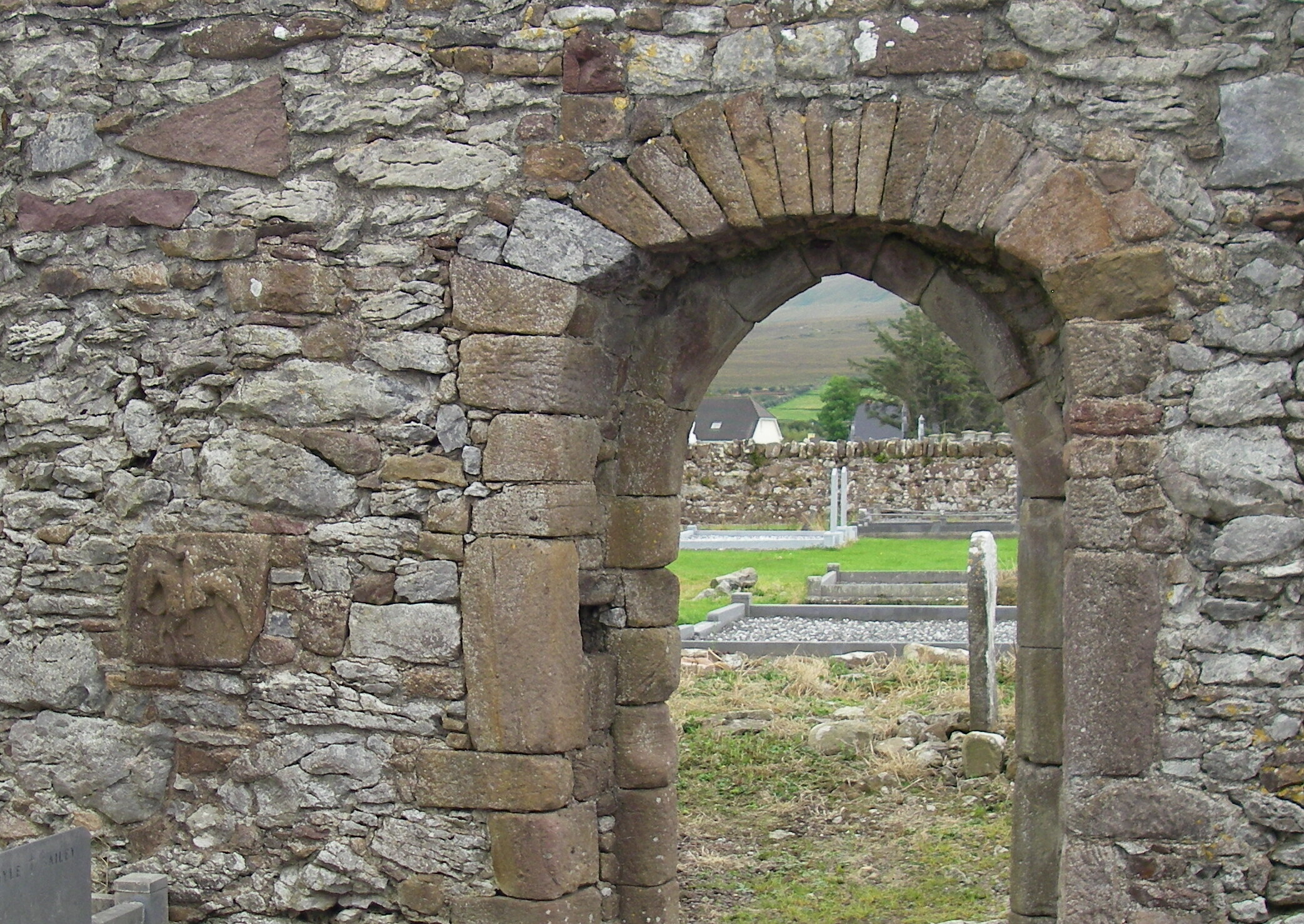
Interior view South doorway

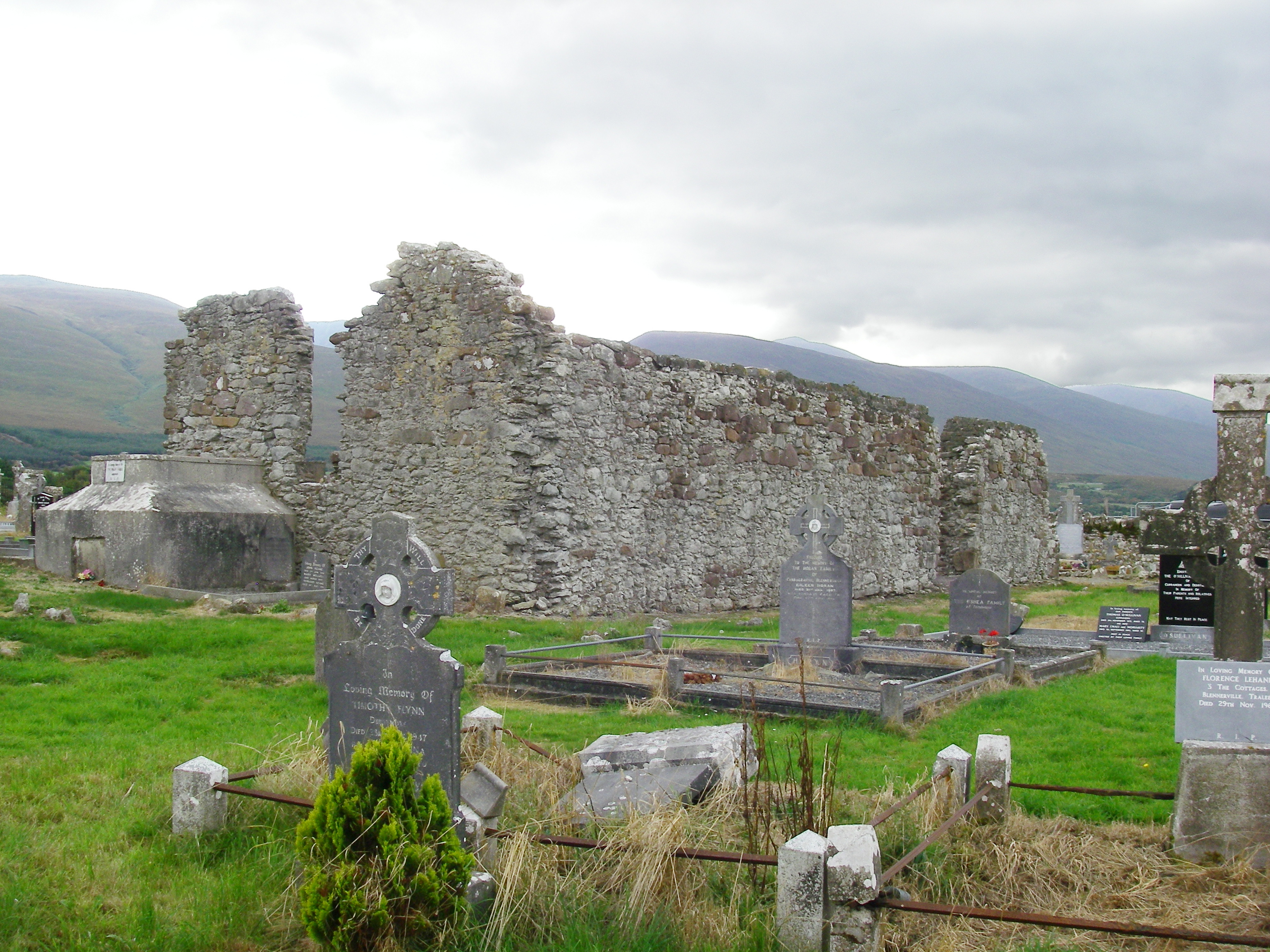
Southwest view

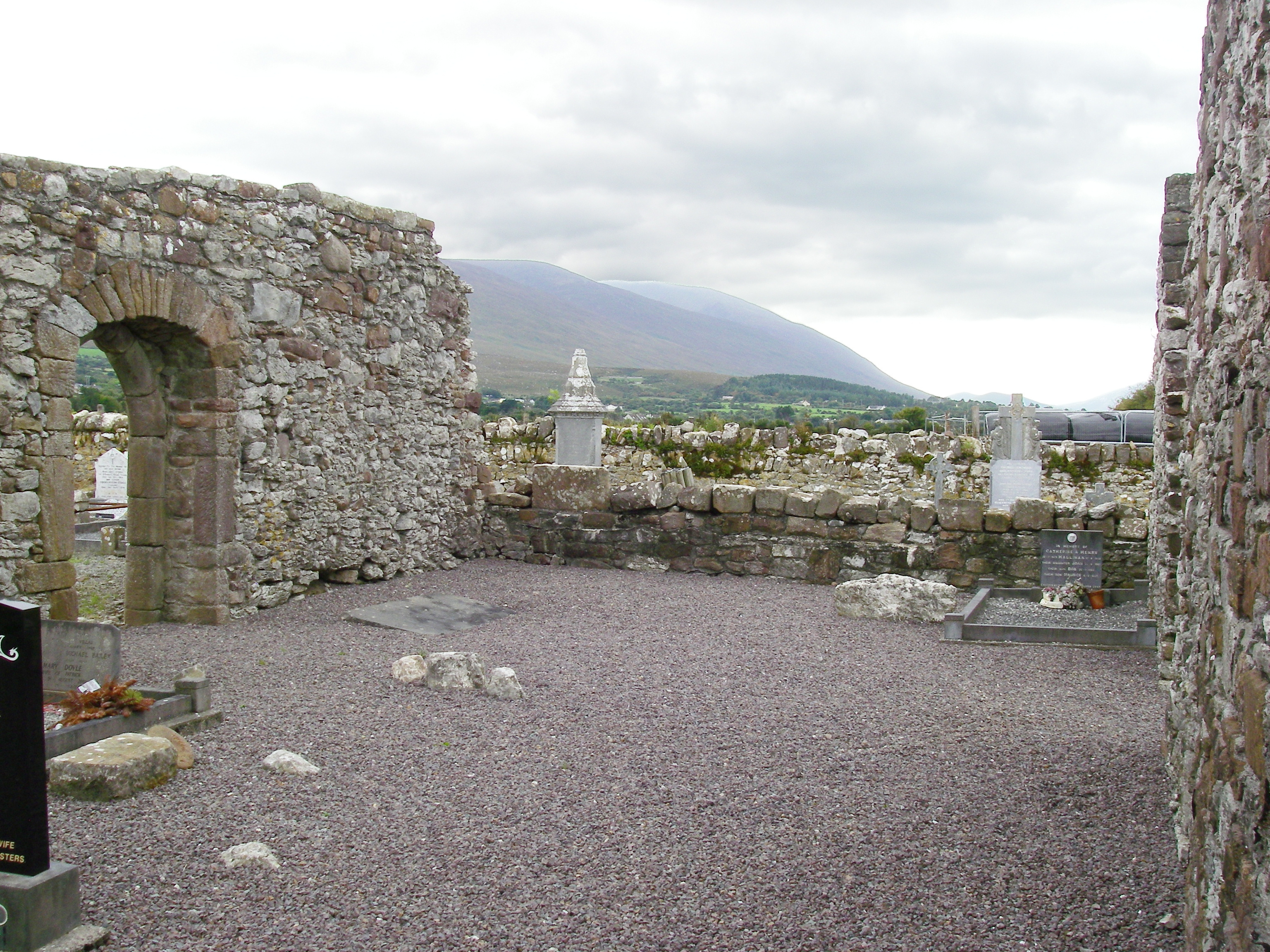
View of west wall

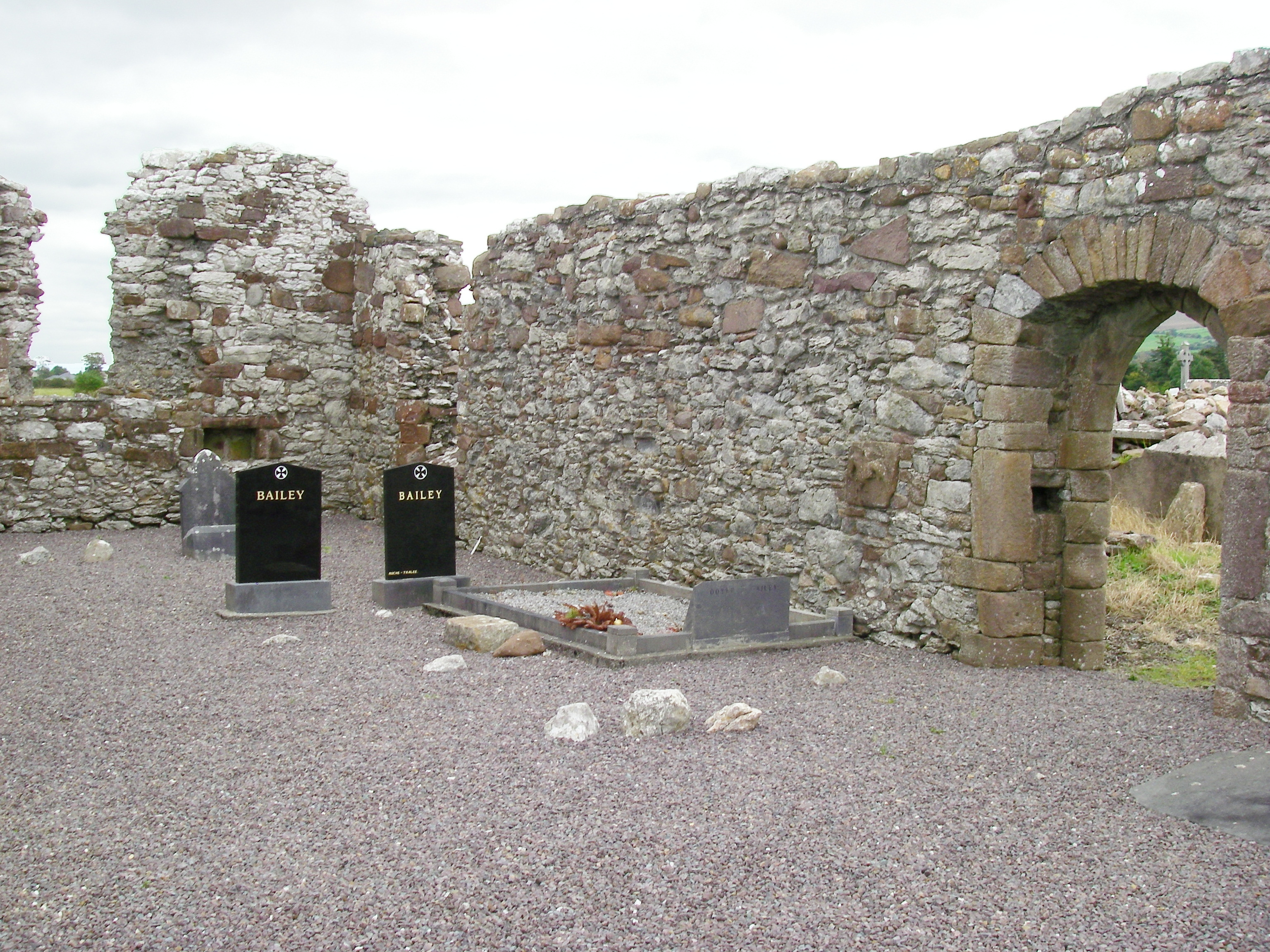
Southeast view
