= Arraglen Ogham Stone =

Ogham stone in County Kerry, Ireland

- Cloch Oghaim Airghleanna (Irish)
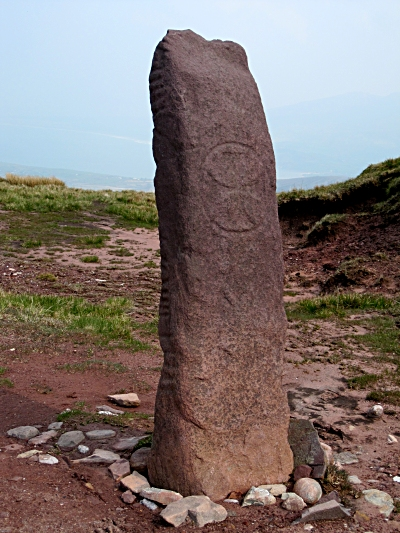

- Location within Ireland
- 52.2589°N 10.249°W
- Type: ogham stone
- Location: Arraglen, Brandon, County Kerry, Ireland

History
- Built: c. 550–600 AD

Site notes
- Elevation: 669 m (2,195 ft)
- Height: 1.91 m (6 ft 3 in)
- Owner: Office of Public Works

National monument of Ireland
- Official name: Arraglen
- Reference no.: 221

The Arraglen Ogham Stone is an ogham stone (CIIC 145) and a National Monument located in County Kerry, Ireland.

== Location ==
Arraglen ogham stone is located in a saddle between Mount Brandon and Masatiompan.

== History ==
This stone was erected as a grave marker, with inscription in Primitive Irish, some time in c. AD 550–600.

== Description ==
The stone is sandstone, 191 × 38 × 20 cm. The inscription reads QRIMITIR RO/Ṇ[A]/ṆN MAQ̣ COMOGANN ("of the priest [cruimther] Rónán son of Comgán"). It contains a circled cross.
