= Emlagh East Cashel =

- Caiseal Imileá an Bhóthair (Irish)
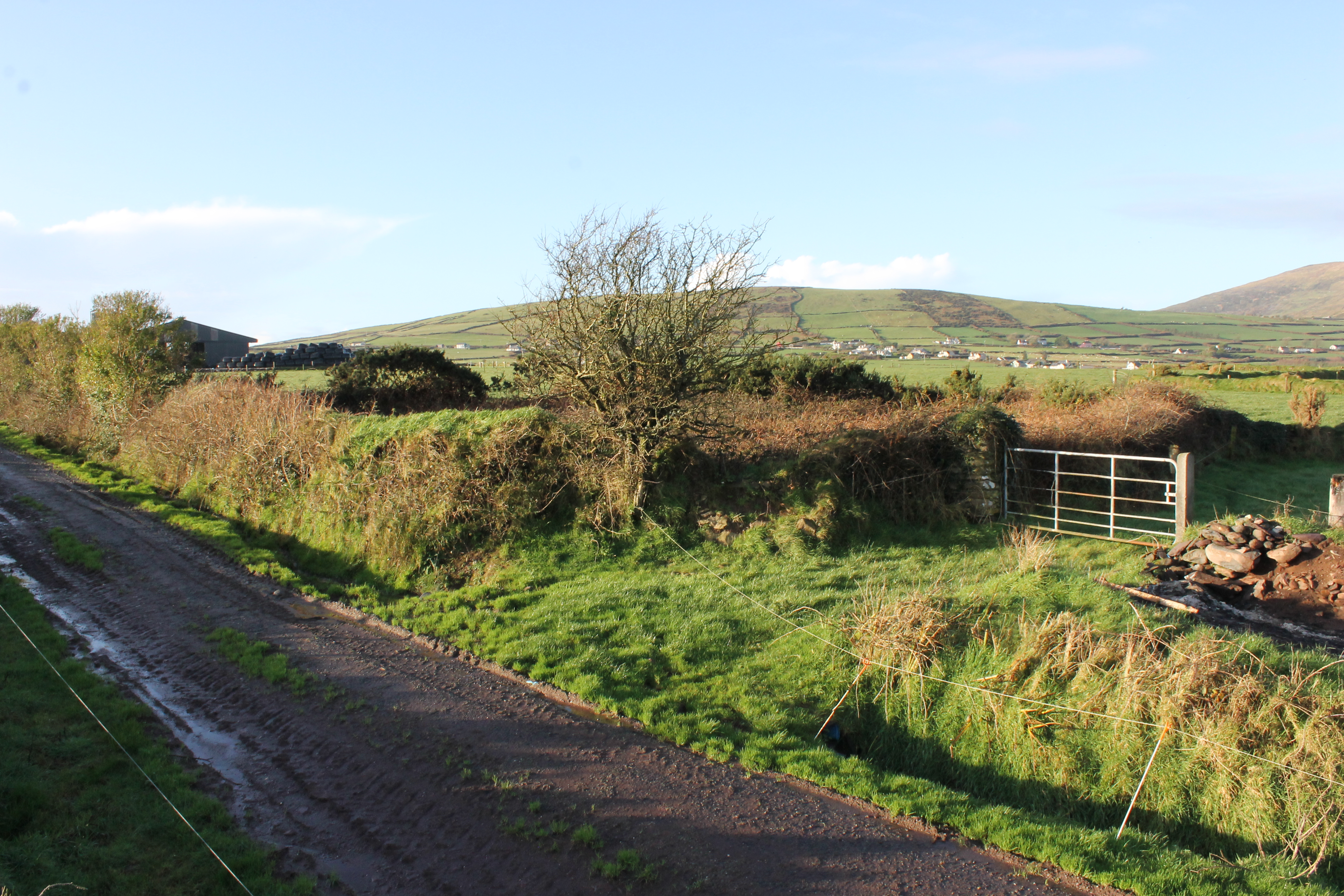
- The cashel in December 2025

- Location within Ireland
- 52.132803°N 10.225341°W
- Type: stone ringfort
- Location: Emlagh East, Dingle, County Kerry, Ireland

Site notes
- Elevation: 7 m (23 ft)
- Area: 0.2525 ha (0.624 acres)
- Architectural style: Gaelic Ireland
- Owner: State

National monument of Ireland
- Official name: Emlagh East Cashel
- Reference no.: 391

Emlagh East cashel is a stone ringfort (cashel) and National Monument located in County Kerry, Ireland.

== Location ==
Emlagh East cashel is located 3.2 km (2.0 mi) west-northwest of Dingle in the townland of Emlagh East.

== History ==
Emlagh East cashel is a cashel; a stone ringfort.

The archaeologist and author Peter Harbison described the monument in his 1970 work "Guide to the National and Historic Monuments of Ireland": A circular fort with a ditch, and surrounded by two walls.
