= Ballinknockane =

Site of Irish national monument

- Baile an Chnocáin (Irish)
- Location within Ireland
- 52.233438°N 10.298012°W
- Type: cillín, souterrain, hut sites
- Etymology: Irish: "settlement of the little hill"
- Location: Ballinknockane, Kilquane, County Kerry

History
- Built: 5th–8th centuries

Site notes
- Owner: state

National monument of Ireland
- Official name: Ballinknockane
- Reference no.: 221

Ballinknockane is the location of a National Monument in County Kerry, Ireland.

== Location ==
Ballinknockane is located west of Mount Brandon and south of the Brandon Stream; it is 7.3 km (4.5 mi) northeast of Murreagh.

== Description ==
The national monument consists of a cillín (calluragh), an unconsecrated burial ground. Nearby is a cashel (stone ringfort) with souterrain (underground storage tunnel) and several hut sites.

Hut sites include:

- Cloghaunnageragh ("Sheep Hut")
- Cloghaunglass ("Green Hut")
- Lisnagraigue
