= Ballywiheen =

National monument, County Kerry, Ireland

- Bhaile Uí Bhaoithín · Raingiléis
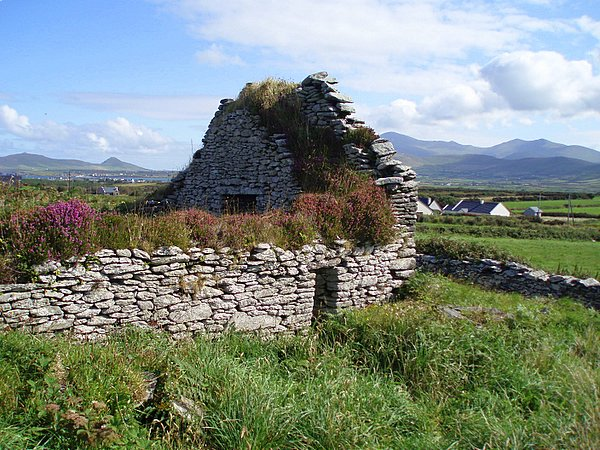
- Stone church

- Location within Ireland
- Interactive map of Ballywiheen

Monastery information
- Established: 6th century AD
- Diocese: Ardfert and Aghadoe

Architecture
- Status: ruined
- Style: Celtic

Site
- Location: Ballywiheen, Ballyferriter, County Kerry
- Coordinates: 52.158792°N 10.40702°W
- Visible remains: church
- Public access: yes

Ballywiheen (Irish: Baile Uí Bhaoithín) is a medieval Christian site and National Monument located on the Dingle Peninsula, Ireland.

== Location ==
Ballywiheen is located 800 m (half a mile) south of Ballyferriter, on the south side of Croaghmarhin mountain.

== History ==
There was an early Christian settlement here, also called Raingiléis.

The Ogham stone was erected as a grave marker c. AD 500–550. In the 1880s it was broken open in search of gold.

Excavations in 1998 turned up a stone lamp and flint scraper.

== Description ==
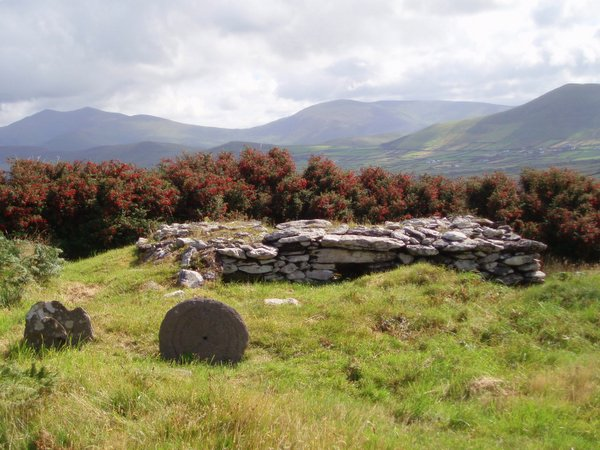
The cross slab (foreground) and ruined oratory.

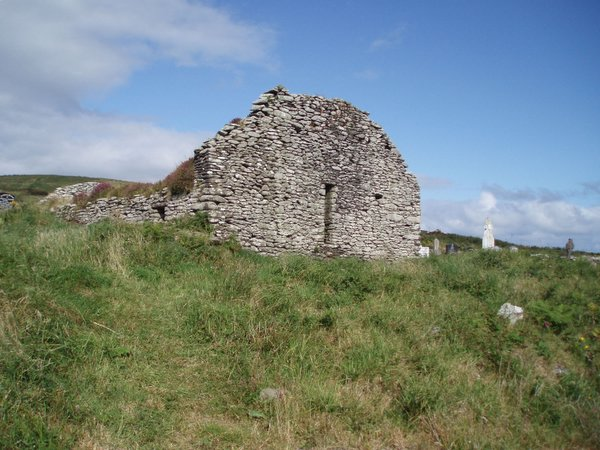
View of the church and burial ground.

Ballywiheen is surrounded by an enclosure 68 m (223 ft) in diameter. In the eastern part are the remains of an early drystone oratory. To the west are two mounds — these mark the location of two leachtaí (stone altars).

There is also a cross slab (decorated with Maltese cross), grave mounds (suggestive of a calluragh burial ground).

There is also a stone cross 123 cm (four feet) in height.

=== Cathair na gCat ===
The name Cathair na gCat means "the cat's stone fort" (the "cat" referred to is possibly the "tree cat", i.e. the pine marten.) This is a stone fort (cashel) located immediately south of Ballywiheen Christian site. It contains two stone huts and a possible souterrain.

The Ogham stone (dated to the early 6th century AD) reads TOGITTACC MAQI SAGARET[TOS], "of Toicthech son of Sáraid."
