= Callanafersy =

- Caladh na Feirse (Irish)
- Location within Ireland
- 52.137695°N 9.778073°W
- Type: stone ringfort
- Location: Callanafersy West, Killorglin, County Kerry, Ireland

History
- Built: c. 7th century AD

Site notes
- Elevation: 14 m (46 ft)
- Architectural style: Gaelic Ireland
- Owner: State

National monument of Ireland
- Official name: Callanafersy Ringfort
- Reference no.: 238

Callanafersy is a stone ringfort (cashel) and National Monument located in County Kerry, Ireland.

== Location ==
Callanafersy is 3.3 km (2.1 mi) north of Killorglin.

== History ==
The cashel was built around the 7th century AD as a defended farmstead.

== Description ==
This is a circular stone ringfort (caiseal).
