= Darrynane Beg Ogham Stone =

6th-century grave marker in Ireland

- Cloch Oghaim Dhoire Fhíonáin Beag (Irish)
- Caherdaniel Ogham Stone
- Location within Ireland
- 51.764126°N 10.121925°W
- Type: ogham stone
- Location: Derrynane Beg, Caherdaniel, County Kerry, Ireland

History
- Built: c. AD 500–550

Site notes
- Elevation: 5 m (16 ft)
- Height: 2.11 m (6 ft 11 in)
- Owner: Office of Public Works

National monument of Ireland
- Official name: Darrynane Beg Ogham Stone
- Reference no.: 346

The Darrynane Beg Ogham Stone is an ogham stone (CIIC 220) and a National Monument located in County Kerry, Ireland.

== Location ==
The stone originally lay recumbent on Derrynane strand. The Office of Public Works erected it by the roadside in the 1940s.

== History ==
This stone was erected as a grave marker, with inscription in Primitive Irish, some time in the early 6th century AD.

== Description ==
The stone is sandstone grit, 211 cm × 51 cm × 30 cm (83 in × 20 in × 12 in). The inscription, heavily weathered, reads ANM ḶḶATỊG̣[NI] Ṃ[A]Q [MINE]ṚC/ Ṃ[UCOI Q ̣ ̣ ? ̣ ̣CI?] ("name of Llatigni, son of Minerc, of the tribe of Q...ci") "Llatigni" contains the diminutive particle -gno-, suggesting the name Láithbe or Láithech. Min- is also a diminutive particle, suggesting "Little Erc" (Erc Becc).
