= Glanfahan =

Townland on the Dingle Peninsula, Ireland

- Gleann Fán (Irish)
- Fahan
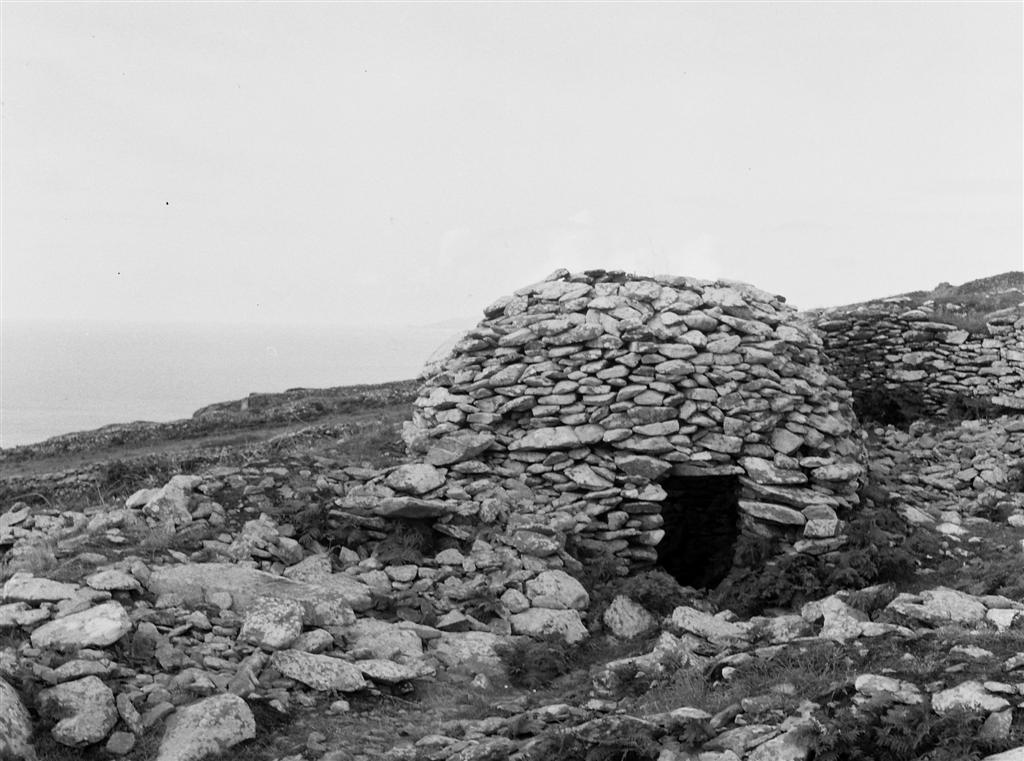
- Beehive hut (clochán)

- Location within Ireland
- 52.100713°N 10.434301°W
- Type: clocháns
- Cultures: Gaelic Irish
- Location: Glenfahan, Dunquin, County Kerry, Ireland
- Region: Dingle Peninsula

History
- Built: c. 700–1200
- Abandoned: 17th–18th century?

Site notes
- Material: stone
- Owner: State

National monument of Ireland
- Official name: Glanfahan
- Reference no.: 156

Glanfahan is a townland on the Dingle Peninsula, Ireland, notable for its large collection of clocháns, which form a National Monument.

== Location ==
Glanfahan is located on the southern slopes of Mount Eagle, overlooking Dingle Bay, 3.1 kilometres (1.9 mi) south of Dunquin.

== History ==
It is difficult to establish dates for Glenfahan as the drystone technique has been used in Ireland for millennia. However, it is believed to date to the early Christian period (5th–8th centuries AD), linked to the monastic traditions of the region and perhaps the pilgrimage route to Skellig Michael.

Other historians place their construction in the 12th century, when Norman invaders forced the Gaelic Irish to peripheral areas like the Dingle Peninsula.

It has been theorised that the huts were inhabited by the unfree and cashels by the freemen. Some Irish cashels remained in occupation up to the 18th century AD.

In the 19th century a cross-slab and rotary quern were found in Cahermurphy.

Some of the archeological sites were damaged in the 20th century by agricultural "improvements."

Excavations in 2011–12 under "Clochaun 3" turned up a sharpening stone, hammerstone and pieces of flint and quartz. Bone finds included sheep, goats (with flensing marks) and fish, as well as a wrasse tooth of a kind used in amulets. Bivalve shells and hazelnut shells were also found.

== Description ==
There are 417 recorded dry stone structures, 19 souterrains and 18 standing stones in the area.

A group of clocháns, built in a traditional corbelling style, form an abandoned village.

=== Caherconner ===
An oval-shaped stone cashel containing three beehive huts.

=== Cahermurphy ===
An oval stone cashel 23 m (75 ft) in diameter. The interior is occupied by a group of five conjoined clochauns and a sixth irregularly-shaped structure.

=== Caherfadaandoruis ===
An unusual cluster with three conjoined chambers, joined by a passage 23 m (75 ft) long.

=== Caheradurras ===
A triple clochaun.
