= Reenconnell =

Medieval Christian site, County Kerry, Ireland

- Rinn Chonaill
- Location within Ireland
- Interactive map of Reenconnell

Monastery information
- Diocese: Ardfert and Aghadoe

Architecture
- Status: ruined
- Style: Celtic

Site
- Location: Reenconnell, Kilmalkedar, County Kerry
- Coordinates: 52.185339°N 10.302927°W
- Visible remains: church
- Public access: yes

Reenconnell is a medieval Christian site and National Monument located on the Dingle Peninsula, County Kerry, Ireland.

== Location ==
Reenconnell is 5.7 kilometres (3.5 mi) north-northwest of Dingle. Reenconnell is 274 metres (899 feet) high. The peak overlooks the village of Brandon Creek.

== History ==
Reenconnell is a medieval Christian site. It is reportedly the hill that St. Brendan once looked out to the Atlantic Ocean and decided to sail out towards it seeking the "Isle of the Blessed" (later called Saint Brendan's Island) as recorded in the 9th century manuscript, The Voyage of Saint Brendan the Abbot. It was used as part of a walking trail for hikers and pilgrims heading en route to Mount Brandon.

== Church ==
Reenconnell has a church on it originally dedicated by St. Maolcethair in the 6th century AD but later rebuilt in the 12th century in Irish Romanesque style to resemble the chapel built on the Rock of Cashel. The church's graveyard at Calluragh/An Ceallúnach on Reenconnell was set aside for unbaptized children. A six-foot (1.8 m)-tall High cross was erected on the site to mark the location of the graves. In addition there are also stones with Ogham inscriptions amongst several smaller stone crosses. One of which is dated to the 6th century with Latin script. Pilgrims also carved a rock spiral in Reenconnell as a celebration of seeing Feothanach. However, it is also speculated that the spiral pre-dated Christian pilgrimage and was a symbol of Celtic paganism of unknown meaning.
