= Reask =

Ruined early Monastic site, County Kerry

Coordinates: 52°10′2.74″N 10°23′16.02″W

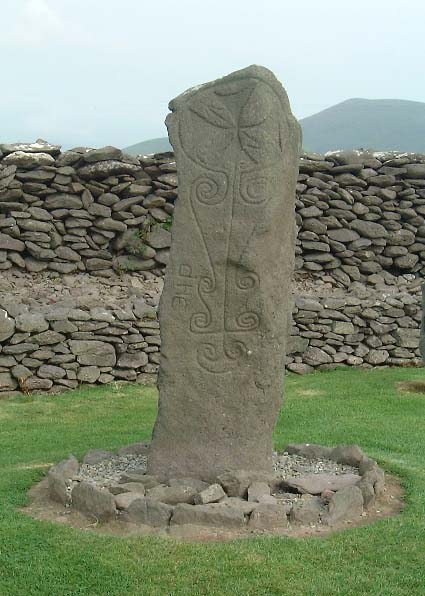
Ogham standing stone at Reask

Reask (Irish: Riasc) is a ruined early monastic site located 1 km east of Baile an Fheirtéaraigh, County Kerry, Ireland. The remains of the site include the low remnants of buildings and enclosure walls and a cross-slab standing stone which sits in the middle of the compound.

Some of the artefacts found in the excavation at Reask, including some of the cross-inscribed stones, are on display in Músaem Chorca Dhuibhne, which is in the nearby village of Baile an Fheirtéaraigh. The Reask Cross Pillar is similar to the pillars found nearby at Kilfountain and Kilmalkedar on the Dingle Peninsula.

The site is a National Monument in state care.

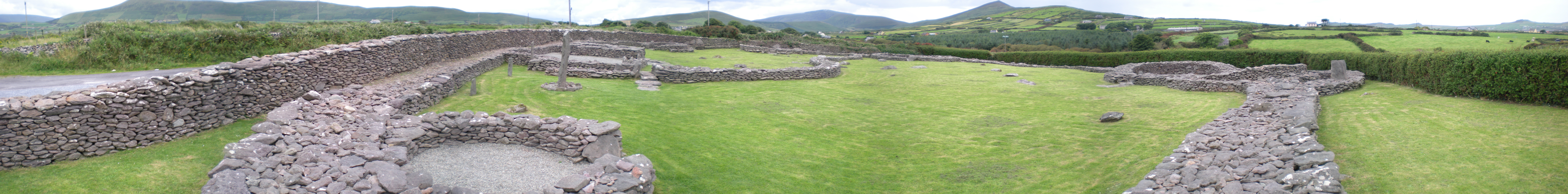
Reask Monastic Site panorama

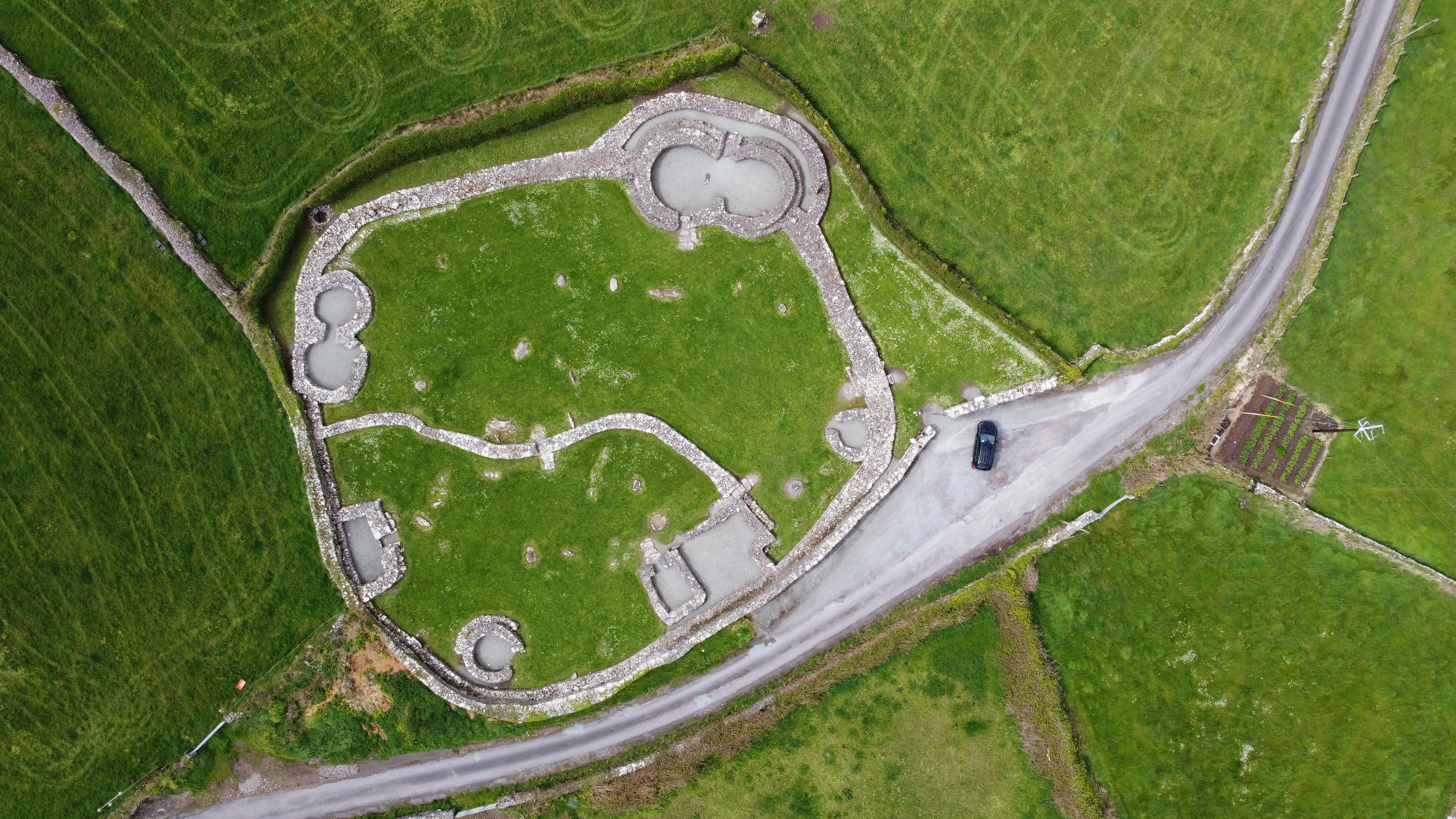
Aerial view of Reask Monastic site, Ireland

== Sources ==
- McNally, Kenneth. "Ireland's Ancient Stones". Belfast: Appletree Press, 2006. ISBN 0-86281-996-2
- Noonan, Damien. "Castles & Ancient Monuments of Ireland". London: Arum Press, 2001. ISBN 1-85410-752-6
- Fanning, Thomas. "Excavation of an Early Christian Cemetery and Settlement at Reask, County Kerry, 1981, Proceedings of the Royal Irish Academy Vol.81C, p67-172
