= Clochán =

Dry-stone hut in Ireland

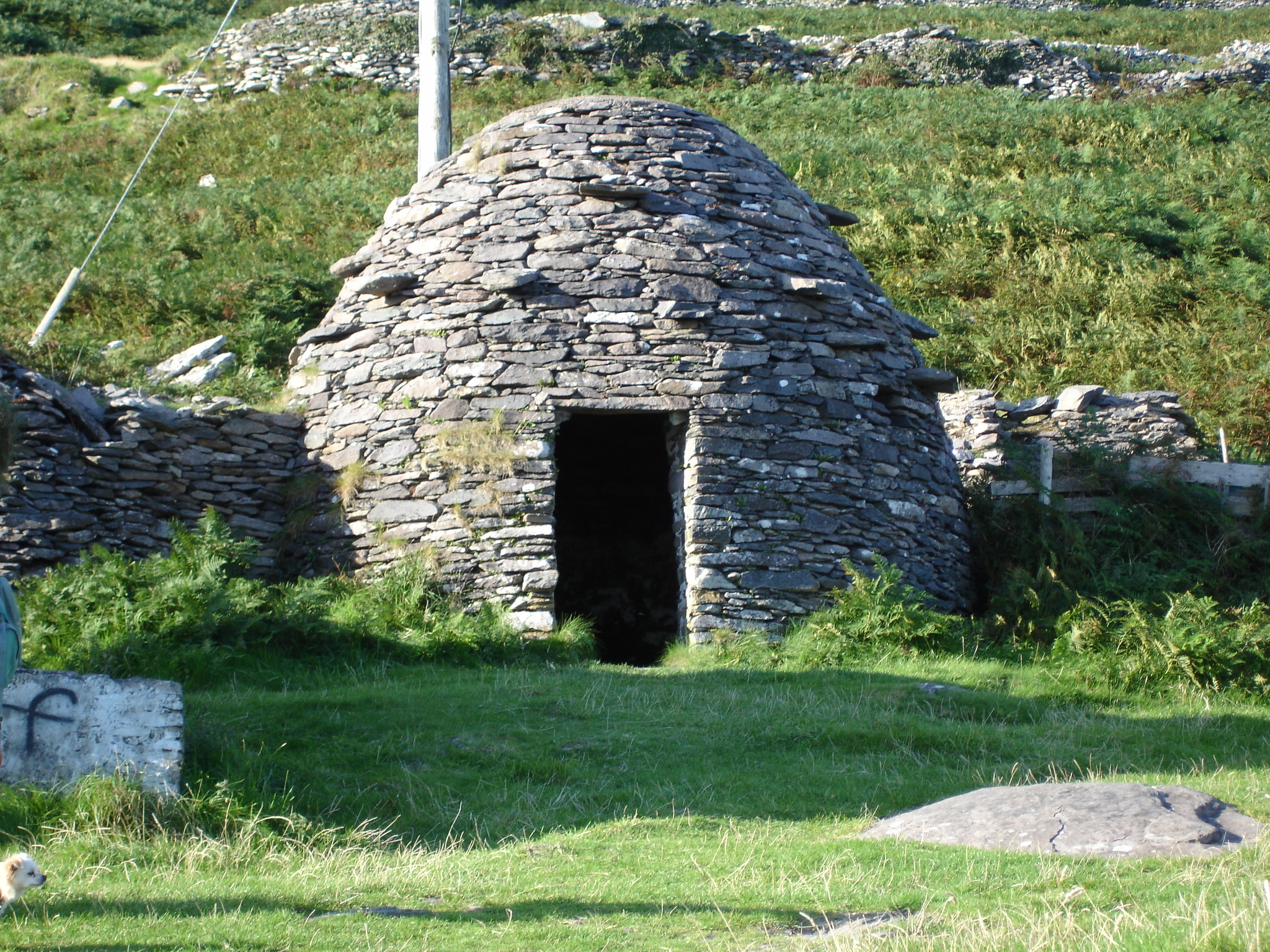
A clochán on the Dingle Peninsula, Kerry, Ireland

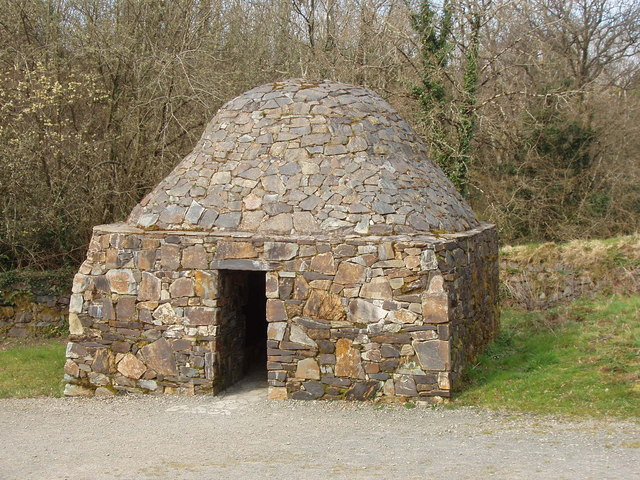
A reconstruction of a square-shaped beehive hut at the Irish National Heritage Park, County Wexford

A clochán (plural clocháin) or beehive hut is a dry-stone hut with a corbelled roof, commonly associated with the south-western Irish seaboard. The precise construction date of most of these structures is unknown with the buildings belonging to a long-established Celtic tradition, though there is at present no direct evidence to date the surviving examples before c. 700 CE. Some associated with religious sites may be pre-Romanesque, some consider that the most fully intact structures date after the 12th century or later. It is where monks lived.

== Form ==
They are most commonly round beehive huts, but rectangular plans are known as well. It has been suggested that the rectangular footprints date to a later era. Some clocháin are not completely built of stone and may have possessed a thatched roof. The walls are very thick, up to 1.5 metres (4 ft 11 in). Sometimes several clocháin are joined by their walls.

== Locations ==
Clocháin are mainly found in the Southwest of Ireland, for example at Skellig Michael, Church Island off Beginish Island, Glanfahan, Fahan and Reask in the Dingle Peninsula of County Kerry. Many occur in religious contexts such as used by the monks following Saint Patrick; moreover, his successors carried on the architectural tradition in the Scottish island of Iona and eventually via Aidan to the eastern English islands of Farne and Holy Island.

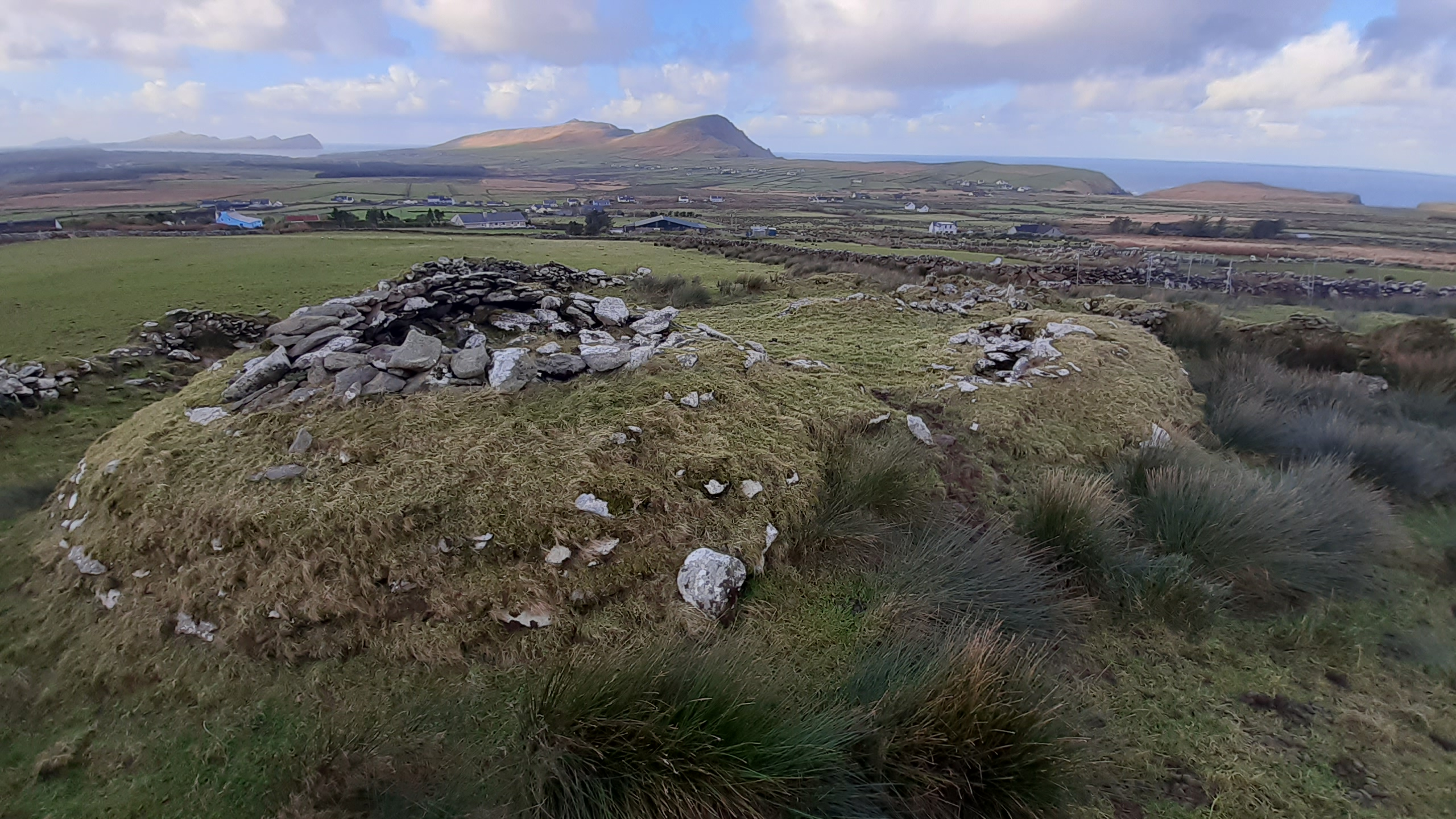
Remains of clocháns at Ballynavenooragh on the Dingle peninsula, County Kerry

There are others in ringforts (such as Leacanabuaile, County Kerry) that are commonly interpreted as secular dwellings. Elaborate dry walled stone churches like the Gallarus Oratory may derive from the clochán. The clochán has been described in the 7th to 8th-century law Críth Gablach. Beehive huts are also found in West Penwith, Cornwall.

== Popular culture ==
Parts of the 2017 film Star Wars: The Last Jedi were filmed using the beehive huts on the island of Skellig Michael. Because of the restrictions regarding filming on the island, a set of replica beehive huts were also built in 2016 at Ceann Sibéal, near Ballyferriter, on the Dingle Peninsula.

== See also ==
- Beehive house
- Christian monasticism
- Chysauster Romano-British settlement in southwest Britain
- Cleit
- Dry stone
- Hermits
- Vernacular architecture
