= List of national monuments in Munster =

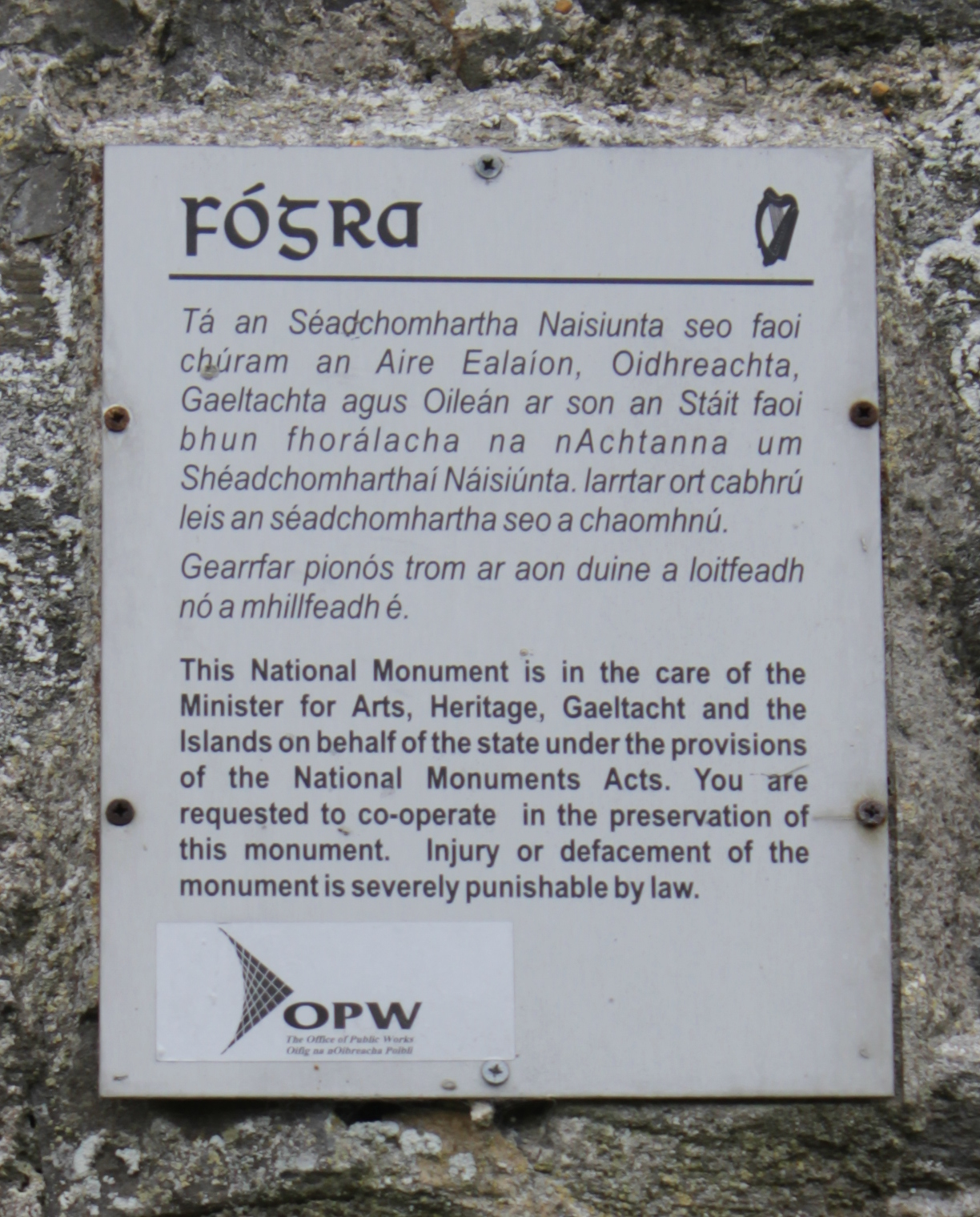
Photo of a typical notice at a national monument in Ireland.

The Irish state has officially approved the following list of national monuments of Ireland. In Ireland, a structure or site may be deemed to be a "national monument", and therefore worthy of state protection, if it is of national importance. If the land adjoining the monument is essential to protect it, this land may also be protected.

== National Monuments in Munster ==
Clare - Cork - Kerry - Limerick - Tipperary - Waterford

This list is initially sorted by county. If the list is sorted under another heading, the county links above will take you to the first item from the county in the sorted list

NM#	Monument name	Description	Image	Townland	County	Location
11	Corcomroe Abbey	Abbey (Cistercian)		Abbey West	53°07′37″N 9°03′14″W	
648	Ballyallaban ringfort	Ringforts		Ballyallaban	53°05′24″N 9°09′31″W	
574	Tau Cross (Cross Inneenboy)	Cross		Ballycashen, Roughan	52°58′40″N 9°06′53″W	
484	Ballyhickey Wedge Tomb	Wedge Tomb		Ballyhickey	52°50′04″N 8°51′20″W	
591	Brian Boru's Fort	Ringfort		Ballyvally	52°49′08″N 8°27′06″W	
478	Bunratty Castle	Castle		Bunratty East	52°41′48″N 8°48′42″W	
466	Caheraphuca Wedge Tomb	Wedge Tomb		Caheraphuca	52°56′05″N 8°54′18″W	
354	Cahermacnaghten	Cashel		Cahermacnaghten	53°02′45″N 9°11′54″W	
195	Canon Island Abbey	Abbey (Augustinian)		Canon Island	52°40′44″N 9°02′13″W	
197	Clare Abbey	Abbey (Augustinian)		Clarecastle	52°49′44″N 8°58′08″W	
583	Dromore Castle	Castle		Dromore (Ruan)	52°55′31″N 8°57′46″W	
204	Drumcliff	Church & Round Tower		Drumcliff	52°52′04″N 8°59′51″W	
170	Ennis Friary	Friary (Franciscan)		Ennis	52°50′45″N 8°58′53″W	
509	Gleninagh Castle	Castle		Gleninagh North	53°08′16″N 9°12′21″W	
14	Inchicronan Abbey	Abbey (Augustinian)		Inchicronan	52°55′05″N 8°54′24″W	
5	Inishcaltra (Inis Cealtra)	Early Medieval Ecclesiastical Site		Mountshannon	52°54′53″N 8°27′01″W	
7	Kilfenora	Church		Kilcarragh	52°59′23″N 9°13′23″W	
9	Kilfenora Abbey	Friary (Franciscan)		Kilfenora	52°59′27″N 9°13′05″W	
8	Kilfenora	Cathedral & Crosses		Kilfenora	52°59′26″N 9°13′01″W	
279	St. Molua's Church	Church		Killaloe	52°48′25″N 8°26′40″W	
448	Leamaneh Castle	Castle		Leamaneah North	52°59′15″N 9°08′23″W	
16	Dysert O'Dea	Church, Round Tower & Cross		Mollaneen	52°54′33″N 9°04′06″W	
649	Mooghaun	Hillfort		Mooghaun	52°46′59″N 8°52′43″W	
176	Killone Abbey	Abbey (Augustinian)		Ennis	52°48′22″N 9°00′15″W	
12	Oughtmama	Three Churches		Oughtmama	53°07′01″N 9°02′19″W	
17	Ruan Church	Church		Portlecka	52°55′41″N 8°59′24″W	
632	Poulnabrone	Portal Tomb		Poulnabrone	53°02′55″N 9°08′24″W	
15	Quin Abbey	Friary (Franciscan)		Quin	52°49′09″N 8°51′47″W	
427	Carrigaholt Castle	Castle		Carrigaholt	52°36′00″N 9°41′58″W	
10	Scattery Island (Inis Cathaigh)	Early Medieval Ecclesiastical Site		Kilrush	52°36′42″N 9°31′10″W	
6	St. Flannan's Cathedral	Church		Killaloe	52°48′23″N 8°26′21″W	
270	Slievenaglasha Wedge Tomb	Wedge Tomb		Slievenaglasha	53°01′02″N 9°03′06″W	
13	Temple Cronan	Church		Termon	53°02′46″N 9°03′40″W	
224	Magh Adhair	Inauguration Site		Toonagh	52°50′28″N 8°49′44″W	
270	Tullycommon Wedge Tomb	Wedge Tomb		Tullycommon	53°01′32″N 9°03′31″W	
270	Cashlaungarr	Cashel		Tullycommon	53°00′48″N 9°04′47″W	
270	Cahercommaun	Cashel		Carran	53°00′52″N 9°04′14″W	
645	Altar Wedge Tomb	Wedge Tomb		Altar	51°30′49″N 9°38′38″W	
314	Ardskeagh Church	Church		Ardskeagh (Fermoy barony)	52°19′55″N 8°37′41″W	
301	Ballybeg	Dovecote		Ballybeg East	52°13′13″N 8°40′11″W	
301	Ballybeg	Tower		Ballybeg West	52°13′12″N 8°40′07″W	
301	Ballybeg Abbey	Friary (Augustinian)		Buttevant	52°13′10″N 8°40′11″W	
22	Templekieran, Clear Island	Church & Cross inscribed pillar		Ballyieragh North	51°26′27″N 9°30′22″W	
425	Ballinacarriga Castle	Castle		Dunmanway	51°42′20″N 9°01′54″W	
641	Barryscourt Castle	Castle		Carrigtwohill	51°54′17″N 8°15′34″W	
594	Blossomfort	Ringfort		Blossomfort	52°09′41″N 8°45′15″W	
558	Glanworth	Medieval tower		Boherash	52°11′21″N 8°21′20″W	
558	Glanworth Castle	Castle		Glanworth	52°11′17″N 8°21′17″W	
558	Rock Abbey, Glanworth	Friary (Franciscan)		Boherash	52°11′21″N 8°21′22″W	
450	Breeny More Stone Circle	Stone Circle & boulder burials		Breeny More	51°44′32″N 9°22′30″W	
202	Buttevant Abbey	Friary (Franciscan)		Buttevant	52°13′52″N 8°40′09″W	
233	Cahervagliar	Ringfort		Cappeen West	51°47′35″N 8°59′49″W	
660	Carrigagulla	Stone Circle		Ballinagree	52°00′01″N 8°54′59″W	
255	Carrigaphooca Castle	Castle		Carrigaphooca	51°54′31″N 9°01′42″W	
255	Carrigaphooca stone circle	Stone Circle		Carrigaphooca	51°54′35″N 9°01′30″W	
656	Castledonovan Castle	Castle		Castledonovan	51°41′32″N 9°16′57″W	
281	Mallow Castle	Castle		Castlelands	52°08′02″N 8°38′22″W	
536	Clodagh Standing Stones	Standing Stones - Pair		Clodagh, County Cork	51°41′53″N 9°13′27″W	
240	Conna Castle	Castle		Conna	52°05′40″N 8°06′06″W	
592	Carn Tierna	Hillfort & Cairn		Coolcarron (Fermoy)	52°06′54″N 8°16′58″W	
565	Coolcoulaghta Standing Stones	Standing Stones - Pair		Coolcoulaghta	51°35′48″N 9°32′36″W	
395	Coole Upper Churches	Two Churches		Coole Upper	52°06′31″N 8°12′12″W	
600	Derryarkane Stone Circle	Stone Circle & Standing Stone		Derryarkane	51°43′43″N 9°22′19″W	
296	Drishane Castle	Castle		Drishane More	52°04′31″N 9°02′55″W	
339	Dromaneen Castle	Castle		Dromaneen	52°07′35″N 8°43′50″W	
381	Drombeg	Circle, Hut Site & Fulacht Fiadh		Glandore	51°33′52″N 9°05′13″W	
169	Sherkin Abbey	Friary (Franciscan)		Sherkin Island	51°28′34″N 9°24′01″W	
374	Farranahineeny Stone Row	Stone Row		Farranahineeny	51°47′42″N 9°08′20″W	
284	Knockdrum Stone Fort	Cashel		Farrandau	51°31′36″N 9°11′37″W	
426	Ballycrovane Ogham Stone	Ogham Stone		Faunkill and the Woods	51°42′47″N 9°56′41″W	
535	Charles Fort	Star-Shaped-Fort		Summer Cove	51°41′47″N 8°29′56″W	
552	Greenhill Ogham Stones	Ogham Stones		Greenhill	52°04′40″N 8°36′25″W	
502	Island Wedge Tomb	Wedge Tomb		Island (Rahan)	52°04′04″N 8°34′47″W	
490	Kilbolane Castle	Castle		Milford	52°20′20″N 8°51′04″W	
182	Kilcrea Abbey	Friary (Franciscan)		Ovens	51°51′54″N 8°42′41″W	
316	Kileenemer Church	Church		Killeenemer	52°12′56″N 8°19′43″W	
436	Kilnaruane Carved Pillar Stone	Shaft of High Cross		Kilnaruane	51°40′17″N 9°28′05″W	
420	Knocknakilla	Stone Circle		Macroom and Millstreet	52°00′22″N 9°01′25″W	
318	Labbacallee wedge tomb	Wedge Tomb		Labbacallee	52°10′27″N 8°20′04″W	
18	Labbamolaga Church	Church & Grave slabs		Labbamolaga Middle	52°18′39″N 8°20′51″W	
333	Liscarroll Castle	Castle		Liscarroll	52°15′40″N 8°48′12″W	
571	Lissacresig Stone Circle	Stone Circle		Lissacresig	51°55′32″N 9°03′43″W	
571	Lissacresig Ringfort	Ringfort		Lissacresig	51°55′28″N 9°03′21″W	
	Maughanasilly Stone Row	Stone Row		Maughanasilly	51°46′14″N 9°23′11″W	
411	Castlelyons Friary	Friary (Carmelite)		Mohera	52°05′21″N 8°14′01″W	
525	James Fort	Star-Shaped-Fort & Blockhouse		Castlepark	51°41′55″N 8°30′44″W	
517	Kanturk Castle	Castle		Kanturk	52°09′53″N 8°54′10″W	
580	Skeagh Cairn	Ring barrow & Cairn		Skeagh (Abbeystrowry)	51°34′29″N 9°20′18″W	
	Mount Gabriel	Prehistoric copper mines		Mount Gabriel	51°33′07″N 9°31′51″W	
618	Kinneigh Round Tower	Round Tower		Castletown-Kinneigh	51°45′50″N 8°58′31″W	
21	Timoleague Abbey	Friary (Franciscan)		Timoleague	51°38′35″N 8°45′49″W	
360	Desmond Castle or The French Prison, Kinsale	Tower House		Kinsale	51°42′26″N 8°31′29″W	
299	Tullylease Church	Church & Grave Slabs		Tullylease	52°19′00″N 8°56′23″W	
634	Michael Collins birth place	Site with historic associations		Woodfield (Kilkerranmore)	51°37′00″N 8°58′50″W	
286	North Abbey, Youghal	Friary (Dominican)		Youghal	51°57′27″N 7°51′16″W	
56	Annagh Church	Church		Annagh	52°14′54″N 9°45′17″W	
430	Ardcanaght Stones	Ogham Stones		Ardcanaght	52°10′10″N 9°43′35″W	
54	Ardfert Cathedral	Cathedral & 2 Churches		Ardfert	52°19′44″N 9°46′54″W	
358	Ardfert Abbey	Friary (Franciscan)		Ardfert	52°19′49″N 9°46′26″W	
221.01	Arraglen Ogham Stone	Ogham Stone		Arraglen (Corkaguiney Barony)	52°15′28″N 10°14′55″W	
355	Gallaunmore	Standing stone		Ballineetig	52°08′21″N 10°13′22″W	
221.1416	Ballinknockane	Burial ground & possible church		Ballinknockane (Kilquane civil parish)	52°14′00″N 10°17′53″W	
221.1416	Ballinknockane	Hut sites		Ballinknockane (Kilquane civil parish)	52°14′03″N 10°17′30″W	
221.1416	Ballinknockane	Hut site & souterrain		Ballinknockane (Kilquane civil parish)	52°14′12″N 10°17′37″W	
168	Ballinskelligs Abbey	Priory (Augustinian)		Ballinskelligs	51°48′55″N 10°16′18″W	
64	Ballintaggart Ogham Stones	Ogham Stones		Ballintaggart	52°07′40″N 10°14′35″W	
221	Ballybowler North Ogham Stone	Ogham Stone		Ballybowler North	52°10′36″N 10°13′21″W	
364	Ballymalis Castle	Castle		Ballymalis	52°05′05″N 9°41′33″W	
62	Teampall Geal (St. Manchan's Oratory)	Early Medieval Ecclesiastical Site & ogham stone		Ballymorereagh	52°09′16″N 10°19′53″W	
221.0712	Cathair na BhFionnúrach	Stone fort, huts & souterrain		Ballynavenooragh	52°13′34″N 10°17′53″W	
221.0712	Ballynavenooragh	Stone fort & hut		Ballynavenooragh	52°13′38″N 10°17′48″W	
221.2425	Cathair na gCat	Cashel & Ogham Stone		Ballywiheen	52°09′22″N 10°24′27″W	
221.2425	Ballywiheen	Early Medieval Ecclesiastical Site		Ballywiheen	52°09′32″N 10°24′25″W	
380, 492	Beenbane	Calluragh, hut sites, cross slab, enclosure, souterrain, cross, standing stones		Beenbane	51°49′55″N 10°09′25″W	
500	Beginish house	Stone-built house		Beginish	51°56′20″N 10°17′24″W	
184	Caherconree Fort	Promontory Fort (Inland)		Caherconree	52°11′51″N 9°51′47″W	
221.4748	Caherdorgan North Cashel	Cashel		Caherdorgan North	52°10′45″N 10°20′22″W	
221.4748	The Chancellor's House	Building - medieval		Caherdorgan North	52°10′54″N 10°20′18″W	
238	Callanafersy (Lisgortnageragh)	Ringfort		Callanafersy West	52°08′13″N 9°46′28″W	
249	Carrigafoyle Castle	Castle		Ballylongford	52°34′12″N 9°29′39″W	
59	Church Island (Valentia Harbour)	Early Medieval Ecclesiastical Site		Beginish	51°56′15″N 10°17′00″W	
60	Church Island (Lough Currane)	Early Medieval Ecclesiastical Site		Lough Currane	51°50′07″N 10°07′49″W	
228	Cloghanecarhan	Ringfort & Ogham Stone		Cloghanecarhan	51°53′18″N 10°11′02″W	
385	Dunloe Ogham Stones	Ogham Stones		Coolmagort	52°03′36″N 9°38′05″W	
346	Darrynane Beg Ogham Stone	Ogham Stone		Derrynane	51°45′51″N 10°07′19″W	
221.45	Doonmore	Promontory Fort		Doonsheane	52°07′07″N 10°13′19″W	
221.46	Emlagh East Ogham Stone	Ogham Stone		Emlagh East (Dingle civil parish)	52°07′54″N 10°13′00″W	
391	Emlagh East Cashel	Cashel		Emlagh East (Dingle civil parish)	52°07′58″N 10°13′31″W	
177	Dunbeg Fort	Promontory Fort		Fahan	52°06′12″N 10°24′31″W	
65	Gallarus Castle	Castle		Baile na nGall	52°10′33″N 10°21′21″W	
66	Gallarus Oratory	Early Medieval Ecclesiastical Site		Baile na nGall	52°10′22″N 10°20′58″W	
64	Garfinny	Cemetery		Garfinny	52°08′53″N 10°14′03″W	
612	Garfinny Bridge	Bridge		Garfinny/Flemingstown	52°08′59″N 10°13′38″W	
156	Cathair Sayer	Clochaun		Glanfahan	52°06′00″N 10°26′17″W	
156	Cathair Martín	Clochaun		Glanfahan	52°06′07″N 10°25′29″W	
156	Cathair Murphy	Clochaun		Glanfahan	52°06′03″N 10°26′03″W	
156	Cathair Síleoid	Clochán		Glanfahan		
156	Caher Conor	Cashel		Glanfahan	52°06′06″N 10°25′17″W	
221.33	Glin North	Clochán & stone fort		Glin North	52°10′52″N 10°16′53″W	
221.34	Glin North	Cashel		Glin North	52°10′49″N 10°17′09″W	
63	Rinn an Chaisleáin	Church site		Great Blasket Island	52°06′19″N 10°30′40″W	
61	Skellig Michael	Early Medieval Ecclesiastical Site		Great Skellig	51°46′20″N 10°32′19″W	
67	Illauntannig	Early Medieval Ecclesiastical Site		Illauntannig	52°19′34″N 10°01′12″W	
63	Inishtooskert	Early Medieval Ecclesiastical Site		Inishtooskert	52°04′55″N 10°34′05″W	
63	Inishvickillane	Early Medieval Ecclesiastical Site		Inishvickillane	52°02′39″N 10°36′31″W	
183	Innisfallen Abbey	Church, Oratory & Abbey (Benedictine)		Innisfallen Island	52°02′48″N 9°33′15″W	
329	Kilcoolaght East ogham stones	Ogham Stones		Kilcoolaght East	52°04′26″N 9°44′46″W	
593	Killelton Church	Church		Killelton	52°13′41″N 9°52′26″W	
65	Kilmalkedar	Early Medieval Ecclesiastical Site		Kilmalkedar	52°11′06″N 10°20′11″W	
221.22	Keelers' Stone	Bullaun Stone		Kilmalkedar	52°11′08″N 10°20′18″W	
221.23	St. Brendan's Oratory	Church		Kilmalkedar	52°11′05″N 10°20′11″W	
227	Cahergall	Cashel		Kimego West	51°57′21″N 10°15′28″W	
414	Leacanabuaile	Cashel		Kimego West	51°57′30″N 10°15′43″W	
258	Lislaughtin Abbey	Friary (Franciscan)		Lislaughtin	52°33′27″N 9°28′12″W	
260	Listowel Castle	Castle		Listowel	52°26′40″N 9°29′13″W	
611	Loher Cashel	Cashel		Loher	51°47′10″N 10°09′56″W	
221.02	Maumanorig	Early Medieval Ecclesiastical Site		Maumanorig	52°08′38″N 10°21′31″W	
311	Muckross Abbey	Friary (Franciscan)		Killarney National Park	52°01′34″N 9°29′42″W	
53	Aghadoe	Early Medieval Ecclesiastical Site		Parkavonear	52°04′36″N 9°33′16″W	
236	Parkavonear Castle	Castle		Parkavonear	52°04′33″N 9°33′18″W	
10001	Illaunloughan	Early Medieval Ecclesiastical Site		Portmagee	51°53′12″N 10°22′25″W	
221.21	Rahinnane Castle	Castle, Ringfort and Souterrain		Rahinnane	52°08′35″N 10°22′59″W	
57	Ratass Church	Church & Ogham Stone		Ratass	52°16′01″N 9°40′55″W	
55	Rattoo	Early Medieval Ecclesiastical Site		Rattoo	52°26′33″N 9°39′00″W	
519	Reask	Early Medieval Ecclesiastical Site		Reask	52°10′03″N 10°23′16″W	
221.35	Reenconnell	Early Medieval Ecclesiastical Site		Reenconnell	52°11′07″N 10°18′11″W	
534	Ross Castle	Castle		Ross Island	52°02′28″N 9°31′53″W	
221.27	Dún an Óir (Fort del Oro)	Promontory Fort		Smerwick	52°11′27″N 10°24′52″W	
143	Staigue	Cashel		Sneem	51°48′18″N 10°00′56″W	
303	Tonaknock Cross	Cross		Tonaknock	52°22′59″N 9°41′54″W	
295	Tullygarran ogham stones	Two Ogham Stones		Tullygarran	52°16′33″N 9°38′33″W	
212	Kilmallock Abbey	Friary (Dominican)		Abbeyfarm	52°24′09″N 8°34′30″W	
622	Desmond Castle	Castle		Adare	52°34′10″N 8°46′56″W	
201	Askeaton Castle	Castle		Askeaton	52°36′00″N 8°58′26″W	
625	Ballylanders fort	Ringfort		Ballylanders	52°22′51″N 8°21′09″W	
247	Lough Gur	Enclosure		Bruff	52°30′51″N 8°32′31″W	
247	Lough Gur Tomb	Megalithic Tomb unclassified		Lough Gur	52°30′31″N 8°31′55″W	
85	Mungret Churches	Three Churches		Baunacloka, Dromdarrig	52°38′04″N 8°40′32″W	
194	Hospital Church	Church (Knights Hospitallers)		Barrysfarm	52°28′34″N 8°25′57″W	
83	Dísert Óengusa	Early Medieval Hermitage		Carrigeen (Croom)	52°31′15″N 8°44′41″W	
636, 582	Desmond Hall and Castle	Medieval Castle Complex		Newcastlewest	52°27′00″N 9°03′42″W	
84	Clonkeen Church	Church		Clonkeen (Barrington)	52°38′38″N 8°27′36″W	
345	Killeen Cowpark	Church		Cowpark	52°36′29″N 8°53′38″W	
663	Cush Earthworks	Earthworks		Cush	52°22′52″N 8°26′34″W	
315	Duntryleague passage tomb	Passage Tomb		Deerpark (Duntryleague)	52°24′23″N 8°19′21″W	
555	Rathard	Ringfort		Garryheakin	52°31′03″N 8°18′24″W	
341	Killulta Church	Church		Glennameade	52°37′45″N 8°50′10″W	
268	Glenquin Castle	Castle		Killeedy	52°23′02″N 9°06′25″W	
247	Lough Gur Stone Circle	Stone Circle (potential)		Lough Gur	52°30′55″N 8°32′29″W	
247	Lough Gur Standing Stone	Standing Stone		Lough Gur	52°31′02″N 8°32′23″W	
247	Grange stone circle	Embanked Stone Circle		Grange	52°30′51″N 8°32′30″W	
247	The Spectacles	House sites & field system		Lough Gur	52°31′26″N 8°31′17″W	
247	Crock Island	Crannóg		Grange	52°31′12″N 8°32′16″W	
247	Lough Gur Megalithic Structure	Megalithic Structure		Lough Gur		
680	Kilmallock Medieval House	Medieval House		Abbeyfarm (Kilmallock)	52°24′02″N 8°34′23″W	
408	Collegiate Church of SS Peter & Paul	Church		Killmallock	52°24′04″N 8°34′29″W	
173	King John's Castle	Castle		Kilmallock	52°24′05″N 8°34′36″W	
538	Kilmihill Ringfort	Ringfort		Kilmihil (Ballingarry)	52°27′31″N 8°50′49″W	
247	Lough Gur Cemetery	Cairn		Lough Gur	52°30′39″N 8°31′39″W	
247	Lough Gur Ringfort	Ringfort		Lough Gur		
576	De Valera's Cottage	House with historic associations		Knockmore	52°26′01″N 8°39′25″W	
86	Killaliathan Church (Killagholehane church, Our Lady of the Snows)	Church		Lacka Lower	52°19′54″N 8°58′38″W	
366	Kilrush Church	Church		Limerick	52°39′39″N 8°39′19″W	
288	King John's Castle	Castle		Limerick	52°40′11″N 8°37′32″W	
383	Fanning's Castle	Castle		Limerick (Creagh Lane)	52°40′02″N 8°37′19″W	
247	Lough Gur House	Prehistoric House Site		Lough Gur		
247	Lough Gur Wedge Tomb	Wedge Tomb		Lough Gur		
247	Knockadoon	Prehistoric Habitation		Lough Gur		
247	Carraig Aille	Enclosure		Lough Gur		
247	Lough Gur Cemetery Mound	Cemetery Mound		Lough Gur		
247	Leagun	Standing Stone		Lough Gur		
185	Askeaton Abbey	Friary (Franciscan)		Moig South	52°36′14″N 8°58′31″W	
171	Monasteranenagh Abbey	Abbey (Cistercian)		Monaster South	52°31′01″N 8°39′46″W	
459	Ardagh Fort	Ringfort		Reerasta South	52°29′37″N 9°04′05″W	
378	Lackeen Castle	Castle		Abbeville	53°05′18″N 8°04′26″W	
124	Ahenny High Crosses	High Crosses		Ahenny	52°24′45″N 7°23′36″W	
396	St. Berrihert's Kyle	Crosses & Inscribed Slabs		Ardane	52°24′37″N 8°04′38″W	
604	Ardcroney Burial Mound	Burial Mound (Cist)		Ardcroney	52°56′17″N 8°09′26″W	
573	Ashleypark Burial Mound	Burial Moundy (Cist)		Ashleypark	52°56′02″N 8°11′20″W	
120	Athassel Abbey	Priory (Augustinian)		Cashel	52°28′46″N 7°59′01″W	
581	Ballycomisk Ringforts	Three Ringforts		Ballycomisk	52°29′22″N 7°50′27″W	
659	Ballingarry Warhouse	House with historical associations		Farranrory Upper	52°37′09″N 7°31′22″W	
234	Ballynahow Castle	Castle		Ballynahow	52°41′35″N 7°52′41″W	
123	Ballynoran Church	Church		Ballynoran	52°21′20″N 7°29′24″W	
370	Burncourt Castle	Castle or fortified house		Burncourt	52°18′55″N 8°04′14″W	
595	Cahir Abbey	Priory (Augustinian)		Caherabbey Upper	52°22′45″N 7°55′43″W	
507	Cahir Castle	Castle		Townparks	52°22′28″N 7°55′38″W	
577	Cahir Castle Cottage	Cahir Castle Cottage		Townparks	52°22′26″N 7°55′38″W	
647	Swiss Cottage	Cottage		Kilcommon Beg	52°21′26″N 7°55′25″W	
447	Carrick-on-Suir Castle	Castle		Carrick-on-Suir	52°20′42″N 7°24′25″W	
537	Rathanadav	Ringfort		Carron (St. Johnbaptist)	52°28′32″N 7°53′16″W	
550	Carron fort	Ringfort		Carron (Tipperary town)	52°29′37″N 8°10′48″W	
127	Hore Abbey	Abbey (Cistercian)		Cashel	52°31′07″N 7°53′52″W	
128	Rock of Cashel	Ecclesiastical site		Cashel	52°31′12″N 7°53′25″W	
667	Clonmel Main Guard	Courthouse		Burgagery-Lands West	52°21′11″N 7°42′05″W	
353	Timoney Hills Standing Stones	Standing Stones		Cullaun, Timenyhills, Timoney	52°54′01″N 7°43′12″W	
533	Derryvella	Early Medieval Ecclesiastical Site		Derryvella	52°37′05″N 7°40′09″W	
193	St. Dominic's Abbey	Abbey (Dominican)		St. Dominick's Abbey	52°31′05″N 7°53′16″W	
122	Donaghmore Church	Church		Donaghmore	52°24′47″N 7°43′29″W	
407	Grallagh Castle	Castle & Bawn		Grallagh (Graystown)	52°35′41″N 7°46′16″W	
121	Holy Cross Abbey	Abbey (Cistercian) (part of)		Holycross	52°38′22″N 7°52′05″W	
654	Kilcash Church	Church & graveyard		Kilcash	52°23′50″N 7°31′24″W	
654	Kilcash Castle	Castle		Kilcash	52°23′50″N 7°31′16″W	
218	Kilcooly Abbey	Abbey (Cistercian)		Kilcoolyabbey	52°40′15″N 7°34′16″W	
584	Knockgraffon	Motte & Bailey		Knockgraffon	52°24′44″N 7°55′59″W	
266	Liathmore Churches	Two Churches		Leigh	52°40′12″N 7°40′07″W	
348	Lismacrory Mounds	Mounds		Lismacrory	53°02′16″N 8°01′54″W	
524	Longstone Rath	Standing Stone & prehistoric earthworks		Longstone	52°30′22″N 8°17′52″W	
673	Lorrha Church	Church & two crosses		Lorrha	53°05′30″N 8°07′13″W	
357	Lorrha Priory	Priory (Augustinian)		Lorrha	53°05′31″N 8°07′17″W	
361	Lorrha Friary	Friary (Dominican)		Lorrha	53°05′28″N 8°07′34″W	
335	Derrynaflan Church	Church & Early Medieval Ecclesiastical site		Lurgoe	52°35′50″N 7°44′02″W	
125	Monaincha Church	Church & Cross		Monaincha	52°56′47″N 7°44′53″W	
292	Moor Abbey	Friary (Franciscan)		Moorabbey	52°24′09″N 8°16′42″W	
513	Nenagh Castle	Castle		Nenagh	52°51′54″N 8°11′53″W	
	Roscrea Friary	Friary (Franciscan)		Roscrea	52°57′09″N 7°47′59″W	
451	Portland Church	Church		Portland	53°05′24″N 8°10′32″W	
126	Roscrea Church	Church, Round Tower, High Cross & Mill		Roscrea	52°57′20″N 7°47′45″W	
211	Roscrea Castle	Castle		Roscrea	52°57′19″N 7°47′53″W	
548	Shrough Passage Tomb	Passage Tomb		Shrough	52°25′37″N 8°13′58″W	
363	Terryglass Castle	Castle		Terryglass	53°03′34″N 8°12′43″W	
332	Toureen Peakaun	Church, Crosses & Slabs		Toureen	52°24′32″N 7°59′36″W	
131	Ardmore Cathedral	Cathedral, Round Tower & Oratory		Ardocheasty	51°56′56″N 7°43′34″W	
384	Ballynageeragh Portal Tomb	Portal Tomb		Ballynageeragh	52°10′40″N 7°16′37″W	
330	Kiltera Ogham Stones	Ogham Stones		Dromore	52°04′28″N 7°50′56″W	
154	Drumlohan Souterrain and Ogham Stones	Souterrain & Ogham Stones		Drumlohan	52°09′48″N 7°27′55″W	
569	Dungarvan Castle	Castle		Dungarvan	52°05′21″N 7°36′58″W	
398	Gaulstown Portal Tomb	Portal Tomb		Gaulstown	52°12′21″N 7°12′38″W	
421	Knockeen Portal Tomb	Portal Tomb		Knockeen	52°12′26″N 7°09′34″W	
237	Matthewstown Passage Tomb	Passage Tomb		Matthewstown	52°10′33″N 7°13′38″W	
132	Mothel Abbey	Priory (Augustinian)		Mothel	52°17′54″N 7°25′07″W	
671	Double Tower	Town Defences		Waterford	52°15′23″N 7°06′43″W	
661	Reginald's Tower	Town Defences		Waterford	52°15′38″N 7°06′19″W	
205	French Church, Waterford	Friary Church (Franciscan)		Waterford	52°15′38″N 7°06′24″W	

== See also ==
- National Monument (Ireland)
