= List of national monuments in County Tipperary =

This is a list of national monuments in County Tipperary. In the Republic of Ireland, a structure or site may be deemed to be a "national monument", and therefore worthy of state protection, if it is of national importance. If the land adjoining the monument is essential to protect it, this land may also be protected.

== National monuments ==
NM#	Monument name	Description	Image	Townland	Location
378	Lackeen Castle	Castle		Abbeville	53°05′18″N 8°04′26″W
124	Ahenny High Crosses	High Crosses		Ahenny	52°24′45″N 7°23′36″W
396	St. Berrihert's Kyle	Crosses & Inscribed Slabs		Ardane	52°24′37″N 8°04′38″W
604	Ardcroney Burial Mound	Burial Mound (Cist)		Ardcroney	52°56′17″N 8°09′26″W
573	Ashleypark Burial Mound	Burial Moundy (Cist)		Ashleypark	52°56′02″N 8°11′20″W
120	Athassel Abbey	Priory (Augustinian)		Cashel	52°28′46″N 7°59′01″W
581	Ballycomisk Ringforts	Three Ringforts		Ballycomisk	52°29′22″N 7°50′27″W
659	Ballingarry Warhouse	House with historical associations		Farranrory Upper	52°37′09″N 7°31′22″W
234	Ballynahow Castle	Castle		Ballynahow	52°41′35″N 7°52′41″W
123	Ballynoran Church	Church		Ballynoran	52°21′20″N 7°29′24″W
370	Burncourt Castle	Castle or fortified house		Burncourt	52°18′55″N 8°04′14″W
595	Cahir Abbey	Priory (Augustinian)		Caherabbey Upper	52°22′45″N 7°55′43″W
507	Cahir Castle	Castle		Townparks	52°22′28″N 7°55′38″W
577	Cahir Castle Cottage	Cahir Castle Cottage		Townparks	52°22′26″N 7°55′38″W
647	Swiss Cottage	Cottage		Kilcommon Beg	52°21′26″N 7°55′25″W
447	Carrick-on-Suir Castle	Castle		Carrick-on-Suir	52°20′42″N 7°24′25″W
537	Rathanadav	Ringfort		Carron (St. Johnbaptist)	52°28′32″N 7°53′16″W
550	Carron fort	Ringfort		Carron (Tipperary town)	52°29′37″N 8°10′48″W
127	Hore Abbey	Abbey (Cistercian)		Cashel	52°31′07″N 7°53′52″W
128	Rock of Cashel	Ecclesiastical site		Cashel	52°31′12″N 7°53′25″W
667	Clonmel Main Guard	Courthouse		Burgagery-Lands West	52°21′11″N 7°42′05″W
353	Timoney Hills Standing Stones	Standing Stones		Cullaun, Timenyhills, Timoney	52°54′01″N 7°43′12″W
533	Derryvella	Early Medieval Ecclesiastical Site		Derryvella	52°37′05″N 7°40′09″W
193	St. Dominic's Abbey	Abbey (Dominican)		St. Dominick's Abbey	52°31′05″N 7°53′16″W
122	Donaghmore Church	Church		Donaghmore	52°24′47″N 7°43′29″W
407	Grallagh Castle	Castle & Bawn		Grallagh (Graystown)	52°35′41″N 7°46′16″W
121	Holy Cross Abbey	Abbey (Cistercian) (part of)		Holycross	52°38′22″N 7°52′05″W
654	Kilcash Church	Church & graveyard		Kilcash	52°23′50″N 7°31′24″W
654	Kilcash Castle	Castle		Kilcash	52°23′50″N 7°31′16″W
218	Kilcooly Abbey	Abbey (Cistercian)		Kilcoolyabbey	52°40′15″N 7°34′16″W
584	Knockgraffon	Motte & Bailey		Knockgraffon	52°24′44″N 7°55′59″W
266	Liathmore Churches	Two Churches		Leigh	52°40′12″N 7°40′07″W
348	Lismacrory Mounds	Mounds		Lismacrory	53°02′16″N 8°01′54″W
524	Longstone Rath	Standing Stone & prehistoric earthworks		Longstone	52°30′22″N 8°17′52″W
673	Lorrha Church	Church & two crosses		Lorrha	53°05′30″N 8°07′13″W
357	Lorrha Priory	Priory (Augustinian)		Lorrha	53°05′31″N 8°07′17″W
361	Lorrha Friary	Friary (Dominican)		Lorrha	53°05′28″N 8°07′34″W
335	Derrynaflan Church	Church & Early Medieval Ecclesiastical site		Lurgoe	52°35′50″N 7°44′02″W
125	Monaincha Church	Church & Cross		Monaincha	52°56′47″N 7°44′53″W
292	Moor Abbey	Friary (Franciscan)		Moorabbey	52°24′09″N 8°16′42″W
513	Nenagh Castle	Castle		Nenagh	52°51′54″N 8°11′53″W
	Roscrea Friary	Friary (Franciscan)		Roscrea	52°57′09″N 7°47′59″W
451	Portland Church	Church		Portland	53°05′24″N 8°10′32″W
126	Roscrea Church	Church, Round Tower, High Cross & Mill		Roscrea	52°57′20″N 7°47′45″W
211	Roscrea Castle	Castle		Roscrea	52°57′19″N 7°47′53″W
548	Shrough Passage Tomb	Passage Tomb		Shrough	52°25′37″N 8°13′58″W
363	Terryglass Castle	Castle		Terryglass	53°03′34″N 8°12′43″W
332	Toureen Peakaun	Church, Crosses & Slabs		Toureen	52°24′32″N 7°59′36″W

== Sources ==
- National Monuments in County Tipperary (North)
- National Monuments in County Tipperary (South)
