= List of monastic houses in County Tipperary =

Numerous Christian monasteries have existed in the territory that is now County Tipperary in Ireland, some founded in the Celtic Christian period and more after the reforms of Saint Malachy. The Reformation in Ireland saw the dissolution of the monasteries, but after the easing of the Penal Laws against Roman Catholicism new ones were opened.

The smaller establishments such as monastic cells and notable monastic granges (particularly those with resident monks) and camerae of the military orders of monks (Knights Templars and Knights Hospitallers) are included. The numerous monastic hospitals per se are not included here unless at some time the foundation had, or was purported to have, the status or function of an abbey, priory, or preceptory/commandery.

== Layout ==
Communities/provenance: shows the status and communities existing at each establishment, together with such dates as have been established as well as the fate of the establishment after dissolution, and the current status of the site.

Formal name or dedication: shows the formal name of the establishment or the person in whose name the church is dedicated, where known.

Alternative names: some of the establishments have had alternative names over the course of time. In order to assist in text-searching such alternatives in name or spelling have been provided.

== Abbreviations and key ==
The sites listed are ruins or fragmentary remains unless indicated thus:
*	current monastic function
+	current non-monastic ecclesiastic function
^	current non-ecclesiastic function
=	remains incorporated into later structure
#	no identifiable trace of the monastic foundation remains
~	exact site of monastic foundation unknown
ø	possibly no such monastic foundation at location
¤	no such monastic foundation
≈	identification ambiguous or confused

Locations with names in italics indicate probable duplication (misidentification with another location) or non-existent foundations (either erroneous reference or proposed foundation never implemented).

Trusteeship denoted as follows:
NIEA	Scheduled Monument (NI)
NM	National Monument (ROI)
C.I.	Church of Ireland
R.C.	Roman Catholic Church

Foundation	Image	Communities & provenance	Formal name or dedication & alternative names	References & location
Baptistgrange ^{~}		Crutched Friars (Augustinian rule) non-conventual grange of St John the Baptist's, Dublin; leased to the Countess of Ormond 1541	Athforth; Achadfada; Achfada	
Ardcrony Monastery		early monastic site, under coarbs	Ardcroine	52°56′05″N 8°09′19″W
Ardfinnan Monastery ^{#}		early monastic site, founded late 7th century? by St Finan Lobhar (Finan the Leper); burned by the Normans 1178 Franciscan Friars, Third Order Regular foundation and founder unknown; dissolved c.1542; occupancy by Robert Butler 1548	Ard-finain; Ard-fenan	52°17′58″N 7°53′42″W
Ardfinnan Preceptory? ^{#}		possibly Knights Templar, initially under Templetown; Knights Hospitaller, under Kilsaran founded 1212? (when church confirmed to the Hospitallers)	Ard-finain; Ard-fenan	
Athassel Priory		Augustinian Canons Regular founded 1192 (c.1200) by William de Burgo, confirmed by King John 1205; erroneously attributed as Trinitarian; (Note: cf Louis Augustin Alemand, Monasticum Hibernicum, translated and edited by John Stevens, 1722, p.150) held in commandam by Edmund Butler, Archbishop of Cashel; dissolved 1541; leased to Dermot Ryan; granted to Thomas, Earl of Ormond and Ossory 1557; (NM)	Priory of St Edmund, King and Martyr ____________________; Ath-an-tuisil; Ath-iseal; Ath-aysill; Hachassel; Hassel	52°28′45″N 7°59′00″W
Cahir Priory		Augustinian Canons Regular founded c.1200–1220 (during the reign of King John) by Galfrid de Camville; dissolved 1540; church parochial and conventual buildings occupied by Sir Thomas Butler by January 1541; priory alienated by William Hutchinson and Edward Walshe 1561; granted to Sir Edmond Butler 1566	St Mary ____________________; Caher; Cathair-duine-iascaid; Cahir-Dunesk; Cayrdunheach; Chaier	52°22′46″N 7°55′43″W
Carrick on Suir Priory		Franciscan nuns founded 1385?; dissolved 1542? house purportedly built on site, before 1603 (during the reign of Elizabeth I) by Thomas, 10th Earl of Ormond as principal residence for the earls of Ormond	Carrick-magriffin; Carrig-magriffin; Roche Swiry	52°20′39″N 7°25′00″W
Carrick on Suir Hospital Priory		Order of St Thomas of Acon founded c.1236 by William de Cantelo, with the consent of his wife Dionisia, confirmed by John de Norragh c.1250; dependent on Acon, London; dwellings leased to James White 1530; leased to Peter Butler, Earl of Ossory 1534 (Earl of Ormond from 1537); dissolved 1536?; granted to Thomas, Earl of Ormond	Hospital of St John the Evangelist	
Carrick on Suir — Mount St Nicholas Monastery				52°20′54″N 7°24′02″W
Carrick on Suir Hospitallers		Knights Hospitaller, frankhouse under the Hospital of Any, recorded 1541		
Cashel Monastery		early monastic site, foundation unknown; diocesan cathedral built 1101 or 1111 rebuilt 1169-72 by Domnall Mór O'Brien; rebuilt after c.1224	Caiseal; Caissel-narig	52°31′12″N 7°53′26″W
Cashel Priory		Benedictine monks dependent on Ratisbon; founded before 1134 at the instance of Dirmicius, Abbot of Ratisbon; St Cormac's probably the monks' chapel; expelled 1269-72 by David Mac Carwill, Archbishop of Cashel	St James	
Cashel Dominican Friary		Dominican Friars founded 1243 by David O'Kelly, a Dominican friar of Cork; burned accidentally; rebuilt and co-founded by John Cantwell 1480; partly leased by Prior Edward Brown 1535-6; dissolved 1540; surrendered by Prior Edward Brown 8 April 1540; leased to Peter Kelly and Walter Fleming; granted to Walter Fleming 1543-4; receiver Walter Houthe 1548; (NM)	St Dominic	52°31′05″N 7°53′16″W
Cashel Franciscan Friary ^{#}		Franciscan Friars Minor, Conventual; founded c.1265 (during the reign of Henry III) by Lord William Hacket; Observant Franciscan Friars reformed 1538; rented to Edmund Butler, Archbishop of Cashel, December 1538; dissolved 1540; surrendered by Diermit, guardian, 7 April 1540; friars apparently permitted to remain; abandoned due to religious persecution c.1550, a new house being provided for them 1618 (see immediately below); site now occupied by St John the Baptist R.C. parish church	'Hackett's Abbey'	52°30′59″N 7°53′04″W
Cashel Franciscan Friary, later site		Observant Franciscan Friars founded 1618		
Cashel Hospitallers		Knights Hospitaller frankhouse under the Hospital of Any, recorded 1541		
Cluain-conbruin Monastery ^{~≈?}		early monastic site, founded by St Abban	possibly Rathcoun (infra)	
Clonfinglass Monastery		early monastic site, founded by St Abban	Cluain-finndglaisse	52°27′30″N 8°04′24″W (?)
Clonmel Friary		Franciscan Friars Minor, Conventual founded 1269 by Otho de Grandison or the Geraldine family (the earls of Desmond), or by the townsmen of Clonmel; Observant Franciscan Friars reformed 1536; dissolved 1540, surrendered by Robert Travers, guardian, 8 March 1540; granted to the town 1541-2; later granted to James, Earl of Ormond reopened in 1827 on the original site		52°21′09″N 7°42′01″W
Clonmel White Friary		Carmelite Friars foundation unknown; dissolved c.1541, surrendered by the prior by April 1541; church found to be in parochial use; refounded by c.1737		
Clonmel Black Friary		Dominican Friars probably founded shortly before 1641; probably dissolved at the Cromwellian persecution; friars made an unsuccessful bid to return after the Restoration		
Clonoulty Preceptory		Knights Templar founded before 1200?, founder unknown; dissolved 1308-11; Knights Hospitaller	Clon-al; Clon-aul; Clonnell	52°36′16″N 7°57′28″W (approx?)
Colethe Grange ^{~}		Cistercian monks grange of Holycross, granted by Donal O'Brien	Cealuatair; Colethr; Cul-etu	
Coninga Monastery ^{~≈?}		early monastic site, founded by St Declan of Ardmore for some of his disciples; possibly located in County Tipperary	possibly Ardfinnan (supra)	
Corbally Priory		Augustinian Canons Regular — from Monaincha founded c.1485?; dissolved before 1585; granted to Sir Lucas Dillon 1585-6	SS Mary and Hilary; Holy Cross (from c.1485); St Mary (from 1486-7) ____________________; Corbhaile; Monaincha	52°56′52″N 7°46′25″W
Daire-mor Monastery		early monastic site, founded by mid 7th century	Doire-mor	52°36′32″N 7°38′39″W
Derrynavlan Monastery		early monastic site, founded before 800	Daire-edhnigh; Daire-eithne	52°34′21″N 7°42′28″W
Donaghmore Monastery		early monastic site, founded 6th century (during the time of St Colmcille and Ita) by Farannan, bishop	Domnach-mor-maige-femen	52°26′44″N 7°43′17″W (approx)
Donaghmore Monastery		early monastic site, probably founded by St Erc of Donaghmore, County Kildare	Killerk	52°24′47″N 7°43′30″W
Dromineer Monastery ^{ø}		purported intended foundation of monks, order unknown, which was never implemented; 12th century ruins		
St. Aibhe's Monastery, Emly ^{#}		early monastic site, founded 5th/6th century by St Ailbe; diocesan cathedral 1111 see united to Cashel 1562; secular college founded after 1505 and before 1542 by Bishop Thomas Hurley (dissolved c.1562); site currently occupied by St Ailbe's C.I. parish church	Imlech-Ibhair; Imblech-iobhair	52°27′47″N 8°21′06″W
Fethard Priory		Augustinian Friars founded 1306, site granted by Walter Mulcote; dissolved 1540; granted to Edmund Butler, Baron of Dunboyne 16 January 1544; ruins regained c.1820 new Augustinian house established in Fethard; nave restored for parochial use 19th century	Holy Trinity ____________________; Fiodh-ard; Fetherd; Fiard; Fyddert	52°27′58″N 7°41′26″W
Fethard Friary ^{ø}		listed in 1573 as Dominican Friars; (Note: Ex. Reg. (IV, p.39) Mag. — no other record found) — evidence lacking		
Galbally Friary		Franciscan Friars Minor, Conventual founded 1471 by O'Brien; plundered 1472; Observant Franciscan Friars reformed c.1536?; officially suppressed 1540; granted to John, brother of the Earl of Desmond 1543-4, friars permitted to remain; dissolved 1570; (NM)	Gallbhaile-eatharlach; Mowre; Moor Abbey	52°24′09″N 8°16′41″W
Glenkeen Monastery ^{≈?}		early monastic site, founded 5th century by St Patrick (if Glenshaoin) or St Culan (if in the valley of Glean-chaoin)	Glean-chaoin; Glenn-chaoin	52°46′01″N 8°01′13″W (approx?)
Holy Cross Abbey ^{+}		early monastic site, purportedly hermit monks in the woods; Benedictine monks? possibly founded 1169? by Donal (Mor) O'Brien, King of Limerick; Cistercian monks — from Monasteranenagh founded 1180; subject to Furness 1249; subject to Monasteranenagh 1278; subject to Mellifont 1289; erroneously given as Tironensian; (Note: Monasticon (1846) v. 150;) dissolved 1540; granted to Thomas, Earl of Ormond during the reign of Queen Mary, confirmed after 1558 by Elizabeth I; granted to Gerald, Earl of Ormond, 1563; monks permitted to remain in the abbey or the vicinity; in use as secular college 1540, probably until accession of Queen Mary 1553; became ruinous; restored for worship 1971-75; (NM)	Holycross; Monaster-na-croiche-naoimhe; Sancta Crux; Oterlaun; Wochturlawyn;	52°38′21″N 7°52′05″W
Hore Abbey		Cistercian monks — from Mellifont refounded 1272 by David Mac Carwill, Archbishop of Cashel; dissolved 1540, surrendered by Abbot Patrick Stackbold; leased to Sir Henry Radcliffe 1561		52°31′07″N 7°53′53″W
Ibracense Monastery ^{~}		order unknown, founded 1127 or soon after by St Malachy for brethren from Ulster; possibly located in County Tipperary		
Inishlounaght Abbey		early monastic site, founded before 656 by St Pulcherius; Cistercian monks — probably from Mellifont founded 1147-8 (before May 1148); dependent on Monateranenagh from 1151; dissolved 1540; granted to Cormac M'Teigh M'Carthy	Inis-leamhnachta; Inis-lannaught; Suir; de Surio	52°20′43″N 7°44′38″W
Inishlounaght Nunnery		Cistercian? nuns purported house adjoining the Cistercian monks' abbey (see immediately above); foundation and status unknown; dissolved 1228 by Stephen of Lexington		
Kilbarron Monastery		"ruins", (Note: Ordnance Survey) traditionally monastic — evidence lacking		52°58′37″N 8°15′45″W
Kilcash Monastery		early monastic site, founded by St Colman ua hEirc?	Cell-caisi	52°23′50″N 7°31′24″W
Kilclispeen Monastery		early monastic site; decorated high crosses remain	Cell-clispin; Kilklispeen	52°24′45″N 7°23′36″W
Kilcommon Priory		Benedictine monks dependent on Glastonbury, Somerset; founded c.1200 by Philip of Worcester; dissolved c.1332?, probably abandoned following Glastonbury's loss of property in Ireland	SS Philip, James and Armin (Cumin) ____________________; Kil-comin; Kil-cumin	52°20′52″N 7°55′06″W
Kilcooly Abbey		possibly Benedictine monks founded c.1182, site granted to the coarb of Mag Airb by Donal Mor O'Brien; Cistercian monks — from Jerpoint (re?)founded 1184, confirmed by Henry III; dissolved 1540, surrendered by Abbot Thomas Shortall 8 April 1540; church was found to be in parochial use 11 January 1541; occupier James, Earl of Ormond; (NM)	St Mary the Virgin and St Benedict; St Mary (confirmation of Henry III) ____________________; Albicamp; de Arvi Campo; Arvicampus; Kil-cuile; Kil-coul; Kyllecouill	52°40′09″N 7°33′29″W
Kilkeary Monastery		early monastic site, nuns, founded before 679; mistaken for Kilcrea, County Cork (Note: Colgan and Mervyn Archdall, Monasticon Hibernicum, 1786, p.72)	Cell-cere	52°49′58″N 8°07′25″W
Killalie Friary ^{≈}	Franciscan Friars, Third Order Regular — actually Killeenagalive, infra			
Killeennagallive Friary		Franciscan Friars, Third Order Regular founded before 1461; dissolved 1543, possibly abandoned during persecution; Franciscan Friars Minor, Conventual founded after 1543; dissolved during the reign of Elizabeth I?	Killin-ndeallubh; Killin-enallagh; Killin-nandealbh; Killalowe; Kyllalie; Templebredon	52°30′08″N 8°21′11″W (approx)
Kilmore Monastery		early monastic site	Cell-mor-aradtire	52°48′38″N 8°13′51″W
Lady's Abbey		Carmelite nuns founded after 1314?; dissolved c.1541?	Mainister-Mhuire; Ardfinnan	
Latteragh Monastery		early monastic site	Leatharach; Leitrioch-odrain; Leitreach-odrain; Lettir-odrain; Lattracha	52°48′17″N 8°02′07″W
Leamakevoge Monastery		early monastic site, founded by St Mochemoc (Pulcherius); also erroneously given as County Offaly, by confusion with Manchán of Lemanaghan (Note: Mervyn Archdall, Monasticon Hibernicum, 1786, p.402)	Liath-mochoemocc; Liath-mor; Leighmore; Lethmor; Liethmor	52°40′17″N 7°42′50″W ?
Lemdruim Monastery ^{~}		early monastic site; also given as Lorum, County Carlow (Note: Petrie, p.40)		
Lorrha Monastery		early monastic site, founded before 558 by St Brendan; refounded before 584 by St Ruadhan; burned by the Norsemen 845; church built on site c.1000, ruins remain		53°05′29″N 8°07′12″W
Lorrha Priory ^{#}		Augustinian Canons Regular founded after 1140?, on the site of the earlier monastery (see immediately above), apparently built to the north of the earlier monastic church; burned 1157 and 1179; transferred [sic] to new site, adjacent (see immediately below); church in parochial use; became ruinous; 19th-century C.I. parish church built adjacent	St Rogan / St Ruadan ____________________; Lothea; Loghera; Lorrah; Lurchoe; de Fontis Vivi de Lochra; Lothor	53°05′31″N 8°07′16″W
Lorrha Priory of St Ruadán		Augustinian Canons Regular founded at earlier site (see immediately above) c.1140, dissolved c.1578?; lease granted to John Hogan, former prior, 2 June 1552, who possibly allowed the Canons to remain; Augustinian Friars founded c.1643		53°05′31″N 8°07′16″W
Lorrha Friary		Dominican Friars founded 1269 by Walter de Burgo, Earl of Ulster; dissolved 1552; lease granted to John Hogan, former prior of the Augustinian Priory, 2 June 1552 erroneously shown as "Franciscan Abbey (in ruins)" on Ordnance Survey	St Peter, Martyr	53°05′28″N 8°07′33″W
Lorrha Abbey		suggested Benedictine monks (Note: Louis Augustin Alemand, Monasticum Hibernicum, translated and edited by John Stevens, 1722, pp.71-72) founded by St Deicola? (Deicolus?)		
Molough Priory		early monastic site, nuns, abbey? founded late 5th century; Augustinian nuns priory, founded 14th century? by the Butler family; dissolved 1540, surrendered by Prioress Joan Powere, 11 April 1540; granted to Robert Butler c.1540; church found to be in parochial use 1541; leased to Sir Henry Ratcliff 1576	St Brigid ____________________; Molaca-Brigde; Mainistir-Brigde; Mag-lacha; Moillagh; Mollaghe; Moylagh	52°16′47″N 7°48′02″W
Monaincha Priory		early monastic site, Culdees hermits founded 6th century; existing in the time of St Cainnech of Aghaboe; Culdees moved to the chapel of St Colum on the arrival of the Augustinians; Augustinian Canons Regular founded after 1140; dissolved c.1485?, transferred to Corbally; Augustinian Friars	St Hilary; St Mary (from c.1400?); Holy Cross (from 18 April 1485) ____________________; Mona Incha; Inis-locha-cré; Inis-na-mBeo; Loch-cré; Inchinemeo; Cree-stagnum; Inchanames; Kilbar [sic.]	52°56′47″N 7°44′53″W
Nenagh Friary		Franciscan Friars founded 13th century (during the reign of Henry III) by a Kennedy (possibly L. O'Kennedy) or a Butler dissolved before 1587; granted on lease to Robert Collum (Collam) 1587	Aonagh-urmumam; Oinach-urmumam; Enagh; Lenaenach; Venath	52°51′46″N 8°11′48″W
Nenagh — Tyone Priory Hospital		Fratres Cruciferi under Augustinian Canons Regular founded c.1200 by Theobald Walter, Pincerna of Ireland; burned by O'Kennedy 1342 became secular 1541-2, dependent on St John's, Dublin; dissolved 1551; granted to Oliver Grace 1563	St John the Baptist ____________________; Tyone Priory	52°51′19″N 8°11′03″W
Rathcoun Monastery		"Site of monastery", supposed friary (Note: Ordnance Survey Letters, O'Donovan and others (Royal Irish Academy))		52°29′56″N 7°55′19″W
Rathronan Camera		Knights Templar founded 13th century; dissolved 1308; Knights Hospitaller		52°23′09″N 7°42′02″W ?
Roscrea Friary		Franciscan Friars Minor, Conventual founded before 1477; Observant Franciscan Friars reformed c.1490; dissolved c.1579, destroyed by the Protestants, friars fled; granted to the Earl of Thomond c.1568, assigned to William Crow	Ros-cré; Ruiscre	52°57′09″N 7°47′59″W
Roscrea Monastery		founded 7th century by St Cronan; Augustinian Canons founded c.1140, canons possibly introduced by St Malachy 1140-8; diocesan cathedral 1152; became parochial apparently c.1195 when diocese united to Killaloe		52°57′20″N 7°47′44″W
St Peakaun Monastery		early monastic site, possibly founded before the time of Becan; (re?)founded by St Abban	Cluain-ard-mobecoc; Kilpeacon; Pekaun	52°24′32″N 7°59′35″W
Senros Monastery		early monastic site	Sean Ros nr Monaincha	
Shanrahan Monastery		early monastic site, possibly founded before c.637 by St Cataldus	Sean-raithin	52°16′23″N 8°00′52″W
Templemore Abbey		Knights Templar, stationed here, purportedly occupying the castle		52°47′50″N 7°50′26″W
Terryglass Monastery		early monastic site, founded before 549 by St Colum "Mac Cremthainn"; burned 1112 and 1164	Tir-da-glas; Tir	53°03′17″N 8°12′16″W
Thurles Friary		Carmelite Friars founded c.1291-1300 by the Butler family; dissolved 1540, when already ruinous; granted to Thomas, Earl of Ormond and Ossory 1557, friars remaining in the vicinity; listed as a restored convent existing c.1737		52°40′49″N 7°48′32″W
Thurles Greyfriars		Franciscan Friars probable post-medieval establishment		
Thurles Preceptory		purported Knights Templar, who occupied the castle, with another fortress ascribed to them traditionally Knights Hospitaller		
Tipperary Friary		Augustinian Friars founded c.1300?, possibly by Stephen Butler; dissolved 1539, surrendered by Prior Donough O'Cuyrke (O'Quirk) 7 April 1539, by which time ruinous; granted to Dermot Ryan of Tipperary 1541	Tiobrain-arann; Tioprat-arann; Tipra-arann; Tiperary	52°28′20″N 8°09′38″W
Toomyvara Priory		early monastic site, purportedly founded 6th or 7th/8th century by St Donan 407; Augustinian Canons Regular priory cell, dependent on Monaincha; founded 1140; dissolved before 1585; granted to Milned Magrath, Archbishop of Cashel, 30 December 1585	St Donan; St Mary ____________________; Tuaim-ui-mheadhra; Thomedonyn; Tamdonayn; Theym; Toem; Toome	52°50′59″N 8°02′07″W
Tullamain Monastery		early monastic site; plundered 1026		52°28′06″N 7°46′55″W

== Map link to lists of monastic houses in Ireland by county ==
Click on a county to go to the corresponding article.	Antrim; Armagh; Down; Fermanagh; Londonderry; Tyrone; Carlow; Cavan; Clare; Cork; Donegal; Dublin; Galway; Kerry; Kildare; Kilkenny; Laois; Leitrim; Limerick; Longford; Louth; Mayo; Meath; Monaghan; Offaly; Roscommon; Sligo; Tipperary; Waterford; Westmeath; Wexford; Wicklow

== See also ==
- List of monastic houses in Ireland
