= Dunloe Ogham Stones =

Collection of ogham stones in County Kerry, Ireland

- Clocha Oghaim Dhún Lóich (Irish)
- The Beaufort Stones
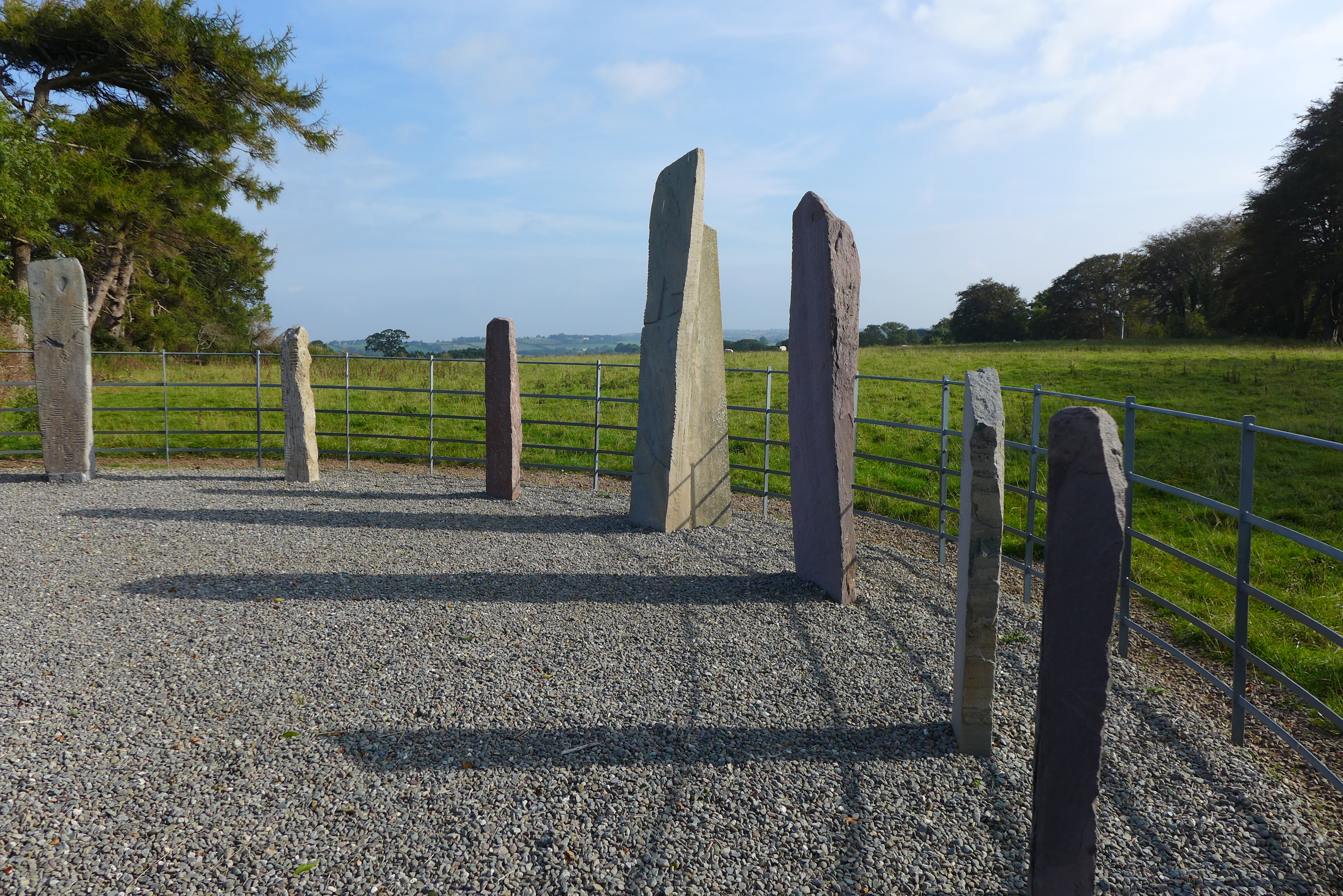

- Location within Ireland
- 52.060410°N 9.634788°W
- Type: ogham stones
- Location: Coolmagort, Beaufort, County Kerry, Ireland

Site notes
- Elevation: 51 m (167 ft)
- Owner: state

National monument of Ireland
- Official name: Dunloe Ogham Stones
- Reference no.: 385

Dunloe Ogham Stones (CIIC 197–203, 241) is a collection of ogham stones forming a National Monument located in County Kerry, Ireland.

== Location ==
Dunloe Ogham Stones are located 1 km south of Beaufort, to the south of the River Laune.

== History ==
The stones were carved in the 5th and 6th centuries AD and served as burial markers. Seven were discovered in 1838 forming the ceiling of a souterrain near Dunloe Castle and were moved to their current site by 1945. Another stone comes from the old church of Kilbonane.

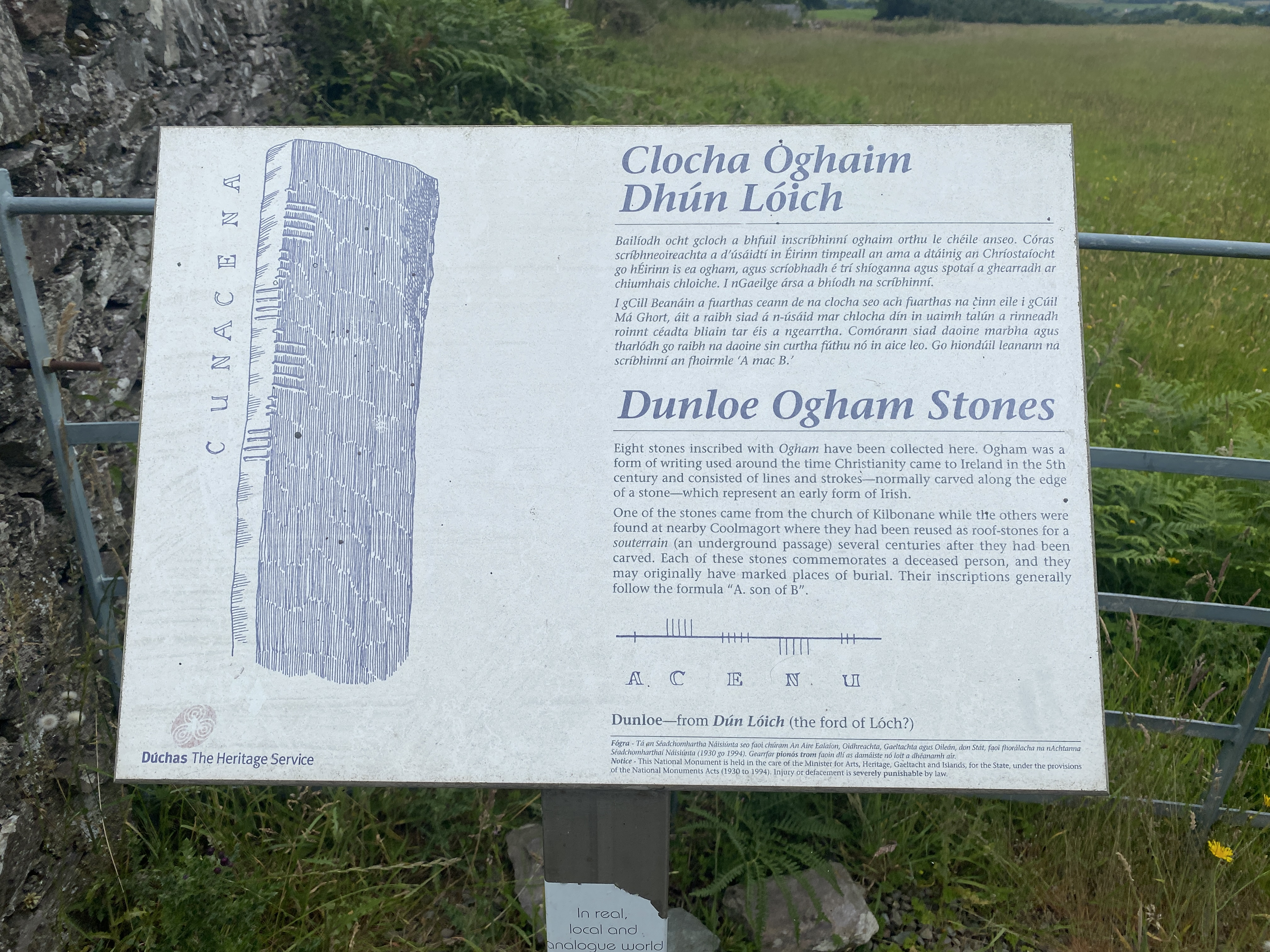
Dunloe Ogham Stones signage

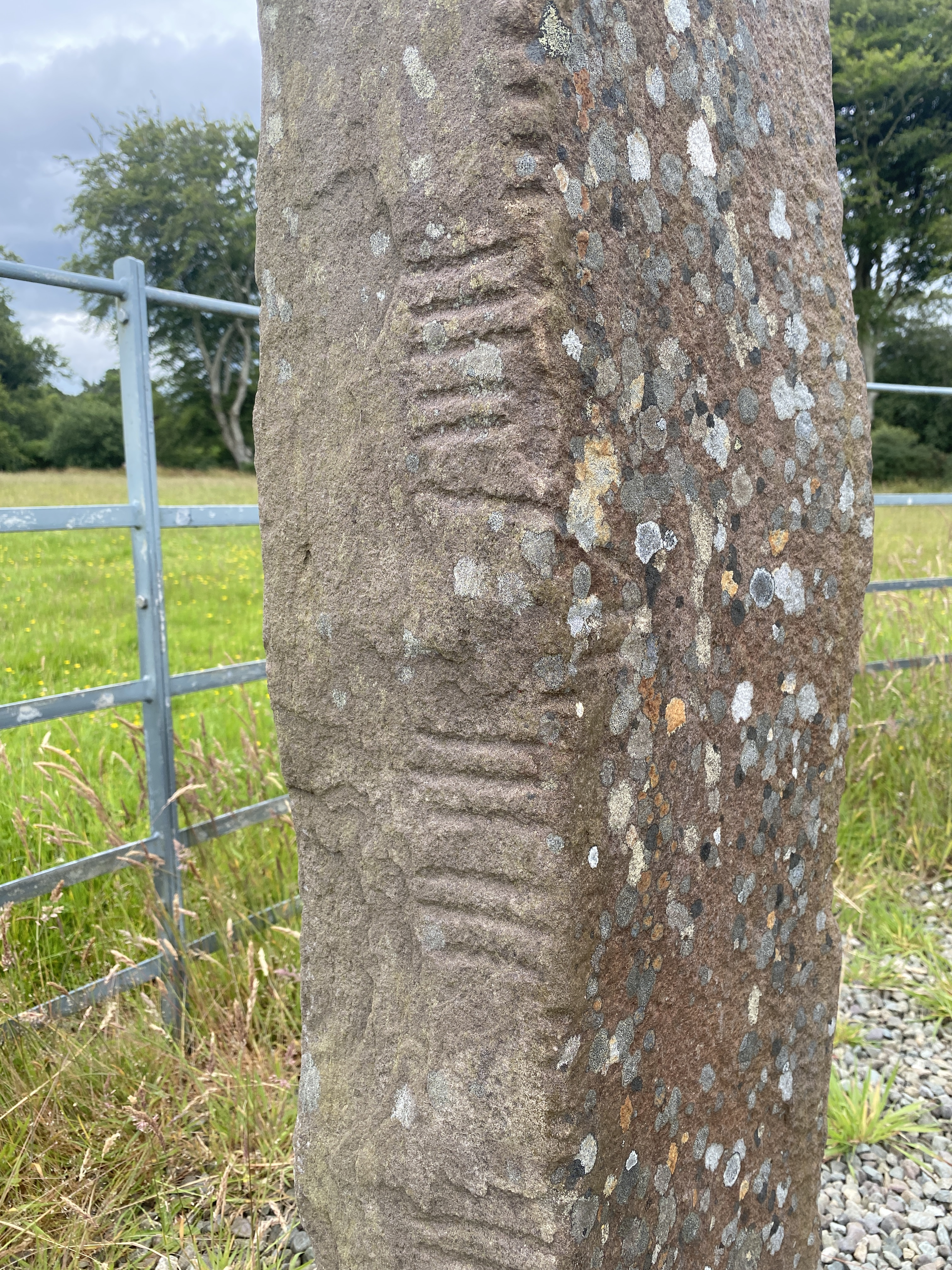
Detail of ogham in Dunloe Ogham site

== Description ==
The Kilbonane stone is in the centre (CIIC 241) and the others are arranged around it.

- CIIC 197: DEGO{S} MAQI MOCOI TOICAKI ("of Daig son of the descendant of Toicacas"; believed to refer to the Tóecraige tribe)
- CIIC 198: MAQI-RITEAS MAQI MAQI-DDUMILEAS/ MUCOI TOICACI ("of Mac-Rithe son of Mac-Duimle descendant of Toicacas"; believed to refer to the Tóecraige tribe)
- CIIC 199: CUNACENA ("of Conchenn"; the name means "dog-head")
- CIIC 200: MAQI-TTAL MAQI VORGOS MA/QI MU/COI TOICAC ("of Mac-Táil son of Fuirg descendant of Toicacas"; believed to refer to the Tóecraige tribe)

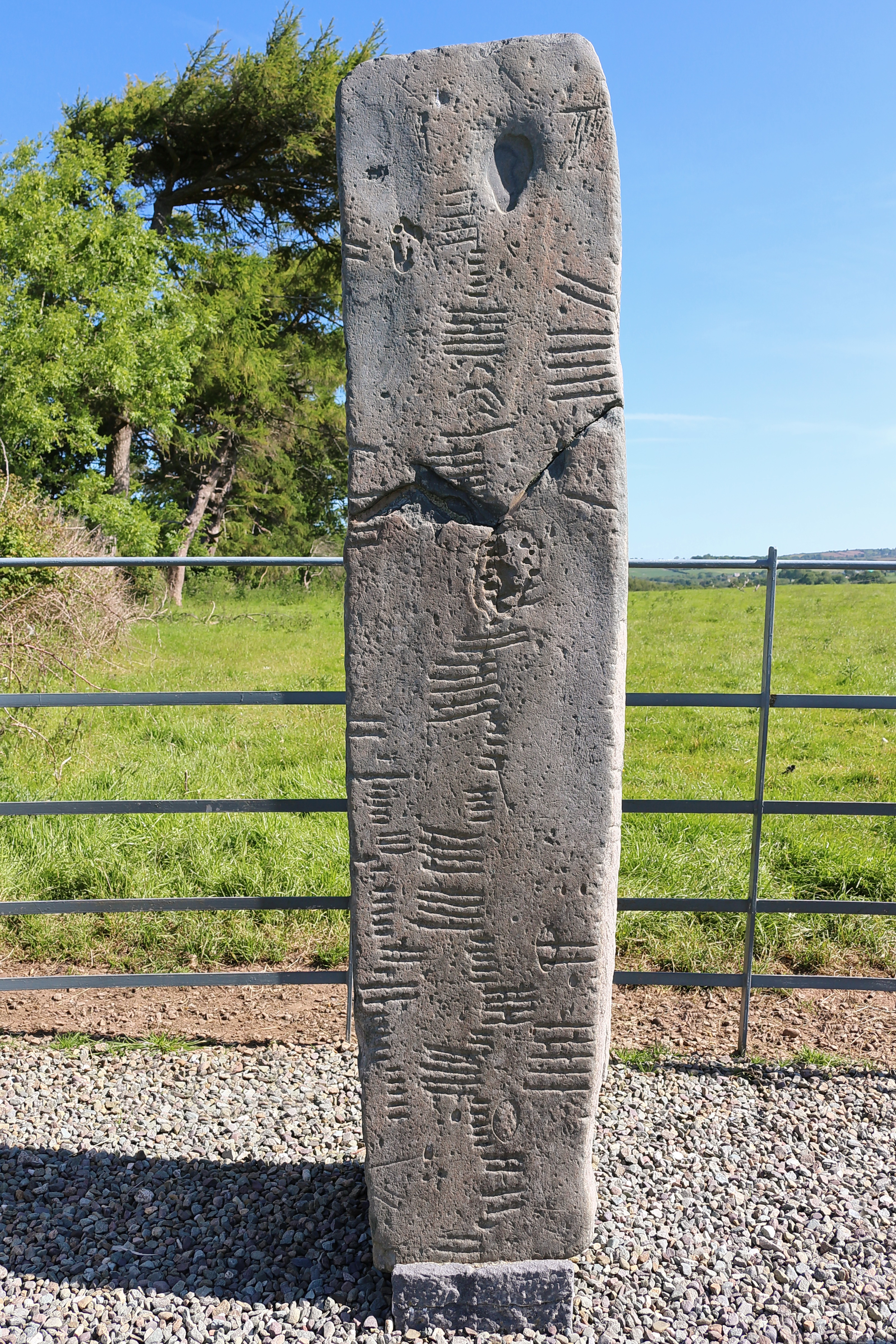
Dunloe Stone CIIC 241

- CIIC 201: ... ṂC̣ ... G̣Ẹ?̣ ... / Ṃ[A(?)]Q̣ ... Ḍ/ ... Ẹ?̣ ... (badly faded)
- CIIC 202: NIỌTTVRẸCC MAQỊ/ ... G̣NỊ ("of Nad-Froích son of ?-án"; Nad-Froích means "heather's champion")
- CIIC 203: MAQI-DECEDA MAQ̣[I] ("of Mac-Deichet son of ..."; believed to refer to the Tóecraige tribe)
- CIIC 241: B[AID(?)]AGNỊ ṂAQ̣I ADDỊLONA; NAGỤN[I(?)] M[U(?)]C̣[O(?)] B[AI(?)]D[A]N[I(?)]; NIR[???]MṆ[I]DAGNIESSICONIDDALA/ AMIT BAIDAGNI
