= Ashleypark =

Ashleypark Irish: Páirc Ashley
- Townland
- Location in Ireland
- Coordinates: 52°56′12″N 8°09′15″W
- Country: Ireland
- Province: Munster
- County: Tipperary

Ashleypark (Páirc Ashley in Irish) is a townland in the historical Barony of Ormond Upper, County Tipperary, Ireland.

== Location ==
The townland is located to the south-east of Ardcroney on the N52 road north of Nenagh. Lough Ourna is within the townland.

== Buildings of note ==
Ashley Park House, a 19th-century house is located overlooking the lough. It is listed on the National Inventory of Architectural Heritage as being of special architectural and artistic interest. The three arched gate on the N52 is listed separately. A burial mound is located 1 km north of Ashleypark House. A crannog, a ringfort and ruined castle are recorded in Lough Ourna.
