= Carron fort =

Ringfort in County Tipperary, Ireland

- Ráth an Charainn (Irish)
- Location within Ireland
- 52.493446°N 8.179824°W
- Type: ringfort
- Periods: Bronze or Iron Age (c. 2400 BC – AD 400)
- Location: Carron, County Tipperary, Ireland

Site notes
- Material: earth
- Elevation: 108 m (354 ft)
- Diameter: 75 m (246 ft)
- Owner: private

National monument of Ireland
- Official name: Carron
- Reference no.: 550

Carron fort is a ringfort (rath) and National Monument located in County Tipperary, Ireland.

== Location ==
Carron fort is located 1 mi (1.6 km) east of Limerick Junction.

== Description ==
Carron fort is a trivallate rath.
