= Lismacrory Mounds =

- Dumhaí Lios Mhic Ruairí (Irish)
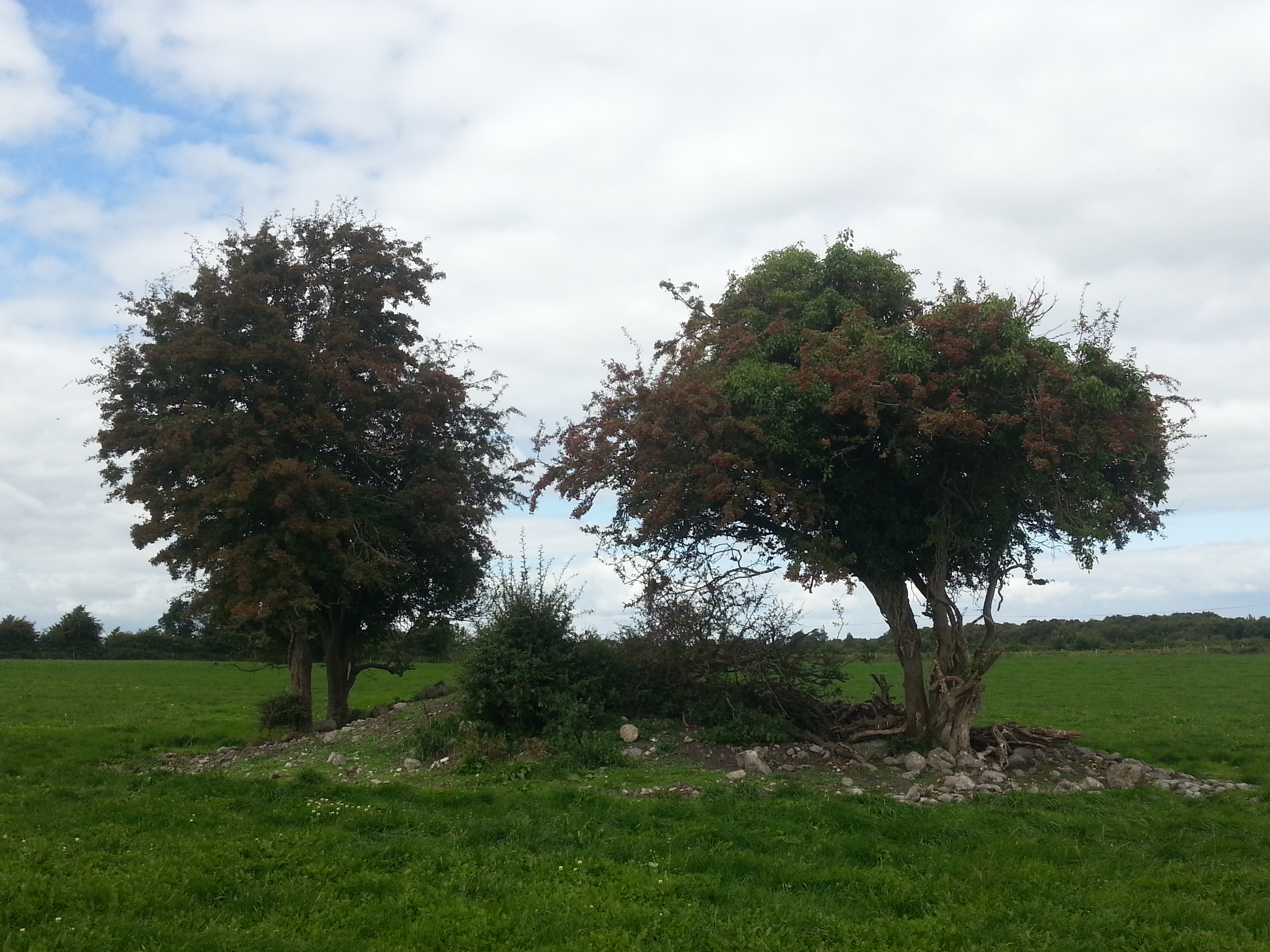
- Main ringfort

- Location within Ireland
- 53.037778°N 8.031667°W
- Type: cairns
- Periods: Bronze or Iron Age (c. 2400 BC – AD 400)
- Location: Lismacrory, Roscrea, County Tipperary, Ireland
- Region: Shannon Valley

Site notes
- Material: stone, earth
- Elevation: 85 m (279 ft)

National monument of Ireland
- Official name: Lismacrory Mounds
- Reference no.: 348

Lismacrory Mounds are a group of prehistoric mounds forming a National Monument in County Tipperary, Ireland. They are 2.2 km (1.4 mi) north of Ballingarry, North Tipperary, 10 km (6.3 mi) southeast of Lough Derg.

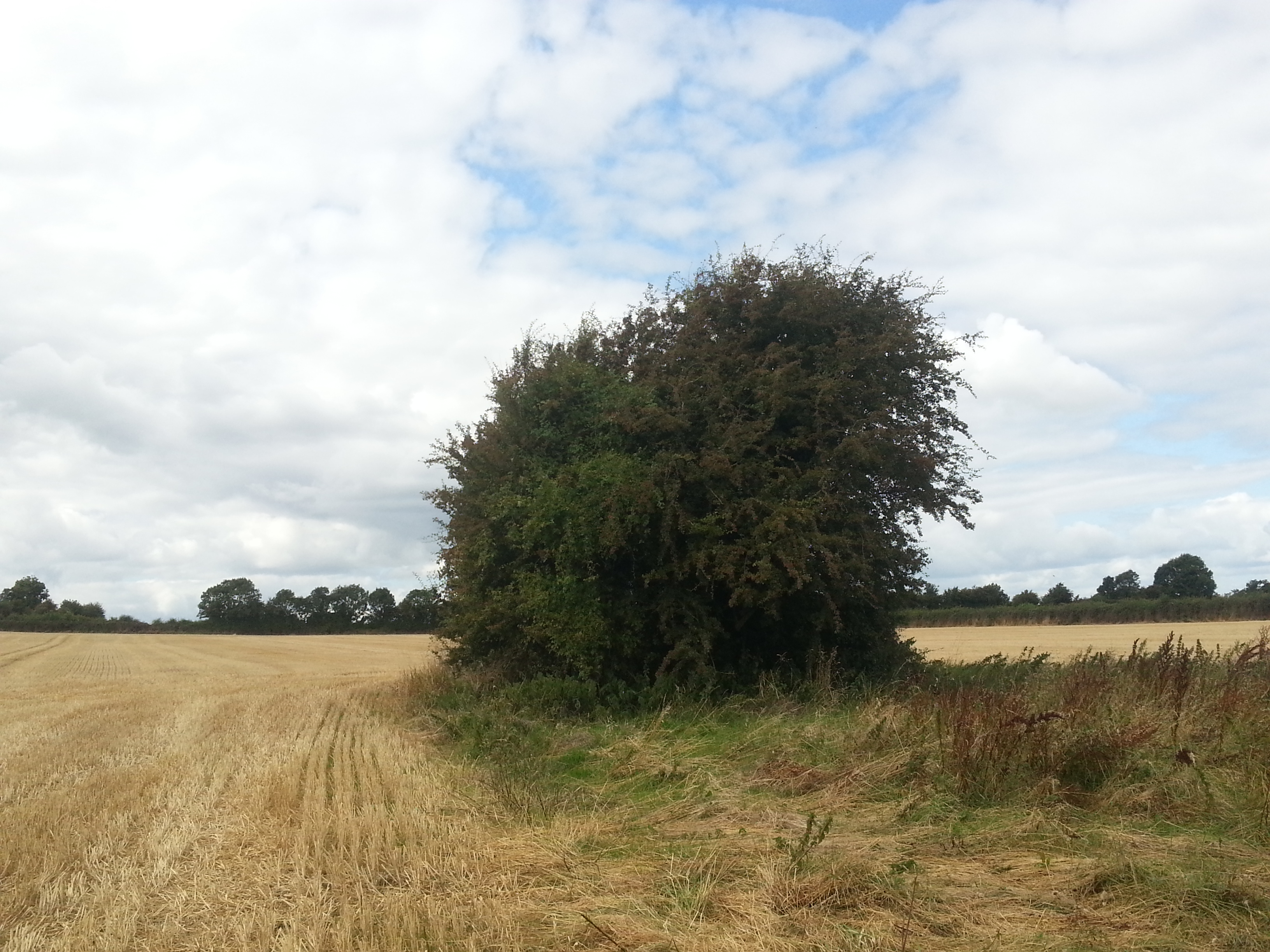
Another view of the main ringfort.

There are about 20 mounds, or cairns, in the area. They were originally assumed to be burial sites, but are now thought to be piles of stones discarded from fulachtaí fia. Other structures identified in the area include ringforts, dwellings and enclosure sites.
