= Lackeen Castle =

- Caisleán Leac Fhinn (Irish)
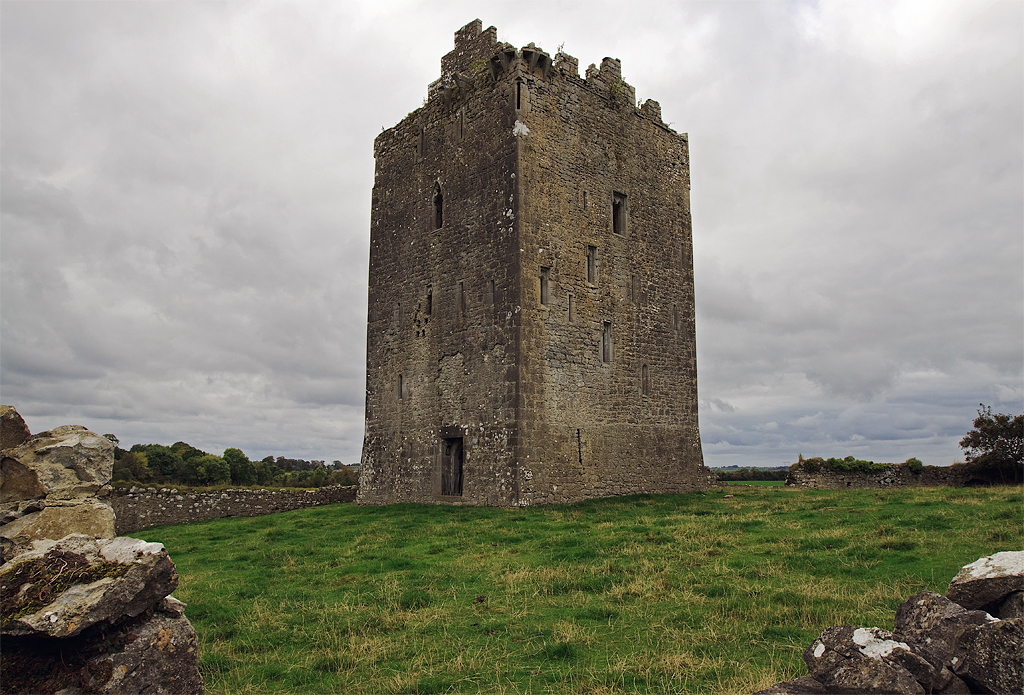
- Tower house at Lackeen, County Tipperary

- Location within Ireland
- 53.0886°N 8.0739°W
- Type: Tower house
- Location: Abbeville, Lorrha; County Tipperary, Ireland

History
- Built: 16th century

Site notes
- Architectural style: Norman

National monument of Ireland
- Official name: Lackeen Castle
- Reference no.: 378

Lackeen Castle, a tower house within a bawn built in the 12th century as a Kennedy stronghold (rebuilt in the 16th century). The castle is a national monument in state ownership and is located in the townland of Abbeville near to Lorrha in County Tipperary, Ireland. It is occasionally open to the public. Close by, stands Lackeen House dating from around 1730.

== Lorrha Missal ==
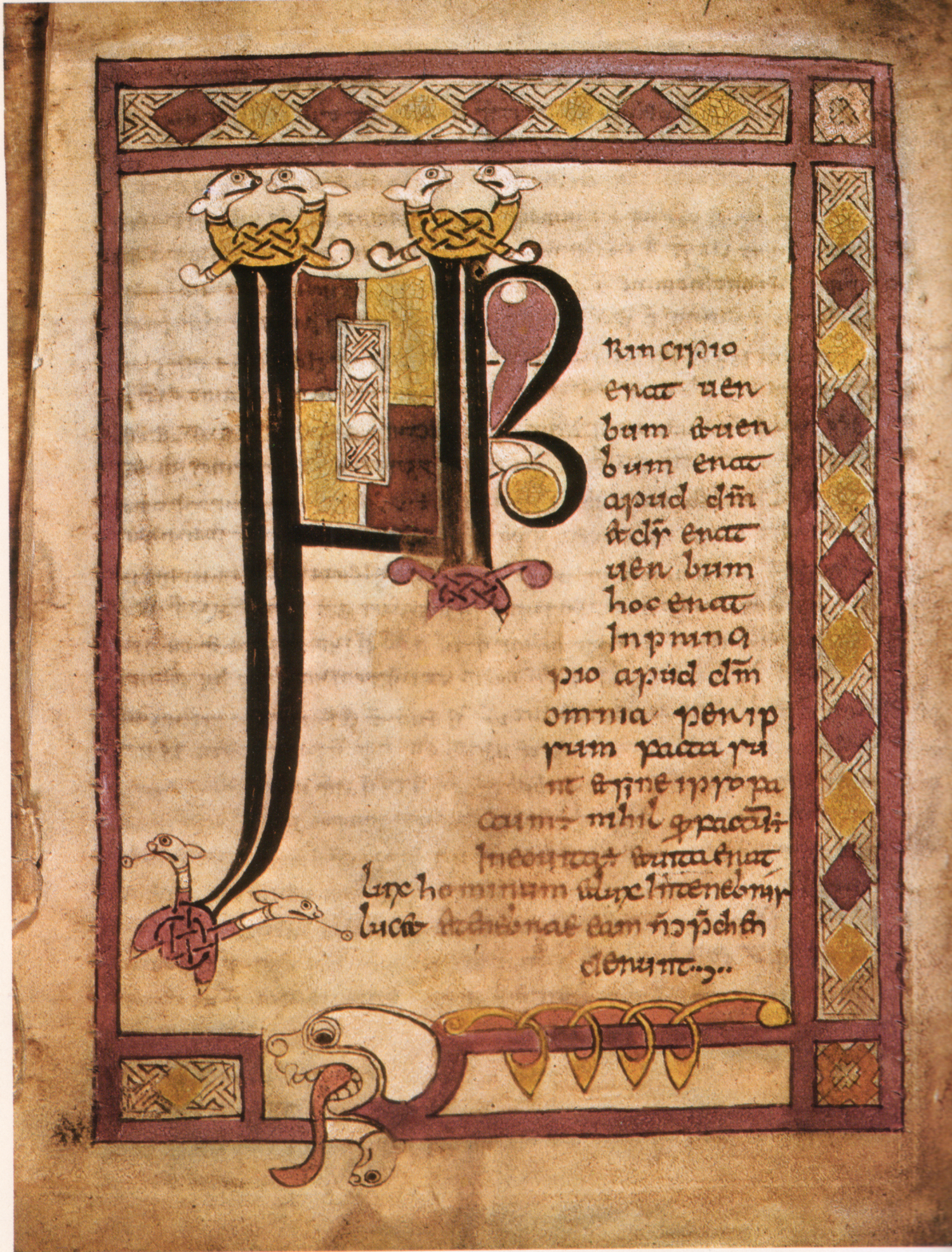
Stowe Missal folio 1r initial page

It was at Lackeen Castle that the Lorrha Missal, which is strictly speaking a sacramentary rather than a missal, was found. An Irish illuminated manuscript written mainly in Latin with some Gaelic in the late eighth or early ninth century, probably after 792. In the mid-11th century it was annotated and some pages rewritten at Lorrha Monastery. It is also known as the "Stowe" Missal as it once belonged to the Stowe manuscripts collection formed by George Nugent-Temple-Grenville, 1st Marquess of Buckingham at Stowe House. When the collection was bought by the nation in 1883, it and the other Irish manuscripts were handed over to the Royal Irish Academy in Dublin, where it remains, catalogued as MS D II 3. The cumdach or reliquary case which up to this point had survived together with the book was later transferred, with the rest of the Academy's collection of antiquities, to the National Museum of Ireland (museum number 1883, 614a). The old story was that the manuscript and shrine left Ireland after about 1375, as they were collected on the Continent in the 18th century, but this appears to be incorrect, as they were found here at Lackeen Castle in the 18th century.
