= Shrough Passage Tomb =

- Tuama Pasáiste Shruth na Gamhnaí (Irish)
- Location within Ireland
- 52.426920°N 8.232801°W
- Type: passage grave
- Location: Shrough, Bruis, County Tipperary, Ireland

History
- Built: c. 3000 BC

Site notes
- Elevation: 370 m (1,210 ft)

National monument of Ireland
- Official name: Shrough
- Reference no.: 548

Shrough Passage Tomb (/ˈʃruː/) is a passage grave and National Monument located atop Slievenamuck, County Tipperary, Ireland.

== Location ==
Shrough Passage Tomb is located atop Slievenamuck, near the source of the River Ara and halfway between Tipperary Town and Galbally, County Limerick. This is far from the main centres of passage grave construction.

== History ==
Shrough passage tomb was built c. 3000 BC.

== Description ==
Shrough Passage Tomb's entrance is formed with two orthostats on each side defining an area 3 m × 1.5 m (9.8 ft × 4.9 ft). The chamber is about 1.5 m x 1.2 m and is roofless. The chamber stands near the centre of a low, roughly circular mound, 30 m (98 ft) across. Many megalithic monuments are aligned towards mountains and celestial events; the entrance chamber at Shrough points roughly towards Slievenamon and the area of sunrise at equinox.
