= Donaghmore, County Tipperary =

Civil parish in County Tipperary, Ireland

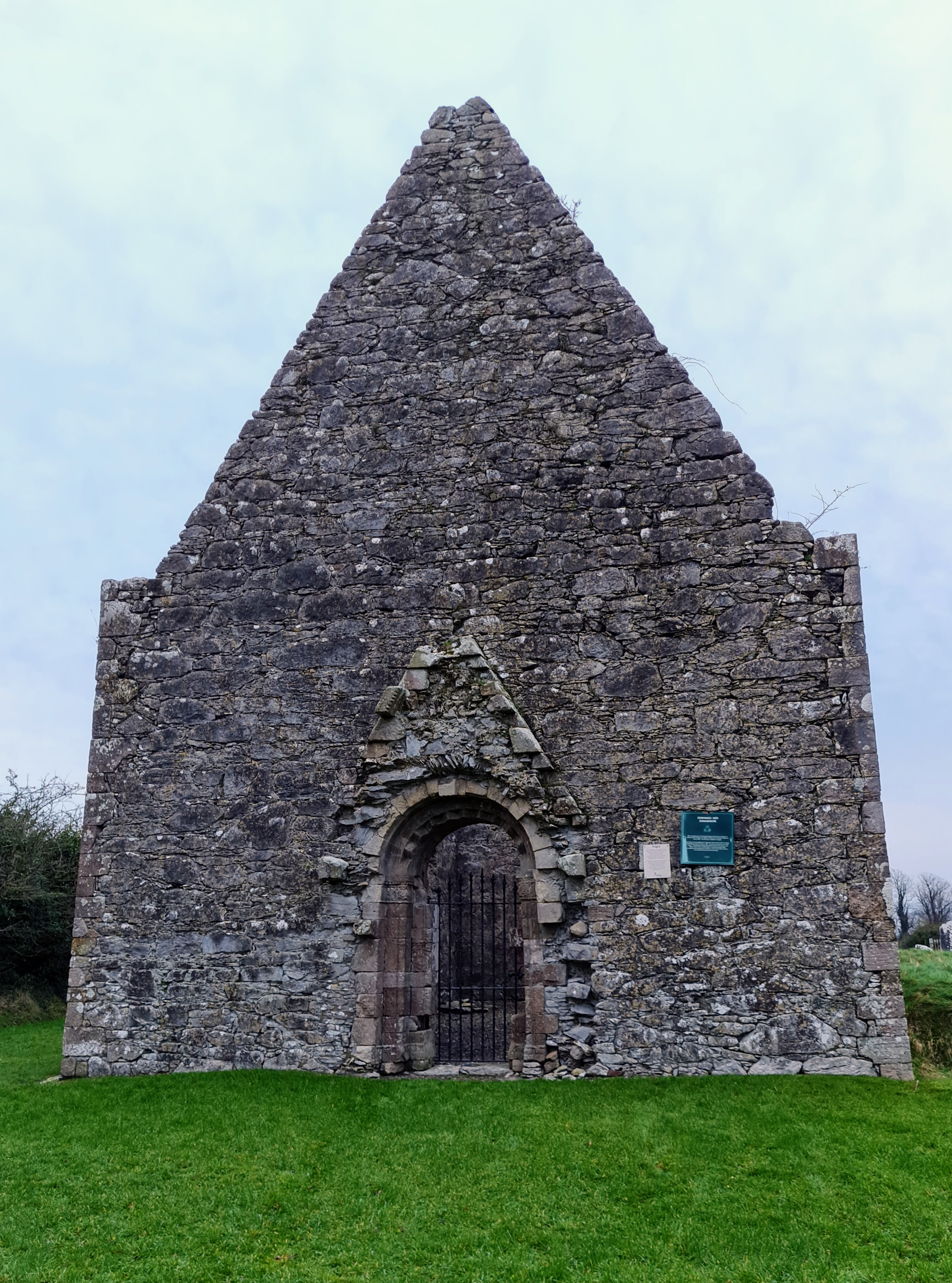
Donaghmore Church

Donaghmore, (Irish: Domhnach Mór, meaning 'big church'), near Lisronagh, County Tipperary, Ireland, is a townland and civil parish. It is the site of the ruins of St. Farannan's Church, which date from the 12th century.
