= Portland Church =

- Eaglais Phort Tulcháin (Irish)
- Location within Ireland
- 53.09007°N 8.175483°W
- Type: church
- Location: Portland, Lorrha, County Tipperary, Ireland

History
- Built: 11th/12th century AD

Site notes
- Elevation: 55 m (180 ft)
- Architectural style: Romanesque

National monument of Ireland
- Official name: Portland Church
- Reference no.: 451

Portland Church is an ancient church located in County Tipperary, Ireland.

== Location ==
Portland Church is located near Portumna, about 1 km (0.62 mi) from the River Shannon.

== Description ==
Portland Church is an early stone church with Romanesque features. The east window is very small and the sacristy at the rear is corbelled.
