= Rathanadav =

Ringfort and henge in County Tipperary, Ireland

- Carron Henge; Fort Aengus
- Location within Ireland
- 52.475425°N 7.887863°W
- Type: ringfort
- Periods: Bronze or Iron Age (c. 2400 BC – AD 400)
- Location: Carron, Cashel, County Tipperary, Ireland
- Region: Suir Valley

Site notes
- Material: earth
- Elevation: 131 m (430 ft)
- Height: 1.5 m (4 ft 11 in)
- Area: 2.65 ha (6.5 acres)
- Diameter: 117 m (384 ft)
- Owner: private

National monument of Ireland
- Official name: Rathanadav Ringfort
- Reference no.: 537

Rathanadav, also called Carron Henge, Rathnadob, Rathnadov or Fort Aengus (after Óengus mac Nad Froích), is a ringfort (rath) and henge, and a National Monument located in County Tipperary, Ireland.

== Location ==
Rathanadav is located on a hill about 4 km (2.5 mi) south of Cashel, 6.4 km (4.0 mi) east of the River Suir. It may be part of the larger Rathnadrinna royal complex, located 2 km (1.2 mi) to the north.

== Description ==
Rathanadav is a rath enclosed by a wide henge about 100 m (330 ft) in diameter, with an entrance near the north. Inside are five low mounds which may contain burials or maybe the remains of internal structures.
