= Timoney Stones =

- Galláin Thuaim Eabhna (Irish)
- Location within Ireland
- 52.900309°N 7.720127°W
- Type: standing stones
- Location: Cullaun/Timenyhills/Timoney, Roscrea, County Tipperary, Ireland

History
- Built: unknown

Site notes
- Elevation: 160 m (520 ft)
- Height: 0.3–2 m (0.98–6.56 ft)
- Area: Stretching over 40 ha (100 ac)
- Owner: Office of Public Works

The Timoney Stones are a collection of standing stones forming a National Monument in County Tipperary, Ireland.

== Location ==
The Timoney Stones are found in the hills 8 km (5.0 mi) southeast of Roscrea, on the old Timoney Park estate, near the border with County Laois.

== History ==
About 300 stones and five cairns were erected here, and a stone circle. Their origin is a mystery, some placing them in the Neolithic and others much more recently (the 19th century).

== Description ==
121 stones survive, of which 93 are standing and 28 have fallen. They are scattered widely without any clear pattern, except for some in threes (a tall stone, a short stone and a slab), some in pairs (aligned N-S or E-W), and sixteen that form a stone circle 70 m (77 yd) across. The cairns have all been removed.
