= Grallagh Castle =

- Caisleán na Greallaí (Irish)
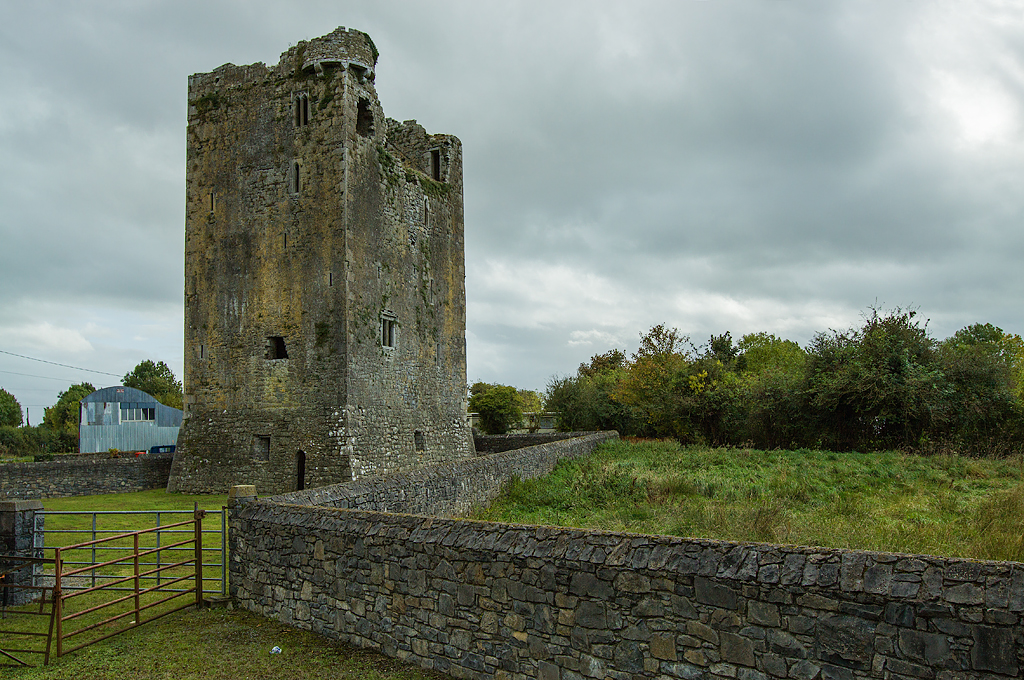

- Location within Ireland
- 52.594772°N 7.771243°W
- Type: tower house
- Location: Grallagh, Horse and Jockey, County Tipperary, Ireland

History
- Built: c. 1500

Site notes
- Owner: Office of Public Works

National monument of Ireland
- Official name: Grallagh Castle
- Reference no.: 407

Grallagh Castle is a tower house and National Monument located in County Tipperary, Ireland.

== Location ==
Grallagh Castle is located 2.5 km (1½ miles) south of the Horse and Jockey, beside a bridge on a tributary of the River Suir.

== History ==
Grallagh Castle dates from the late 15th or early 16th century and was associated with the Butler dynasty. James Butler, 10th Baron of Dunboyne, willed the castle to his son Peter in 1533. In the 18th century it belonged to the Mansergh family. It is now owned by the Office of Public Works.

== Building ==
The four storey tower with steep batter stands partially ruined and surrounded by the remains of a bawn, with 30 m (100 ft) of wall remaining.

There are bartizans in the NE and SW corners. There is a doorway in the west wall with a possible murder hole.

The ground floor contains arrowslits and a barrel vaulted ceiling. A mural stairway gives access to the upper floors. There are some two-light windows with window-seats, and slopstones. There is a fireplace and garderobe on the upper floors.
