= Portland, County Tipperary =

Townland in County Tipperary, Ireland

Coordinates: 53°05′N 8°11′W

Portland (Irish: Port Tulcháin) is a townland in the barony of Ormond Lower, County Tipperary in Ireland. It is located north-east of the Portumna bridge, in the civil parish of Lorrha.

== Buildings of note ==
Portland House is a ruined six bay, two storey over-basement house which was built around 1820. The ground floor was covered and reglazed to allow a bar to be installed in the late 20th century, it is again unoccupied. The grounds overlook the River Shannon and contain a Ha-ha, a walled garden and a renovated gate house.

Portland Harbour and Sawmills are connected to the River Shannon by a small channel. The harbour, built about 1810 of dressed limestone, is now used by pleasure craft. The sawmill buildings are from around 1945 and were located here to make use of the harbour for transport.

Portland Church is listed as a national monument.
