= Ballynoran Church =

- Ard Colm
- Teampall Bhaile an Fhuaráin
- Location within Ireland
- 52.355605°N 7.490105°W
- Location: Ballynoran, Carrick-on-Suir, County Tipperary
- Country: Ireland
- Denomination: Church of Ireland
- Previous denomination: Catholic

Architecture
- Functional status: inactive

Specifications
- Length: 18 m (59 ft)
- Width: 8 m (26 ft)
- Materials: stone

Administration
- Diocese: Waterford and Lismore

National monument of Ireland
- Official name: Ballynoran Church
- Reference no.: 123

Ballynoran Church is a medieval church and National Monument in County Tipperary, Ireland.

== Location ==
Ballynoran Church is located 5 km (3.1 mi) west of Carrick-on-Suir, on the north bank of the River Suir.

== History ==
The church of Ard Colm, "height of the doves". Ardcolme appears in the Papal Taxations of 1306, and Ardcolum in the 1654 Down Survey.

== Building ==
The church is rectangular and now roofless. There is no public path to the church buildings.
