= Ballynahow Castle =

Tower house and National Monument in County Tipperary, Ireland

- Caisleán Bhaile na hAbha (Irish)
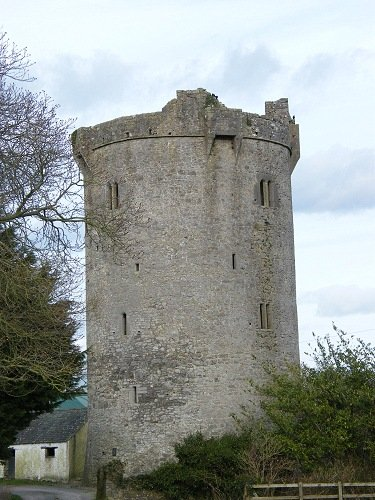

- Location within Ireland
- 52.693070°N 7.878118°W
- Type: tower house
- Location: Ballynahow, Ballycahill, County Tipperary, Ireland

History
- Built: c. 1500–1550

Site notes
- Elevation: 87 m (285 ft)
- Height: 15.2 m (50 ft)
- Architectural style: Tower house
- Owner: Irish state

National monument of Ireland
- Official name: Ballynahow Castle
- Reference no.: 234

Ballynahow Castle is a tower house and a National Monument in County Tipperary, Ireland.

== Location ==
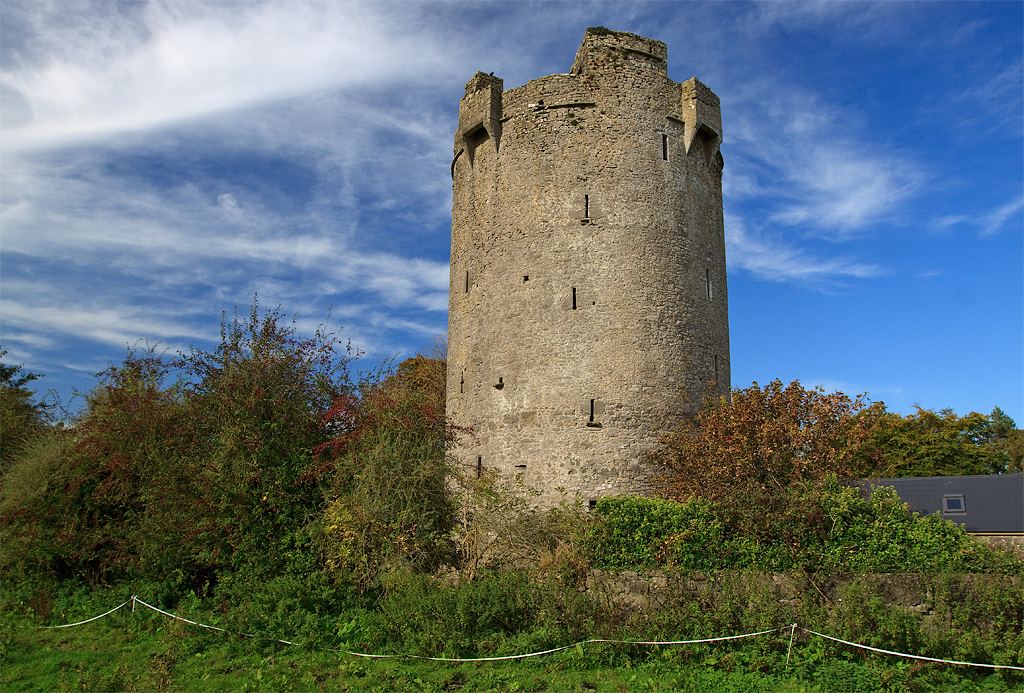
Another view of Ballynahow Castle

Ballynahow Castle is located 4.6 km (2.9 mi) west-northwest of Thurles, on the west bank of the Farneybridge River (a tributary of the River Suir).

== History ==
Ballynahow Castle was built in the early 16th century by the Purcell family, an Old English family who held the title of Baron of Loughmoe. The lower floors were used in the 1840s as a cottage. The tower house was transferred to state ownership in 1930.

== The tower house ==
The tower house (caiseal) rises 15.2 m (50 ft) to the chemin de ronde, off which are four evenly spaced machicolations. It is five storeys tall with slit windows and large fireplaces on the second and fourth levels. A hole in the north wall on the fourth level leads to a secret chamber set into the walls. Originally the top level was covered by a conical timber roof carried on squinches.
