= Toureen Peakaun =

- An Tuairín Peacán (Irish)
- Location within Ireland
- 52.408754°N 7.993235°W
- Type: church
- Location: Toureen, County Tipperary, Ireland

History
- Built: 11th/12th century AD

Site notes
- Elevation: 53 m (174 ft)
- Architectural style: Romanesque

National monument of Ireland
- Official name: Toureen Peakaun
- Reference no.: 332

Toureen Peakaun is an ancient church located in County Tipperary, Ireland.

== Location ==
Toureen Peakaun is located about 5.8 km (3.6 mi) northwest of Cahir.

== Description ==
In the 7th century, St Alban chose the Glen of Aherlow region as the location for a monastery. The site, known as Toureen Peakaun, features the ruins of a rectangular 12th century AD church. Of note are the cross-slab fragments in the wall and remains of crosses between the church and gate.

Today, pilgrims continue to visit the church and the nearby holy well.
