= Ballycomisk Ringforts =

Archaeological site in Ireland

- Ráthanna Bhaile Cumaisc (Irish)
- Location within Ireland
- 52.489444°N 7.840833°W
- Type: ringforts
- Periods: Bronze or Iron Age (c. 2400 BC – AD 400)
- Location: Ballycomisk, Cashel, County Tipperary, Ireland
- Region: Suir Valley

Site notes
- Material: earth
- Elevation: 140 m (460 ft)
- Owner: private

National monument of Ireland
- Official name: Ballycomisk Three Ringforts
- Reference no.: 581

Ballycomisk Ringforts are three ringforts (raths) forming a National Monument located in County Tipperary, Ireland.

== Location ==
Ballycomisk Ringforts are located 4.2 km (2.7 mi) southeast of Cashel.

== Description ==
There is one large rath 66 m (218 ft) in diameter, and to the south of it two more raths which are largely obliterated by modern farming.
