= Terryglass Castle =

Fortified house and a National Monument in County Tipperary, Ireland

- Caiseal Thír Dhá Ghlas (Irish)
- Terryglass Castle, 2009
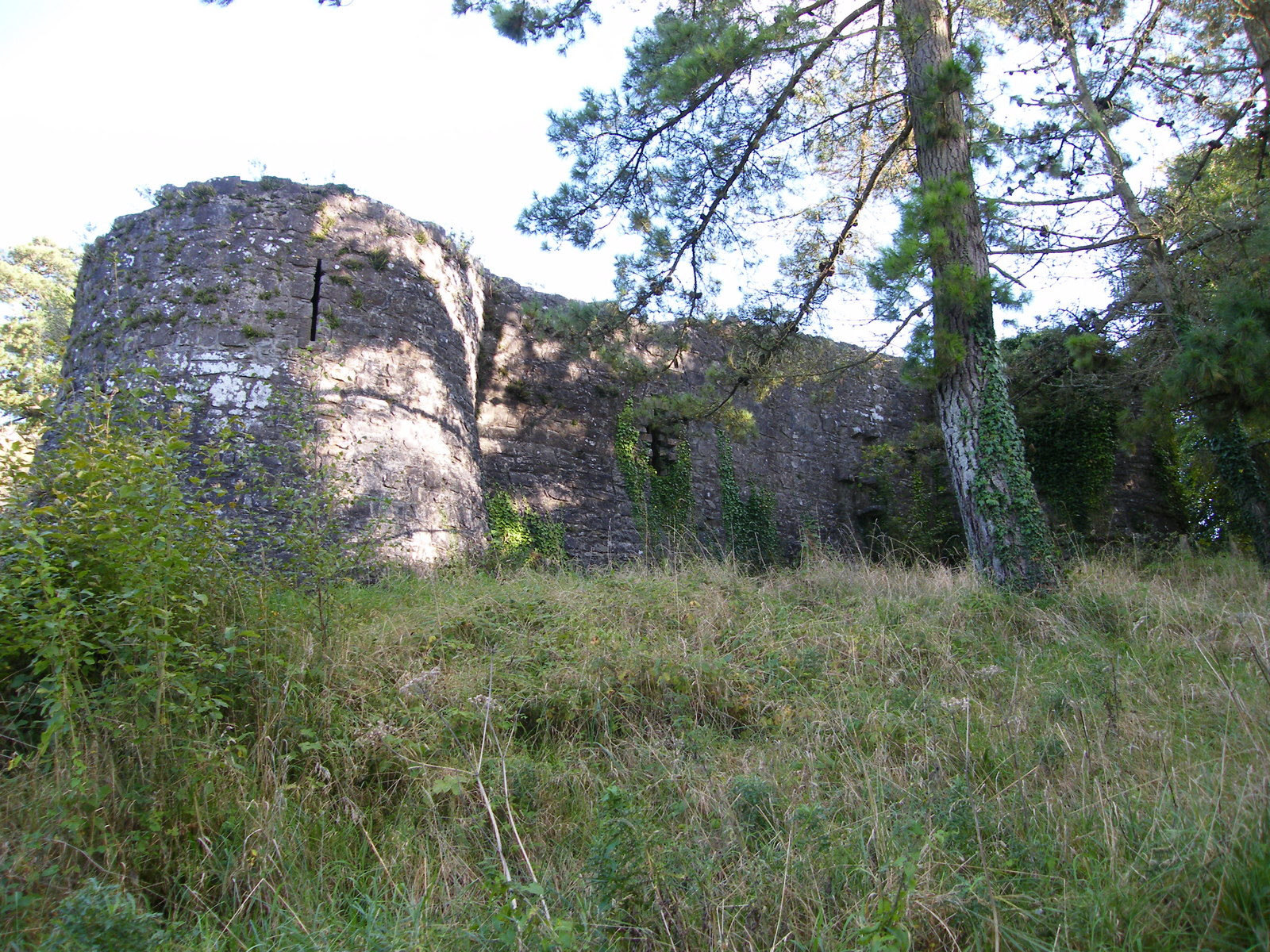

- Location within Ireland
- 53.059436°N 8.211932°W
- Type: Fortified house
- Location: Terryglass, County Tipperary, Ireland

History
- Built: 1219–32

Site notes
- Owner: private

National monument of Ireland
- Official name: Terryglass Castle
- Reference no.: 363

Terryglass Castle, also called the Old Court, is a fortified house and a National Monument in County Tipperary, Ireland.

== Location ==
Terryglass Castle is located in the northeast corner of Lough Derg.

== History ==
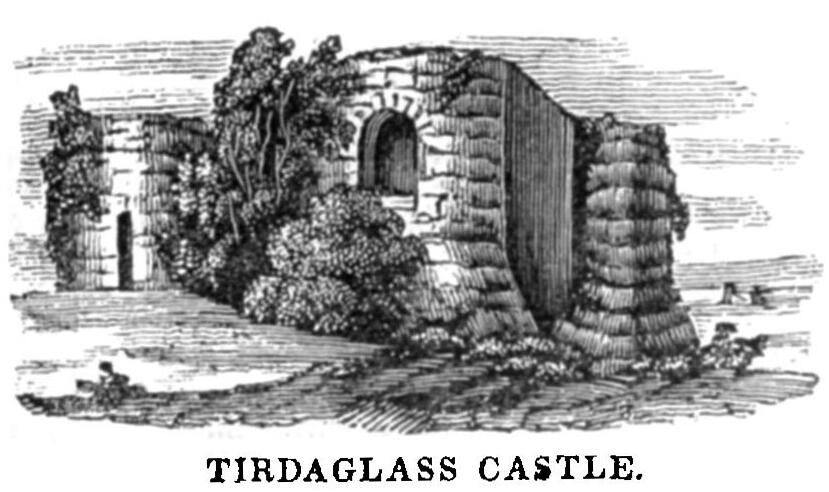
Tirdaglass Castle, 1833

An early Christian monastery was established here in the 6th century by Columba, who died around AD 552.

Terryglass Castle is listed as having contributed to taxation of the diocese in 1302-1307 and is mentioned as having a covered chancel in the Royal Visitation of 1615, although by the Civil Survey of 1654–56 only a churchyard is mentioned.

== Building ==
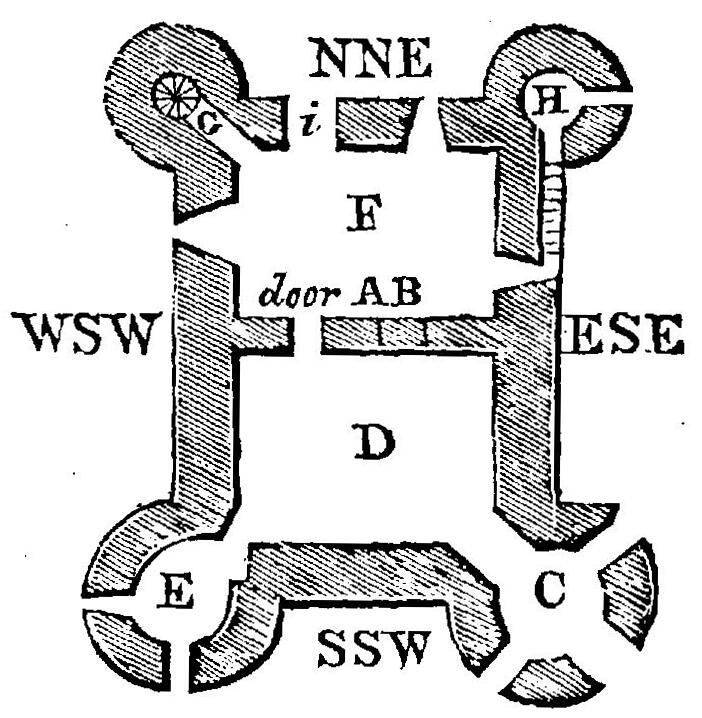
plan, 1833

Terryglass is a four-towered keep built by the Marshall family. The castle was constructed between 1219 and 1232 by John Marshall. By 1232, John Marshall was listed as having significant debts to King Henry III, who used the castle and surrounding lands as security against the debts.

The castle was to change hands many times passing to Nicholas Dunheaued in 1275–76, Theobald le Botiller, 2nd Chief Butler of Ireland in 1289, William Marshall in 1290, Richard Óg de Burgh, 2nd Earl of Ulster in 1323 and James Butler in 1589.
