= Ardcroney Burial Mound =

- Featrach Ard Cróine (Irish)
- Location within Ireland
- 52.941172°N 8.18571°W
- Type: cist
- Location: Ardcroney, County Tipperary, Ireland

Site notes
- Elevation: 70 m (230 ft)

National monument of Ireland
- Official name: Ardcroney
- Reference no.: 604

Ardcroney Burial Mound is a burial mound (Linkardstown-type cist) located in County Tipperary, Ireland. It is located about 2.2 km (1.4 mi) east-southeast of Ardcroney village, and is subject to protection under the National Monuments Acts.
