= Abbeville, County Tipperary =

Abbeville Baile an Phíopaire
- Townland
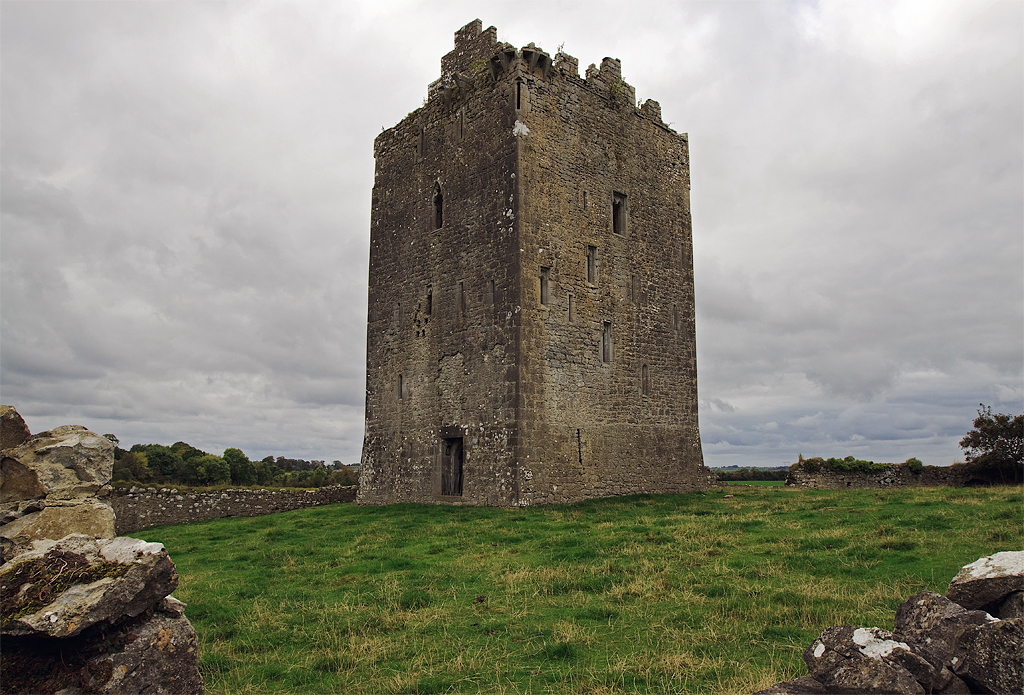
- Lackeen Castle in Abbeville townland (near Lorrha) in County Tipperary

- Location in Ireland
- Coordinates: 53°05′32″N 8°07′25″W
- Country: Ireland
- Province: Munster
- County: County Tipperary
- Time zone: UTC+0 (WET)
  - Summer (DST): UTC-1 (IST (WEST))

Abbeville (Irish: Baile an Phíopaire) is a townland in the Barony of Ormond Lower, County Tipperary, Ireland. It is located in the Civil parish of Lorrha.

== Protected structures ==
Lackeen Castle is a tower house built in the 12th century as a Kennedy stronghold. It is a national monument in state ownership. It was here that the Lorrha Missal was found.

Other buildings within this townland that appear on North Tipperary County Council's Record of Protected Structures (ref S1-S4) and include a number of private houses (including the 17th or 18th century Lackeen House), and a former RIC barracks turned pub located on the R438 road.
