= Ardcroney =

Village in County Tipperary, Ireland

Ardcroney Ard Cróine
- Village
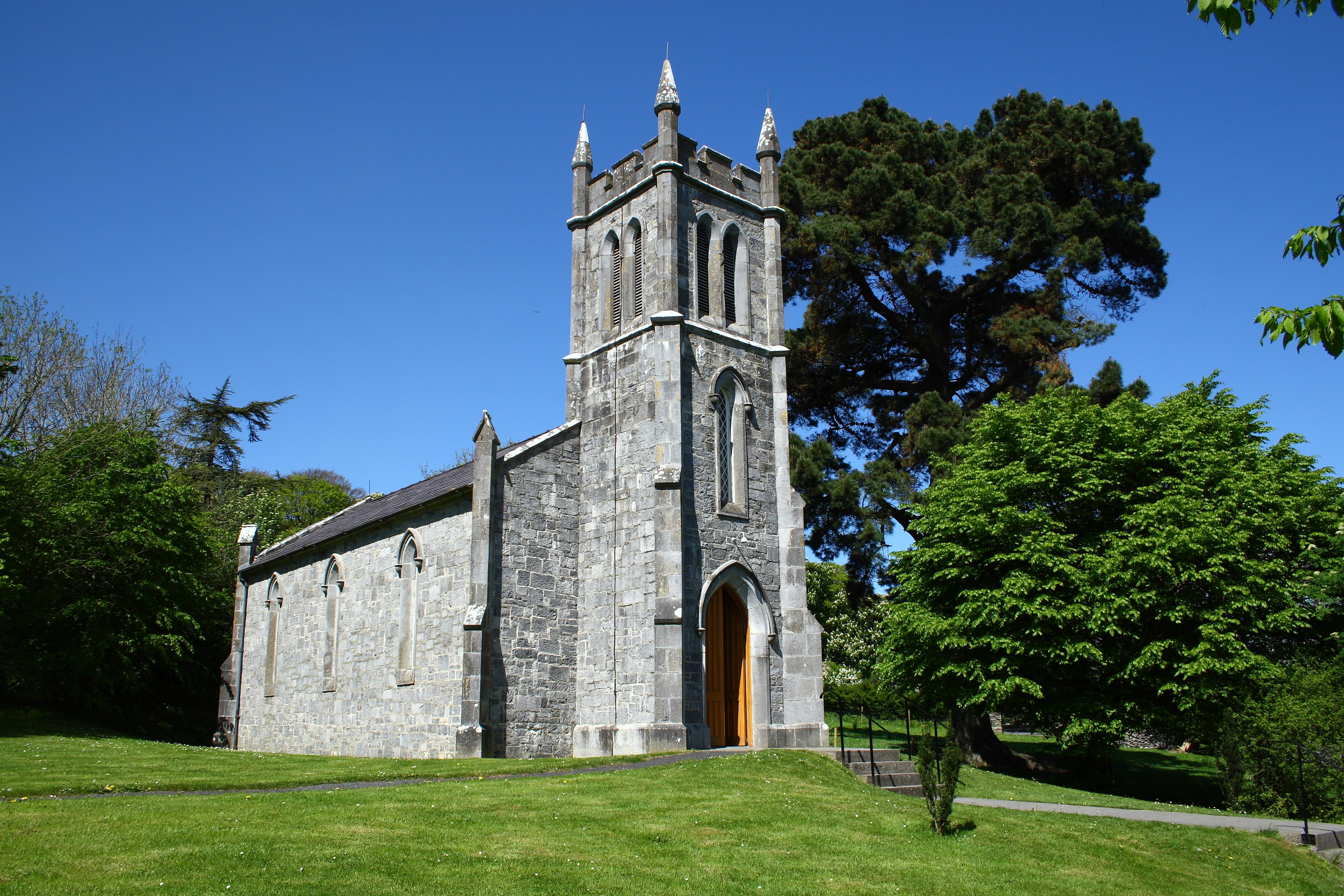
- Ardcroney Church of Ireland Church which was moved to Bunratty Folk park

- Location in Ireland
- Coordinates: 52°56′12″N 8°09′15″W
- Country: Ireland
- Province: Munster
- County: Tipperary

Ardcroney, officially Ardcrony (Irish: Ard Cróine, meaning 'Cronia's height'), is a village and townland in County Tipperary, Ireland, 9 km (5.6 mi) north of Nenagh. It also forms a civil parish in the historical barony of Ormond Lower. It is halfway between Nenagh and Borrisokane on the N52 road.

== Buildings of note ==
Ardcroney church is a T-plan gable-fronted church, built in 1838. Along with a later (c.1975) detached round bell tower with conical slate roof, it is listed as a protected structure by Tipperary County Council (RPS Ref S583). The local Church of Ireland church was moved to Bunratty folk park where it was unveiled in 1998. Ardcroney Burial Mound is located about 2 km east of Ardcroney; It is listed as a national monument and is in state care.

== Sport ==
The local junior soccer club, Ardcroney FC, was formed in 1982.

== See also ==
- List of civil parishes of Tipperary
- List of towns and villages in the Republic of Ireland
