= Monaincha Church =

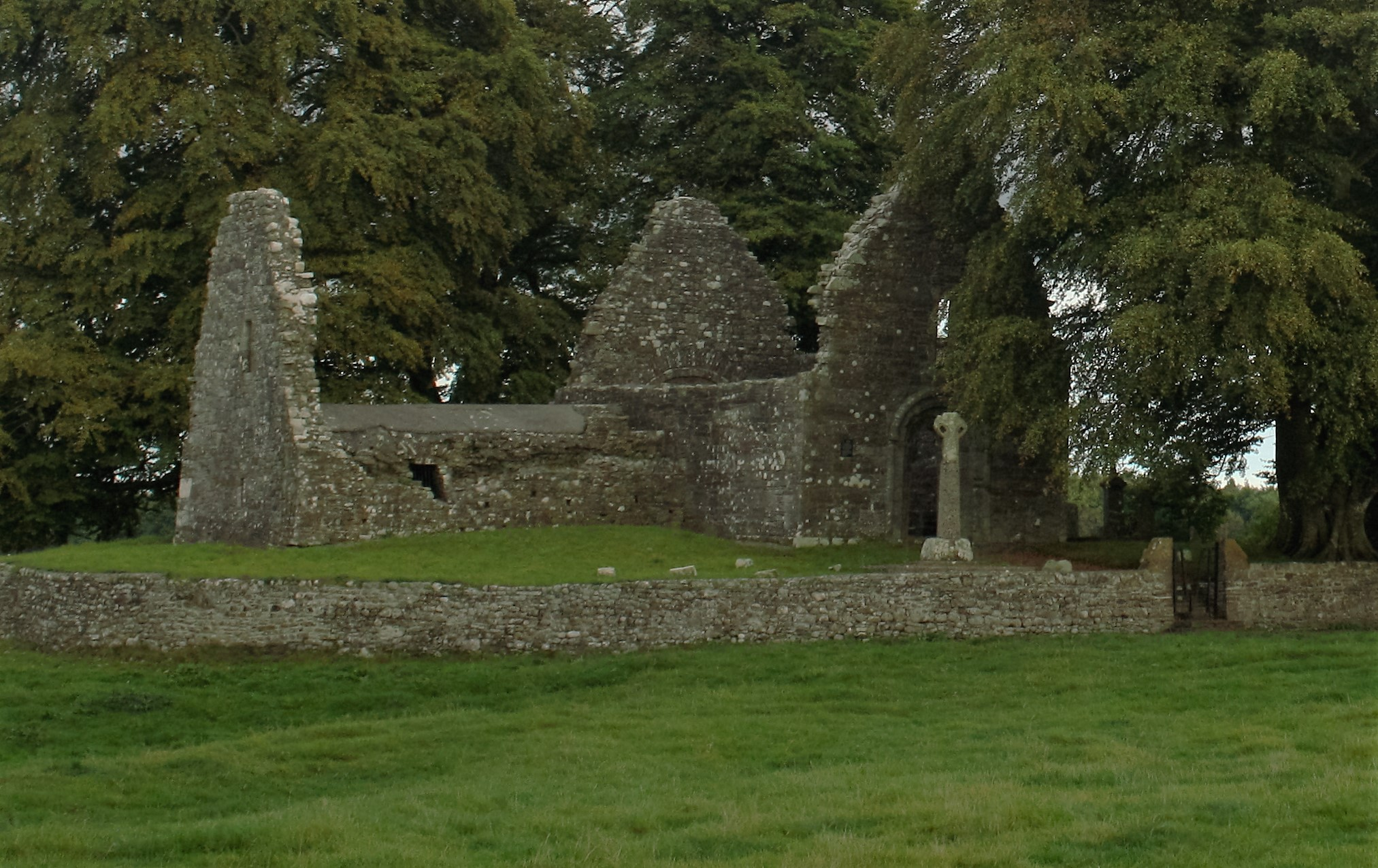
- Monaincha Church
- 52°56′46″N 07°44′55″W
- Country: Ireland
- Denomination: Roman Catholic

History
- Status: Ruins
- Founded: 12th century AD

National monument of Ireland
- Official name: Monaincha Church
- Reference no.: 125

Monaincha Church is a 12th-century church in Roscrea, County Tipperary, Ireland. It is registered as National Monument number 125.

== Location ==
The church is approximately 2.5 km from the town of Roscrea in the barony of Ikerrin and the civil parish of Corbally, County Cork. It was built on an island in the bog lake of Loch Cré or Logri. The island and lake are described in the 13th-century Norwegian text, The King's Mirror:

There is still another quite extensive lake that is called Logri. In that lake is an islet inhabited by men who live a celibate life and may be called, as one likes, either monks or hermits; they live there in such numbers that they fill the island, though at times they are fewer. It is said concerning this isle that it is healthful and quite free from diseases, so that people grow aged more slowly there than elsewhere in the land. But when one does grow very old and sickly and can see the end of the days allotted by the Lord, he has to be carried to some place on the mainland to die; for no one can die of disease on the island. One may sicken and suffer there, but his spirit cannot depart from the body before he has been removed from the island.

In his 1188 text Topographia Hibernica, historian Gerald of Wales describes the legend of the church and islands:

Chapter IV: Of two islands, in one of which no one dies, and in the other, no animal of the female sex enters. There is a lake in the northern parts of Munster, containing two islands, one large, the other small. In the larger island there is a church held in great veneration from the earliest times; the smaller island contains a chapel, which is devoutly served by a few celibates, called Heaven-worshippers, or Godworshippers. No woman, nor any animal of the female sex, could ever enter the larger island without instant death. This has been often proved by dogs and cats, and other animals, of the female sex, which, having been carried over for sake of the experiment, immediately expired. It is an extraordinary fact, that while male birds perch on the bushes on all parts of the island in great numbers, the female birds with whom they pair, fly back, avoiding the island from some natural instinct of its qualities, as if it were infested with the plague. In the smaller island no one ever dies, was ever known to die, or could die a natural death. It is consequently called the Isle of the Living. Notwithstanding, its inhabitants are sometimes severely afflicted with mortal diseases. and languish in misery till life is nearly exhausted. But when no hope remains, all expectation of the powers of life being restored becomes extinct, and they are reduced by their increasing malady to such a degree of suffering that they would rather die than live a life of death, the natives cause themselves to be ferried over in a boat to the larger island, where they breathe their last as soon as they touch the land. I have thought it right to notice this because it is mentioned in the first pages of the Scholastic History, which treats of the inhabitants of islands of this description. The tree of the sun is also there spoken of, concerning which king Alexander writes to Aristotle, that whoever eats of the fruit prolongs his life to an immense period.

== Architecture ==
The church is composed of a nave, chancel, and a high cross. It is noted for its decorative west doorway and sandstone chancel arch. The vaulted sacristy is dated to the 15th or early 16th century. A reconstructed cross with a base dating from the 8th or 9th century with a badly weathered 12th century cross head has been erected by the west door.
