= St. Dominic's Abbey =

- Mainistir Dhoiminiceach Chaisil
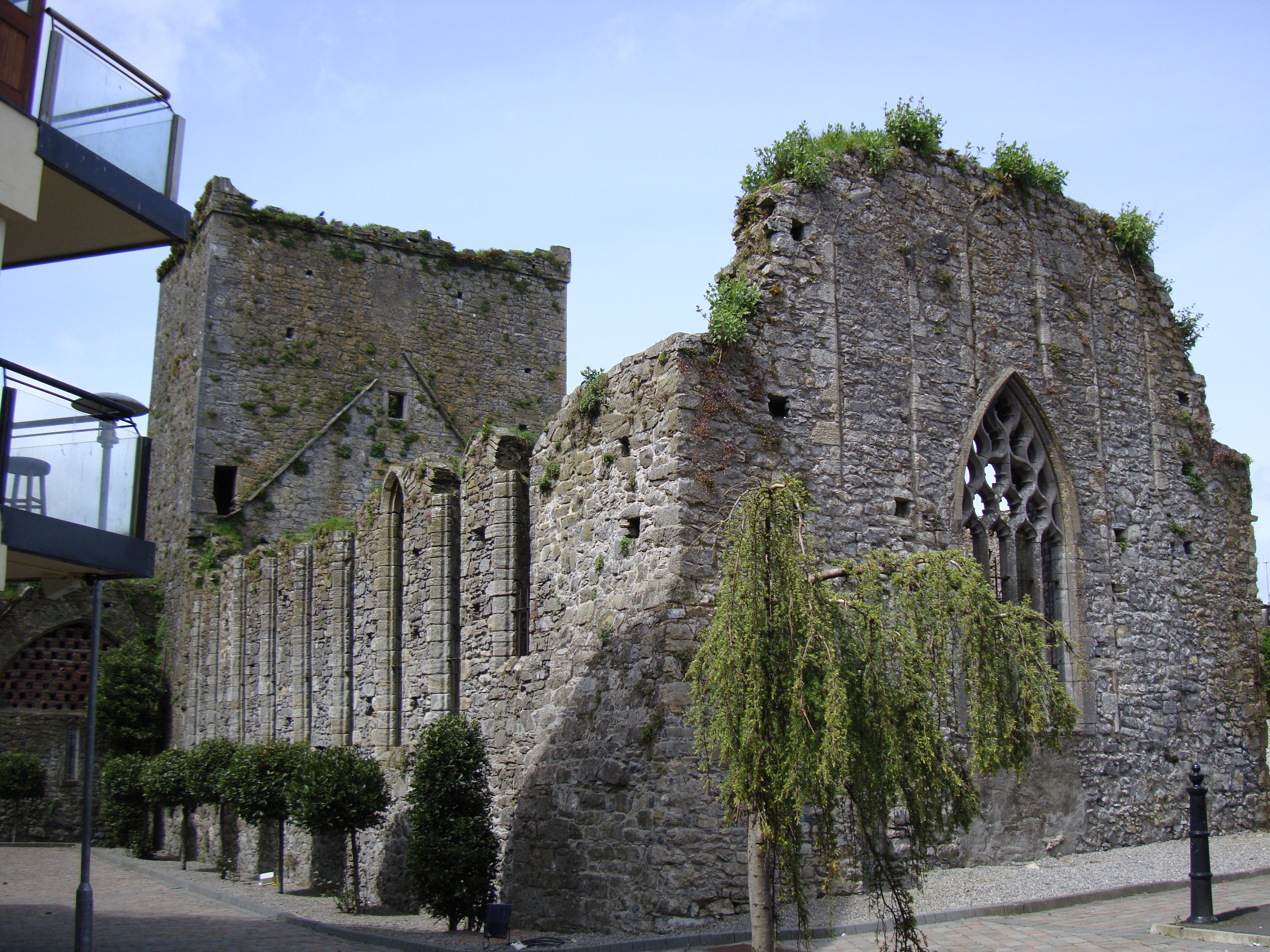
- Ruins of the abbey church

- Location within Ireland
- Interactive map of St. Dominic's Abbey

Monastery information
- Order: Dominican Order
- Established: 1243
- Disestablished: 1540, 1850
- Diocese: Cashel and Emly

People
- Founder: David mac Cellaig

Architecture
- Status: Inactive
- Style: Late Gothic

Site
- Location: Dominic Street, Cashel, County Tipperary
- Coordinates: 52.518066°N 7.887777°W
- Public access: yes

St. Dominic's Abbey is a medieval Dominican abbey and National Monument located in Cashel, Ireland.

== Location ==
St. Dominic's Abbey is located 300 metres (330 yd) southeast of the Rock of Cashel.

== History ==
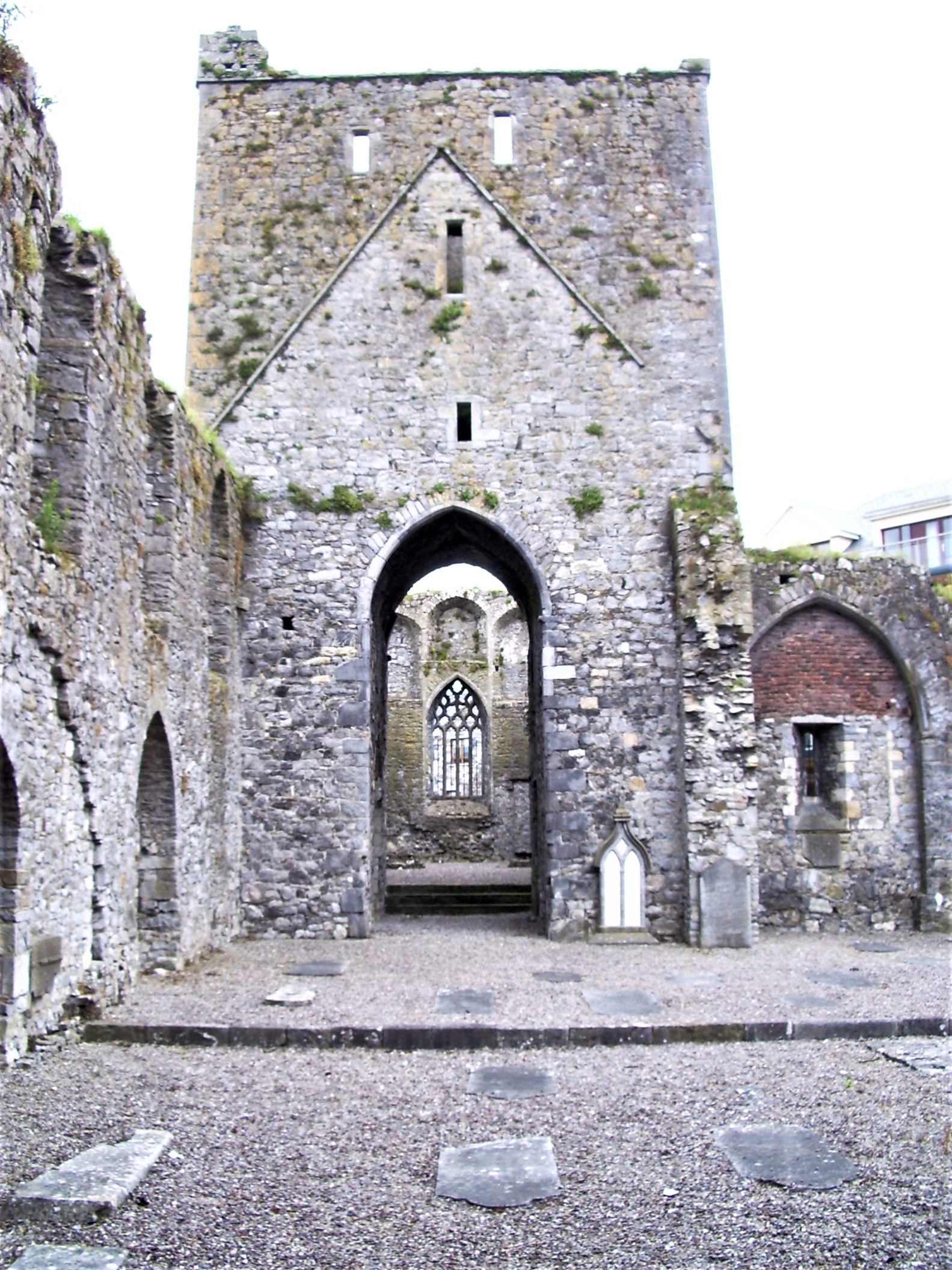
Interior of the abbey church; note the Gothic tracery in the window.

The abbey was founded by Archbishop of Cashel David mac Cellaig (David McKelly) in 1243, during the reign of Henry III. Friars were brought from Cork. In 1256, 1289 and 1307, the Irish Dominican Presidency held its provincial chapter here. The monastery church was expanded c. 1270.

It was later burned accidentally and rebuilt and co-founded by John Cantwell II in 1480.

It was partly leased by Prior Edward Brown 1535-6 and dissolved in 1540; it was surrendered by Prior Edward Brown on 8 April 1540 and leased to Peter Kelly and Walter Fleming. It was then composed of church and belfry, a dormitory, a chamber with two cellars, a cemetery, two orchards, and two parks or gardens containing two acres. St Dominic's was granted to Walter Fleming in 1543-4.

In 1756 there were five fathers attached to the convent of by 1800 there was only one. The last Dominican of Cashel was Father Conway, who was still there in 1850.

== Buildings ==
The abbey is quasi-cruciform in plan with a high tower over the crossing. It has only one aisle and transept.
