= Derryvella =

Monastery in County Tipperary, Ireland

- Mainistir Chathair Dún Iascaigh
- Location within Ireland
- Interactive map of Derryvella

Monastery information
- Other names: Doire-mor; Daire-mor
- Established: mid-7th century AD
- Diocese: Cashel and Emly

Architecture
- Status: ruined
- Style: Celtic

Site
- Location: Derryvella, Littleton, County Tipperary
- Coordinates: 52.617942°N 7.669079°W
- Public access: yes

Derryvella, known as Daire Mór, is a medieval Christian monastery and National Monument located in County Tipperary, Ireland. Disambiguation Derryvella (Corlough) townland, County Cavan.

== Location ==
Derryvella is located on a natural rise in bog, to the east of Lough Derryvella, 5.2 kilometres (3.2 mi) southwest of Littleton, County Tipperary.

== History ==
This may be the same site as Daire Mór ("great oakwood"), founded by Colmán of Derrymore; although others claim that Daire Mór is actually the site at Longfordpass North, and that the site at Derryvella is Doire Meille, associated with Tigernach of Clones and reputedly the second-oldest churchyard in Ireland.

A monastery existed here from the mid-7th century AD.

== Description ==
Derryvella is a circular enclosure, measuring 150 metres (490 ft) north-south and 125 metres (410 ft) east-west.
