= Blasket Islands =

Uninhabited islands off the west coast of County Kerry, Ireland

Coordinates: 52°05′21″N 10°32′49″W

Native name: Na Blascaodaí
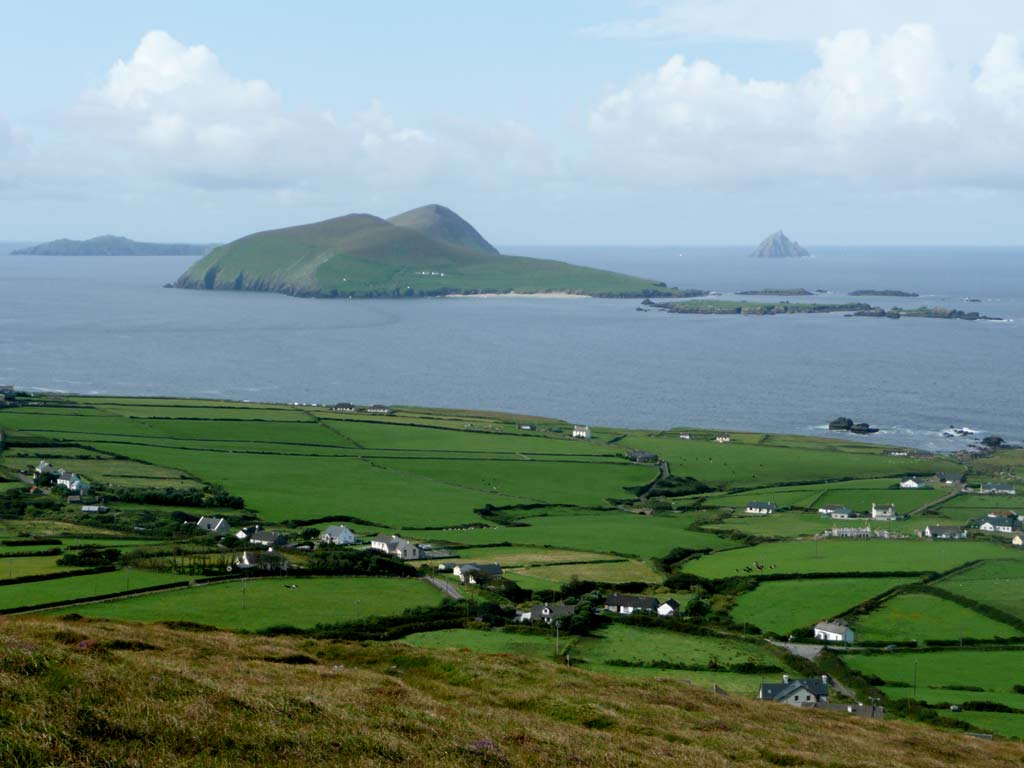
- Blasket Islands as seen from the lower slopes of Mount Eagle

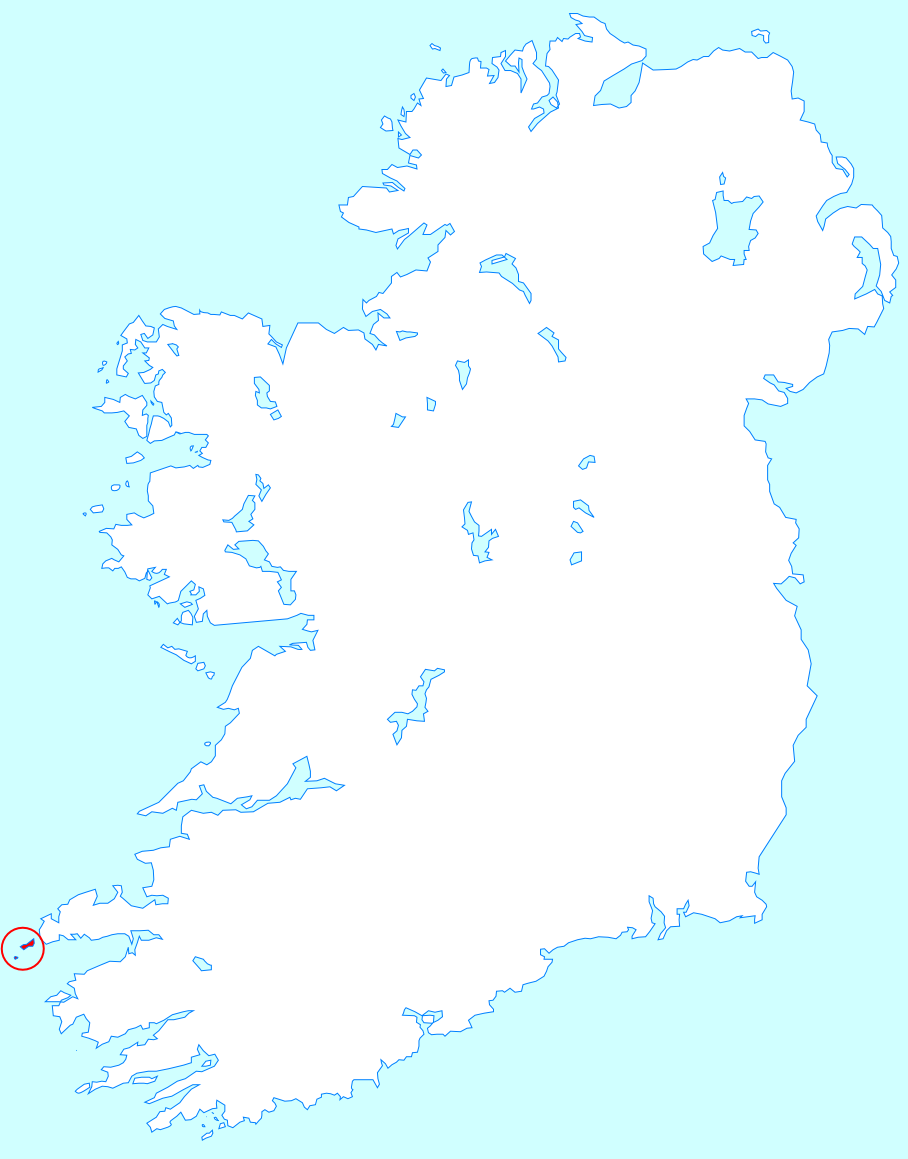
- Location map of the Blasket Islands

Geography
- Location: Atlantic Ocean
- Major islands: 6
- Highest elevation: 346 m (1135 ft)
- Highest point: An Cró Mór

Administration
- Ireland
- County: Kerry

Demographics
- Population: 0 (2016)

The Blasket Islands (Irish: Na Blascaodaí) are an uninhabited group of islands off the west coast of the Dingle Peninsula in County Kerry, Ireland. The last island to hold a significant population, Great Blasket Island, was abandoned in 1954 due to population decline and is best known for a number of Irish language writers who vividly described their way of life and who kept alive old Irish folk tales of the land.

== Name ==
The etymology of the name of the islands is uncertain, but it may be Old Norse in origin. It may have come from the word brasker meaning 'sharp reef of rock' or 'dangerous place'. The islands have also been called Ferriter's Islands. Topographer Charles Smith referred to Great Blasket, the largest of the group of islands, as Inishmore.

== History ==
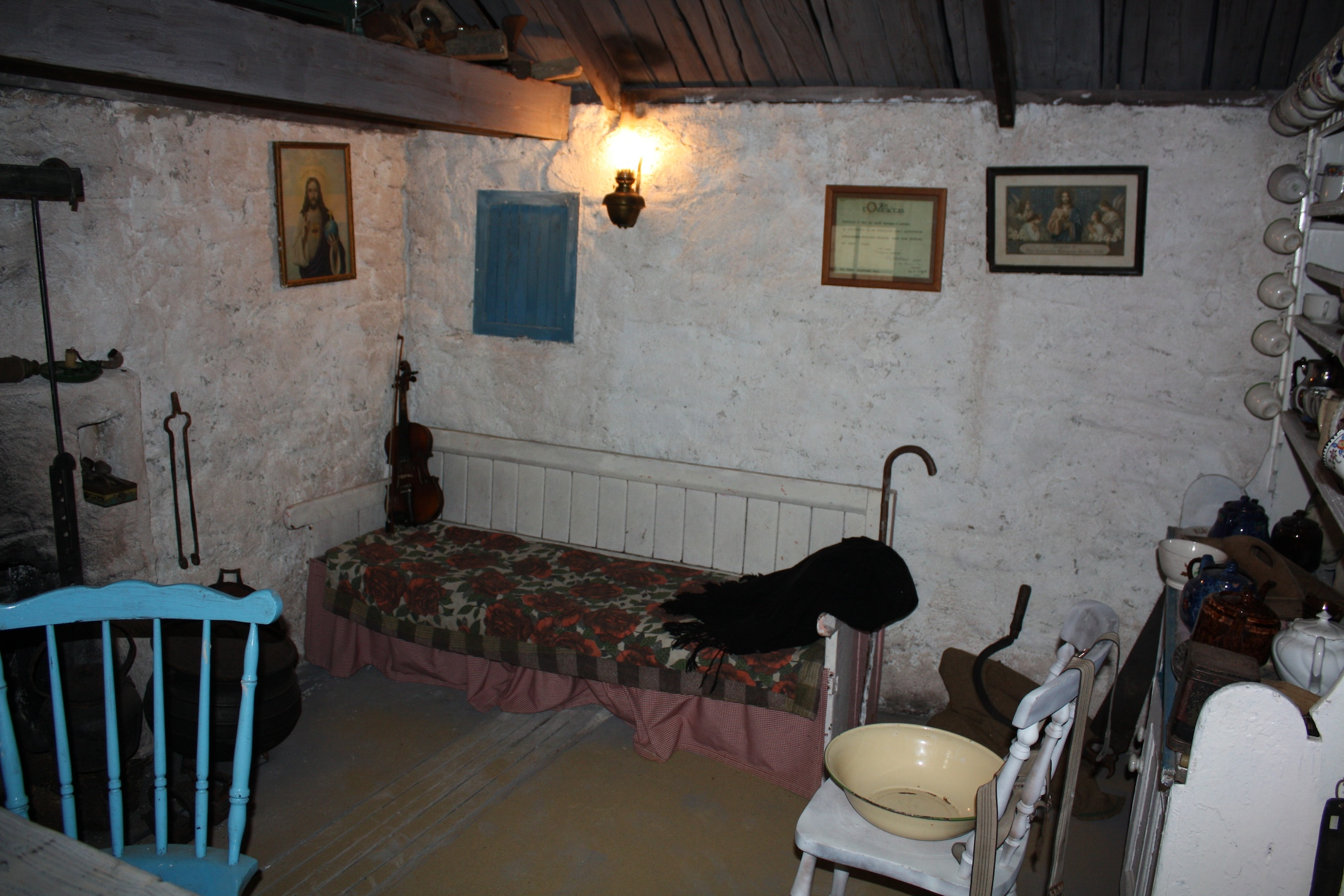
Replica of a traditional Blasket cottage in Dunquin

The earliest known reference to the habitation of the islands is from the late 16th century. However, the Norman-Irish Feiritéar (Ferriter) family who rented the islands from the Earl of Desmond since c. 1290 maintained a castle, possibly at Rinn an Chaisleáin on Great Blasket. The islands were reported to have a population of "five or six families" in the mid-18th century. In the first half of the 19th century, the islands saw a rise in population due to tenants fleeing evictions in Dún Chaoin by Lord Ventry.

The islands were inhabited until 1954 by a completely Irish-speaking population and today are part of the Gaeltacht. At its peak, the islands had 175 residents. The population declined to 22 by 1953. The government evacuated most of the remaining residents to the mainland on 17 November 1953 because of increasingly extreme winter weather that left the island's ageing population cut off from emergency services. The evacuation was seen as necessary by both the Islanders and the government. The Ó Suilleabháin family were reluctant to leave, and became the final family to depart Great Blasket Island in 1954.

The islanders were the subject of much anthropological and linguistic study around the end of the 19th and beginning of the 20th centuries particularly from writers and linguists such as Robin Flower, George Derwent Thomson and Kenneth H. Jackson. Due to their encouragement and that of others, a number of books were written by islanders that record much of the islands' traditions and way of life. These include An tOileánach (The Islandman) and Allagar na hInise (Island cross-talk) by Tomás Ó Criomhthain, Peig and Machnamh Seanamhná (An Old Woman's Reflections) by Peig Sayers, Fiche Blian ag Fás (Twenty Years A-Growing) by Muiris Ó Súilleabháin and Letters from the Great Blasket by Eilís Ní Shuilleabháin.

The first teacher on the islands was Áine O’Donoghue, first sent over at the age of 19, and the great-great-grandmother of comedian and actor Aisling Bea. Áine was the mother-in-law of Irish freedom fighter and school teacher Pádraig Ó Briain.

In 1974 politician Charles Haughey purchased Inishvickillane from the descendants of the Ó Dalaigh family, who had lived on the island 70 years prior. As Taoiseach, Haughey used the island as a summer retreat and hosted many prominent visitors, including French President François Mitterrand. In 1989, he introduced legislation to turn the Blasket Islands into a national park, including powers of compulsory purchase order. This was ruled unconstitutional by Justice Kimberley Budd in 1998.

The archipelago's westernmost island, Tearaght, was inhabited by lighthouse keepers until 1988, when the lighthouse was automated.

== Geography ==
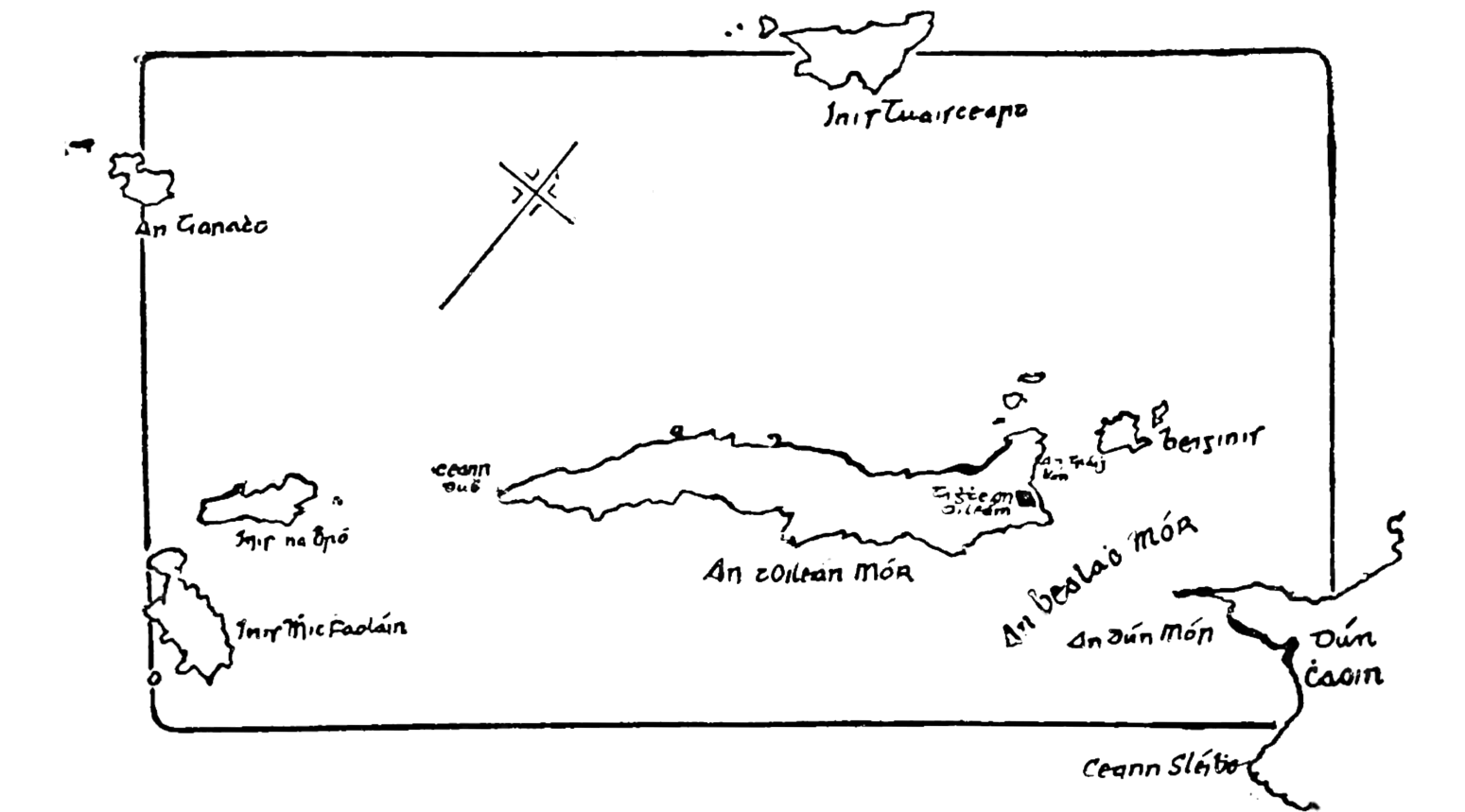
Map of the Blasket Islands as published in The Islandman by Tomás Ó Criomhthain

The six principal Blasket islands, in order of largest to smallest, are:

- Great Blasket Island (An Blascaod Mór)
- Inishtooskert (Inis Tuaisceart), site of an oratory, crosses and clochán (beehive huts).
- Inishvickillane (Inis Mhic Uileáin), site of an oratory, monastic cell and crosses.
- Inishnabro (Inis na Bró)
- Tearaght Island (An Tiaracht)
- Beginish (Beiginis) — not to be confused with Beginish Island in Valentia Harbour

== Environment ==
The Blasket Islands are an important breeding site for grey seals in Ireland and have at least 13 species of breeding seabird. The islands and the surrounding waters are designated by the European Environment Agency as a Natura 2000 special area of conservation and five of the islands (not Great Blasket Island) are also designated as a special protected area. The islands have also been designated an Important Bird Area (IBA) by BirdLife International because they support breeding populations of several species of seabirds.

== Modern transport ==
There is a ferry service that calls only to the Great Blasket and sails from Dún Chaoin. This ferry service is mainly for day-trippers. People can also camp on the island overnight. Passengers are transferred to a RIB (rigid inflatable boat) once the ferry gets close to the island, as there are no adequate landing facilities for a larger vessel.

== Gallery ==
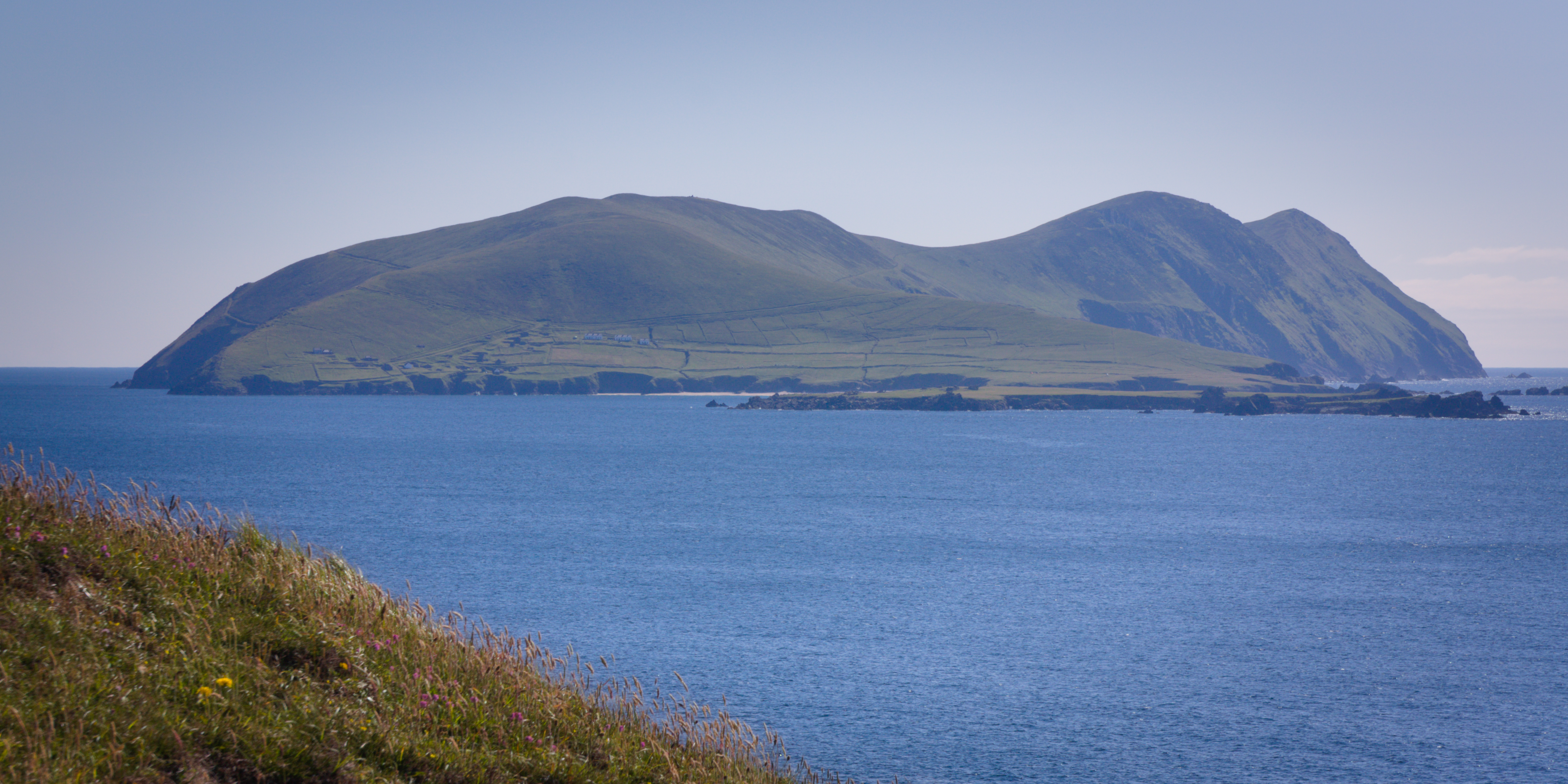
Great Blasket

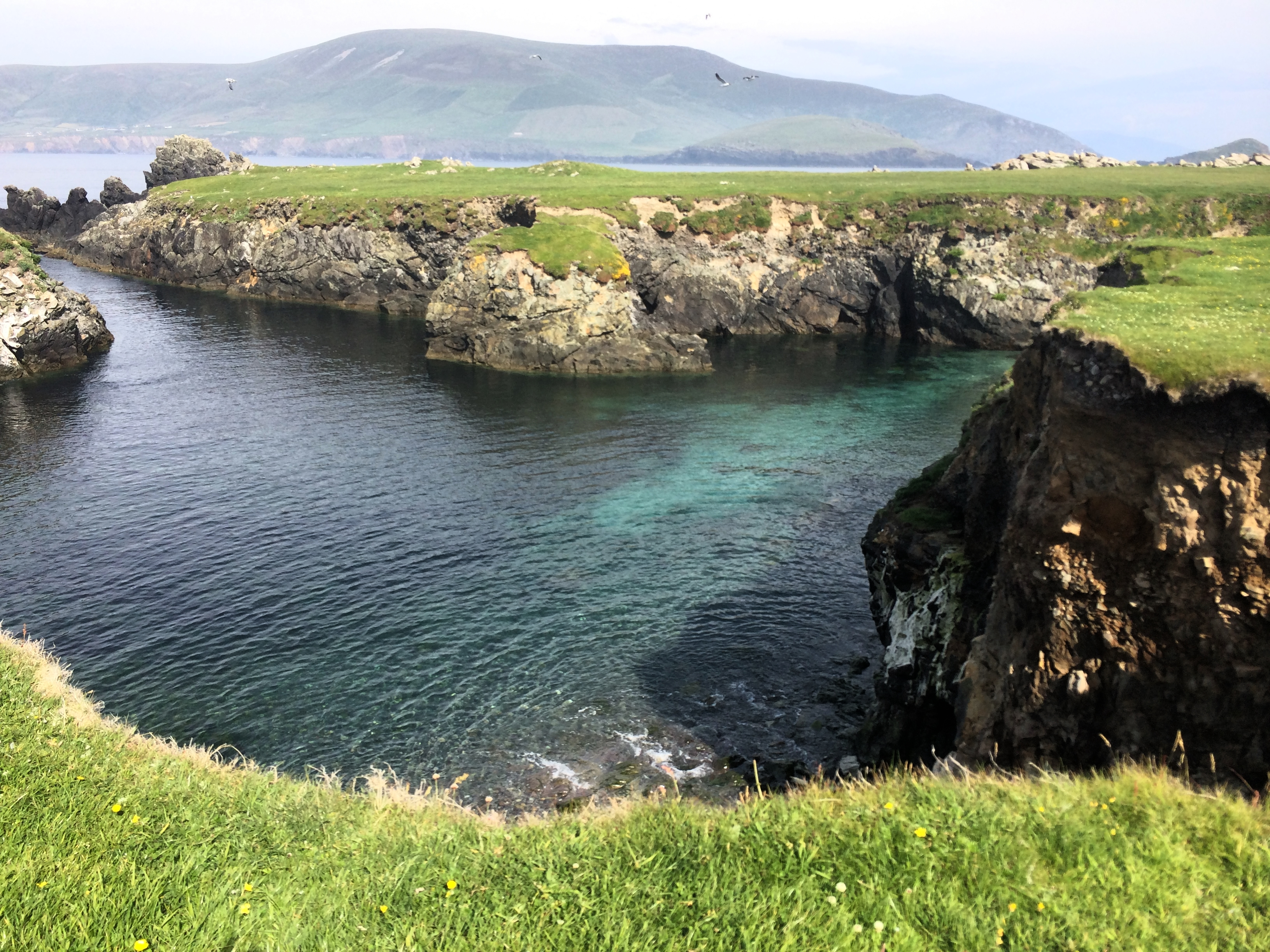
Beginish

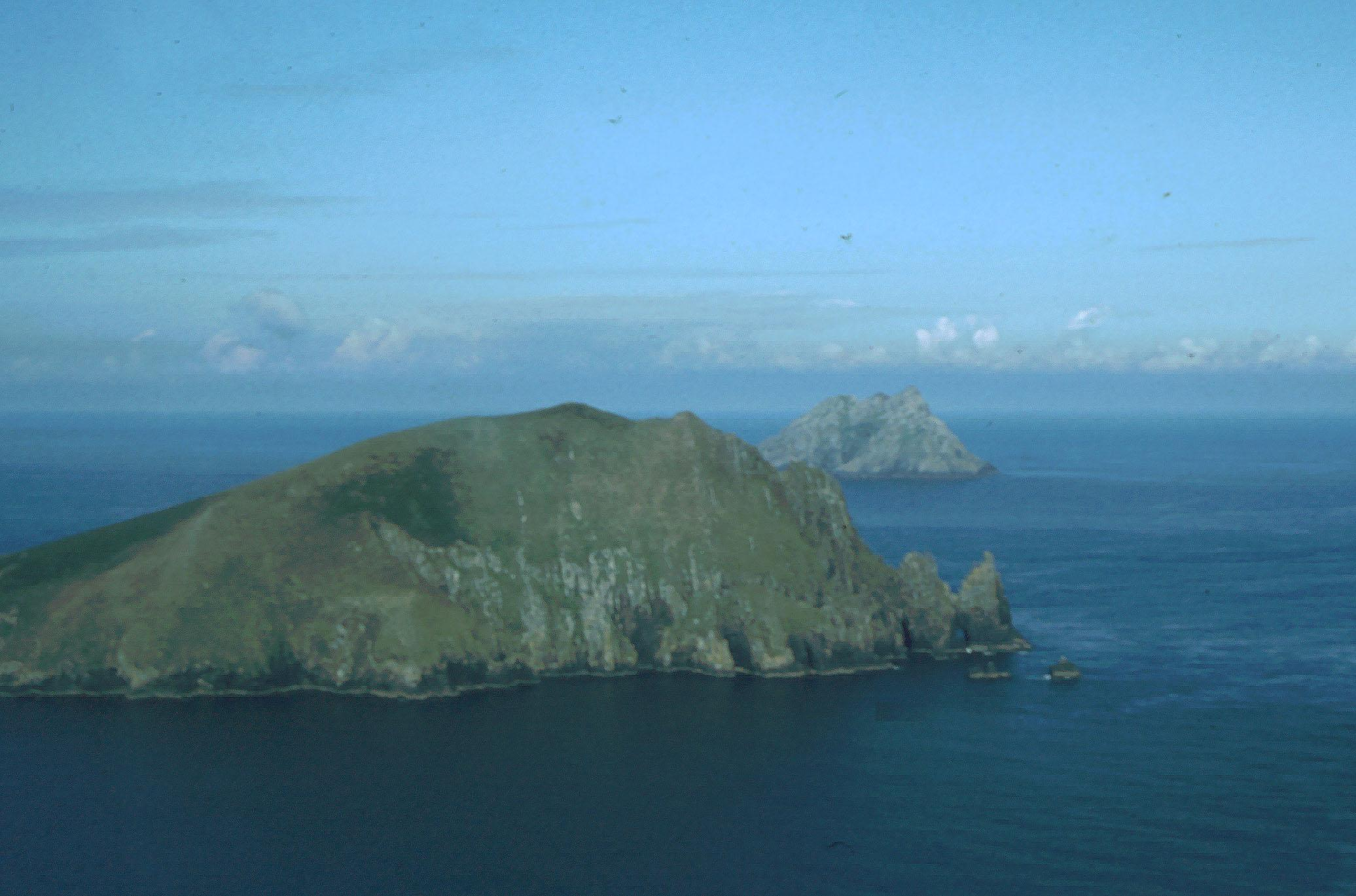
Inishnabro

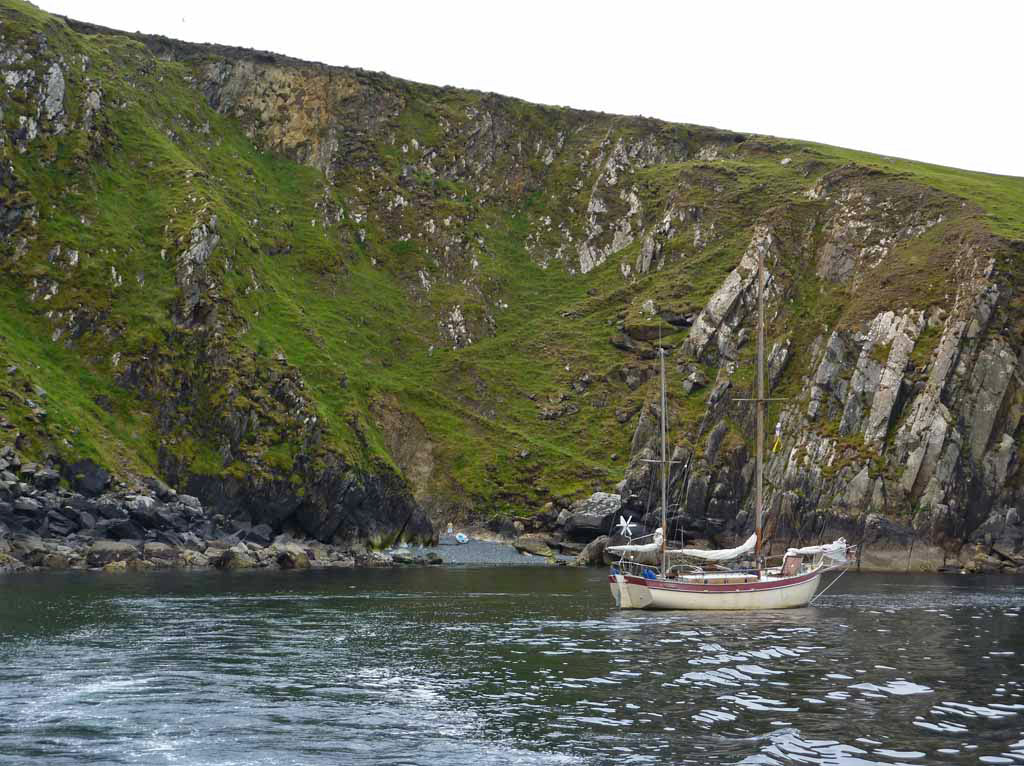
Inishvickillane

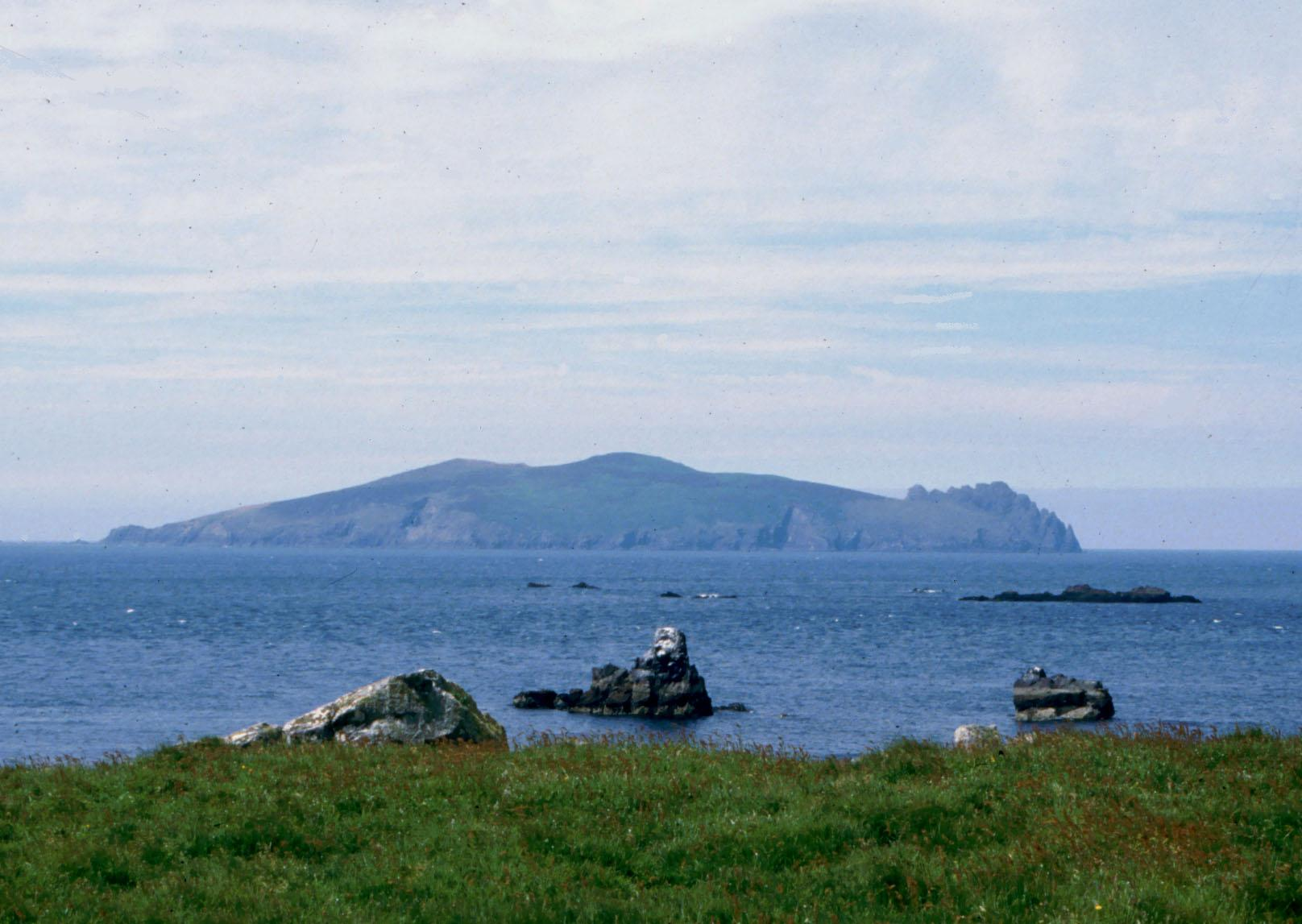
Inishtooskert

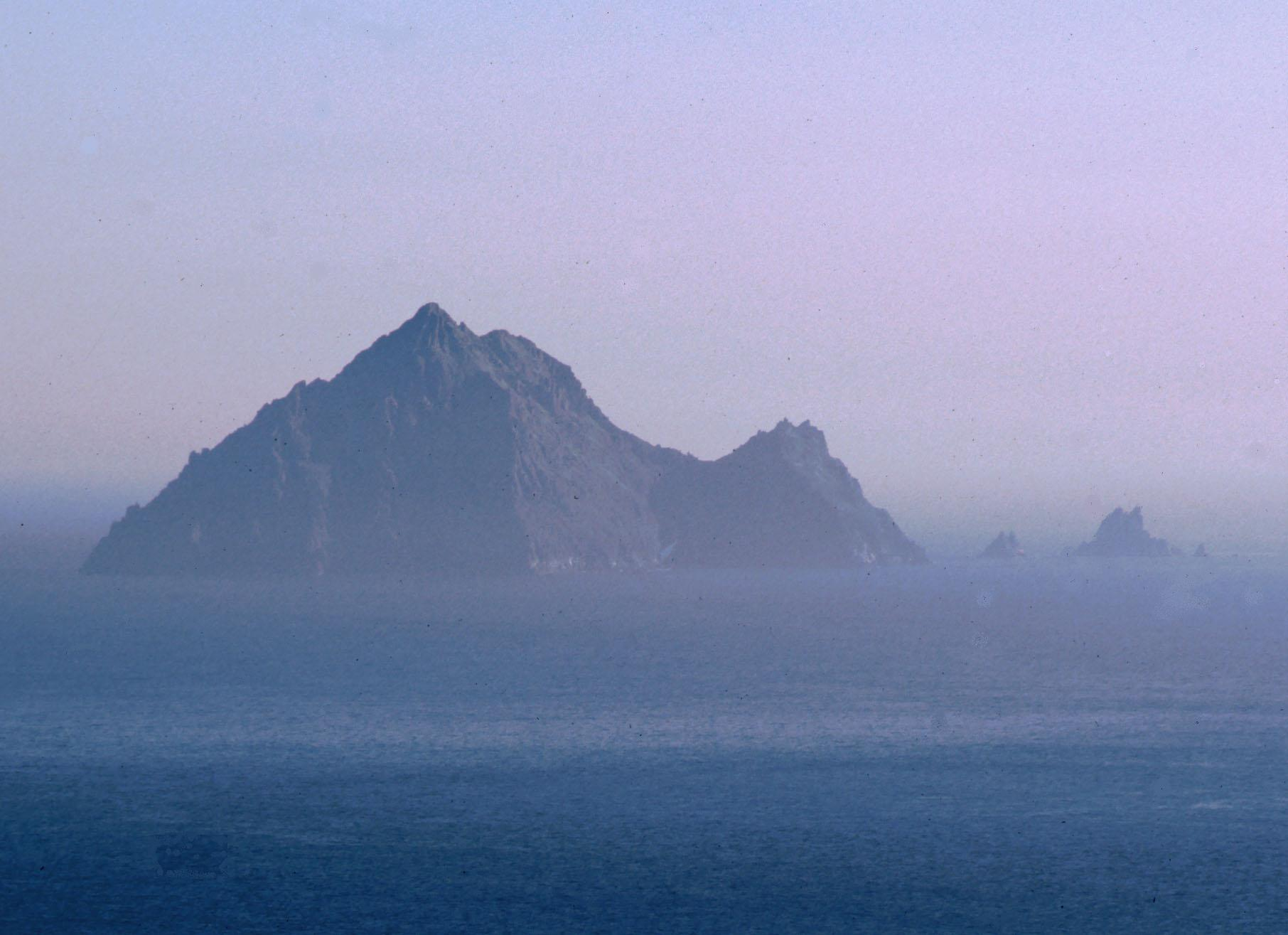
Tearaght
