= Inishvickillane =

Island off the coast of County Kerry, Ireland

Native name: Inis Mhic Aoibhleáin
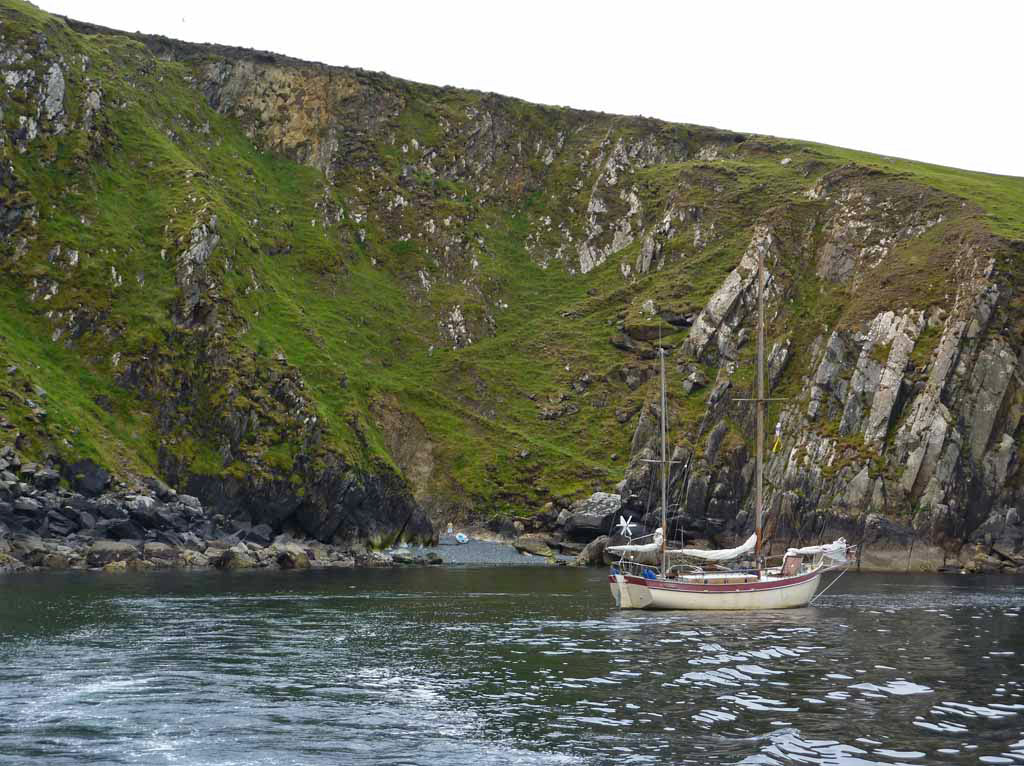

- Location within island of Ireland

Geography
- Location: Atlantic Ocean
- Coordinates: 52.04350°N 10.60829°W
- Archipelago: Blasket Islands
- Area: 205 acres (83 ha)
- Highest elevation: 138 m (453 ft)

Administration
- Ireland
- Province: Munster
- County: County Kerry

Demographics
- Population: 0 (0)
- Pop. density: 0/km^{2} (0/sq mi)

Inishvickillane or Inishvickillaun (from Irish Inis Mhic Aoibhleáin meaning 'Mac Killane's island') is one of the Blasket Islands of County Kerry, Ireland.

== History and Archaeological Significance ==
Referred to by Blasket islanders as "The Inis", Inishvickillane was intermittently inhabited during the nineteenth and early twentieth centuries, by one or more families.

There are extensive ruins of ancient stone buildings of archaeological note on the island. For example, at the south-east end of Inisvickillane are the remains of an early monastic settlement. The unenclosed site comprises the ruins of a dry-stone oratory, a graveyard, a leacht with stone cross, a possible beehive hut, and a holy well dedicated to St. Brendan. The south wall of the oratory featured an inscribed stone with the text:

OR DO MAC RUED U DALAC ("A prayer for Mac-Ruaid, grandson of Dálach").

In 1902 a number of local newspapers reported on the removal of this Ogham stone from the island's ancient oratory as an act of vandalism. In fact, the stone had been brought to Trinity College Dublin for study and examination, where it remains to this day.

Inishvickillane, sometimes referred to as "the last parish before America", will be the first land in Europe to experience the solar eclipse of 23 September 2090.

== Purchase by Charles Haughey ==
In the early 1970s, the perception of West Kerry Gaeltacht was changing as the region received increased tourist activity following the movie Ryan's Daughter. In 1974, Inishvickillane was purchased by Charles J Haughey, a former Irish senior government minister who was lingering in the backbenches since being sacked on foot of the Arms Crisis.

"IT WAS LEARNED yesterday that Mr. Charles Haughey, T.D., had purchased Inishvickillane, an island retreat in the Blaskets in Kerry, for an undisclosed sum. Covering an acre of ground, the former Minister proposes to use it for a family summer home.

The island formerly belonged to the Ó Dalaigh family of Dún Chaoin. All that remains on the deserted' island is the ancestral home of the Ó Dalaighs, who pulled up their roots about 70 years ago. A stone cabin, with lattice windows, it is a solitary reminder of livelier days in Inishvickillane. Members of the Ó Dalaigh family still cross from Dún Chaoin in the summer, using the island for grazing sheep.

Mr. Haughey is likely to build a new bungalow-type house and intends to see to it that the unspoiled charm of the place remains undisturbed".

The purchase generated much media attention at the time, creating much discussion about Haughey's own wealth, business instincts (as land in the area was rising in value) as well as his interest in the heritage of the Gaeltacht. In 1989 while Taoiseach, Haughey introduced legislation to turn the Blasket Islands into a national park, including powers of compulsory purchase order. This was ruled unconstitutional by Mr Justice Declan Budd in 1998.

The 1989 State Papers revealed that the Irish Naval Service and Irish Air Corps had an elaborate plan in place to retrieve Haughey from the remote island in the event that he was required for a government emergency.

== Geography ==
Apart from Tearaght and some rocks, this island is the most western land of Ireland; it is possibly the most western part of the country that had anything like normal habitation, since Tearaght's sole inhabitants seem to have been the keepers of the lighthouse there before that was automated in 1988.

Robin Flower noted in his writings that the island's inhabitants claimed the soil was too rich for potatoes but good for cabbage and onions, and records a claim that tobacco was once successfully grown there.

== Nature ==
Inishvickillane holds important seabird colonies, being especially notable for northern fulmar, European storm-petrel and Atlantic puffin. A herd of red deer was introduced to the island by Haughey in 1980 and reached a peak population of around 100 in 2005. Numbers are currently managed by private cullers.

== Gallery ==
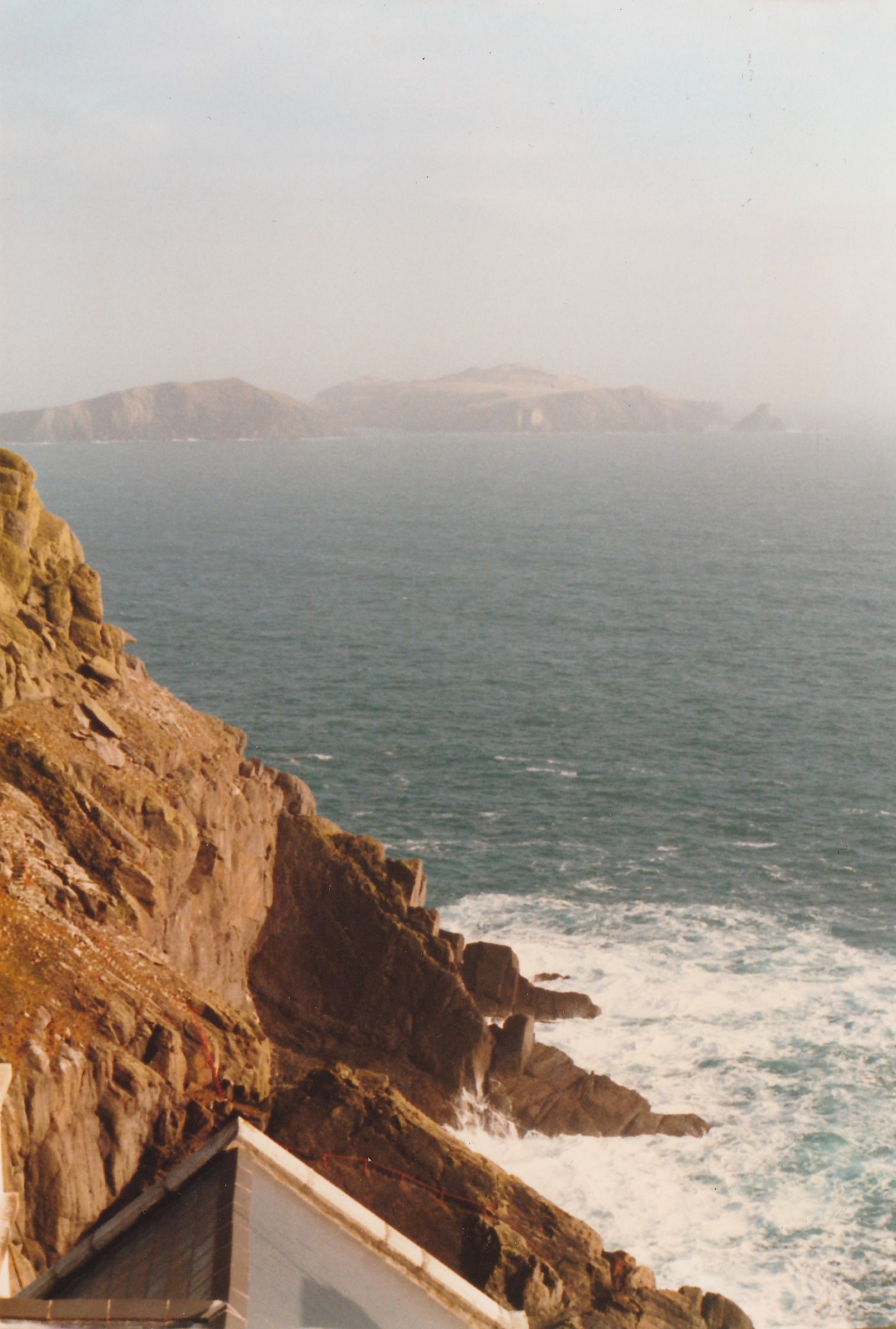
As viewed from Inishtearaght. Note: Inishnabro to left, and Inishvickillane to right

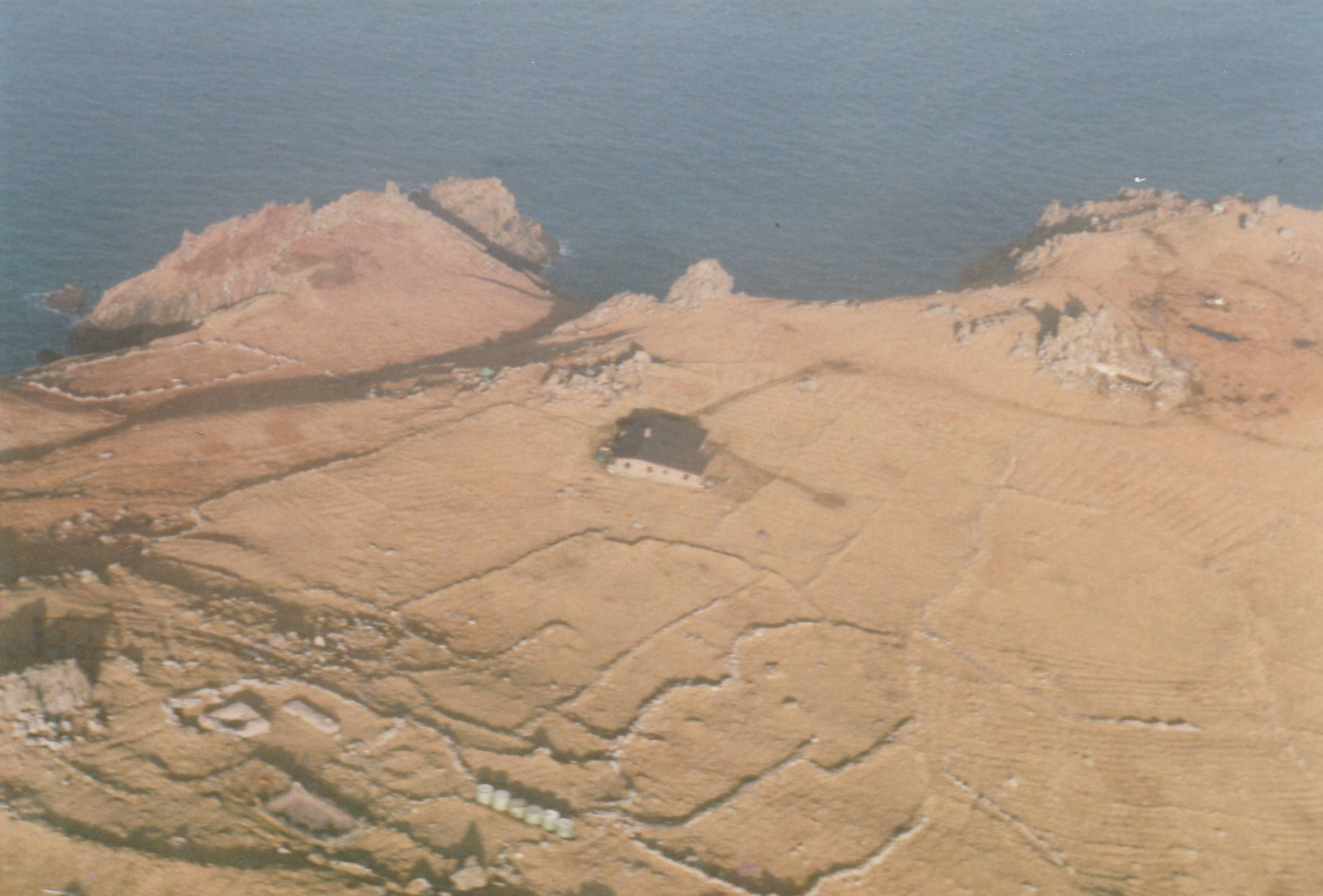
The island as seen from the air in 1987
