= Inishnabro =

Island in Ireland

Native name: Inis na Bró
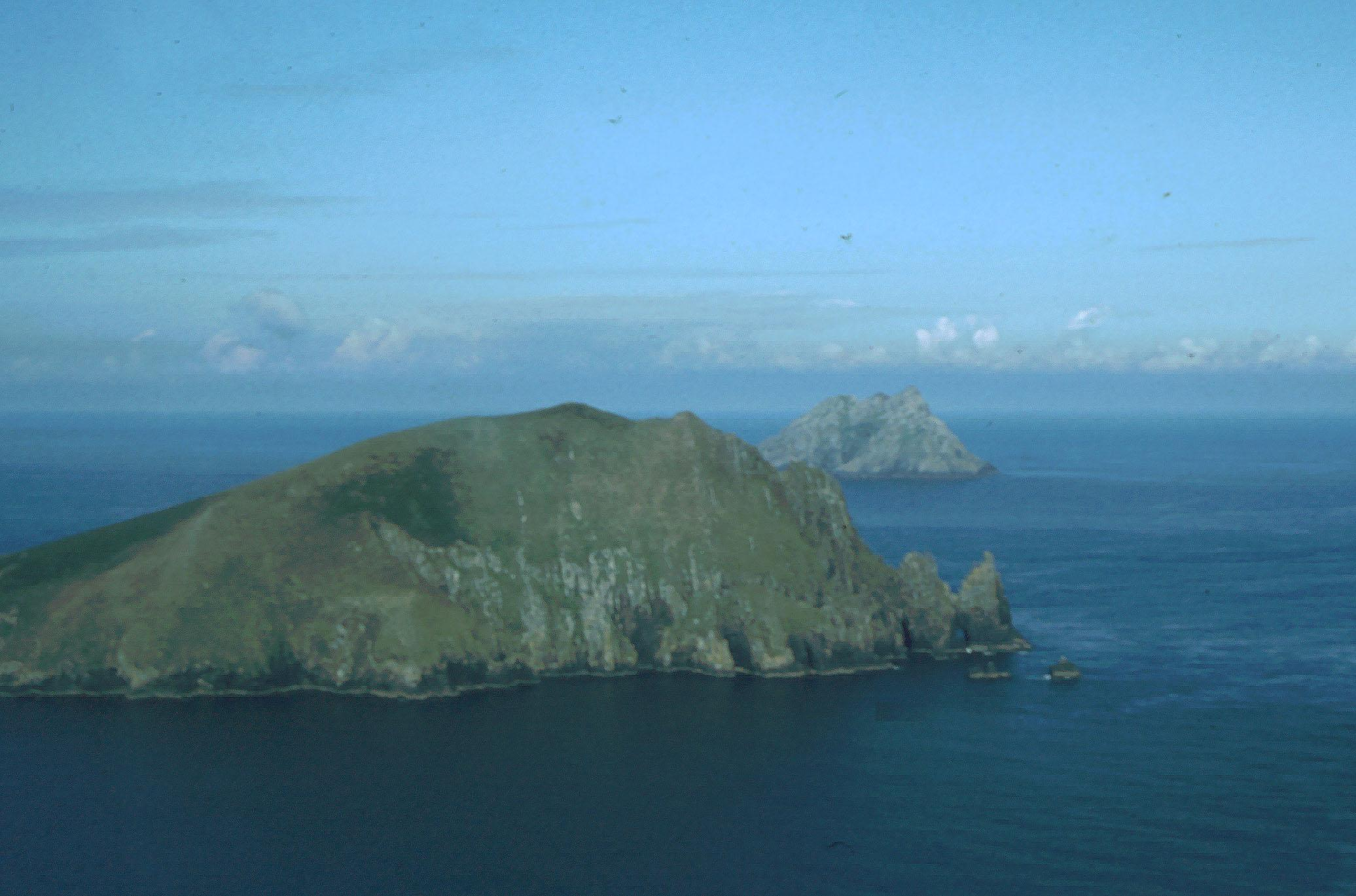
- Inishnabro, with Tearaght Island behind

- Location within island of Ireland

Geography
- Coordinates: 52.05786°N 10.60913°W
- Archipelago: Blasket Islands
- Area: 121 acres (49 ha)
- Highest elevation: 229 m (751 ft)

Administration
- Ireland
- County: Kerry

Demographics
- Population: 0 (2016)

Inishnabro (Irish: Inis na Bró, meaning 'island of the quern/bottom grind stone') is one of the Blasket Islands of County Kerry in Ireland.

== Geography ==
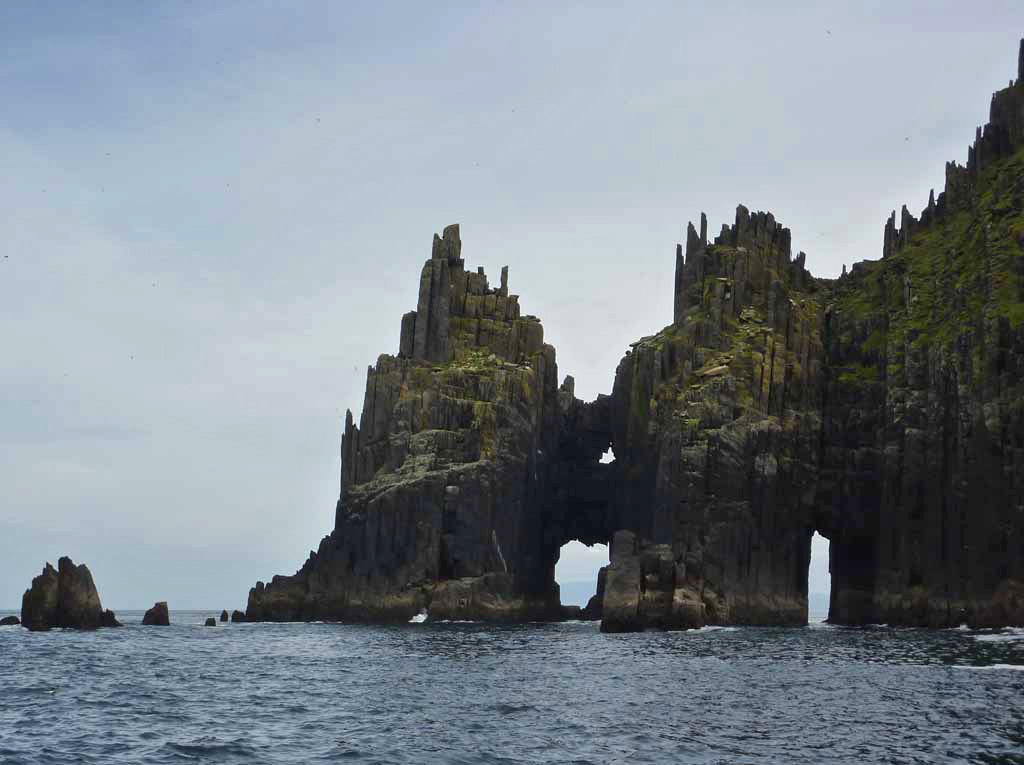
The Cathedral Rocks on the island's northern coast

Inishnabro is separated from Inishvickillane by a narrow sound (about 200 metres), and rises to 229 metres, and has an area of 49.15 hectares.

== Spaceport proposal ==
In 1973, an American scientist, Gary Hudson, approached the Industrial Development Authority and then the Irish Consul General in Chicago, Sean Farrell, to propose using Inishnabro as the launching site for a new commercial space shuttle. Hudson said he represented a group including British astronomer Fred Hoyle, an American astronaut who had walked on the Moon, and others. In a memorandum to the Irish Department of Foreign Affairs, Farrell wrote that his initial reaction was "one bordering on disbelief" but then concluded that Hudson was "genuine enough". Department officials, however, concluded that "Whatever his objective may be it is apparent that the scheme he propounded to Mr Farrell in Chicago belongs mainly to the realms of science fiction" and that it could be "a gigantic leg-pull". The proposal only became public in 2004 when Irish state papers from the period were released under the thirty-year rule.
