= Beginish house =

Stone house and Irish national monument in County Kerry, Ireland

- Teachín Bheiginse (Irish)
- Beiginis house
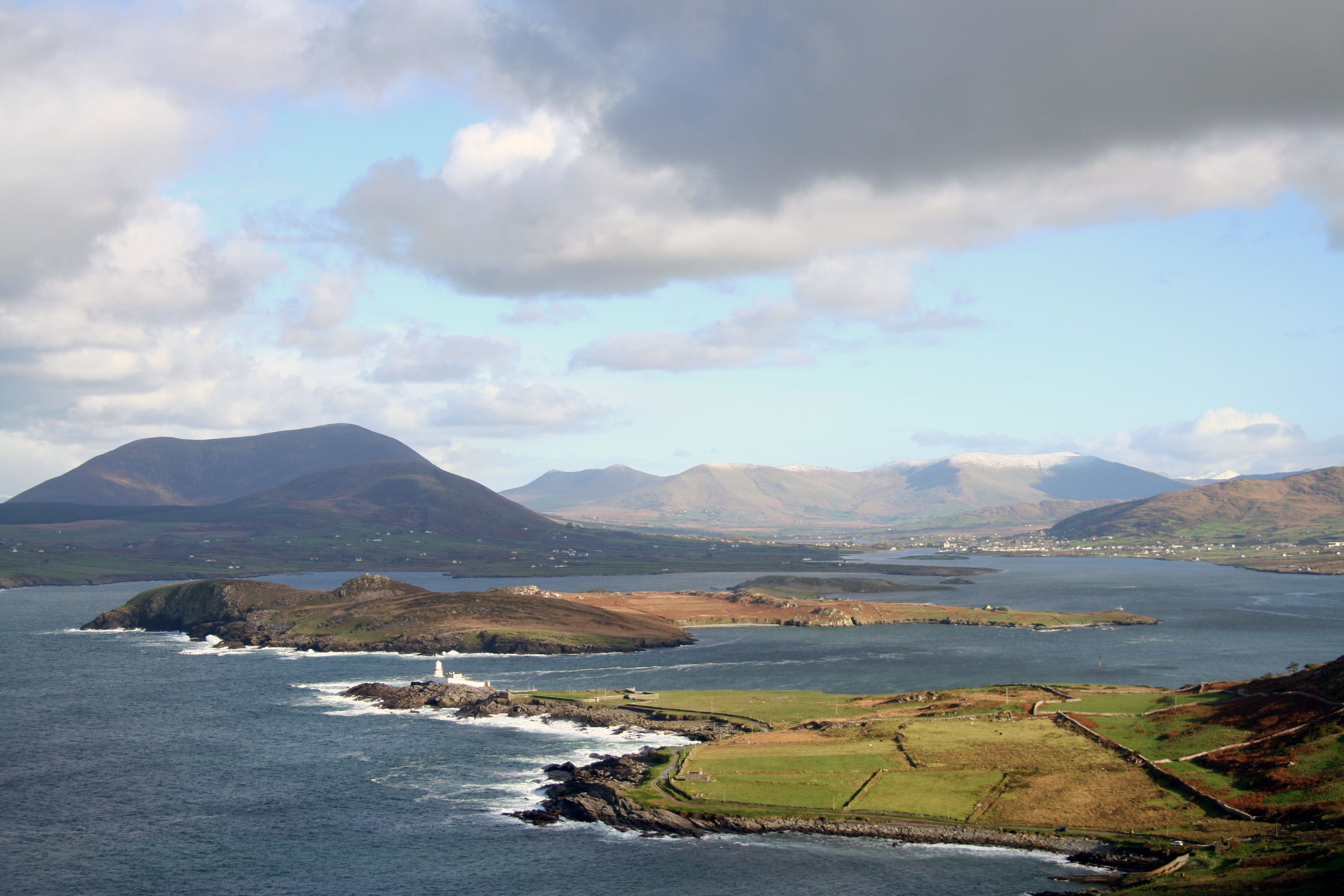
- View over Beginish Island; the Viking house is visible as a stone ring at centre

- Location within Ireland
- 51.938991°N 10.289963°W
- Etymology: "little island"
- Location: County Kerry
- Nearest city: Cahersiveen

History
- Built: c. 9th century AD

Site notes
- Elevation: 13 m (43 ft)
- Owner: In state guardianship

National monument of Ireland
- Official name: Beginish Stone-built house
- Reference no.: 500

The Beginish house is a stone house and National Monument associated with the Viking period, located in County Kerry, Ireland.

== Location ==
The Beginish house is located in Canroe (An Ceann Rua, "the red headland"), on the eastern part of Beginish Island, in Valentia Harbour.

== History ==
The settlement at Beginish was inhabited by Vikings between the 9th and 12th centuries AD.

== Description ==
8 stone houses were associated with field systems, 8 cairns and 15 animal shelters.

A runic inscription was found used as lintel for a house, and a bone pin and comb were found.
