= Beiginis =

Island in Ireland

Native name: Beiginis
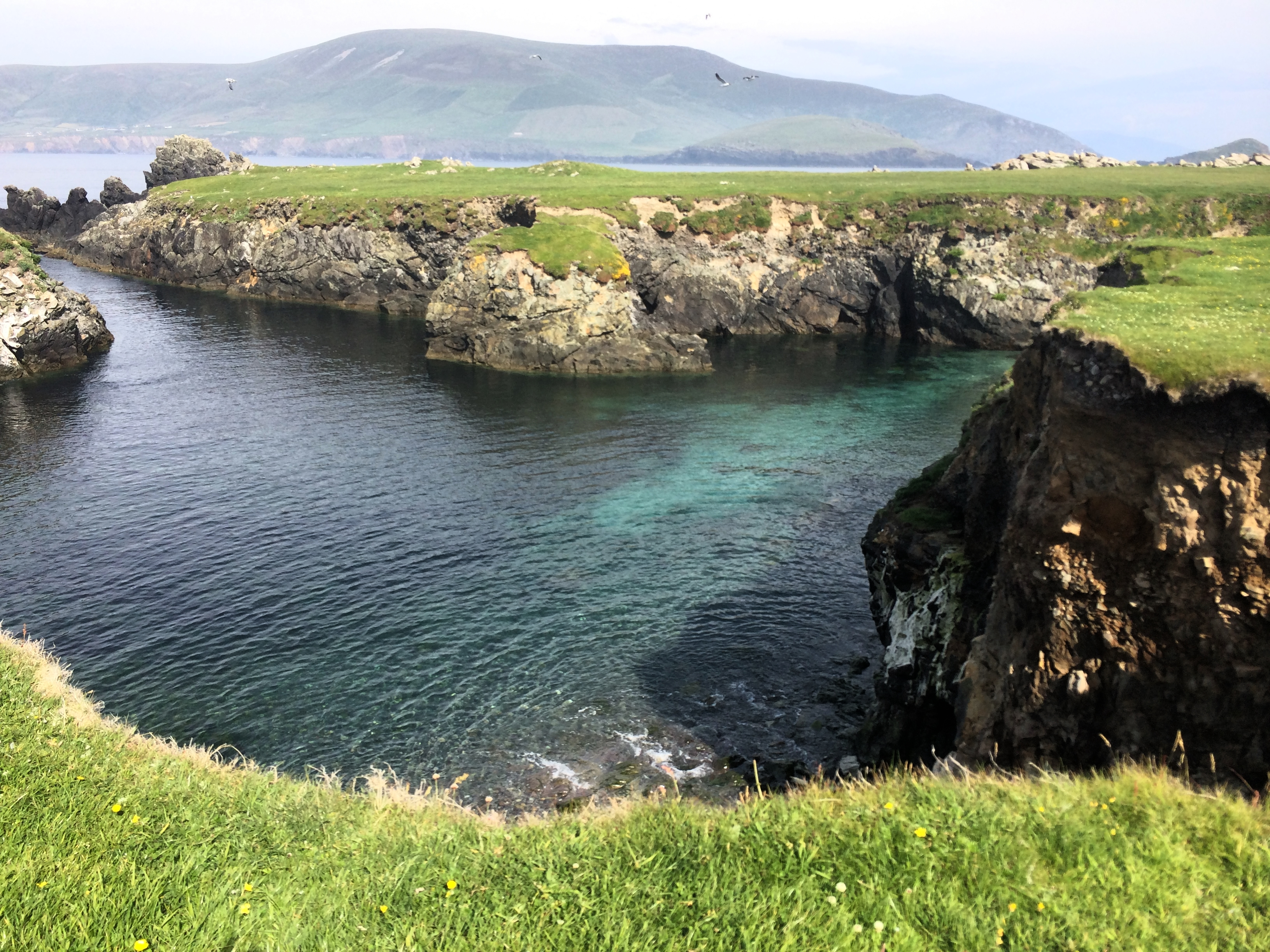
- Cove on Beginish Island

- Location within island of Ireland

Geography
- Location: Atlantic Ocean
- Coordinates: 52°06′56″N 10°30′26″W
- Area: 34 acres (14 ha)
- Highest elevation: 14 m (46 ft)

Administration
- Ireland
- Province: Munster
- County: Kerry

Demographics
- Population: 0

Beginish (from Irish Beiginis, meaning 'little island') is one of the Blasket Islands of County Kerry, Ireland.

== Geography ==
It is a low-lying island (14 metres high) with an area of 13.8 hectares in Blasket Sound, between Great Blasket Island and the mainland. It has a large colony of Arctic terns. The island is also the main birthing site for grey seals.

There is at least one other island in County Kerry called Beginish: it lies at the mouth of the River Ferta about 1 km from Valentia Island. The Island lies to the north of Valentia Harbour.

== See also ==
- Beginish Island in Valentia Harbour
