= George Derwent Thomson =

British classical scholar and philosopher (1903–1987)

George Derwent Thomas
- Seoirse Mac Tomáis
- Born: 19 August 1903; West Dulwich, London, England
- Died: 3 February 1987 (aged 83); Birmingham, England
- Education: King's College, Cambridge; Trinity College Dublin
- Occupation: Professor
- Employer: University of Birmingham
- Spouse: Katherine (wife)
- Children: de:Margaret Alexiou

George Derwent Thomson (Irish: Seoirse Mac Tomáis; 19 August 1903 – 3 February 1987) was a British classical scholar, Marxist philosopher, and scholar of the Irish language.

== Classical scholar ==
Thomson studied Classics at King's College, Cambridge, where he attained First Class Honours in the Classical Tripos and subsequently won a scholarship to Trinity College, Dublin. At TCD he worked on his first book, Greek Lyric Metre, and began visiting Na Blascaodaí in the early nineteen-twenties. He became a lecturer and then professor of Greek at University College Galway.

He moved back to England in 1934, when he returned to King's College, Cambridge, to lecture in Greek. He became a professor at Birmingham University in 1936, the year he joined the Communist Party of Great Britain. Thomson pioneered a Marxist interpretation of Greek drama. His Aeschylus and Athens (1941) and Marxism and Poetry (1945) won him international attention. In the latter book, he argued a connection between the work song and poetry; and that pre-industrial songs were connected to ritual. Richard Seaford has written that Thomson was 'the greatest Hellenist of his generation'.

Thomson befriended and was an important influence on Alfred Sohn-Rethel and his theory of the genesis of occidental thought in Ancient Greece through the invention of coining. He was also a friend of Ludwig Wittgenstein.

== Connections with the Blasket Islands ==
He first visited Na Blascaodaí (the Blasket Islands) off the west coast of Ireland in 1923. Mac Tomáis, as he quickly became known to the islanders, had attended rudimentary Irish classes at a branch of Conradh na Gaeilge in London before he went to Cambridge. When he arrived on the island, he immersed himself in the language. In six weeks of walking around, talking with Muiris Ó Súilleabháin and others, Mac Tomáis achieved near complete fluency in the language.

He spent several years with the people of the islands studying their language, history and culture. He maintained a special study of the now-extinct community in Ireland, in which he perceived elements of surviving cultural resonances with historical society prior to the development of private property as a means of production. He became a champion of the Irish language.

He had a role in the publication of the memoirs of Muiris Ó Súilleabháin, Fiche Bliain Ag Fás (Twenty Years Growing) in 1933. The introduction to Ó Súilleabháin's autobiography by E. M. Forster can also be attributed to Thomson.

When he applied for the new position of lecturer of Greek in NUI Galway in 1931 he, in the words of Richard Roche, 'astonished the interview board with a flow of Blasket Irish' and was awarded the post.

== Communism ==
In 1951, he was the only member of the Communist Party's Executive Committee to vote against the Party's programme The British Road to Socialism, because "the dictatorship of the proletariat was missing". He also served on the Party's Cultural Committee.

The Chinese Communist Revolution of 1949 had a profound effect on him and led to differences with the British Communist Party, from which he eventually drifted. He never lost his political beliefs. He was committed to working class education, including giving lectures to factory workers at Birmingham's Austin car plant. He also maintained a special affection and support for the Morning Star in his later years.

Thomson authored three popular expositions on Marxism published by the China Policy Study Group in the early 1970s. From Marx to Mao Tse-tung: A study in revolutionary dialectics (1971); Capitalism and After: The rise and fall of commodity production (1973); and The Human Essence: The sources of science and art (1974). He is also the author of Marxism and Poetry (1945).

== Personal life ==
Thomson married Katherine, daughter of Hugh Fraser and Jessie Stewart. He died in Birmingham.
