= Inishtooskert =

Island in County Kerry, Ireland

Inis Tuaisceart
Native name: Inis Tuaisceart
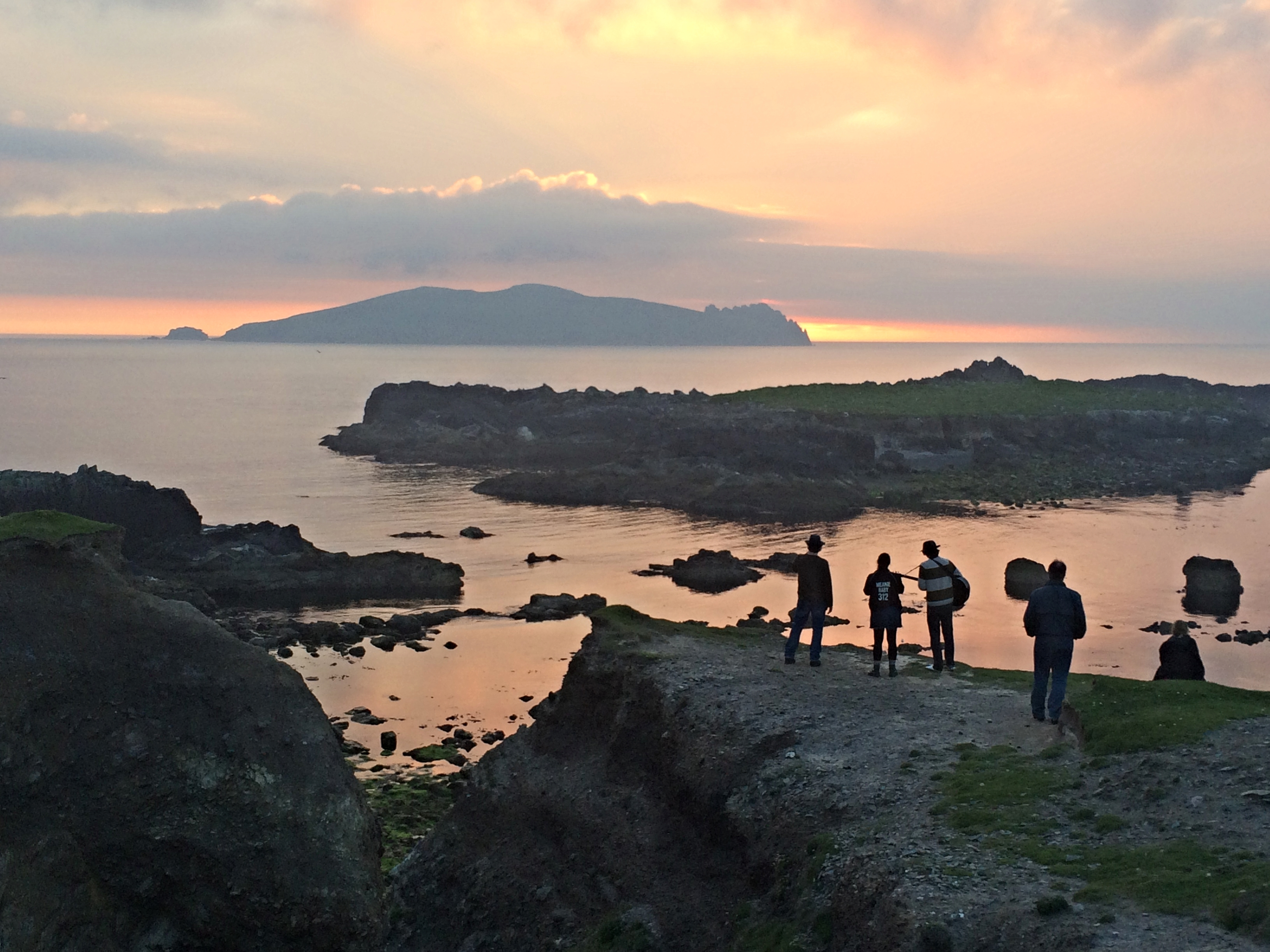
- Sunset over Inis Tuaisceart, from Great Blasket

- Location within island of Ireland

Geography
- Location: Atlantic Ocean
- Coordinates: 52.13045°N 10.57831°W
- Archipelago: Blasket Islands
- Area: 241 acres (98 ha)
- Highest elevation: 226 m (741 ft)

Administration
- Ireland
- Province: Munster
- County: Kerry

Demographics
- Population: 0

Inis Tuaisceart (sometimes spelled Inishtooshkert) (Inis Tuaisceart in Irish) is the northernmost of the Blasket Islands, County Kerry, Ireland.

== Etymology ==
The Irish name means "northern island" and the English name is a phonetic spelling of the Irish name. The island is also known as An Fear Marbh (the dead man) or the sleeping giant due to its appearance when seen from the east (as in the photograph).

== Nature ==
Inishtooskert holds important seabird colonies, as well as extensive ruins of ancient stone buildings.

Of particular note is the colony of European storm-petrels. With over 27,000 pairs in 2000 (Seabird 2000 survey), this is the largest colony in Ireland.

== In culture ==
The island appears frequently in David Lean's 1970 film Ryan's Daughter.

== Photo gallery ==
The northern cliffs of Inishtooskert

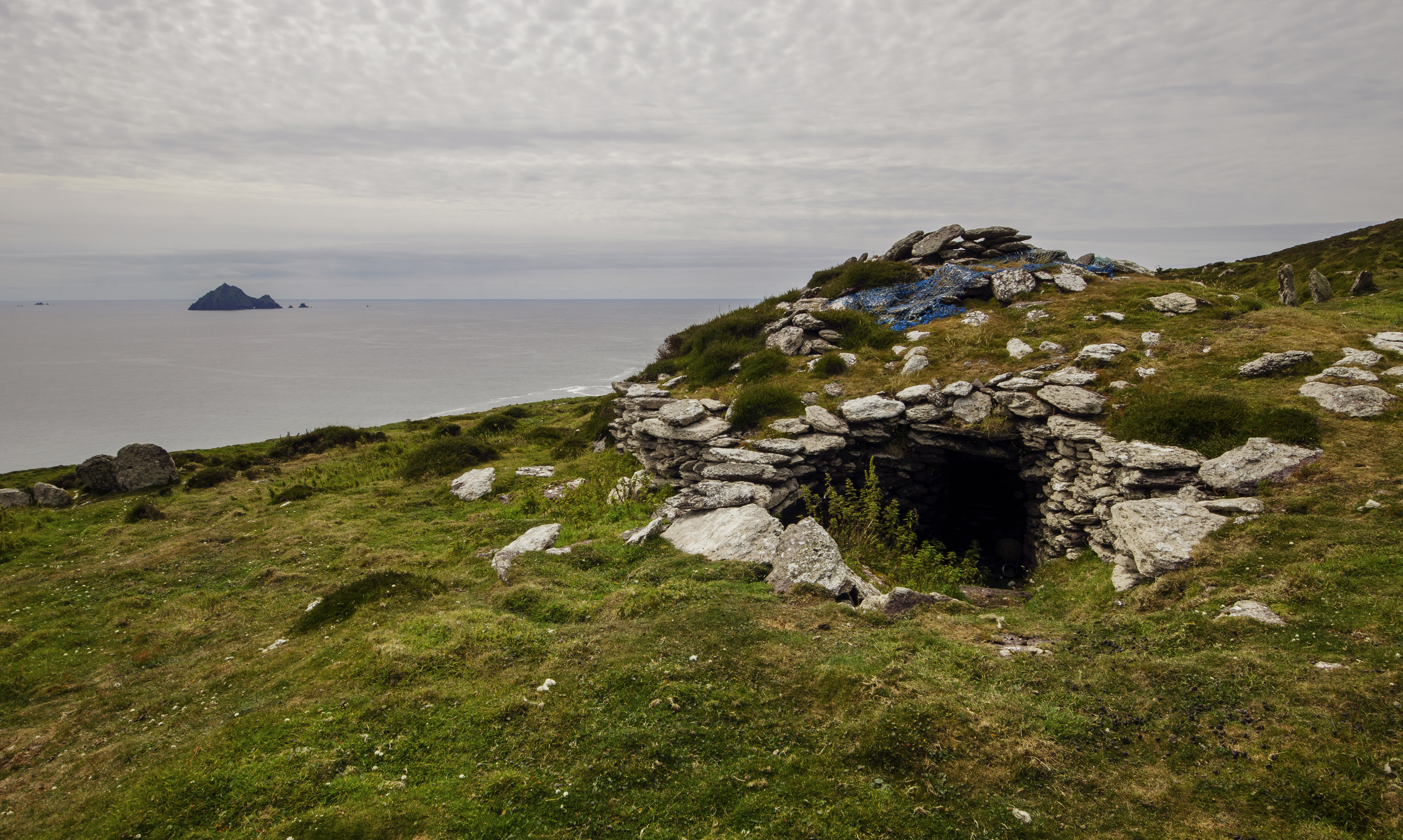
Early Medieval ecclesiastical site on the island

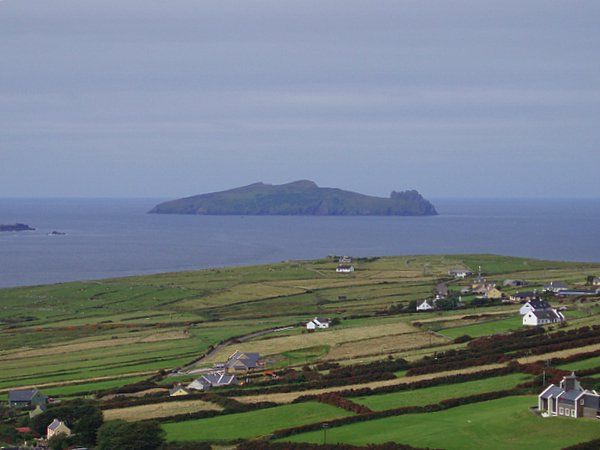
Inishtooskert seen from the mainland

== See also ==
- Spanish Armada in Ireland
