= Beginish Island =

Place in Ireland

Native name: Beiginis
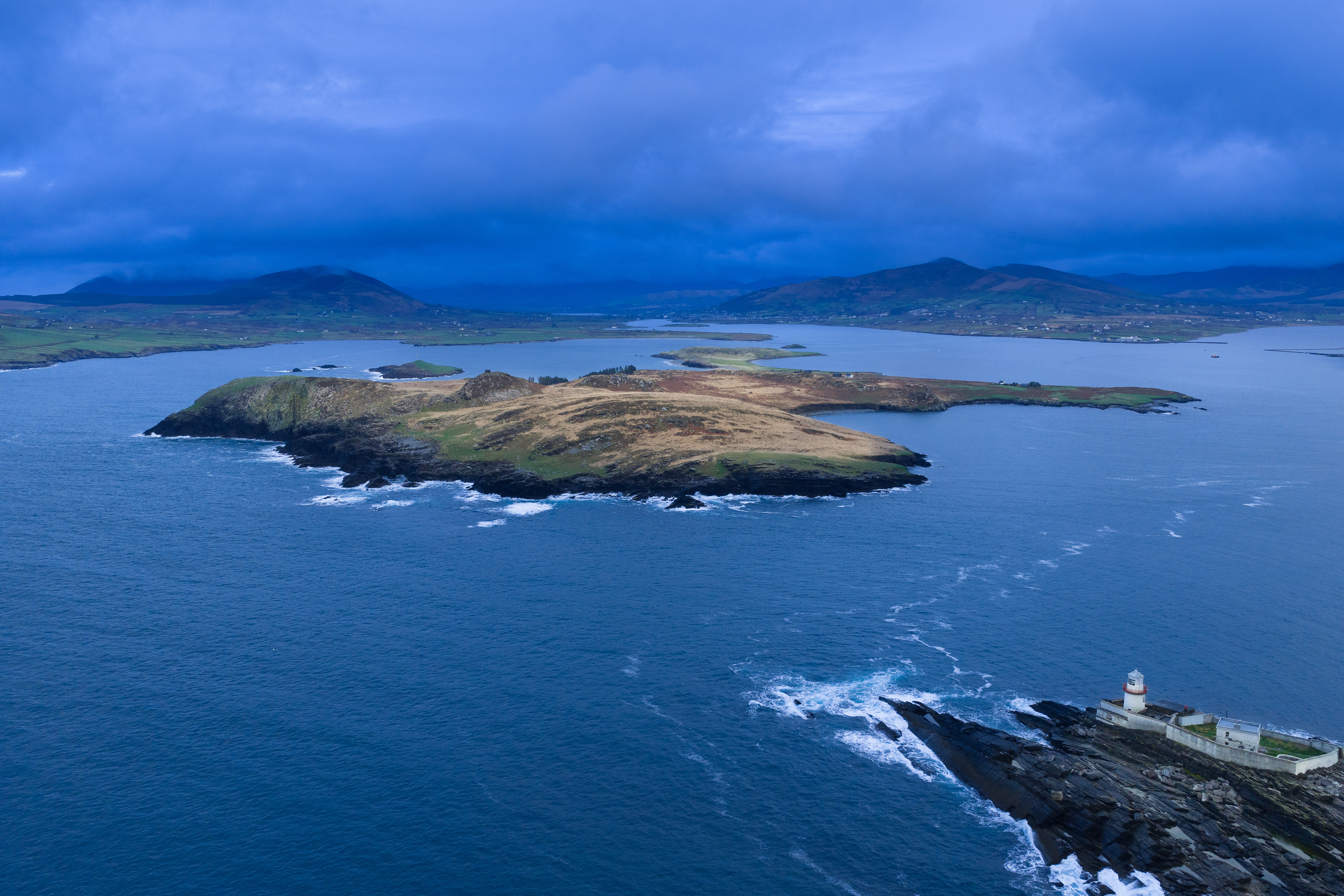
- North-western aerial view of the island, with Valentia lighthouse visible

- Location within island of Ireland

Geography
- Location: Atlantic Ocean
- Coordinates: 51°56′N 10°18′W

Administration
- Ireland
- Province: Munster
- County: Kerry

Demographics
- Population: 0

Beginish (from Irish Beiginis, meaning 'small island') is an island in Valentia Harbour, in south west County Kerry, Ireland.

== Geography ==
Dominating the northern skyline is Doulus Head and Killelan mountain, with Valentia island to the south and Ballycarbery to the east. The north west of the island faces out to the Atlantic ocean and Dingle bay. Surrounding Beginish are other small islands, including Lamb Island to the north and Church Island to the east. Church Island is notable for having the remains of a monastic settlement with an oratory and hut, holy well and shrine. On the northern edge of the island is a series of columnar basalt cliffs which have a hexagonal shape formed in a similar manner to the famous Giant's Causeway.

The island is used for sheep farming and some small scale forestry.

== History ==
The island has numerous archaeological sites. A Viking settlement was occupied between the 9th and 12th centuries, which consisted of a group of 8 houses, 15 cairns with a network of small fields enclosed by low stone walls and numerous middens. This site was excavated by archaeologist Michael J. O'Kelly in the 1950s, with further analysis conducted by John Sheehan more recently.

The main dwelling currently visible was dated to the 11th century AD and is of Scandinavian-Irish origin. This circular building (6.75m in diameter) has a sunken floor 1.5 m below the surface with walls of dry masonry. It was originally covered with a thatched roof, the beams of which were held by holes in the wall. The 1.85 m long, 0.45 m wide and 0.1 m thick lintel is made of sandstone. A small cross and a rune inscription are carved into its surface, which says: "Verr erected this stone and Munulfr carved the runes". This lintel is now in the Cork Public Museum.

Occupying the highest point on the western end of the island is a block hut known locally as "Pilots lookout". This was used in the 19th and early 20th century to spot ships coming into Dingle Bay which may have required piloting into Valentia Harbour.

Beginish Island is currently uninhabited.

Historical population

Year	Pop.	±%
1841	84	—
1851	36	−57.1%
1901	44	+22.2%
1951	14	−68.2%
1956	13	−7.1%
1961	10	−23.1%
1966	6	−40.0%
1971	2	−66.7%

Year	Pop.	±%
1979	2	+0.0%
1986	2	+0.0%
1991	5	+150.0%
1996	2	−60.0%
2002	0	−100.0%
2006	0	0.00%
2011	0	0.00%

Source: "CNA17: Population by Off Shore Island, Sex and Year".

== Environment ==
Beginish is host to a seal colony located in a cove on the southern part of the island named Casey's landing, and has abundant bird and sea life.

== Notable people ==
The family of legendary Kerry Gaelic footballer Mick O'Connell came from Beginish.

== See also ==
- Beiginis
