= Tearaght Island =

Island off the Dingle Peninsula, Ireland

Native name: an Tiaracht
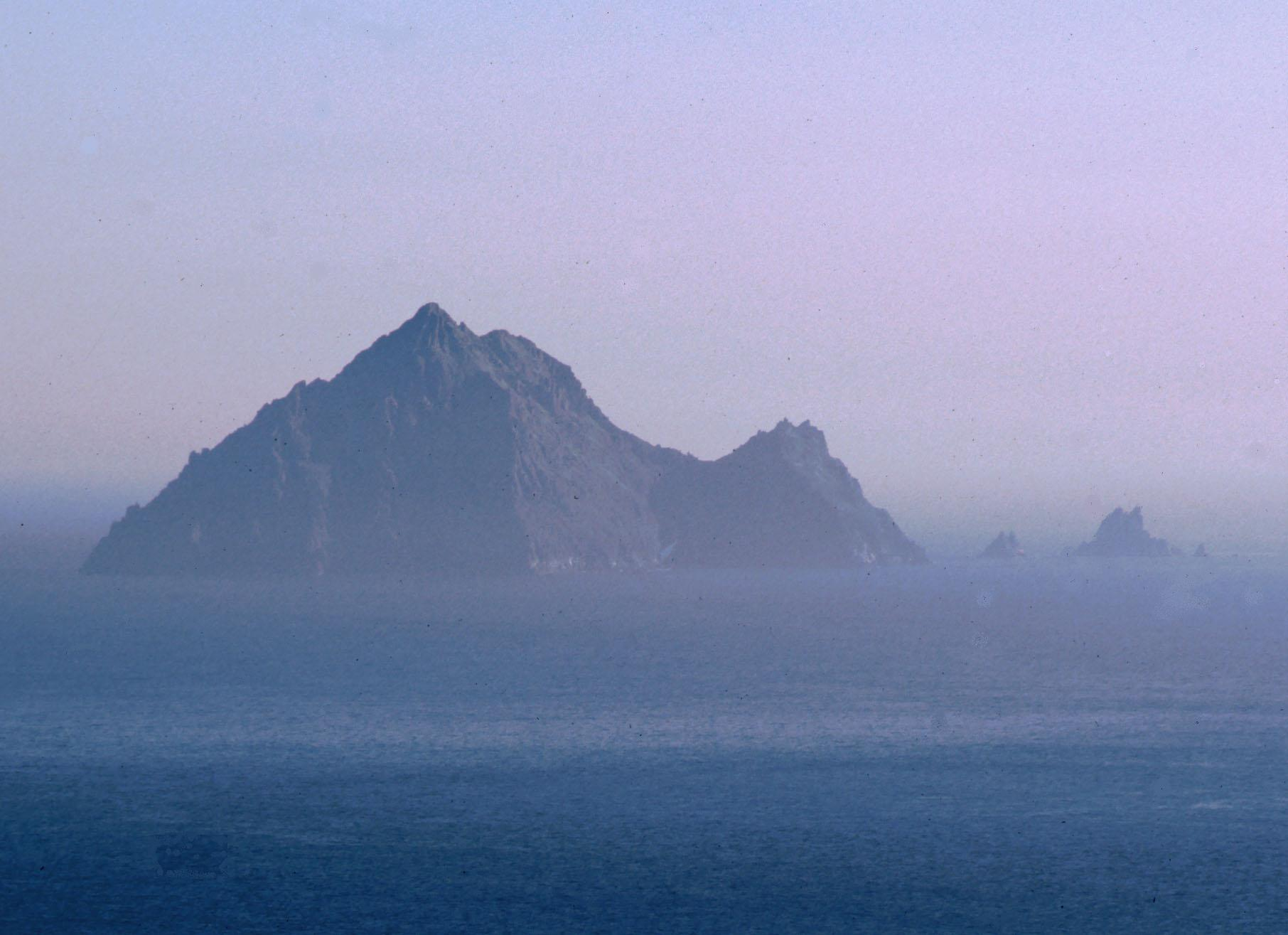
- An Tiaracht seen from Inis Tuaisceart

- Location within island of Ireland

Geography
- Location: Atlantic Ocean
- Coordinates: 52°4′32.4″N 10°39′4.6″W
- Archipelago: Blasket Islands
- Area: 57 acres (23 ha)
- Highest elevation: 254 m (833 ft)

Administration
- Ireland
- Province: Munster
- County: Kerry

Demographics
- Population: 0 (2016)
- Pop. density: 0/km^{2} (0/sq mi)

Tearaght Island or Inishtearaght (Irish: An Tiaracht, meaning 'the westerly') is an uninhabited steep rocky island west of the Dingle Peninsula in County Kerry, Ireland.

== Geography ==
At longitude 10° 39.7' Tearaght is the westernmost of the Blasket Islands, and thus the westernmost island of Ireland. It is also one of the westernmost points in Europe after Iceland, and Azores. However, there are some exposed rocks further west: Tearaght Rocks, Tearaght Rocks West (10° 41.0'), and Foze Rocks (10° 41.3').

An Tiaracht is about a kilometre from east to west, and 500 metres (1,600 feet) from north to south. The island is divided into two sections, a larger eastern part (254 metres (833 feet) high) and a western part that rises to 116 metres (381 feet). A narrow neck of rock, with a natural tunnel through it, joins the two parts.

== Demographics ==
Historical population

Year	Pop.	±%
1841	0	—
1851	0	0.00%
1861	0	0.00%
1871	4	—
1881	13	+225.0%
1891	10	−23.1%
1901	3	−70.0%
1911	3	+0.0%

Year	Pop.	±%
1926	3	+0.0%
1936	3	+0.0%
1946	3	+0.0%
1951	3	+0.0%
1956	3	+0.0%
1961	3	+0.0%
1966	3	+0.0%
1971	5	+66.7%

Year	Pop.	±%
1979	3	−40.0%
1981	3	+0.0%
1986	3	+0.0%
1991	0	−100.0%
1996	0	0.00%
2002	0	0.00%
2006	0	0.00%
2016	0	0.00%

Source: Central Statistics Office. "CNA17: Population by Off Shore Island, Sex and Year". CSO.ie.

== Nature ==
Like the other Blasket Islands, Tiaracht holds large numbers of seabirds, with internationally important populations of Manx shearwater and European storm-petrel. Leach's storm-petrels have also been found there (but not proved to be breeding) in recent years. The number of auks, especially puffins, has apparently fluctuated greatly, though early records are not always reliable.

== Inishtearaght Lighthouse ==
A lighthouse was established on the island in 1870, and automated in 1988. The lighthouse, maintained by the Commissioners of Irish Lights, has a tower 17 metres (56 feet) high and the focal height is at 84 metres (276 feet) above sea level, it has a range of 19 nautical miles (35 kilometres; 22 miles). The light was served by the steepest funicular rail track in Europe from 1913 until automation.

== Gallery ==
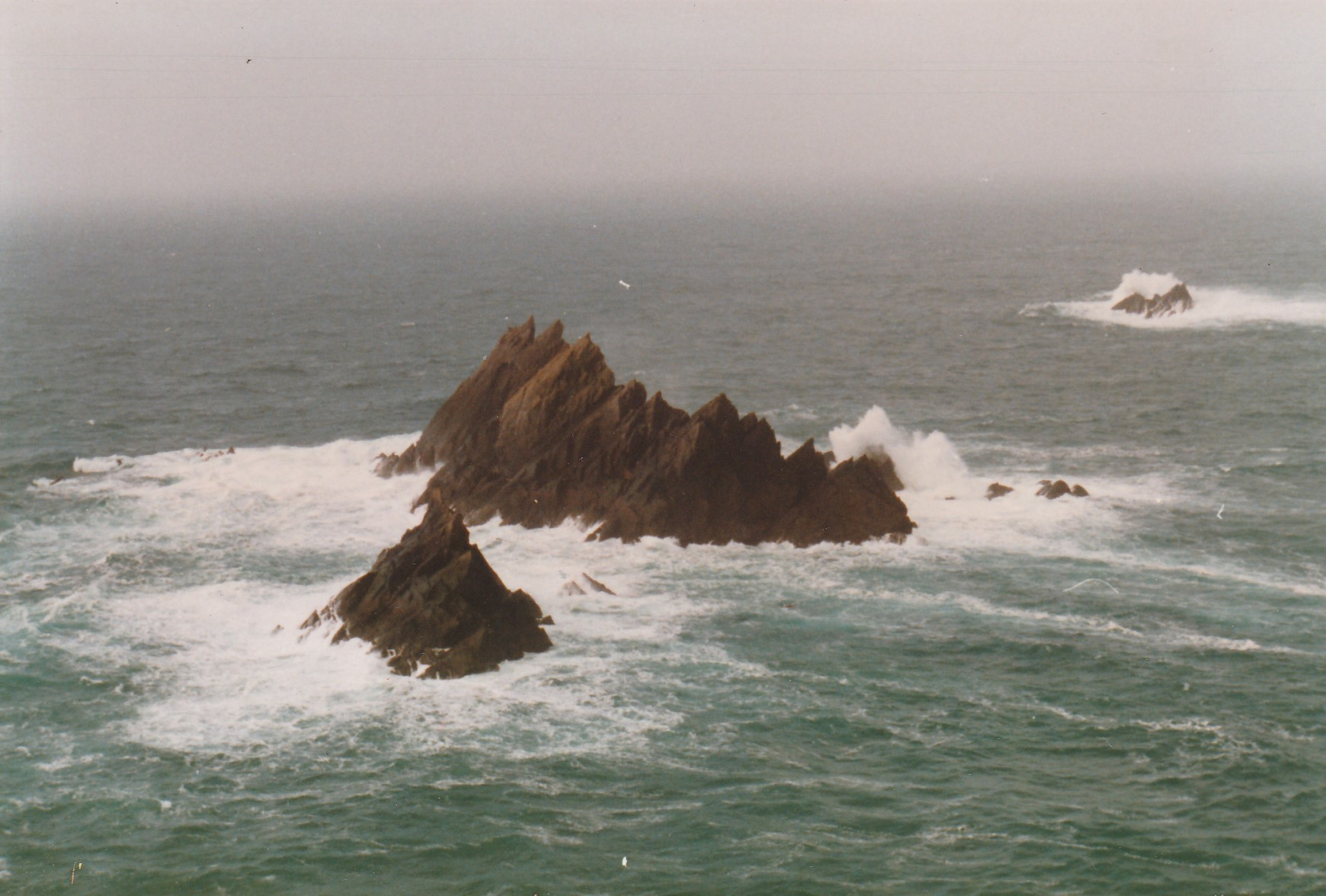
Rocks near the island

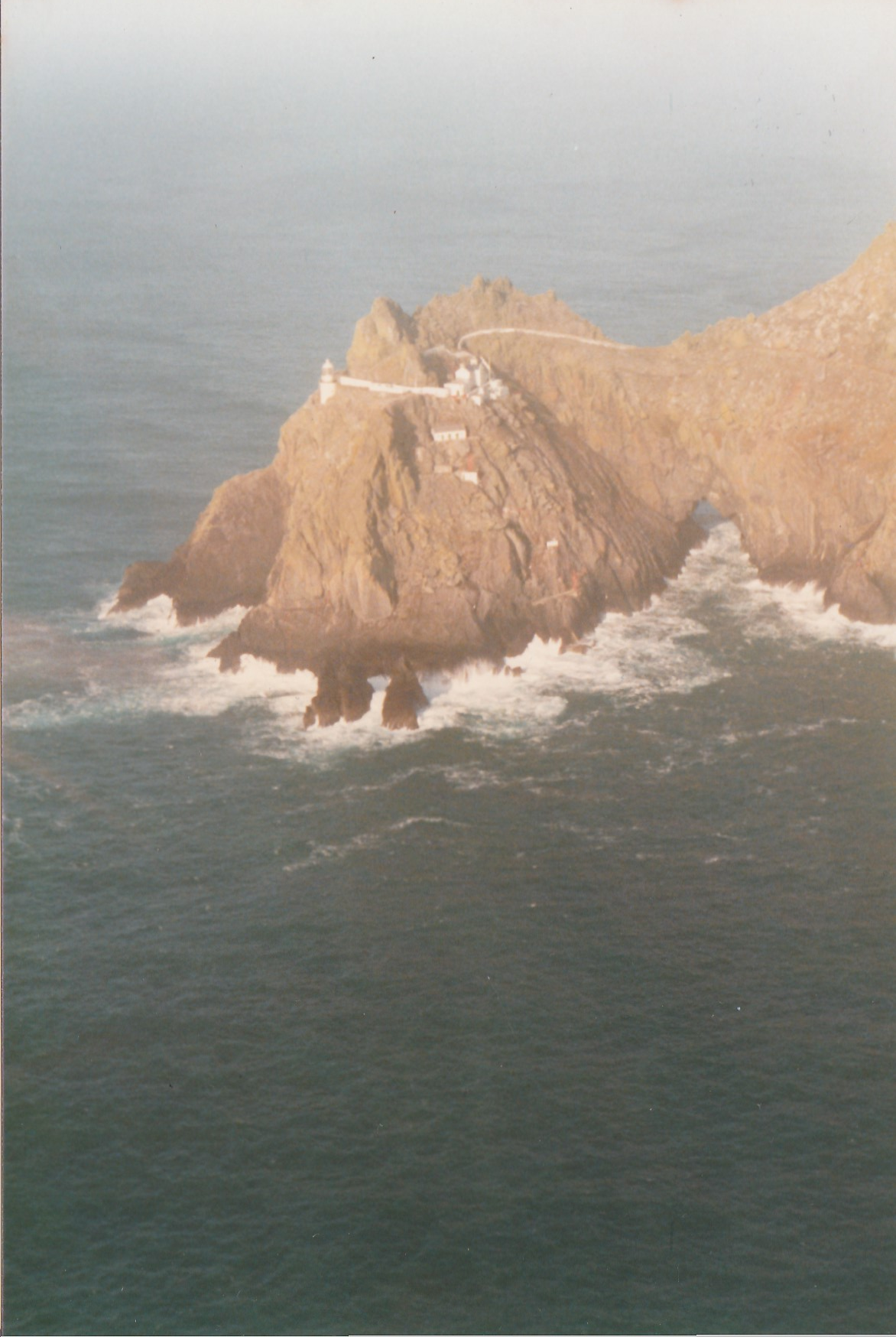
The lighthouse on the island

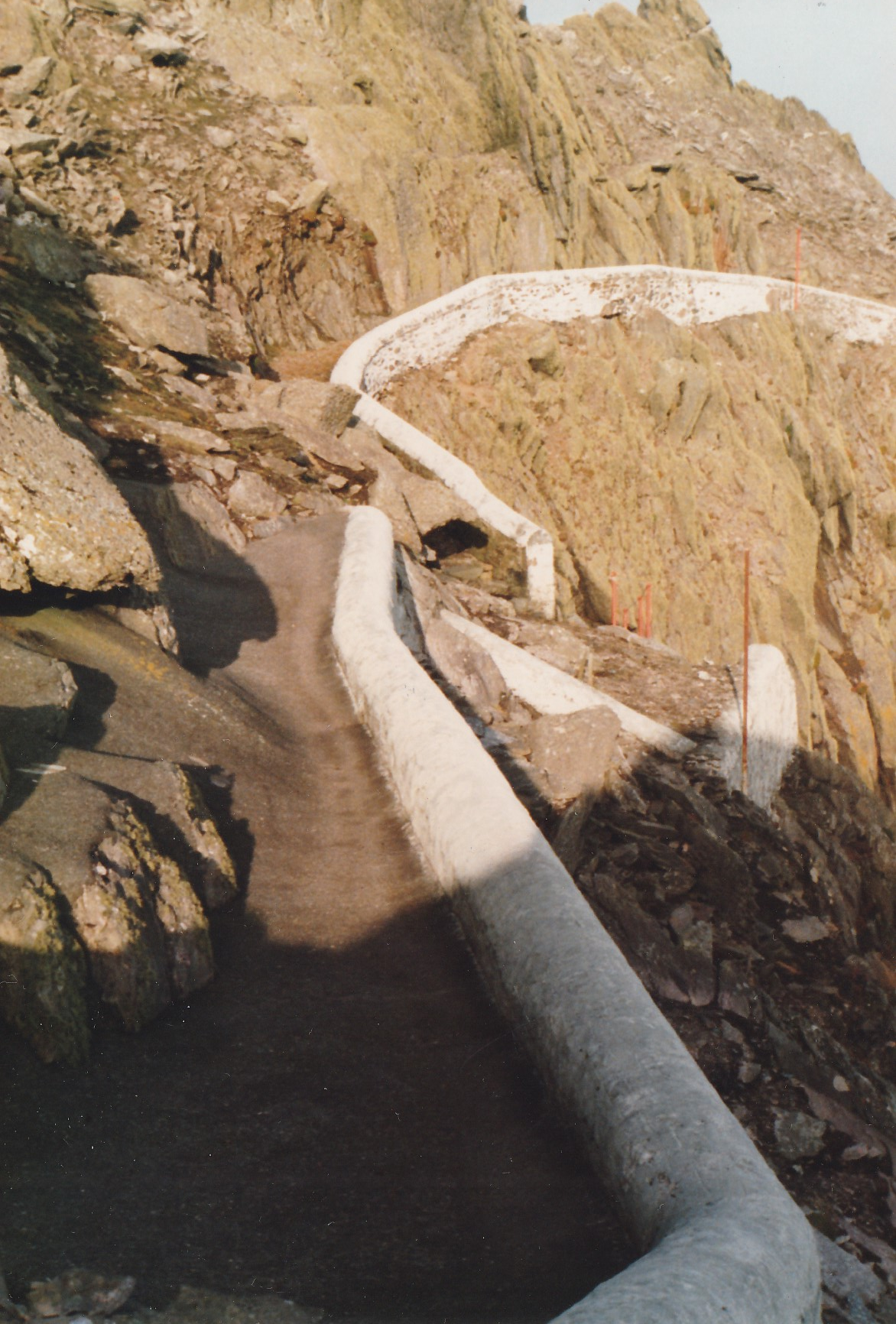
Channels used to funnel rainwater into tanks for storage

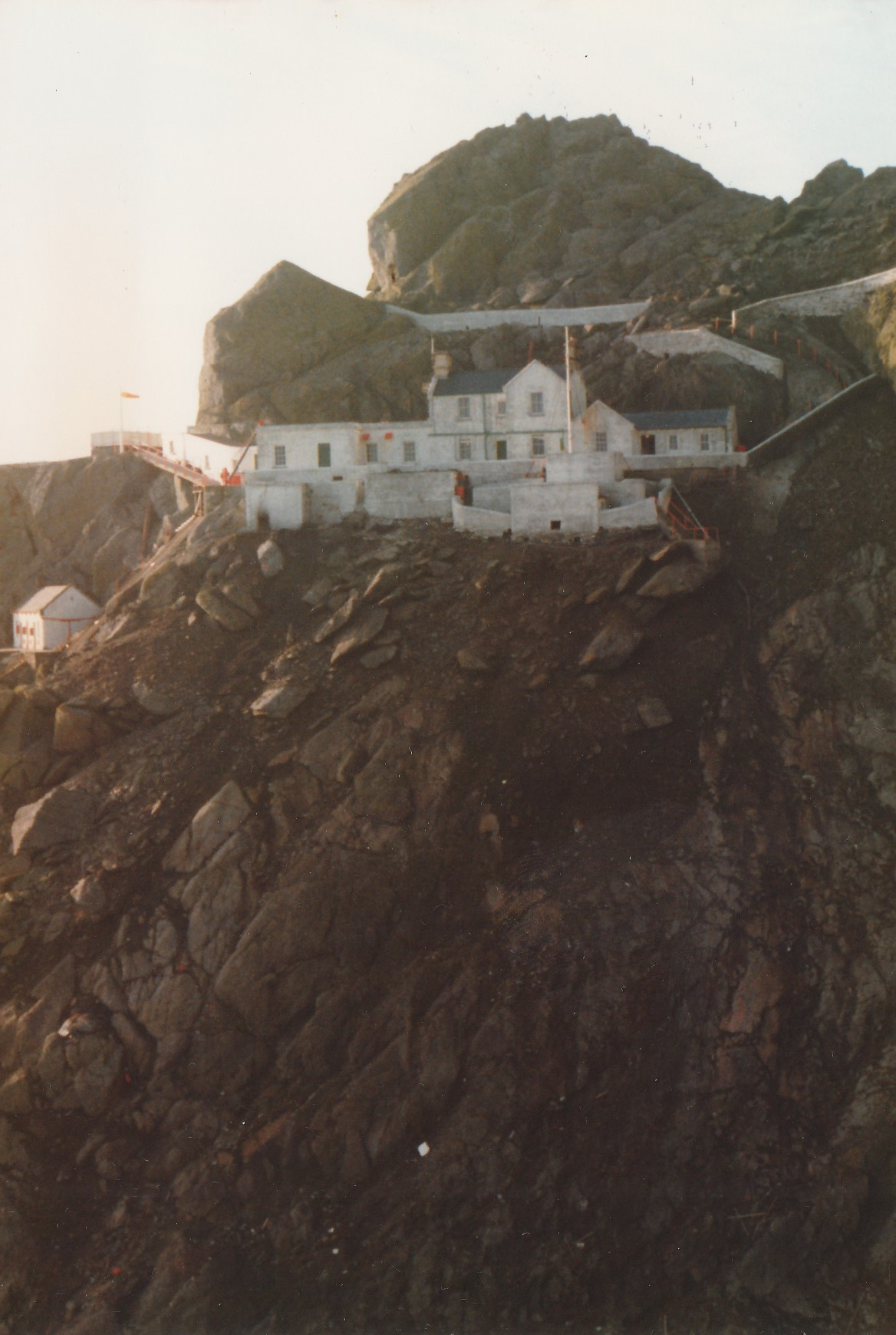
The lighthouse

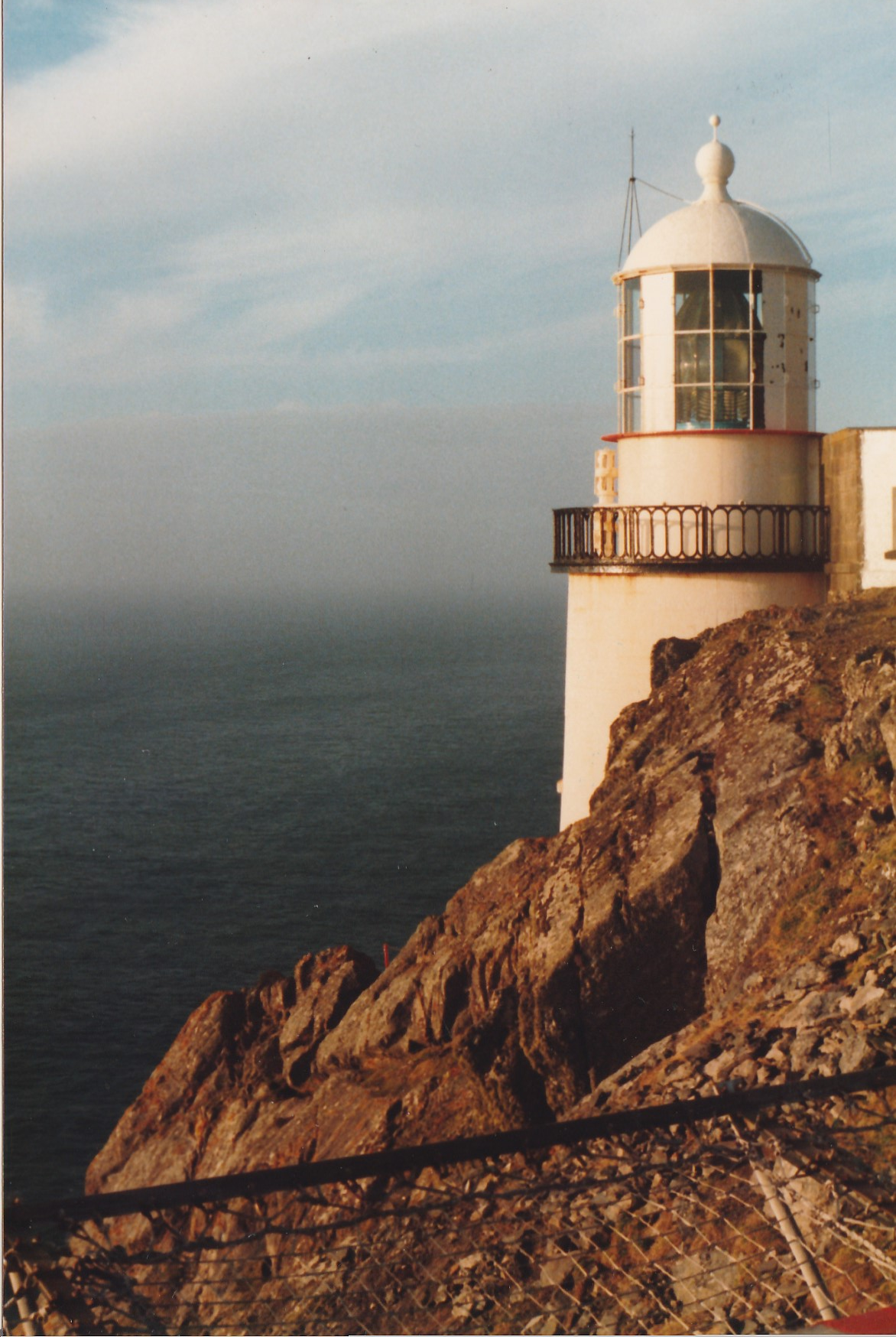
The lighthouse at sunset in 1987

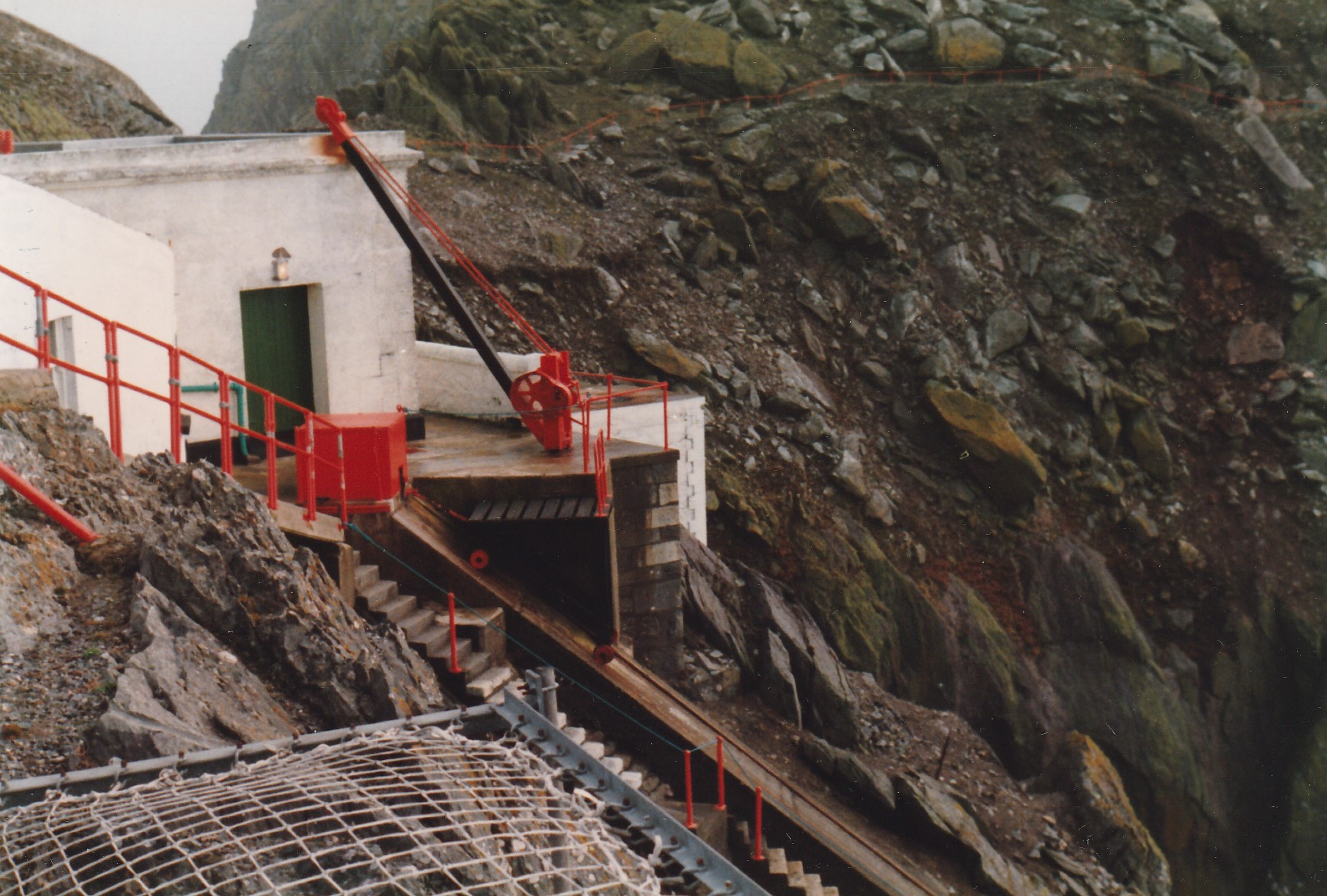
The top of a funicular railway for transporting materials from the boat landing up to the lighthouse

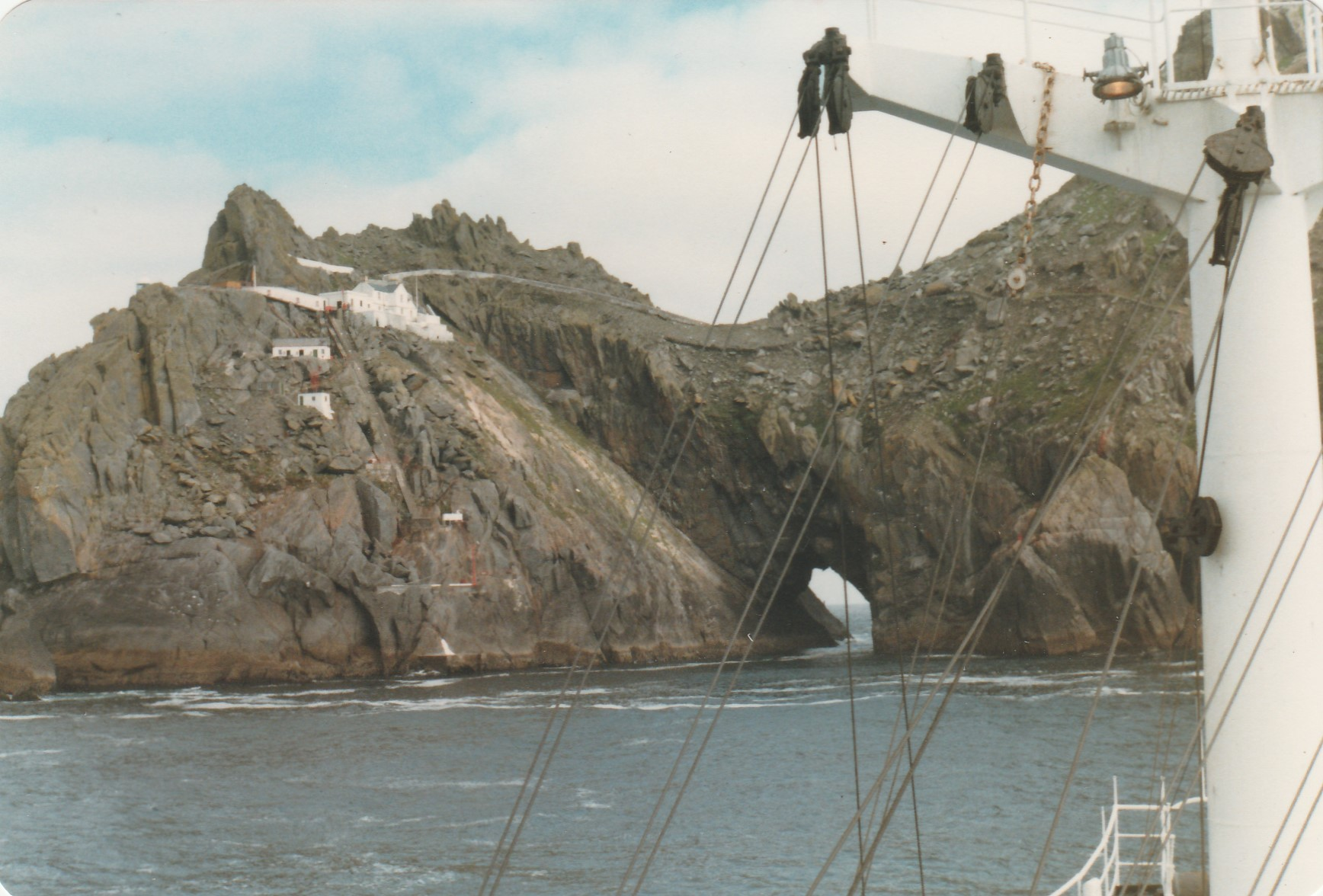
The lighthouse and sea arch

== See also ==
- Lighthouses in Ireland
- Extreme points of Europe
