= Ogham inscription =

Primitive Irish writings on standing stones

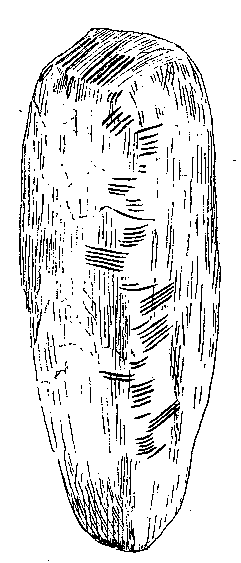
Ballaqueeney Ogham Stone from the Isle of Man showing the droim in centre. Text reads: BIVAIDONAS MAQI MUCOI CUNAVA[LI] ᚁᚔᚃᚐᚔᚇᚑᚅᚐᚄ ᚋᚐᚊᚔ ᚋᚒᚉᚑᚔ ᚉᚒᚅᚐᚃᚐ[ᚂᚔ], or in English: Bivaidonas, son of the tribe Cunava[li]

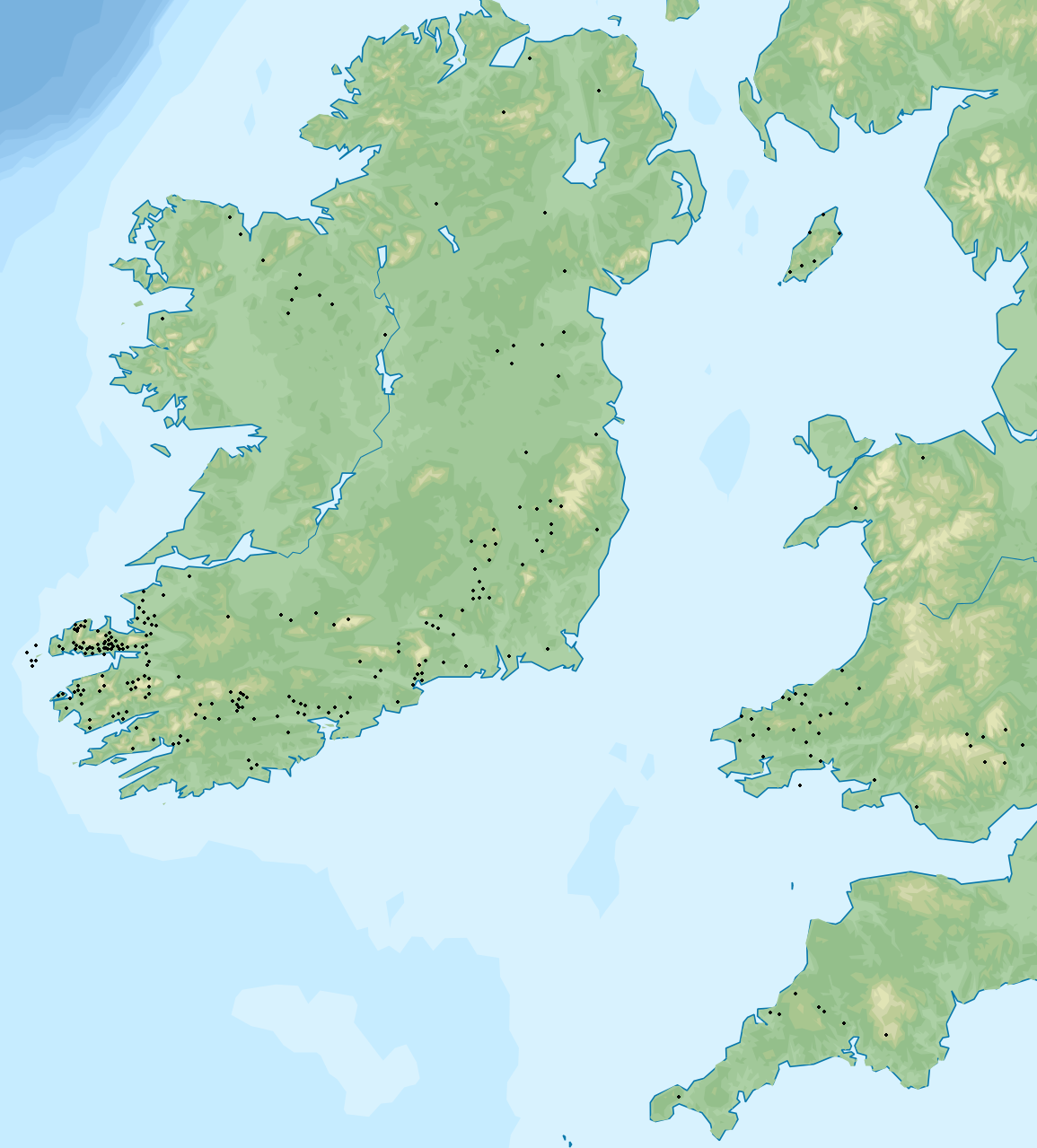
Map of Ireland, Isle of Man and Britain; black dots mark Ogham inscriptions.

Roughly 400 inscriptions in the ogham alphabet are known from stone monuments scattered around the Irish Sea, the bulk of them dating to the fifth and sixth centuries. The language of these inscriptions is predominantly Primitive Irish, but a few examples are fragments of the Pictish language. Ogham itself is an Early Medieval form of alphabet or cipher, sometimes also known as the "Celtic Tree Alphabet".

A number of different numbering schemes are used. The most common is after R. A. S. Macalister's Corpus Inscriptionum Insularum Celticarum (CIIC). This covers the inscriptions which were known by the 1940s. Another numbering scheme is given by the Celtic Inscribed Stones Project (CISP) and is based on the location of the stones; for example CIIC 1 = CISP INCHA/1. Macalister's (1945) numbers run from 1 to 507, including also Latin and Runic inscriptions, with three additional added in 1949. Sabine Ziegler (1994) lists 344 Gaelic ogham inscriptions known to Macalister (Ireland and Isle of Man), and seven additional inscriptions discovered later.

The inscriptions may be divided into "orthodox" and "scholastic" specimens. "Orthodox" inscriptions date to the Primitive Irish period, and record a name of an individual, either as a cenotaph or tombstone, or documenting land ownership. "Scholastic" inscriptions date from the medieval Old Irish period up to modern times.

The bulk of the surviving ogham inscriptions stretch in an arc from County Kerry (especially Corcu Duibne) in the south of Ireland across to Dyfed in south Wales. The remainder are, for the most part, found in south-eastern Ireland, eastern and northern Scotland, the Isle of Man, and England around the Devon/Cornwall border. The vast majority of the inscriptions consist of personal names, probably of the person commemorated by the monument.

== Orthodox inscriptions ==
In orthodox inscriptions, the script was carved into the edge (droim or faobhar) of the stone, which formed the stemline against which individual characters are cut. The text of these "Orthodox Ogham" inscriptions is read beginning from the bottom left side of a stone, continuing upward along the edge, across the top and down the right side (in the case of long inscriptions).

MacManus (1991) lists a total of 382 known Orthodox inscriptions. They are found in most counties of Ireland but are concentrated in southern Ireland, with the highest numbers found in County Kerry (130), Cork (84), and Waterford (48). Other counts are as follows: Kilkenny (14); Mayo (9); Kildare (8); Wicklow and Meath (5 each); Carlow (4); Wexford, Limerick, and Roscommon (3 each); Antrim, Cavan, Louth, and Tipperary (2 each); Armagh, Dublin, Fermanagh, Leitrim, Londonderry and Tyrone (1 each).

Other specimens are known from Wales (ca. 40); Pembrokeshire (16); Breconshire and Carmarthenshire (7 each); Glamorgan (4); Cardiganshire (3); Denbighshire (2); Powys (1), and Caernarvonshire (1)). A few are known of from sites in the Isle of Man (5), in England, such as Cornwall (5), Devon (2), and some doubtful examples from Scotland (possibly 2).

=== Formula words ===
The vast majority of inscriptions consists of personal names and use a series of formula words, usually describing the person's ancestry or tribal affiliation.

Formula words used include the following:

- MAQI ᚋᚐᚊᚔ – 'son' (Modern Irish mac)
- MUCOI ᚋᚒᚉᚑᚔ – 'tribe' or 'sept'
- ANM ᚐᚅᚋ – 'name' (Modern Irish ainm)
- AVI ᚐᚃᚔ – 'descendant' (Modern Irish uí)
- CELI ᚉᚓᚂᚔ – 'follower' or 'devotee' (Modern Irish céile)
- NETA ᚅᚓᚈᚐ – 'nephew' (Modern Irish nia)
- KOI ᚕᚑᚔ – 'here is' (equivalent to Latin HIC IACIT). KOI is unusual in that the K is always written using the first supplementary letter Ebad.

In order of frequency, the formula words are used as follows:

- X MAQI Y (X son of Y)
- X MAQI MUCOI Y (X son of the tribe Y)
- X MAQI Y MUCOI Z (X son of Y of the tribe Z)
- X KOI MAQI MUCOI Y (here is X son of the tribe Y)
- X MUCOI Y (X of the tribe Y)
- X MAQI Y MAQI MUCOI Z (X son of Y son of the tribe Z)
- Single name inscriptions with no accompanying formula word
- ANM X MAQI Y (Name X son of Y)
- ANM X (Name X )
- X AVI Y (X descendant of Y)
- X MAQI Y AVI Z (X son of Y descendant of Z)
- X CELI Y (X follower/devotee of Y)
- NETTA X (nephew/champion of X)

=== Nomenclature ===
The nomenclature of the Irish personal names is more interesting than the rather repetitive formulae and reveals details of early Gaelic society, particularly its warlike nature.

For example, two of the most commonly occurring elements in the names are CUNA ᚉᚒᚅᚐ – 'hound' or 'wolf' (Modern Irish cú) and CATTU ᚉᚐᚈᚈᚒ – 'battle' (Modern Irish cath).

These occur in names such as:

(300) CUNANETAS ᚉᚒᚅᚐᚅᚓᚈᚐᚄ – 'Champion of wolves'
(501) CUNAMAGLI ᚉᚒᚅᚐᚋᚐᚌᚂᚔ – 'prince of wolves'
(107) CUNAGUSSOS ᚉᚒᚅᚐᚌᚒᚄᚄᚑᚄ – '(he who is) strong as a wolf'
(250) CATTUVVIRR ᚉᚐᚈᚈᚒᚃᚃᚔᚏᚏ – 'man of battle'
(303) CATABAR ᚉᚐᚈᚐᚁᚐᚏ – 'chief in battle'
IVACATTOS ᚔᚃᚐᚉᚐᚈᚈᚑᚄ – 'yew of battle'

Other warlike names include:

(39) BRANOGENI ᚁᚏᚐᚅᚑᚌᚓᚅᚔ – 'born of raven'
(428) TRENAGUSU ᚈᚏᚓᚅᚐᚌᚒᚄᚒ – 'strong of vigour'
(504) BIVAIDONAS ᚁᚔᚃᚐᚔᚇᚑᚅᚐᚄ – 'alive like fire'

Elements that are descriptive of physical characteristics are also common, such as:

(368) VENDUBARI ᚃᚓᚅᚇᚒᚁᚐᚏᚔ – 'fair-headed'
(75) CASONI ᚉᚐᚄᚑᚅᚔ – 'curly headed one'
(119) DALAGNI ᚇᚐᚂᚐᚌᚅᚔ – 'one who is blind'
(46) DERCMASOC ᚇᚓᚏᚉᚋᚐᚄᚑᚉ – 'one with an elegant eye'
(60) MAILAGNI ᚋᚐᚔᚂᚐᚌᚅᚔ – 'bald/short haired one'
(239) GATTAGLAN ᚌᚐᚈᚈᚐᚌᚂᚐᚅ – 'wise and pure'

Other names indicate a divine ancestor. The god Lugh features in many names such as:

(4) LUGADDON ᚂᚒᚌᚌᚐᚇᚑᚅ
(286) LUGUDECA ᚂᚒᚌᚒᚇᚓᚉᚐ
(140) LUGAVVECCA ᚂᚒᚌᚐᚃᚃᚓᚉᚉᚐ

The divine name ERC (meaning either 'heaven or 'cow') appears in names such as:

(93) ERCAIDANA ᚓᚏᚉᚐᚔᚇᚐᚅᚐ
(196) ERCAVICCAS ᚓᚏᚉᚐᚃᚔᚉᚉᚐᚄ

Other names indicate sept or tribal name, such as:

(156) DOVVINIAS ᚇᚑᚃᚃᚔᚅᚔᚐᚄ from the Corcu Duibne sept of the Dingle and Iveragh peninsulas in County Kerry (named after a local goddess)
(215) ALLATO ᚐᚂᚂᚐᚈᚑ from the Altraige of North Kerry
(106) CORIBIRI ᚉᚑᚏᚔᚁᚔᚏᚔ from the Dál Coirpri of County Cork

Of particular interest is the fact that quite a few names denote a relationship to trees, such as:

(230) MAQI-CARATTINN ᚋᚐᚊᚔ ᚉᚐᚏᚐᚈᚈᚔᚅᚅ – 'son of rowan'
(v) MAQVI QOLI ᚋᚐᚊᚃᚔ ᚊᚑᚂᚔ – 'son of hazel'
(259) IVOGENI ᚔᚃᚑᚌᚓᚅᚔ – 'born of yew'

The content of the inscriptions has led scholars such as McNeill and Macalister to argue that they are explicitly pagan in nature. They argue that the inscriptions were later defaced by Christian converts, who deliberately removed the word MUCOI ᚋᚒᚉᚑᚔ on account of its supposedly pagan associations and added crosses next to them.

Other scholars, such as McManus, argue that there is no evidence for this, citing inscriptions such as

(145) QRIMITIR RONANN MAQ COMOGANN ᚛ᚊᚏᚔᚋᚔᚈᚔᚏ ᚏᚑᚅᚐᚅᚅ ᚋᚐᚊ ᚉᚑᚋᚑᚌᚐᚅᚅ᚜

where QRIMITIR is a loan word from Latin presbyter or 'priest'. McManus argues that the supposed vandalism of the inscriptions is simply wear and tear, and due to the inscription stones being reused as building material for walls, lintels, etc. (McManus, §4.9). McManus also argues that the MUCOI formula word survived into Christian manuscript usage. There is also the fact the inscriptions were made at a time when Christianity had become firmly established in Ireland. Whether those who wrote the inscriptions were pagans, Christians, or a mixture of both remains unclear.

=== Ireland ===
Ireland has the vast majority of inscriptions, with 330 out of 382. One of the most important collections of orthodox ogham inscriptions in Ireland can be seen in University College Cork (UCC) on public display in 'The Stone Corridor'. The inscriptions were collected by antiquarian Abraham Abell 1783–1851 and were deposited in the Cork Institution before being put on display in UCC. He was a member of the Cuvierian Society of Cork whose members, including John Windele, Fr. Matt Horgan and R.R. Brash, did extensive work in this area in the mid-19th century.

Another well-known group of inscriptions, known as the Dunloe Ogham Stones, can be seen at Dunloe near Killarney in County Kerry. The inscriptions are arranged in a semicircle at the side of the road and are very well preserved.

ID	Text	Translation / Personal names	Location	Notes
CIIC 1	᚛ᚂᚔᚓ ᚂᚒᚌᚅᚐᚓᚇᚑᚅ ᚋᚐᚉᚉᚔ ᚋᚓᚅᚒᚓᚆ᚜ LIE LUGNAEDON MACCI MENUEH	"The stone of Lugnaedon son of Limenueh".	Inchagoill island, County Galway	CISP INCHA/1
CIIC 2	᚛ᚊᚓᚅᚒᚃᚓᚅᚇᚔ᚜ QENUVEN[DI]	Qenuvendi, "white head", corresponding to early names Cenond, Cenondÿn, Cenindÿn See Cloonmorris Ogham stone	Bornacoola, County Leitrim	CISP CLOOM/1
CIIC 3	᚛ᚉᚒᚅᚐᚂᚓᚌᚔ ᚐᚃᚔ ᚊᚒᚅᚐᚉᚐᚅᚑᚄ᚜ CUNALEGI AVI QUNACANOS	"Cunalegi, descendant of Qunacanos"	Island, Costello, County Mayo	CISP ISLAN/1
CIIC 4	᚛ᚂᚒᚌᚐᚇᚇᚑᚅ ᚋᚐᚊᚔ ᚂᚒᚌᚒᚇᚓᚉ᚜ ᚛ᚇᚇᚔᚄᚔ ᚋᚑ[--]ᚉᚊᚒᚄᚓᚂ᚜ LUGADDON MA[QI] L[U]GUDEC; DDISI MO[--]CQU SEL	Lugáed son of Luguid	Kilmannia, Costello	CISP KILMA/1
CIIC 5	᚛ᚐᚂᚐᚈᚈᚑᚄ ᚋᚐᚊᚔ ᚁᚏ᚜ ALATTOS MAQI BR[	Alattos son of Br...	Rusheens East, Kilmovee, Costello	CISP RUSHE/1
CIIC 6	᚛ᚊᚐᚄᚔᚌᚔᚅᚔᚋᚐᚊᚔ᚜ QASIGN[I]MAQ[I]	Qasignias son of ...	Tullaghaun, Costello	CISP TULLA/1
CIIC 7	᚛ᚋᚐᚊ ᚉᚓᚏᚐᚅᚔ ᚐᚃᚔ ᚐᚖᚓᚉᚓᚈᚐᚔᚋᚔᚅ᚜ MAQ CERAN[I] AVI ATHECETAIMIN	Son of Ciarán, descendant of the Uí Riaghan	Corrower, Gallen, County Mayo	CISP CORRO/1
CIIC 8	᚛ᚋᚐᚊᚔ ᚋᚒᚉᚑᚔ ᚉᚑᚏᚁᚐᚌᚅᚔ ᚌᚂᚐᚄᚔᚉᚑᚅᚐᚄ᚜ MA[QUI MUCOI] CORBAGNI GLASICONAS	Son of the tribe Corbagnus Glasiconas	Dooghmakeon, Murrisk, County Mayo	CISP DOOGH/1
CIIC 9	᚛ᚋᚐᚊᚐᚉᚈᚑᚋᚐᚊᚌᚐᚏ᚜ MAQACTOMAQGAR	Son of Acto, son of Gar	Aghaleague, Tirawley, County Mayo	CISP AGHAL/1 Almost illegible
CIIC 10	᚛ᚂᚓᚌᚌ[--]ᚄᚇ[--]ᚂᚓᚌᚓᚄᚉᚐᚇ᚜ / ᚛ᚋᚐᚊ ᚉᚑᚏᚏᚁᚏᚔ ᚋᚐᚊ ᚐᚋᚋᚂᚂᚑᚌᚔᚈᚈ᚜ L[E]GG[--]SD[--] LEGwESCAD / MAQ CORRBRI MAQ AMMLLOGwITT	Legwescad, son of Corrbrias, son of Ammllogwitt	Breastagh, Tirawley	CISP BREAS/1
CIIC 38	᚛ᚉᚑᚏᚁᚔᚕᚑᚔᚋᚐᚊᚔᚂᚐᚏᚔᚇ᚜ CORBI KOI MAQI LABRID	Here is Corb, son of Labraid	Ballyboodan, Knocktopher, County Kilkenny	
CIIC 47	᚛ᚅᚓᚈᚐᚉᚐᚏᚔᚅᚓᚈᚐᚉᚉᚐᚌᚔ᚜ NETACARI NETA CAGI	Netacari, nephew of Cagi	Castletimon, Brittas Bay, County Wicklow	
CIIC 50	᚛ᚃᚑᚈᚔ᚜ VOTI	of Votus (?); Vow (?)	Boleycarrigeen, Kilranelagh, County Wicklow	
CIIC 180	᚛ᚁᚏᚒᚄᚉᚉᚑᚄᚋᚐᚊᚊᚔᚉᚐᚂᚔᚐᚉᚔ᚜ BRUSCCOS MAQQI CALIACỊ	"of Bruscus son of Cailech"	Emlagh East, Dingle, County Kerry	
CIIC 193	᚛ᚐᚅᚋ ᚉᚑᚂᚋᚐᚅ ᚐᚔᚂᚔᚈᚆᚔᚏ᚜ ANM COLMAN AILITHIR	"[written in] the name of Colmán, the pilgrim"	Maumanorig, County Kerry	CISP MAUIG/1
CIIC 200	᚛ᚋᚐᚊᚔ ᚈᚈᚐᚂ ᚋᚐᚊᚔ ᚃᚑᚏᚌᚑᚄ ᚋᚐᚊᚔ ᚋᚒᚉᚑᚔᚉᚐᚉ᚜ MAQI-TTAL MAQI VORGOS MAQI MUCOI TOICAC	Son of Dal, son of Vergosus (Fergus), son of the tribe of Toica	Coolmagort, Dunkerron North, County Kerry	CISP COOLM/4
CIIC 300	᚛ᚉᚒᚅᚅᚓᚈᚐᚄ ᚋᚐᚊᚔ ᚌᚒᚉᚑᚔ ᚅᚓᚈᚐ ᚄᚓᚌᚐᚋᚑᚅᚐᚄ᚜ CUNNETAS MAQI GUC[OI] NETA-SEGAMONAS	Cunnetas, Neta-Segamonas	Old Island, Decies-without-Drum, County Waterford	CISP OLDIS/1
CIIC 317	᚛ᚇᚑᚈᚓᚈᚈᚑ ᚋᚐᚊᚔ ᚋᚐᚌᚂᚐᚅᚔ᚜ DOTETTO MAQ[I MAGLANI]	Dotetto, Maglani(?)	Aghascrebagh, Upper Strabane, County Tyrone	CISP AGHAS/1
CIIC 1082	᚛ᚌᚂᚐᚅᚅᚐᚅᚔ ᚋᚐᚊᚔ ᚁᚁᚏᚐᚅᚅᚐᚇ᚜ GLANNANI MAQI BBRANNAD		Ballybroman, County Kerry	CISP BALBR/1
CIIC 1083	᚛ᚉᚑᚋᚋᚐᚌᚌᚐᚌᚅᚔ ᚋᚒᚉᚑᚔ ᚄᚐᚋᚋᚅᚅ᚜ COMMAGGAGNI MU[CO]I SAMMNN		Rathkenny, Ardfert, Corkaguiney, County Kerry	CISP RTHKE/1
—	᚛ᚐᚅᚋ ᚄᚔᚂᚂᚐᚅᚅ ᚋᚐᚊ ᚃᚐᚈᚈᚔᚂᚂᚑᚌᚌ᚜ [A]NM SILLANN MAQ FATTILLOGG		Ratass Church, Tralee, County Kerry	CISP RATAS/1

=== Wales ===
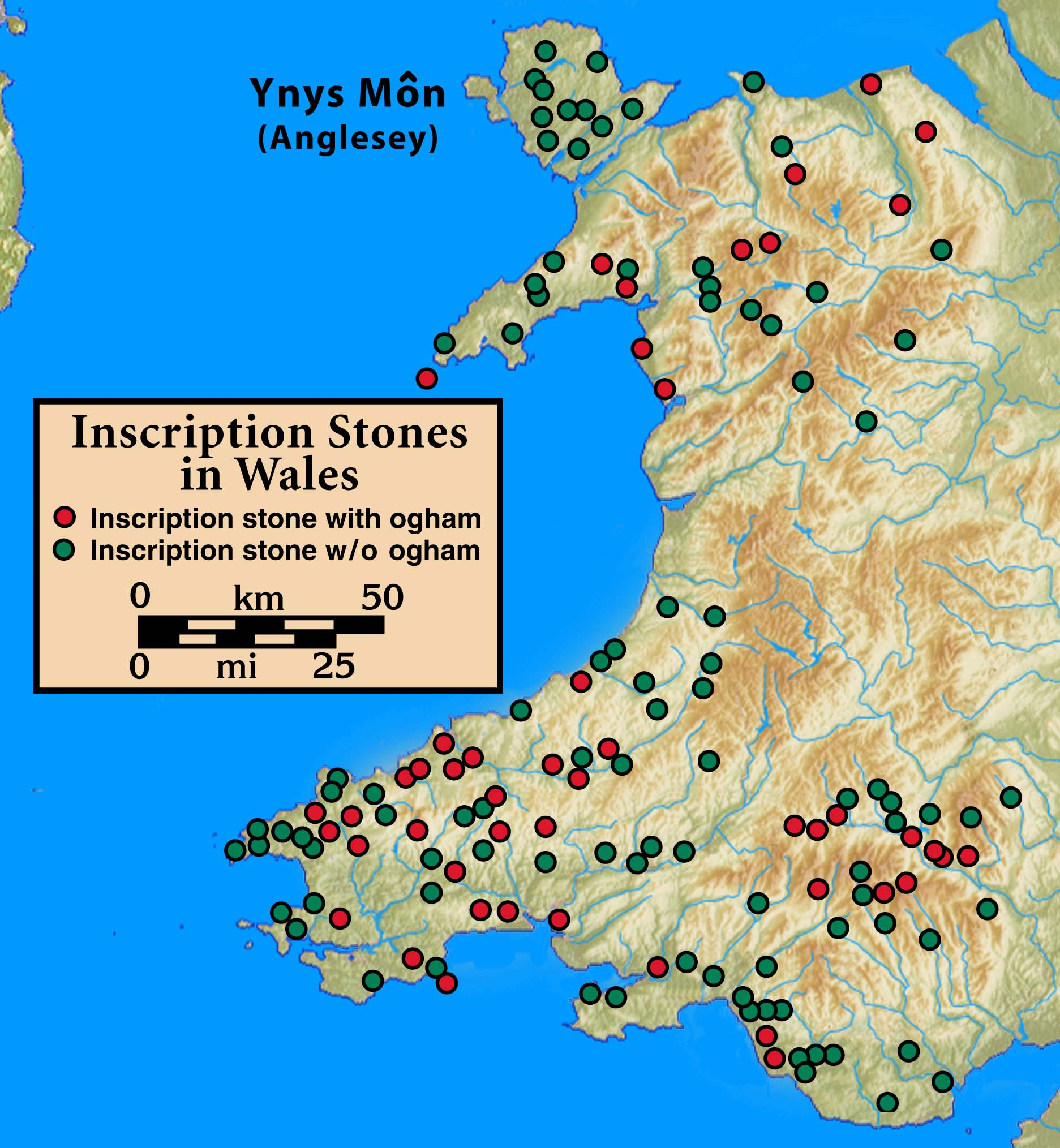

The orthodox inscriptions in Wales are noted for containing names of both Latin and Brythonic (or early Welsh) origin, and are mostly accompanied by a Latin inscription in the Roman alphabet (Ecclesiastical and Late Latin remained the language of writing in Wales throughout the post-Roman period). Examples of Brythonic names include (446) MAGLOCUNI ᚋᚐᚌᚂᚑᚉᚒᚅᚔ (Welsh Maelgwn) and (449) CUNOTAMI ᚉᚒᚅᚑᚈᚐᚋᚔ (Welsh cyndaf).

Wales has the distinction of the only ogham stone inscription that bears the name of an identifiable individual. The stone commemorates Vortiporius, a 6th-century king of Dyfed (originally located in Clynderwen). Wales also has the only ogham inscription known to commemorate a woman. At Eglwys Cymmin (Cymmin church) in Carmarthenshire is the inscription (362) INIGENA CUNIGNI AVITTORIGES ᚛ᚐᚃᚔᚈᚑᚏᚔᚌᚓᚄ ᚔᚅᚔᚌᚓᚅᚐ ᚉᚒᚅᚔᚌᚅᚔ᚜ or 'Avitoriges, daughter of Cunigni'. Avitoriges is an Irish name while Cunigni is Brythonic (Welsh Cynin), reflecting the mixed heritage of the inscription makers. Wales also has several inscriptions which attempt to replicate the supplementary letter or forfeda for P (inscriptions 327 and 409).

ID	Text	Translation / Personal names	Location	Notes
CIIC 423	᚛ᚊ[--]ᚊᚐ[--]ᚌᚈᚓ᚜ Q[--]QA[--]GTE	Son of Quegte?	Castle Villa, Brawdy, Pembrokeshire	CISP BRAW/1
CIIC 426	᚛ᚅᚓᚈᚈᚐᚄᚐᚌᚏᚔ ᚋᚐᚊᚔ ᚋᚒᚉᚑᚓ ᚁᚏᚔᚐᚉᚔ᚜ NETTASAGRI MAQI MUCOE BRIACI	Nettasagri, Briaci	Bridell, Pembrokeshire	CISP BRIDL/1
CIIC 427	᚛ᚋᚐᚌᚂᚔᚇᚒᚁᚐᚏ[--]ᚊᚔ᚜ MAGL[I]DUBAR [--]QI	Magl[ia], Dubr[acunas]	Caldey Island, Penally, Pembrokeshire	CISP CALDY/1
CIIC 456	᚛ᚌᚓᚅᚇᚔᚂᚔ᚜ GENDILI	Gendilius	Steynton, Pembrokeshire	CISP STNTN/1 Latin "GENDILI"

=== England, Isle of Man, Scotland ===
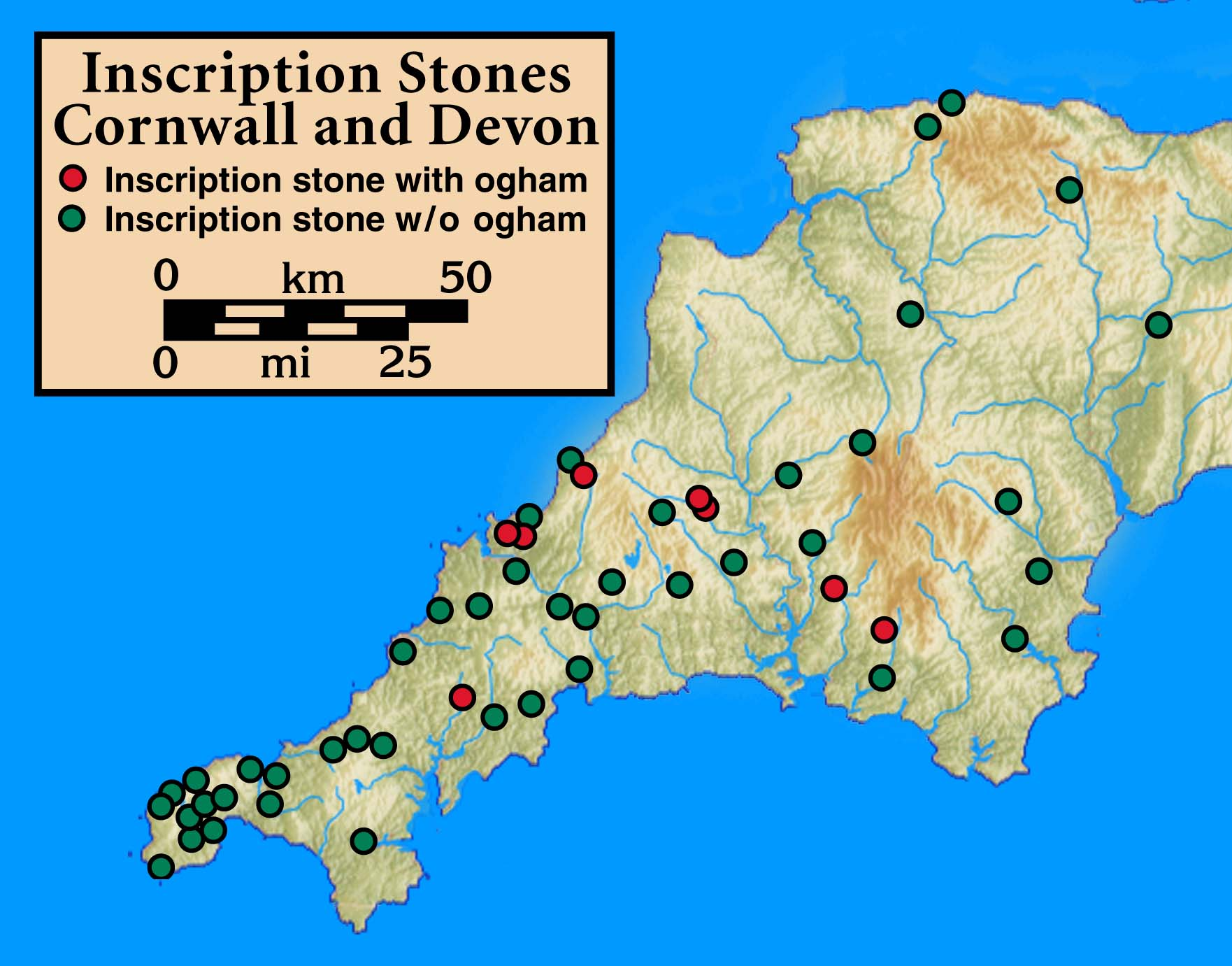

England has seven or eight ogham inscriptions, five in Cornwall and two in Devon, which are the product of early Irish settlement in the area (then the Brythonic kingdom of Dumnonia). A further inscription in Silchester in Hampshire is presumed to be the work of a lone Irish settler.

Scotland has only three orthodox inscriptions, as the rest are scholastic inscriptions made by the Picts (see below).

The Isle of Man has five inscriptions. One of these is the famous inscription at Port St. Mary (503) which reads DOVAIDONA MAQI DROATA ᚛ᚇᚑᚃᚐᚔᚇᚑᚅᚐ ᚋᚐᚊᚔ ᚇᚏᚑᚐᚈᚐ᚜ or 'Dovaidona son of the Druid'.

ID	Text	Translation / Personal names	Location	Notes
CIIC 466	᚛ᚔᚌᚓᚅᚐᚃᚔ ᚋᚓᚋᚑᚏ᚜ IGENAVI MEMOR		Lewannick, Cornwall	CISP LWNCK/1 Latin text "INGENVI MEMORIA"
CIIC 467	᚛ᚒᚂᚉᚐᚌᚅᚔ᚜ U[L]CAG[.I] / [.L]CAG[.]I	Ulcagni	Lewannick, Cornwall	CISP LWNCK/2 Latin text "[HI]C IACIT VLCAGNI"
CIIC 470	᚛ᚂᚐᚈᚔᚅᚔ᚜ LA[TI]NI		Worthyvale, Slaughterbridge, Minster, Cornwall	CISP WVALE/1 Latin text "LATINI IC IACIT FILIUS MACARI"
CIIC 484	᚛ᚔᚒᚄᚈᚔ᚜ [I]USTI		St. Kew, Cornwall	CISP STKEW/1 A block of granite, Latin "IVSTI" in a cartouche
CIIC 489	᚛ᚄᚃᚐᚊᚊᚒᚉᚔ ᚋᚐᚊᚔ ᚊᚔᚉᚔ᚜ SVAQQUCI MAQI QICI	"[The stone] of Safaqqucus, son of Qicus"	Fardel Manor, near Ivybridge, Devon	CISP FARDL/1
CIIC 488	᚛ᚓᚅᚐᚁᚐᚏᚏ᚜ ENABARR	To compare with the name of the horse of Manannan Mac Lir (Enbarr)	Roborough Down, Buckland Monachorum, Devon	CISP TVST3/1
CIIC 496	᚛ᚓᚁᚔᚉᚐᚈᚑᚄ ᚋᚐᚊᚔ ᚋᚒᚉᚑᚔ᚜ EBICATO[S] [MAQ]I MUCO[I] [		Silchester, Hampshire	CISP SILCH/1 Excavated 1893
CIIC 500	FILIVS-ROCATI | HIC-IACIT ᚛ᚒᚁᚔᚉᚐᚈᚑᚄᚋᚐᚊᚔᚏᚑᚉᚐᚈᚑᚄ᚜ [.]b[i]catos-m[a]qi-r[o]c[a]t[o]s	"Ammecatus son of Rocatus lies here" "[Am]bicatos son of Rocatos"	Knoc y Doonee, Kirk Andreas	CISP ANDRS/1 Combined Latin and Ogam
CIIC 501	᚛ᚉᚒᚅᚐᚋᚐᚌᚂᚔ ᚋᚐᚉ᚜ CUNAMAGLI MAC[			CISP ARBRY/1
CIIC 502	᚛ᚋᚐᚊ ᚂᚓᚑᚌ᚜ MAQ LEOG			CISP ARBRY/2
CIIC 503	᚛ᚇᚑᚃᚐᚔᚇᚑᚅᚐ ᚋᚐᚊᚔ ᚇᚏᚑᚐᚈᚐ᚜ DOVAIDONA MAQI DROATA	"Dovaido son of the Druid."	Ballaqueeney, Port St Mary, Rushen	CISP RUSHN/1
CIIC 504	᚛ᚁᚔᚃᚐᚔᚇᚑᚅᚐᚄᚋᚐᚊᚔᚋᚒᚉᚑᚔ᚜ ᚛ᚉᚒᚅᚐᚃᚐᚂᚔ᚜ BIVAIDONAS MAQI MUCOI CUNAVA[LI]	"Of Bivaidonas, son of the tribe Cunava[li]"	Ballaqueeney, Port St Mary, Rushen	CISP RUSHN/2
CIIC 506	᚛ᚃᚔᚉᚒᚂᚐ ᚋᚐᚊ ᚉᚒᚌᚔᚅᚔ᚜ VICULA MAQ CUGINI	Vicula, Cugini	Gigha, Argyll	CISP GIGHA/1
CIIC 507	᚛ᚉᚏᚑᚅ[-]ᚅ᚜ CRON[-][N][		Poltaloch, Kilmartin, Argyll	CISP POLCH/1 Fragment, recognised in 1931
CIIC 1068	᚛ᚂᚒᚌᚅᚔ᚜ LUGNI		Ballavarkish, Bride	CISP BRIDE/1 Recognized 1911; crosses and animals, 8th or 9th century

== Scholastic inscriptions ==
The term 'scholastic' derives from the fact that the inscriptions are believed to have been inspired by the manuscript sources, instead of being continuations of the original monument tradition. Scholastic inscriptions typically draw a line into the stone's surface along which the letters are arranged, rather than using the stone's edge. They begin in the course of the 6th century, and continue into Old and Middle Irish, and even into Modern times. From the High Middle Ages, contemporary to the Manuscript tradition, they may contain Forfeda. The 30 or so Pictish inscriptions qualify as early Scholastic, roughly 6th to 9th century. Some Viking Age stones on Man and Shetland are in Old Norse, or at least contain Norse names.

=== Scotland ===
ID	Text	Translation / Personal names	Location	Notes
CISP BRATT/1	᚛ᚔᚏᚐᚈᚐᚇᚇᚑᚐᚏᚓᚅᚄ᚜ IRATADDOARENS[	Addoaren (Saint Ethernan?)	Brandsbutt, Inverurie, Aberdeenshire	CISP BRATT/1 Pictish(?), dated 6th to 8th century
CISP BREAY/1	᚛ᚉᚏᚏᚑᚄᚄᚉᚉ᚜ : ᚛ᚅᚐᚆᚆᚈᚃᚃᚇᚇᚐᚇᚇᚄ᚜ : ᚛ᚇᚐᚈᚈᚏᚏ᚜ : ᚛ᚐᚅᚅ[--] ᚁᚓᚅᚔᚄᚓᚄ ᚋᚓᚊᚊ ᚇᚇᚏᚑᚐᚅᚅ[--]᚜ CRRO[S]SCC : NAHHTVVDDA[DD]S : DATTRR : [A]NN[--] BEN[I]SES MEQQ DDR[O]ANN[--	Nahhtvdd[add]s, Benises, Dr[o]ann	Bressay, Shetland	CISP BREAY/1 Norse or Gaelic, contains five forfeda
?	᚛ᚁᚓᚅᚇᚇᚐᚉᚈᚐᚅᚔᚋᚂ᚜ [B]ENDDACTANIM[L]	a blessing on the soul of L.	Birsay, Orkney	Excavated in 1970. See Buckquoy spindle-whorl
CISP AUQUH/1	᚛ᚐᚃᚒᚑᚐᚅᚅᚒᚅᚐᚑᚒᚐᚈᚓᚇᚑᚃᚓᚅᚔ᚜ AVUOANNUNAOUATEDOVENI	Avuo Anuano soothsayer of the Doveni	Auquhollie, near Stonehaven	CISP AUQUH/1 See Lang_Stane_of_Auquhollie
Newton Stone	ᚐᚔᚇᚇᚐᚏᚉᚒᚅ ᚃᚓᚐᚅ ᚃᚑᚁᚏᚓᚅᚅᚔ ᚁᚐᚂᚄ[ᚁᚐᚉᚄ] ᚔᚑᚄᚄᚐᚏ; AIDDARCUN FEAN FOBRENNI BA(L or K)S IOSSAR	?	Shevock toll-bar, Aberdeenshire	Contains 2(?) lines of Ogham inscriptions and an undeciphered secondary inscription

=== Isle of Man ===
- CISP KMICH/1, an 11th-century combined Runic and Ogam inscription in Kirk Michael churchyard, Kirk Michael, Isle of Man
  ᚛ᚁᚂᚃᚄᚅᚆᚇᚈᚉᚊᚋᚌᚍᚎᚏᚐᚑᚒᚓᚔ᚜
  ᚛ᚋᚒᚒᚉᚑᚋᚐᚂᚂᚐᚃᚔᚒᚐᚋᚒᚂᚂᚌᚒᚉ᚜
  ᛘᛅᛚ᛬ᛚᚢᛘᚴᚢᚿ᛬ᚱᛅᛁᛋᛏᛁ᛬ᚴᚱᚢᛋ᛬ᚦᛁᚾᛅ᛬ᛁᚠᛏᛁᚱ᛬ᛘᛅᛚ᛬ᛘᚢᚱᚢ᛬ᚠᚢᛋᛏᚱᛅ᛬ᛋᛁᚾᛁ᛬ᛏᚭᛏᛁᚱᛏᚢᚠᚴᛅᛚᛋ᛬ᚴᚭᚾᛅ᛬ᛁᛋ᛬ᛅᚦᛁᛋᛚ᛬ᛅᛏᛁ᛭
  ᛒᛁᛏᚱᛅᛁᛋ᛬ᛚᛅᛁᚠᛅ᛬ᚠᚢᛋᛏᚱᛅ᛬ᚴᚢᚦᛅᚾ᛬ᚦᛅᚾ᛬ᛋᚭᚾ᛬ᛁᛚᛅᚾ᛭
  Transcription:
  blfsnhdtcqmgngzraouei
  MUUCOMAL LAFIUA MULLGUC
  MAL : LUMKUN : RAISTI : KRUS : ÞINA : IFTIR : MAL : MURU : FUSTRA : SINI : TOTIRTUFKALS : KONA : IS : AÞISL : ATI+
  [B]ITRA : IS : LAIFA : FUSTRA : KUÞAN : ÞAN : SON : ILAN +
  Translation:
  An ogham abecedarium (the whole ogham alphabet)
  "Mucomael grandson/descendant of O'Maelguc"
  "Mal Lumkun set up this cross in memory of Mal Mury her foster-son, daughter of Dufgal, the wife whom Athisl married,"
  "Better it is to leave a good foster son than a bad son"
  (The runic part is in Norse.)
- ᚁᚐᚉ ᚑᚉᚑᚔᚉᚐᚈᚔᚐᚂᚂ or possibly ᚐ ᚋᚐᚊᚔᚋᚒᚉᚑᚔᚉᚐᚈᚔᚐᚂᚂ
  ...BAC......OCOICATIALL possibly 'A thong (group) of fifty warriors'
  An ogham inscription in Old Irish discovered at the Speke Farm keeill (chapel) by the seventh fairway of the Mount Murray golf course five miles southwest of Douglas by a Time Team excavation.
  Has been defined as an 11th - 12th century inscription on stylistic grounds (use of bind ogham)
  However there has been at least one proposed date of 6th - 8th century from the association of a 6-7th century grave nearby, with the possibility of the more familiar variant reading '..A...MACI MUCOI CATIALL[I]' '..., son of the tribe of Catiall[i].'

=== Ireland ===
- A 19th-century ogham inscription from Ahenny, Co. Tipperary (Raftery 1969)
  Beneath this sepulchral tomb lie the remains of Mary Dempsey who departed this life January the 4th 1802 aged 17 years
  ᚛ᚃᚐᚐᚅᚂᚔᚌᚄᚑᚅᚐᚂᚒᚐᚈᚐᚋᚐᚏᚔᚅᚔᚇᚆᚔᚋᚒᚄᚐ᚜ ᚛ᚑᚋᚁᚐᚂᚂᚔᚅᚐᚌᚉᚏᚐᚅᚔᚁᚆ᚜
  fa an lig so na lu ata mari ni dhimusa / o mballi na gcranibh
  (Modern Irish Spelling): "Fán liag so ina luí atá Máire Ní Dhíomsaigh ó mBaile na gCrannaibh"
  (English): "Beneath this stone lieth Mári Ní Dhíomasaigh from Ballycranna"

== Manuscript tradition ==
- Latin text written in ogham, in the Annals of Inisfallen of 1193 (ms. Rawlinson B. 503, 40c)
  ᚛ᚅᚒᚋᚒᚄ ᚆᚑᚅᚑᚏᚐᚈᚒᚏ ᚄᚔᚅᚓ᚜ ᚛ᚅᚒᚋᚑ ᚅᚒᚂᚂᚒᚄ ᚐᚋᚐᚈᚒᚏ᚜
  nummus honoratur sine / nummo nullus amatur
  This is a hexameter line with internal rhyme at the caesura, to be scanned as follows: nūmmŭs hŏnōrātūr || sĭnĕ nūmmō nūllŭs ămātūr.
  "Money is honoured, without money nobody is loved"
- Fictional inscription: a Middle Irish saga text recorded in the Book of Leinster (LL 66 AB) mentions the following ogham inscription:
  ᚛ᚌᚔᚚ ᚓ ᚈᚔᚄᚓᚇ ᚔᚅ ᚃᚐᚔᚇᚉᚆᚓ᚜ ᚛ᚇᚘᚐ ᚋᚁᚐ ᚌᚐᚄᚉᚓᚇᚐᚉᚆ᚜
  ᚛ᚌᚓᚔᚄ ᚃᚐᚔᚏ ᚐᚏ ᚈᚆᚓᚉᚆᚈ ᚇᚔᚅᚇ ᚃᚐᚔᚇᚉᚆᚔ᚜
  ᚛ᚉᚓᚅ ᚉᚆᚑᚋᚏᚐᚉ ᚅᚑᚓᚅᚃᚆᚔᚏ ᚇᚑ ᚃᚆᚒᚐᚉᚏᚐ᚜
  Gip e tised in faidche, dia m-ba gascedach, geis fair ar thecht dind faidchi cen chomrac n-oenfhir do fhuacra.
  "Whoever comes to this meadow, if he be armed, he is forbidden to leave the meadow, without requesting single combat."

== Literature ==
- Brash, R. R., The Ogam Inscribed Monuments of the Gaedhil in the British Isles, London (1879).
- J. Higgitt, K. Forsyth, D. Parsons (eds.), Roman, Runes and Ogham. Medieval Inscriptions in the Insular World and on the Continent, Donington: Shaun Tyas (2001).
- Jackson, K.H., Notes on the Ogam inscriptions of southern Britain, in C. Fox, B. Dickins (eds.) The Early Cultures of North-West Europe. Cambridge: 197—213 (1950).
- Macalister, Robert A.S. The Secret Languages of Ireland, pp27 – 36, Cambridge University Press, 1937
- Macalister, R. A. S., Corpus Inscriptionum Insularum Celticarum Vol. I., Dublin: Stationery Office (1945).
- Macalister, R. A. S., Corpus Inscriptionum Insularum Celticarum' Vol. II., Dublin: Stationery Office (1949).
- McManus, D, A Guide to Ogam, An Sagart, Maynooth, Co. Kildare (1991)
- MacNeill, Eoin. Archaisms in the Ogham Inscriptions, 'Proceedings of the Royal Irish Academy' 39, pp 33–53, Dublin
- Ziegler, S., Die Sprache der altirischen Ogam-Inschriften, Göttingen: Vandenhoeck and Ruprecht (1994).
