= CISP =

CISP may refer to:

- Visa's Cardholder Information Security Program, precursor of the Payment Card Industry Data Security Standard
- Celtic Inscribed Stones Project, a numbering scheme for the Ogham inscription
