= Ballaqueeney Ogham Stone =

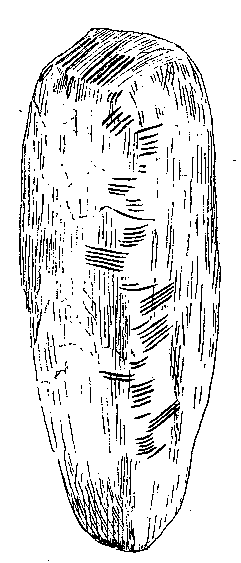
- CIIC ID: CIIC 504
- CISP ID: RUSHN/2
- Country: Isle of Man
- Region: Port St Mary / Rushen
- City/Village: Originally Ballaqueeney, currently Manx Museum, Douglas
- Produced: 5th Century
- Dimensions: 52cm High, 13cm Wide, 10cm Thick

Ogham letters:
- ᚁᚔᚃᚐᚔᚇᚑᚅᚐᚄ ᚋᚐᚊᚔ ᚋᚒᚉᚑᚔ ᚉᚒᚅᚐᚃᚐᚂᚔ

Text - Native:
- BIVAIDONAS MAQI MUCOI CUNAVA[LI]

Text - English:
- Of Bivaidonas, son of the tribe Cunava[li]

Other resources:
- Ogham; Ogham inscription

The Ballaqueeney Ogham Stone is an early medieval memorial stone with an Ogham inscription. It was discovered at Ballaqueeney (Ballaquine) Isle of Man in 1874 by Reverend F. B. Grant during the process of excavating dirt for use as railroad ballast.

The stone was kept in a garden in Ballaqueeney from its discovery until about 1885. This caused the stone surface to deteriorate, due to being exposed to wind and rain, with the result that two Ogham letters can no longer be read.

Macalister noted that "the grooves are finely cut with a V-shaped section" and "the scores forming the consonants for the most part are 2 inches in length...there are no traces of divisional points; but there are longer spaces between the words than between the letters".

The stones are now located at the Manx Museum in Douglas where it has the catalogue number "MM 2".

Macalister reads the Ogham inscription as Bivaidonas maqi mucoi Cunavali meaning "[Stone] of Bivaidonas, son of the tribe of Cunavali". F. J. Byrne suggests that the personal name Bivaidonas is related to the Conailli Muirtheimne of north Louth and south Down. D. McManus notes that the tribal name Cunavali could refer to either an Irish or a British tribe.
