= Emlagh East Ogham Stone =

Emlagh Ogham Stone
- Cloch Oghaim Imleach Dhún Séann (Irish)
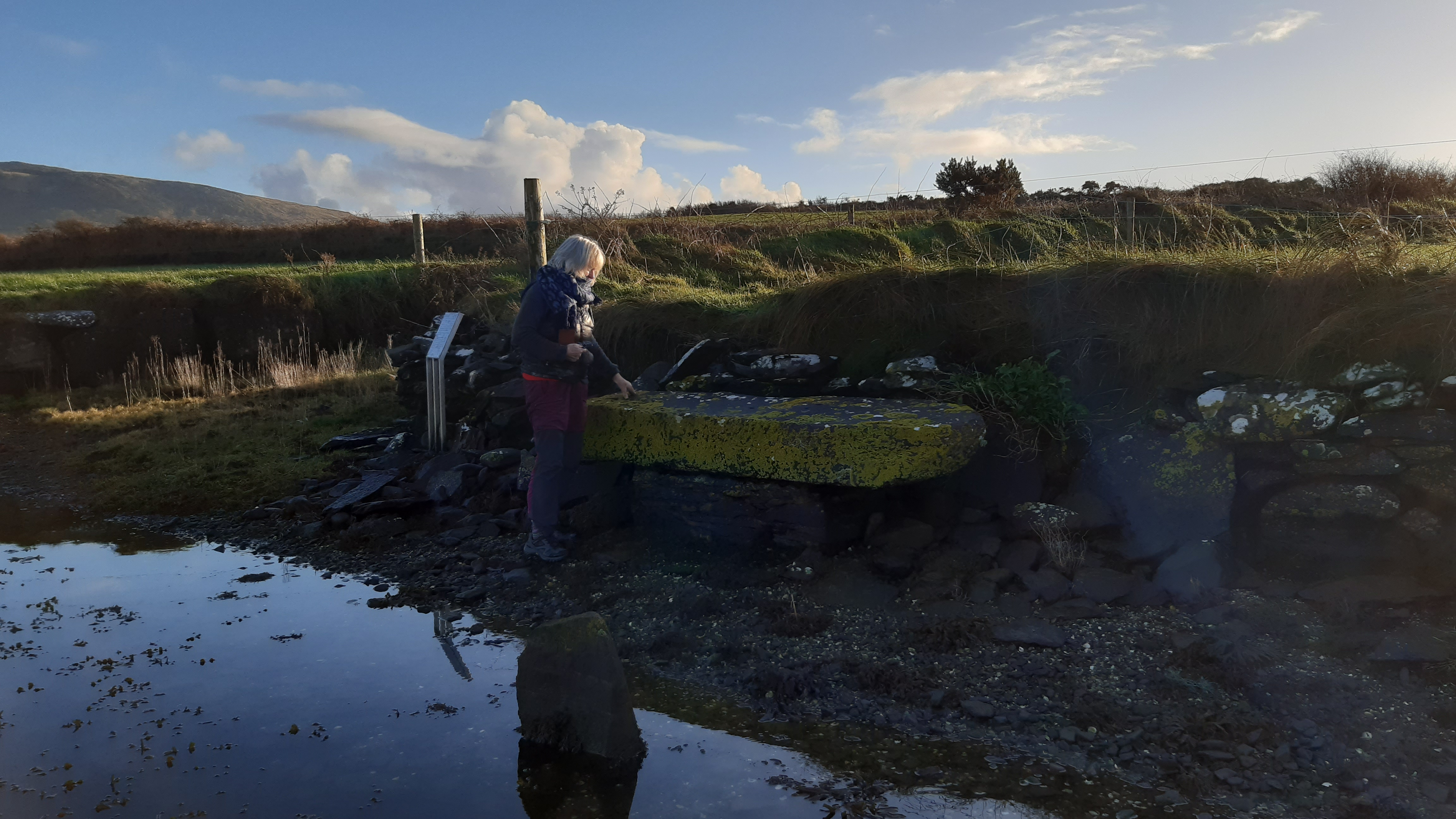
- The stone (covered in yellow-green lichen) in December 2025

- Location within Ireland
- 52.131528°N 10.216215°W
- Type: ogham stone
- Location: Emlagh East, Dingle, County Kerry, Ireland

History
- Built: c. 400–470 AD

Site notes
- Elevation: Sea level
- Height: 2.39 m (7 ft 10 in)
- Owner: Office of Public Works

National monument of Ireland
- Official name: Emlagh East Ogham Stone
- Reference no.: 221.46

The Emlagh East Ogham Stone, also called the Priest's Stone (Cloch an tSagairt) is an ogham stone (CIIC 180) and a National Monument located in County Kerry, Ireland. It was the first ogham stone recorded in the country.

== Location ==
Emlagh East ogham stone is located on the south end of Short Strand, near to Doonshean.

== History ==
This stone was erected as a grave marker, with inscription in Primitive Irish, some time in c. AD 400–470, making it contemporary with Saint Patrick. Nearby is a flat stone named Lackshivaunnageelagh (Leac Shiobhán na nGeimhleach, "flagstone of Siobhán of the captives"), and there is a tradition of an old church at the strand and evidence for a graveyard found nearby. It originally stood in a field near the strand at Trabeg and was noted by Edward Lluyd in 1702; it was moved temporarily to Chute Hall about 1849 and now lies on a concrete base near its original location. A translation of the text was published by the Royal Irish Academy in 1879.

== Description ==
The stone is grit, 239 × 61 × 28 cm. The inscription reads ᚛ᚁᚏᚒᚄᚉᚉᚑᚄᚋᚐᚊᚊᚔᚉᚐᚂᚔᚐᚉᚔ᚜ BRUSCCOS MAQQI CALIACỊ ("of Bruscus son of Cailech").

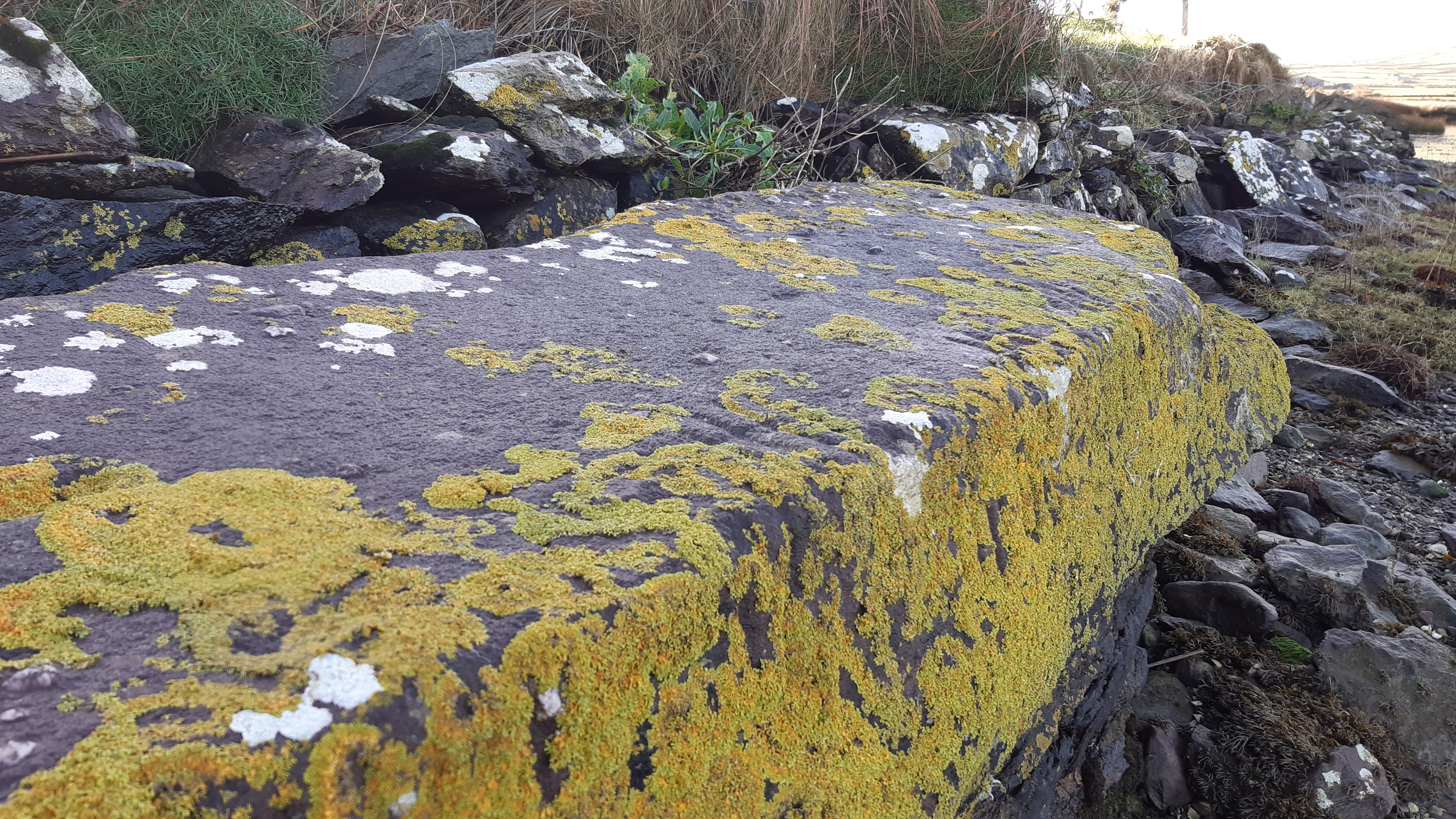
Ogham script on the edges of the stone partially obscured by lichen

A cross is carved into the stone; it is not clear if it was put there before or after the inscription. The name Bruscus (perhaps meaning "thunder") also appears on CIIC 64 in Glenawillin, located 140 kilometres (87 mi) to the east. In addition, Bruscus was the name of an ecclesiastic who was contemporary with Saint Patrick. The name Cailech appears in genealogical accounts of the Corcu Duibne. The inscription is one of the earliest Ogham inscriptions to have no evidence of vowel affection.
