= Bornacoola =

Parish in Leitrim/Longford, Ireland

Bornacoola (Irish: Barr na Cúile, meaning 'the top of the corner') is an ecclesiastical parish in the Roman Catholic Diocese of Ardagh and Clonmacnoise, Ireland. It is located at the southern extremity of County Leitrim in the civil parish of Mohill. Some of its townlands lie in neighbouring County Longford. The nearest large towns are Longford (8 miles) and Carrick-on-Shannon (11 miles).

== Townlands ==
The parish is bounded by the townlands indicated below, most of which coincide with the southern parts of the civil parish of Mohill (which straddles two baronies) with a few townlands in a neighbouring civil parish to the west.

- In the Barony of Mohill,

- Civil parish of Mohill

Acres, Aghamore, Aghnahunshin, Aghnamona, Ballygeeher (not Bellageeher), Cashel, Cloonboniagh North, Cloonboniagh South, Clooncarreen, Cloonclivvy, Clooncolry, Clooneagh, Cloonfannon, Cloonmorris, Cloontumpher, Cloonturk, Cornagillagh, Corracramph South, Corrascoffy, Derreen, Drumard (Jones), Drumard (Magerraun), Esker South, Esker North, Gortanure South, Gorteenoran or Georgia, Gortnalamph, Gubagraffy, Keelagh, Killinaker, Knockadrinan, Liscloonadea, Meelragh (Nagur), Meelragh (Saggart), Moher, Rinnagowna, Rooskynamona, Tulcon.

- Civil parish of Annaduff

Aughry, Drumod, Drumod Beg, Drumod More.

- In the Barony of Longford, county of Longford

- Civil parish of Mohill

Ahanagh, Bunanass, Clooncolligan, Cloonart North, Cloonart South, Clooneen (Beirne), Clooneen (Cox), Clooneen (Kennedy), Clooneen (Shanly), Edercloon, Tomisky.

== Churches ==
Local churches include St. Michael's Church, Bornacoola and St. Joseph's Church, Cloonturk.

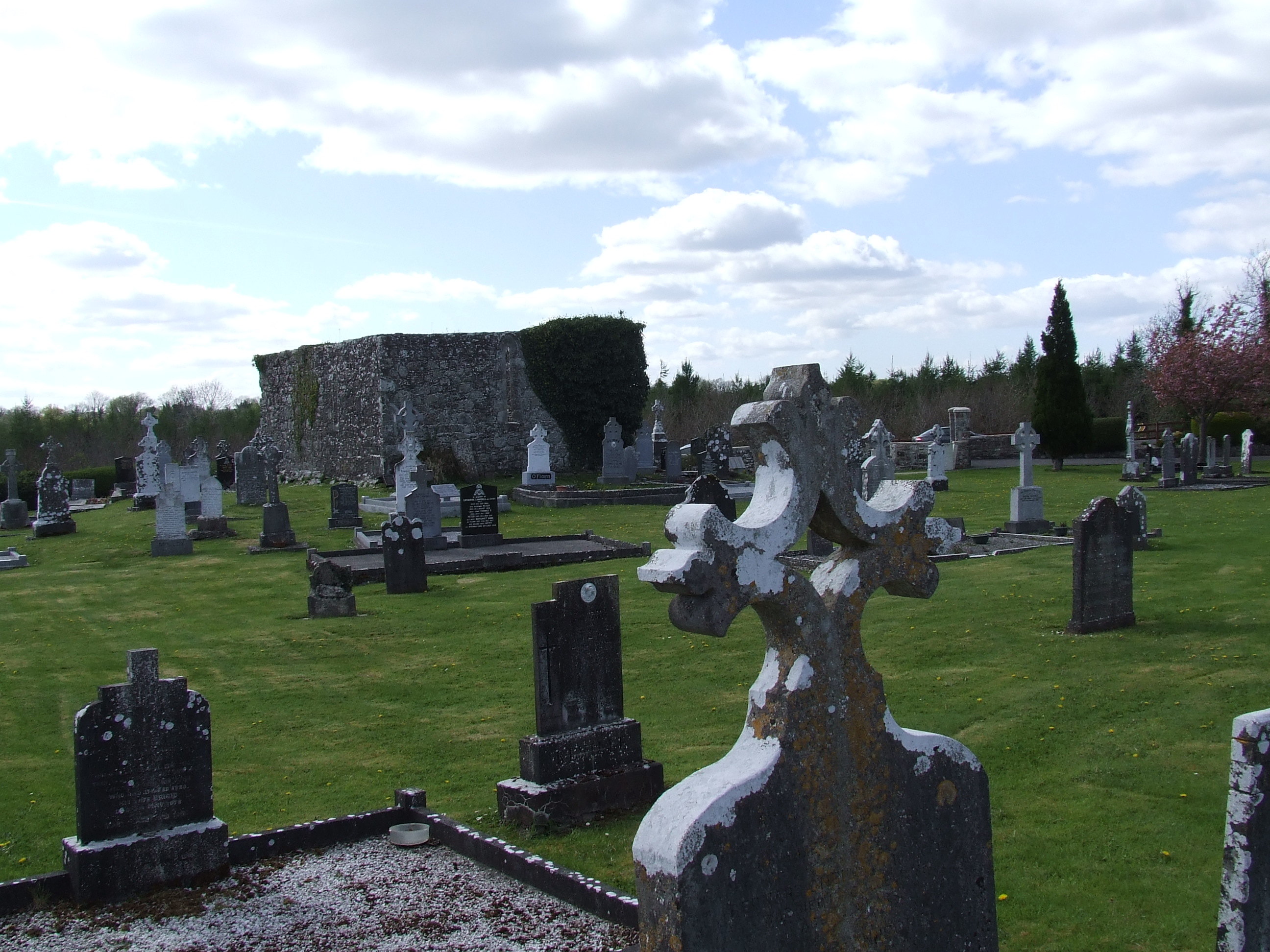
Parish graveyard

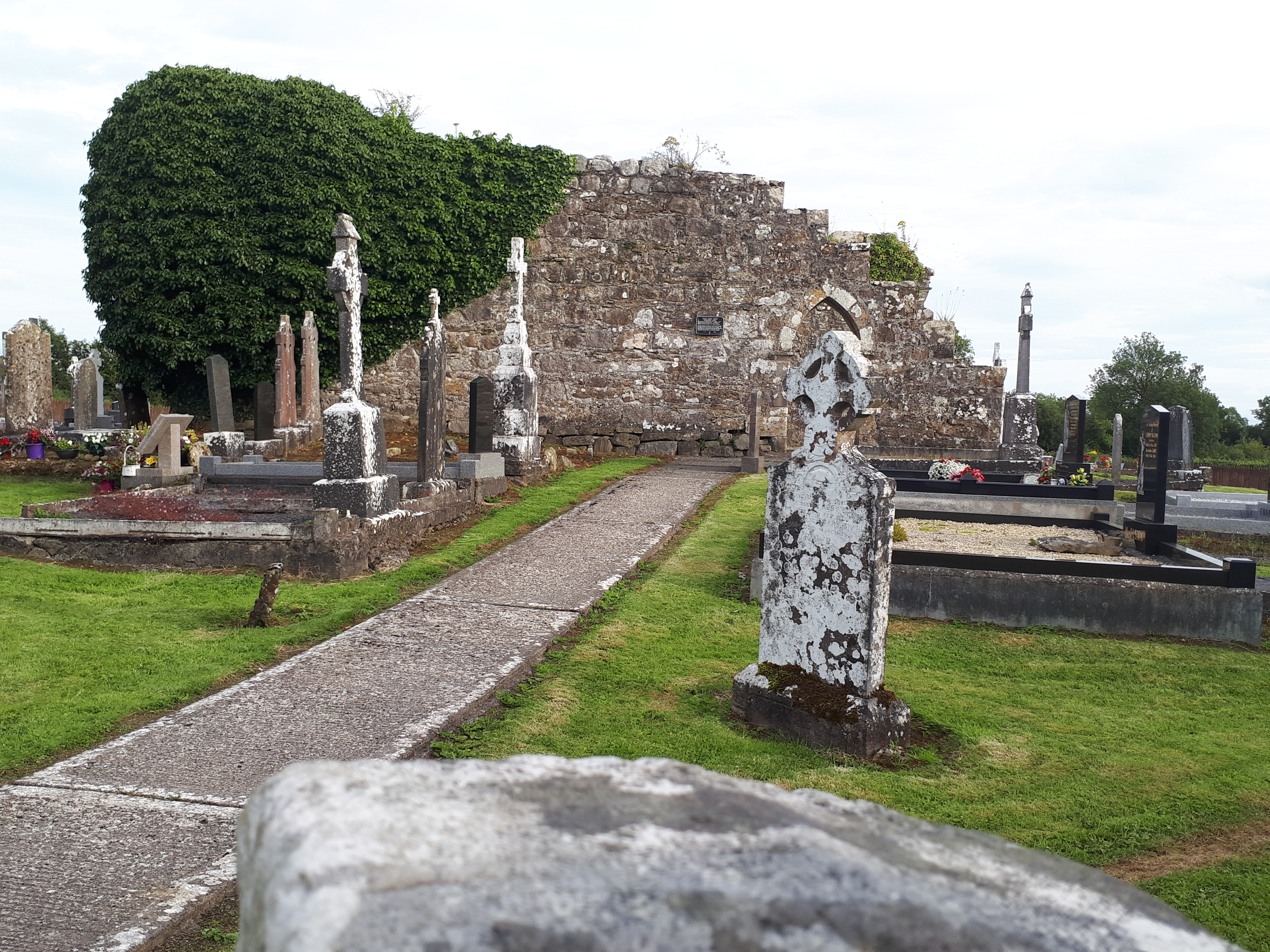
Early Christian church ruins (8c.-12c.)

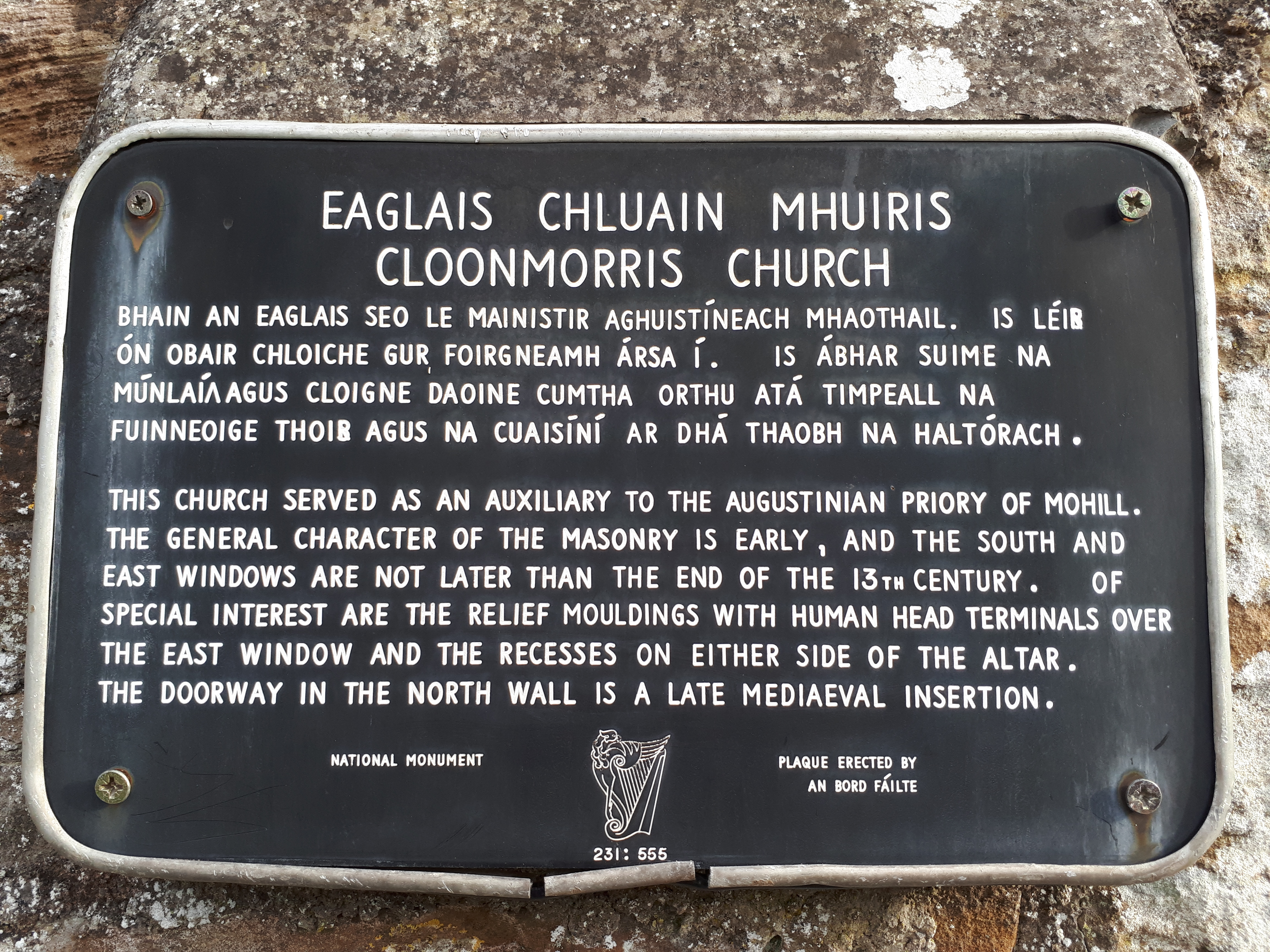
Church ruins plaque

== Features ==
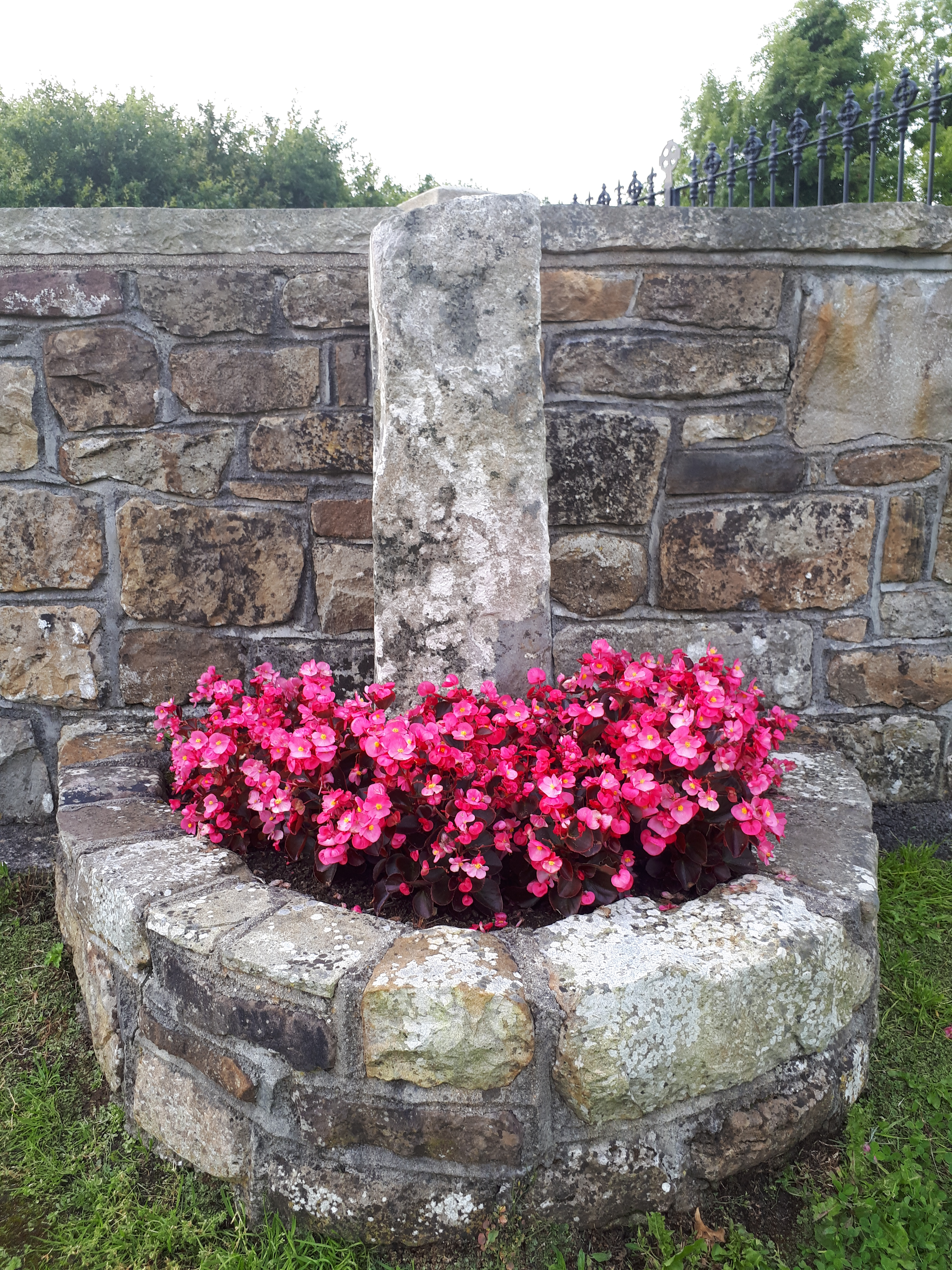
Ogham Stone (5c.-6c.)

Scoil Mhuire is the local national school (primary school).

Lady Baltimore's Statue is a statue located beside Johnston's Bridge in Bornacoola. It came from Baltimore, Maryland, USA and is named after a place in Bornacoola parish (Baile an Tigh Mor- the town of the big house). The family left Ireland and settled in Maryland and because of this link the statue to Lady Baltimore was sent back to Ireland in the 1970s and erected some years later.

Cloonmorris Ogham stone, also located nearby, is an ancient stone located in the graveyard. It is the only example of an Ogham inscribed stone in County Leitrim. It was incorrectly inverted when placed on a plinth. Also located within the grounds of the graveyard is an early Christian church. This is under the protection of the Office of Public Works.
