= Dungummin Ogham Stone =

Coordinates: 53°48′32.032″N 7°10′47.358″W

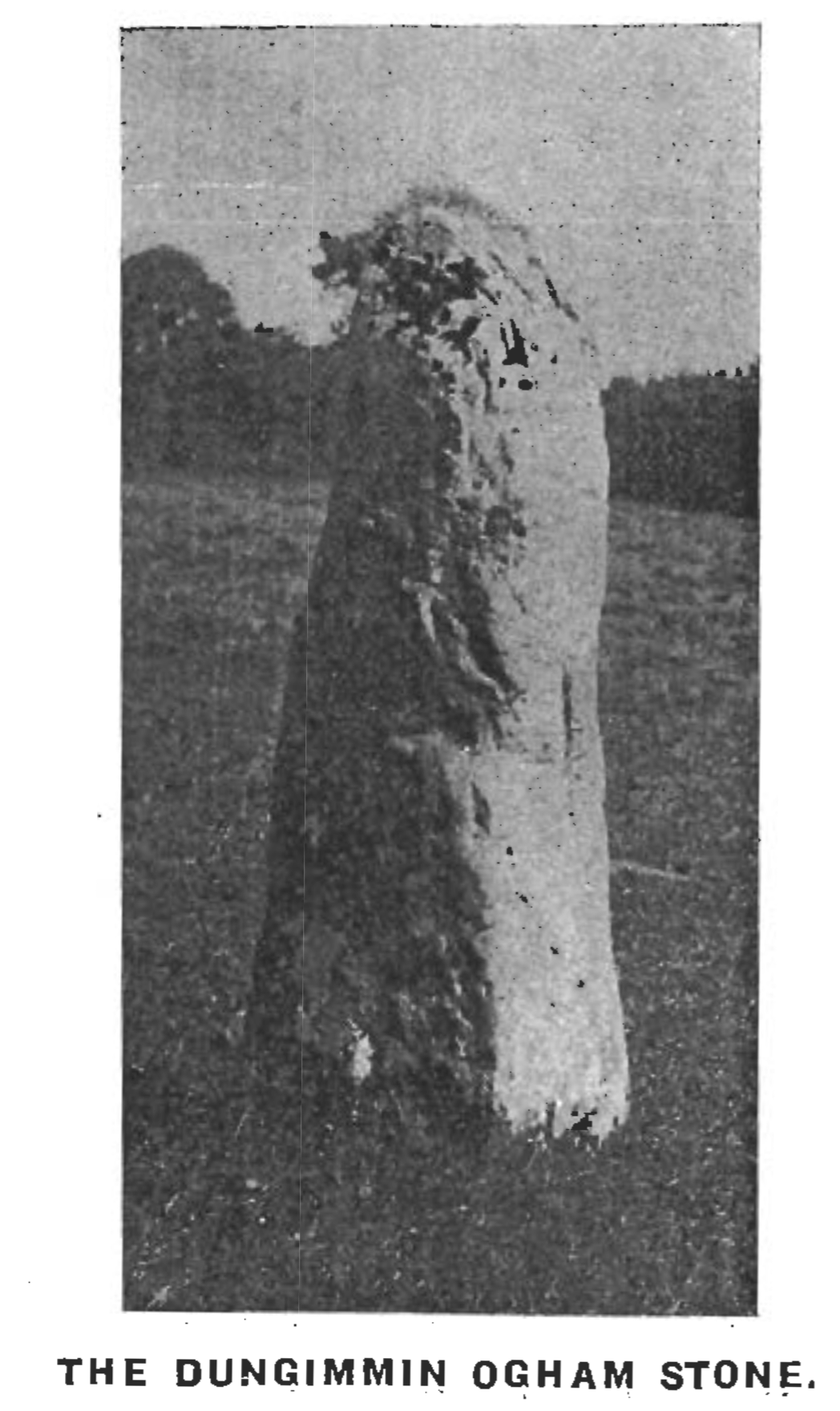

The Dungummin Ogham Stone, also known as the Clonkeiffy standing stone, is an ancient monument found on a field near a crossroads on the R194 road, south of Ballyjamesduff, County Cavan, in Ireland.

The Ogham stone is sandstone, is about 1.6m tall, 0.48m wide and 0.36m in thickness, tapering in the cross section almost to a point. The inscription on the north-western side is a personal name, ᚑᚃᚑᚋᚐᚅᚔ "OVOMANI". The western side of the stone is damaged. It was dated by S. Ziegler c. 500 – c. 550AD. The south side carries two crosses; in the west and north a cross is engraved.

== See also ==
- Killycluggin Stone
- Cloonmorris Ogham stone

== Bibliography ==
- Joseph B. Meehan: Cavan ogham stones: II, The Dungimmin Ogham 1920
- Damien McManus: A Guide to Ogam. An Sagart, Maynooth 1991, ISBN 1-870684-17-6.
- Philip I. Powell: The Ogham Stones of Ireland: The Complete & Illustrated Index 2011
- Sabine Ziegler: Die Sprache der altirischen Ogam-Inschriften. Vandenhoeck & Ruprecht, Göttingen 1994, ISBN 3-525-26225-6
