= Cloonmorris Ogham stone =

Ancient monument in County Leitrim, Ireland

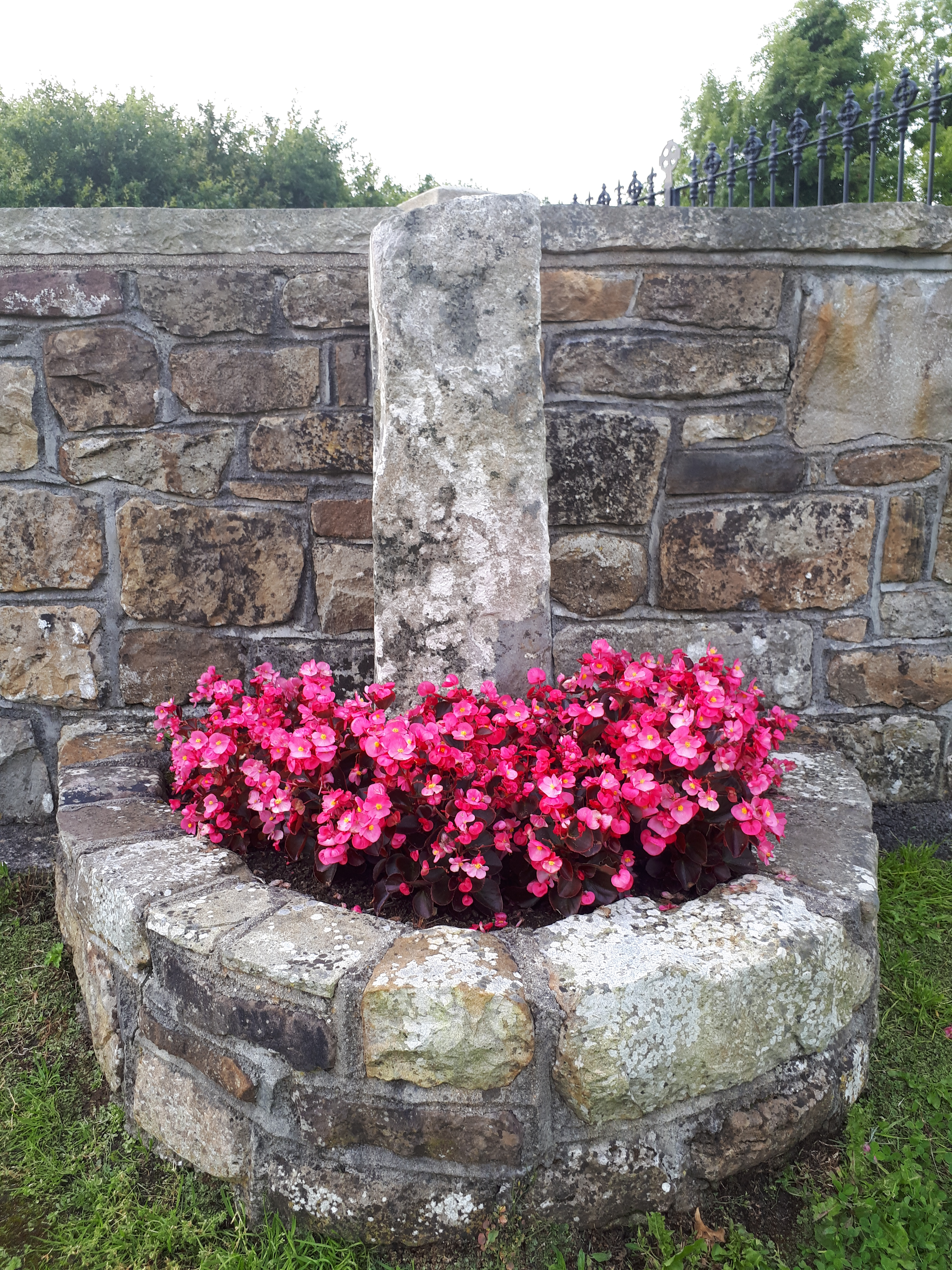
The Cloonmorris Ogham Stone

The Cloonmorris Ogham Stone is an ancient monument at Saint Michael's Church, Bornacoola, County Leitrim, in Ireland.

== Description ==
It is the only Ogham inscribed stone to be recorded in County Leitrim. First examined by Mac Neill in 1909, the stone then marked the Kellagher family burial plot "opposite the middle of the eastern gable of the ruin" of Cloonmorris church. The c. 0.85m long stone dates to c. 400 – c. 550, has an ecclesiastical association, and is not definitely post-apocope.

The defaced inscription makes accurate reading difficult. The inscription reads G..T..........QENUVEN, or QENUVEN[--, expanding to "QENUVEN[DI--" and translating to "QVENVENDANI", "(hair of the) head" + "fair" + diminutive suffix. Korlev interpreted the inscription as "G(A)T[TAGNI MAQI MUCOI (?)] QENUVEN[DI]" while Gippert (1978) suggested the inscription was "QENOVENAGNI MAQI C MUCOI LUGUDDECCAS" marking the genealogy Cenannяn m. Ceise m. Lugdech?

MacNeill thought the stone was probably the memorial of one Qenuvin-dagnas (Irish: Ceanannán, Ceannán). In Wales the name Qennovindagni occurs on a British-Latin inscription at Parcau near Whitland in Carmarthenshire, and is believed to identify a person of Gaelic, rather than Brythonic, origin. (Note: In Ireland "Saint Ceanannan" has a feast day of 29 March, but another Saint named "Cenannán m. Áil of the Airgialla" is also recorded. The Saint "Sinchell (Sinell) the Elder" of Offaly (and Leitrim) was supposedly a son of "Ceanannan" (The Annals of the Four Masters states- 548: St. Sincheall the elder, son of Ceanannan, Abbot of Cill Achaidh Dromafoda, died on the twenty sixth day of March. Thirty and three hundred years was the length of his life).) Scholars noted the Cloonmorris is "hardly a stone's throw from the boundary" between Longford and Leitrim, the stone standing inside the historic Conmhaicne territory once separating the Kingdom of Meath from Connacht.

In 1978 the stone was moved and enclosed on a pedestal near the churchyard entrance, but in doing so was placed into an inverted (top-down) position.

== See also ==
- Dungummin Ogham Stone

== Notes and references ==
=== References ===
- Davies, Graham-Campbell, ed. (1999a). "Celtic Inscribed Stones" (CLOOM/1 ed.). University College London.
- Davies, Graham-Campbell, ed. (1999b). "Celtic Inscribed Stones" (HENLL/1 ed.). University College London.
- Swift, Catherine (2002). "Ogam Stones in Sligo and their Context". In Timoney, M.A. (ed.). Celebration of Sligo: First Essays for Sligo Field Club. Sligo Field Club. pp. 127–140. ISBN 978-0-9528091-1-1.
- MacNeill, John (1909). "Ogham Inscription at Cloonmorris, Co. Leitrim" (PDF). The Journal of the Royal Society of Antiquaries of Ireland. Proceedings and papers. Fifth series. XXXIX: 132–136.
- Gippert, Jost (1996). "Ogam Inscription: CIIC no. 002". TITUS, Information Center of the Society for Indo-European Studies.
- Clancy, Thomas Owen (2013). "Cenannán m. Áil of the Airgialla". University of Glasgow's School of Humanities (Celtic & Gaelic, and HATII).
- O'Donovan, John, ed. (1856). Annála Rioghachta Éireann. Annals of the Kingdom of Ireland by the Four Masters ... with a Translation and Copious Notes. 7 vols. Translated by O'Donovan (2nd ed.). Dublin: Royal Irish Academy. CELT editions. Full scans at Internet Archive: Vol. 1; Vol. 2; Vol. 3; Vol. 4; Vol. 5; Vol. 6; Indices.
- O'Clery, Michael; O'Donovan, John; Reeves, William; Todd, James Henthorn (1864). The martyrology of Donegal: a calendar of the saints of Ireland (PDF). Dublin: Printed for the Irish Archaeological and Celtic Society by A. Thom.
