= Luguaedon of Inchagoill =

Irish hermit

Luguaedon of Inchagoill (also Lugnad, Lugnaedon, fl. c. 500?) was an Irish hermit.

Luguaedon is known from a remarkable upright, decorated cross-slab stone on the island of Inchagoill, Lough Corrib, County Galway. It reads "LIE LUGUAEDON MACCI MENUEH" ('the stone of Luguaedon son of Menueh'), which may be a transliteration of an older Ogham inscription.

Luguaedon's origins are obscure, and may have been quite early in the early Irish Christian era. Traditions recorded in the late 19th and early 20th centuries state that Luguaedon had been British (Britons (historical)) – the name of the island means "the stranger's island." He is also said in local folklore to have been Saint Patrick’s nephew and navigator.

Though the usual reading of the name is "Luguaedon Macci Menueh", Damian McManus posits that it may be an earlier form, "moccu", which denoted a relationship or kinship to a tribe, rather than a dynastic blood relationship (see Irish name).

The stone is 1 metre tall and stands among the other stones surrounding the church.
