= Inchagoill =

Native name: Inis an Ghaill Crabhthigh
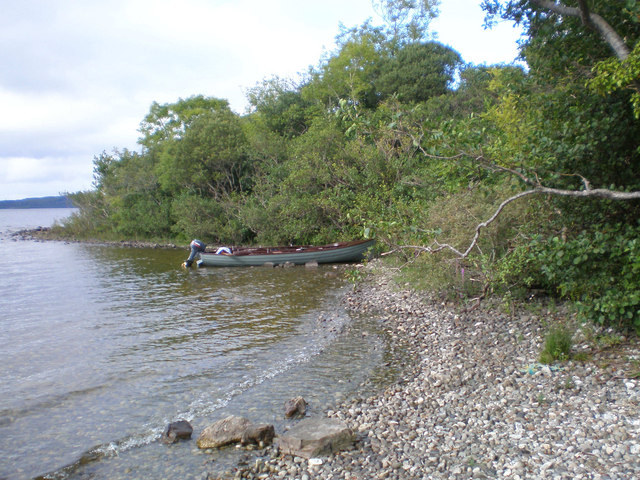
- Landing point

- Location within Ireland

Geography
- Location: Lough Corrib
- Coordinates: 53.486°N 9.317°W
- Area: 0.3268 km^{2} (0.1262 sq mi)
- Highest elevation: 24 m (79 ft)

Administration
- Ireland
- Province: Connacht
- County: Galway
- Barony: Ross

Demographics
- Population: 0

Inchagoill
- Inis an Ghaill Crabhthigh (Irish)
- Interactive map of Inchagoill

History
- Built: 6th–12th century AD

Site notes
- Architectural style: Romanesque
- Owner: State

National monument of Ireland
- Official name: Inchagoill Early Medieval Ecclesiastical Site
- Reference no.: 412

Inchagoill is an island in Lough Corrib, Ireland. Its Christian ruins constitute an Irish National Monument. The island name means "Island of the devout foreigner."

== Location ==
Inchagoill is an island of 32.68 ha (80.8 acres) located in the northwest part of Lough Corrib. It lies halfway between Oughterard and Cong. Burr Island (1.18 ha (2.9 acres)) lies immediately to the north.

== Ruins and monuments ==
=== St. Patrick's Church ===
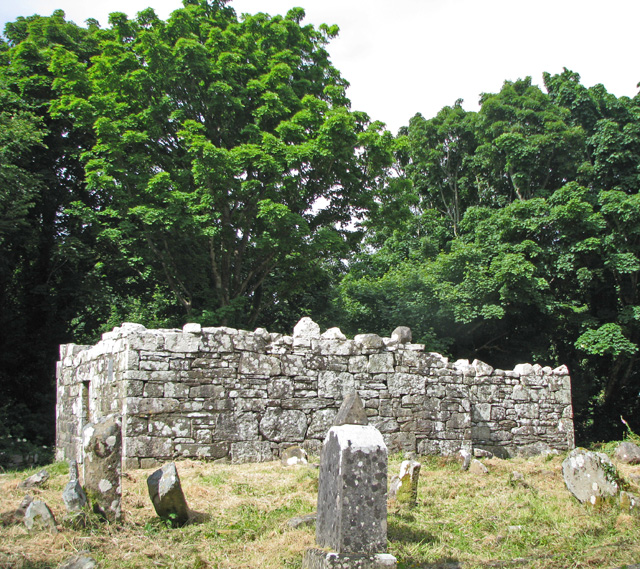
Templepatrick

Also called Templepatrick (Teampall Phádraig), its construction was traditionally attributed to Saint Patrick and his nephew Lugnad, who is credited with bringing him to Ireland by boat; it is more likely to date to the 6th or 7th century AD.

=== Lugnad's stone ===
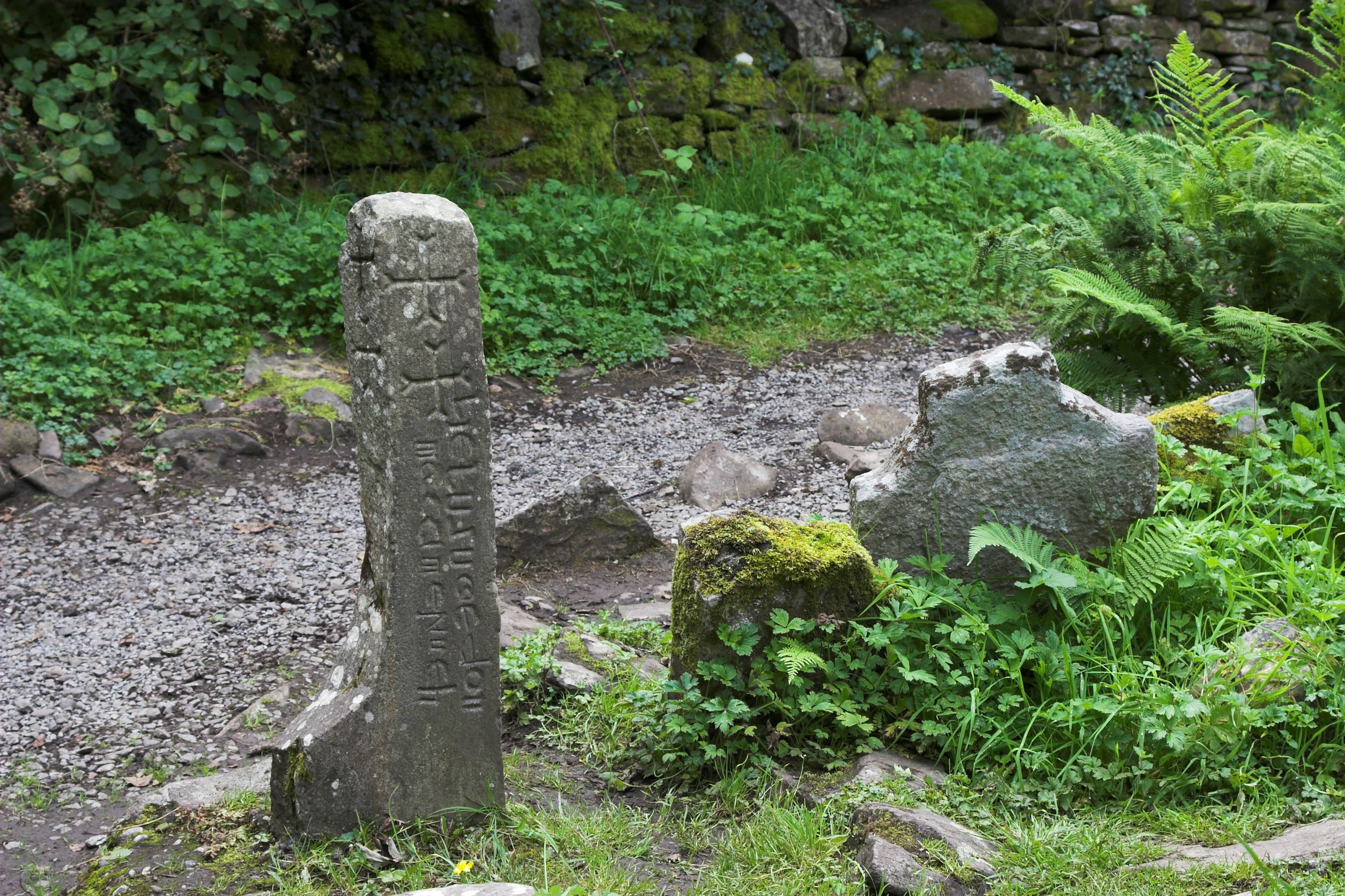
The stone

This stone, of Silurian grit and shaped like a rudder, bears the inscription Lia Lugnaedon Macc Limenueh ("Stone of Lugnad son of Limenueh", the latter being Patrick's sister Liamain; there are many variant readings). It is the oldest inscription in Ireland in the Latin alphabet (all earlier inscriptions are in Ogham). The pillar is known as 'Lugnaedon Pillar', a piece of Silurian grit stone, about two feet high with an incised cross on the north side, and two such crosses on each of the other sides. The stone bears an inscription "Lie Lugnaedon Macc Li Menueh", translated, it means "The stone of Lugnaedon, son of Limenueh", the sister of St. Patrick. The pillar dates back to the 6th century. This pillar is the remains of a pre-Christian era Ogham stone, and was sanctified with crosses after it was purged of its pagan inscription, by the founder of the church.

=== Templenaneeve ===
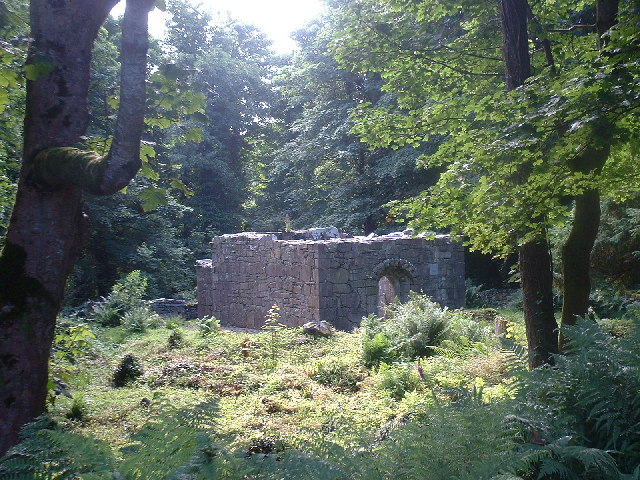
Templenaneeve, with sandstone doorway visible

In Irish Teampall na Naoimh, "church of the saints."

A flagged path of 72 m (79 yd) in length connects the two churches. Templenaneeve is Hiberno-Romanesque church with a 12th-century decorated arched doorway; its sculpted heads are similar to those at Annaghdown Abbey. The incised slab is 8th century, and there are three bullauns as well. The chancel is semi-circular and undecorated.

=== Graveyard ===
The graveyard is also ancient; buried there is Muirgheas O'Nioc (Muirgius ua Nioc; died 1128), coarb of Tuam. (He is often incorrectly described as Archbishop of Tuam, but that title didn't exist until 1152.) Other important families in the region also used the graveyard: Kinnaveys, Conways, Sullivans, Murphys, Lyddans, Butlers.

=== Other sites ===
A holy well (Tobernaneeve), two cross-inscribed pillars and five cross slabs.

== Today ==
An annual Mass is celebrated on the island, and local cruise companies offer tourist expeditions to the island.

Coillte have extensively afforested the island.
