= Mary O'Connell (1778–1836) =

Wife of Daniel O'Connell

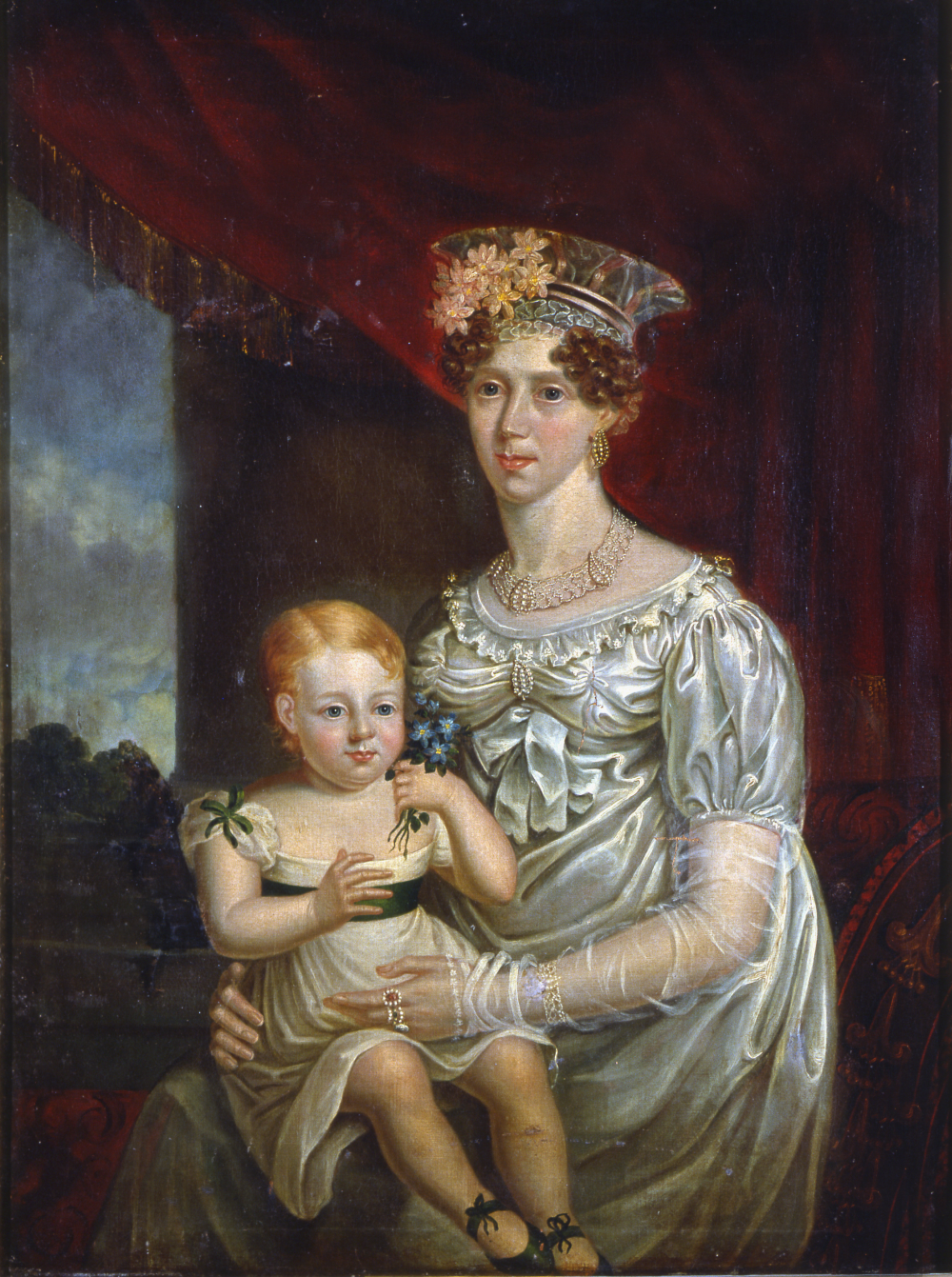
- Portrait of O'Connell by John Gubbins
- Born: 25 September 1778; Tralee, County Kerry, Kingdom of Ireland
- Died: 31 October 1836 (aged 58); Derrynane House, County Kerry, Kingdom of Ireland
- Resting place: Abbey Island, Derrynane, Republic of Ireland
- Spouse: Daniel O'Connell
- Children: Maurice; Ellen; Catherine; Timothy; Elizabeth; John; Morgan; Daniel

Mary O'Connell (25 September 1778 – 31 October 1836) was the wife of Daniel O'Connell.

== Early life ==
Mary O'Connell was born in Tralee, County Kerry on 25 September 1778. Her father was a physician and a Protestant, Dr Thomas O'Connell. He was a widower with 3 children when he married Ellen Tuohy, O'Connell's mother and a Catholic. O'Connell was one of their 8 children. Her father died in 1785, leaving the family in poverty. In 1800, O'Connell began secret correspondence with her distant cousin, Daniel O'Connell. They most likely met at a local social function in County Kerry. Daniel was fearful of being disinherited by his uncle Maurice "Hunting Cap" O'Connell if he married a bride without a dowry, and insisted on keeping their relationship a secret. When they were married in Dublin on 24 July 1802, his family were still unaware of their relationship. The couple lived separately until O'Connell's first pregnancy. Their fears were confirmed, and Daniel was disinherited.

== Family life ==
O'Connell went to live with her parents-in-law, Morgan and Catherine O'Connell, at the family home at Carhen. She lived there until 1805, when they bought a home on Westland Row, Dublin. Their first son, Maurice, was followed by Morgan in 1804, Ellen in 1805, and Kate in 1807. Their son Edward, born in 1808, died in 1809. In 1810, O'Connell gave birth twice, first to Elizabeth and then John. From 1812 to 1816, she had 5 more children, with only Daniel surviving to adulthood.

Daniel O'Connell bought a home on Merrion Square, Dublin in 1809 against his wife's wishes. The couple could barely afford the house. Throughout their marriage, O'Connell oversaw the family's household, managing the servants, raising the family, and acted as her husband's agent at times. As Daniel O'Connell's participations in the emancipation movement increased, he was away from his family for longer. Coupled with his financial imprudence, O'Connell's health suffered as a result. In 1817, to rebuild her health, she took her family to the spa town of Clifton, England. She returned to Dublin that summer, but left again in 1822 to live in France. She told friends that this was also to improve her health, but it was in fact due to economic necessity. She lived there frugally with her 6 children until 1824. When the couple inherited the family home of "Hunting-cap" O'Connell Derrynane House in 1825, as Daniel and his uncle had made amends, O'Connell moved her family there. Their eldest daughter married soon after, and her husband was elected to parliament in 1829. She travelled with her husband to London when the parliamentary session began.

== Later life ==
From 1830 to 1836, the O'Connells were rarely apart. With their financial difficulties resolved and their children married. A scandal appeared in 1832, when a pamphlet was published by Ellen Courtenay stating that Daniel O'Connell was the father of her illegitimate son. The story erupted again in 1836, and received a large amount of publicity. Despite her poor health, O'Connell joined her husband on a political tour in England in April 1836 to offset the negative coverage. She went to Tunbridge Wells, Kent to take the waters in May 1836, returning to Derrynane in August. O'Connell died on 31 October 1836 at Derrynane, and was buried at the O'Connell tomb on the Abbey Island.

A portrait of her by John Gubbins hangs in Derrynane House. Her correspondence is held as part of the O'Connell collection in the National Library of Ireland and in the University College Dublin Archives.
