= Derrynane =

Derrynane Doire Fhíonáin
- Village
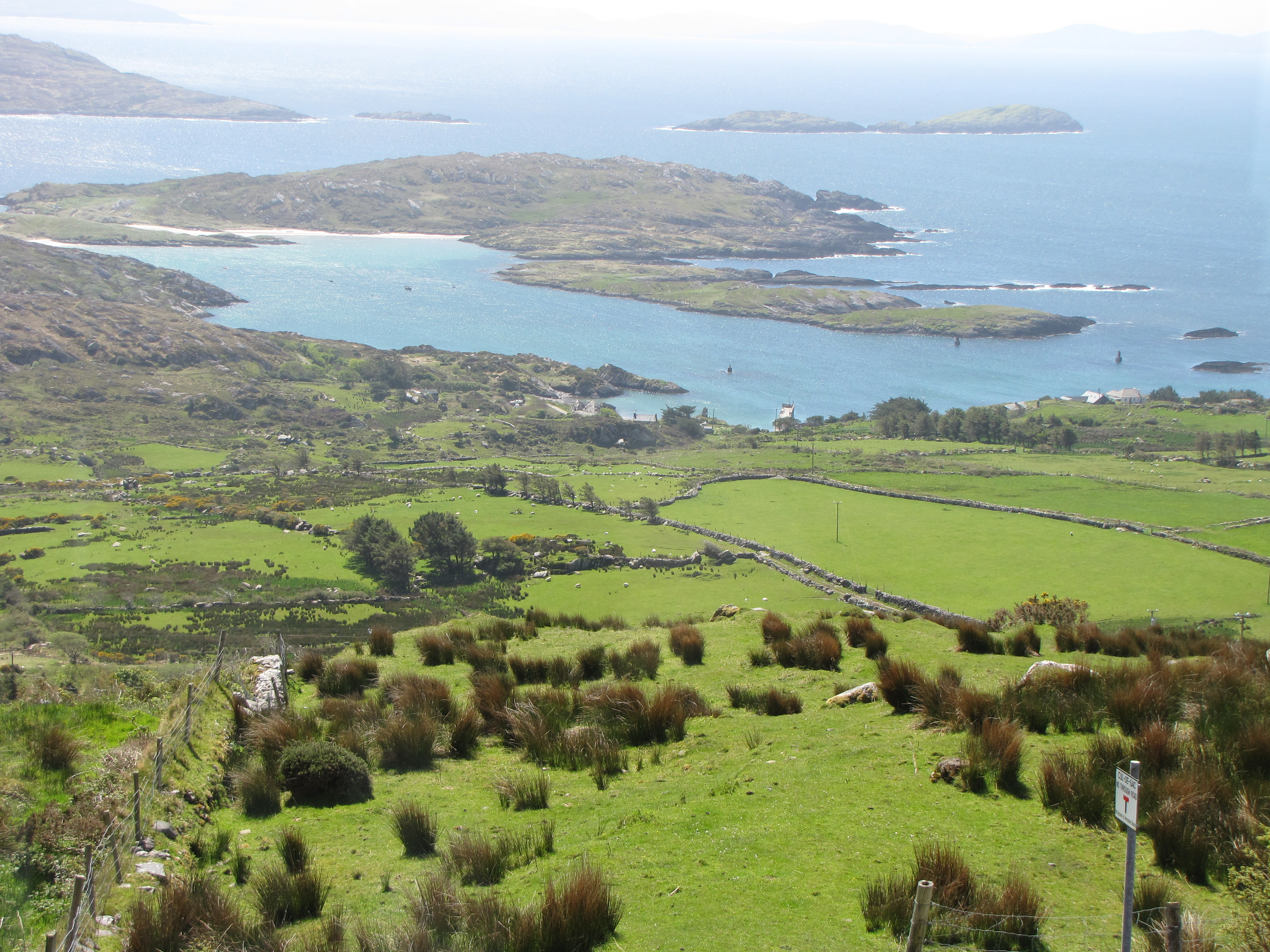
- Derrynane Bay

- Location in Ireland
- Coordinates: 51°45′55″N 10°07′15″W
- Country: Ireland
- Province: Munster
- County: County Kerry
- Time zone: UTC+0 (WET)
  - Summer (DST): UTC-1 (IST (WEST))
- Irish Grid Reference: V543587

Derrynane, officially Darrynane (Irish: Doire Fhíonáin, meaning 'oak-wood of Fíonán'), is a small village in the civil parish of Kilcrohane in County Kerry, Ireland. It is located on the Iveragh peninsula, just off the N70 national primary road near Caherdaniel on the shores of Derrynane Bay.

== History ==
A dolmen (or Stone Age passage grave) in the area may date from 3000 BC. Around Derrynane, sites dating from 2000 BC, are associated with the Beaker people who were mining for copper in the area.

Saint Fionan founded a monastery in the area in the 6th century.

In the 18th century, Derrynane harbour became a thriving centre for trade with France and Spain.

== Places of interest ==
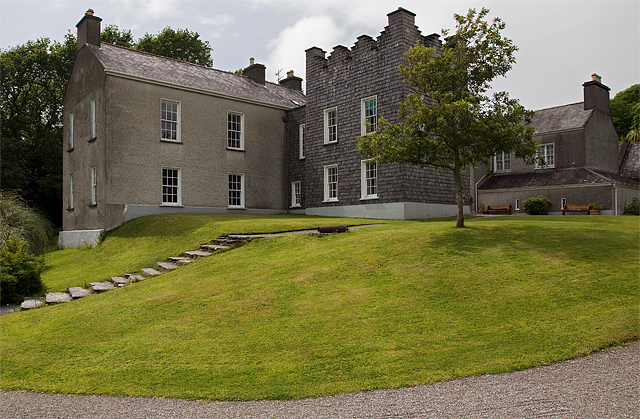
Derrynane House

Derrynane is the site of Derrynane Abbey and Derrynane House. The latter was the home of Daniel O'Connell and is now a National Monument and part of a 320-acre (1.3 km^{2}) national historic park.

Staigue Fort, one of Ireland's finest examples of an ancient ringfort, is located approximately 7 kilometers east from Derrynane. Another stone ringfort, Loher Cashel, lies 4 km to the northwest.

There are sightseeing trips to the Skellig Islands from Bunavalla daily during the summer season (weather dependent).

== Sport ==
Caherdaniel Village is home to Derrynane Gaelic Athletic Association club.

== People ==
- Benoîte Groult (1920–2016), a French journalist and writer, had a holiday home in the area and was visited there by the French president François Mitterrand in 1988.
- Eibhlín Dubh Ní Chonaill (c. 1743–c. 1800), a member of the O'Connell family, was a poet and the composer of 'Caoineadh Airt Uí Laoghaire'.

== See also ==
- List of towns and villages in Ireland
