= Máire Ní Dhonnchadha Dhuibh =

18th century Irish poet

- Born: c. 1702; Glenflesk, County Kerry
- Died: 1795 (aged 92–93) ?

Máire Ní Dhonnchadha Dhuibh (c. 1702-1795?) was an Irish poet.

== Life ==
Máire Ní Dhonnchadha Dhuibh was born in Glenflesk, County Kerry around 1702. She was the daughter of Domhnall Ó Donnchadha and his wife Alice (née Ferriter). She was descended from Uí Dhonnchadha an Ghleanna (O'Donoghue of the Glens). Her branch of the family, who settled in a place called Anees in Glenflesk, used the suffix "Dubh". Séafraidh Ó Donnchadha was her uncle and also a poet, known for hosting poets and scribes at Killaha castle, near Killarney.

Around 1718, she married Domhnall Mór Ó Conaill (died 1770), and she is believed to have overseen the construction of the family home, Derrynane House. The couple had 22 children, with four sons and eight daughters surviving to adulthood. Her son, Maurice O'Connell, inherited Derrynane House. Her most famous daughter is Eibhlín Dubh Ní Chonaill a fellow poet. Oral tradition tells of Máire Ní Dhuibh's pride, determination and wittiness, with conjecture that her grandson, Daniel O'Connell, inherited her intellectual and orating abilities. She is believed to have died around 1795.
