= Ellen Fitzsimon =

Irish poet

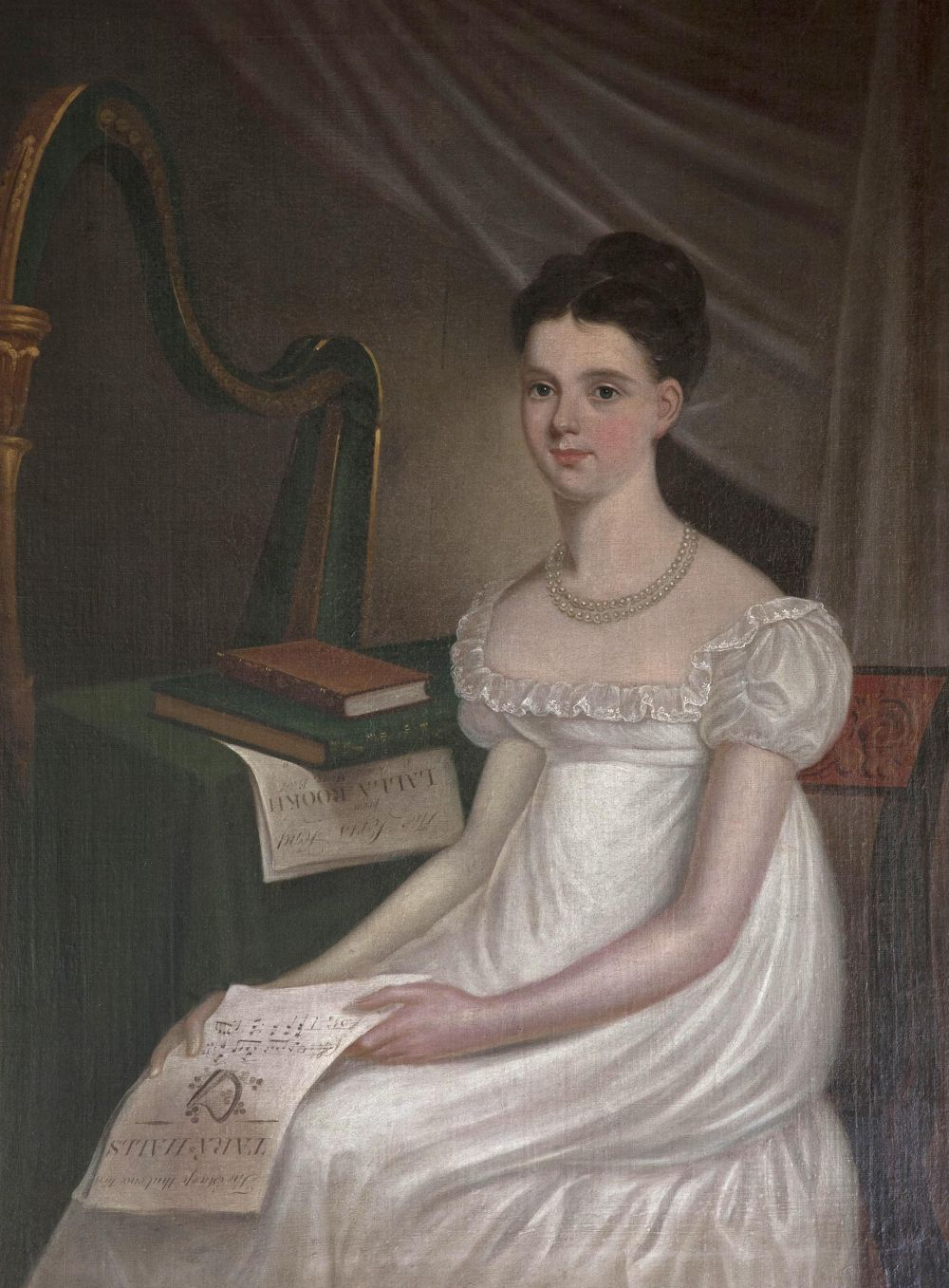
- Born: Ellen Bridget O'Connell; 1805; Derrynane House, County Kerry
- Died: 27 January 1883 (aged 77–78); Blackheath, London, England
- Resting place: Kensal Green Cemetery
- Spouse: Christopher Fitzsimon
- Parent(s): Daniel O'Connell and Mary O'Connell

Ellen Fitzsimon (1805 – 27 January 1883) was an Irish poet from a politically prominent family. Her work was published in major periodicals, and at least two of her poems became songs associated with the Irish diaspora.

== Early life ==
Ellen Fitzsimon was born Ellen Bridget O'Connell at Derrynane House, County Kerry, the third child and eldest daughter of Daniel and Mary O'Connell. She was well educated and spoke a number of languages. She was a close political ally of her father, and often included her maiden name in her published bylines, to remind readers of their connection.

== Literary career ==
Fitzsimon's poems appeared in Irish Monthly, The Nation, The Month, Duffy's Fireside Magazine, and the Dublin Review. A single book of poems, Derrynane Abbey in 1832, and other Poems, was published in 1863. Her sentimental verses about Irish emigration were described as "pathetic and beautiful compositions" in 1911. She was said to be working on a biography of her father in her later years.

== Publications ==
- Derrynane Abbey in 1832, and other poems (1863)
- "Pay for the Ounces: A Legend of Italy" (1864, story)
- "Sonnet" (1873)
- "The Legend of St. Catherine of Alexandria" (1873)
- "The Pleasant Places of the Long Ago" (1874)
- "The Bird at Mass" (1874)
- "The Song of the Irish Emigrant in America" (1907)

== Personal life ==
On 25 July 1825, O'Connell married Christopher Fitzsimon, Esq., of Glencullen, County Dublin. Her husband was Clerk of the Crown and Hanaper and MP for County Dublin. The couple had thirteen children, five of whom died in infancy. Their daughter Ellen married Charles Bianconi Jr., son of entrepreneur Charles Bianconi.

Fitzsimon's husband died in 1856, and she died in 1883, in her seventies, at her daughter's house in Blackheath. She is buried in Kensal Green Cemetery. She was survived by four of her children: Kathleen (Mrs. George Ludlow Kennedy Hewett), Ellen (Mrs. Bianconi), Henry, and Christopher. Her grave is in Kensal Green Cemetery in London.
