= Maurice O'Connell (landowner) =

Irish landowner and smuggler (1728–1825)

Maurice "Hunting Cap" O'Connell
- Murrish-a-Caupeen
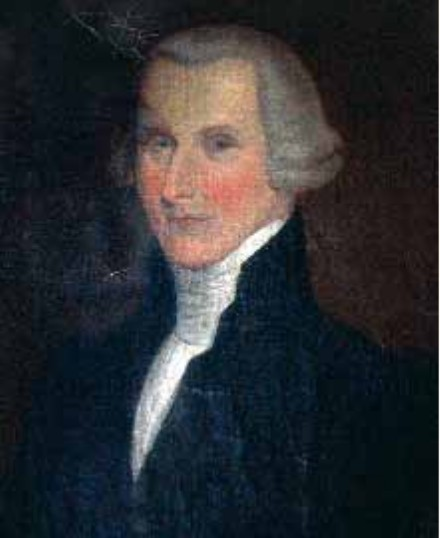
- Born: 1728; Iveragh peninsula, County Kerry, Ireland
- Died: 10 February 1825 (aged 96–97); Derrynane House, County Kerry
- Resting place: Abbey Island, Derrynane
- Spouse: Mary Cantillon

Maurice "Hunting Cap" O'Connell (Irish: Murrish-a-Caupeen; 1728 – 10 February 1825) was a landowner and smuggler, and uncle of Daniel O'Connell.

== Early life and family ==
Maurice O'Connell was born in 1728 at Derrynane House on the Iveragh peninsula, County Kerry, the second surviving son of Daniel O'Connell or Donal Mór (died 1770) and Máire Ní Dhonnchadha Dhuibh. O'Connell was one of 22 children, with five sons and eight daughters surviving to adulthood. His grandfather, John O'Connell (died 1741), was a captain in King James II's guard at Aughrim. O'Connell was educated in Cork. After the death of his older brother, John, in 1751 he inherited Derrynane. In 1758, he married Mary (died 1791), the eldest daughter of Robert Cantillon of Ballyphillip, County Limerick. She was a relative of Richard Cantillon and had a dowry of £1,000.

== Career ==
He told the antiquary Charles Smith that "We have peace in these glens and amid their seclusion ... profess the beloved faith of our fathers". He maintained a regular correspondence with his youngest brother Daniel Charles O'Connell, a French army officer, taking him in 1793 after his escape from revolutionary France. O'Connell gave him a gift of 300 guineas which allowed Daniel Charles to settle in London and negotiate for the formation of the Catholic Irish Brigade.

To avoid the tax on beaver hats worn by the gentry, O'Connell wore a huntsman's velvet cap, earning him the nickname of "Hunting Cap" or "Murrish-a-Caupeen". Uninterested in high society and politics, O'Connell preferred to live in rural County Kerry in obscurity, amassing a fortune despite his generosity and hospitality. He earned this fortune from small business enterprises, but also from smuggling. A warrant was issued for O'Connell and his brother Morgan for smuggling in September 1782 when a revenue inspector was beaten by a crowd in the O'Connell's employ. Through his friendship with Dominick Trant, they did not appear in the Dublin High Court but at the Tralee assizes, with the charges against him being thrown out. On 27 April 1793, O'Connell was appointed a deputy governor of County Kerry, and later on 18 July 1793, a Justice of the peace. He attended meetings of the grand jury until 1815, at which point he was nearly blind. In December 1796, he notified the authorities when a French fleet entered Bantry Bay. Having been won over by John Crosbie, O'Connell became a supporter of Act of Union 1801.

Having no children himself, O'Connell supported many of his relatives, most famously his nephew Daniel O'Connell from around 1780. He raised Daniel at Derrynane House, making him his heir presumptive. He supported him financially as he trained for the bar. Owing to O'Connell's insistence that Daniel marry advantageously, Daniel concealed his marriage to his cousin Mary O'Connell who had no dowry. O'Connell disowned Daniel when he learnt of the marriage.

== Death ==
O'Connell died on 10 February 1825, at the age of 97. He had composed his own epitaph: "the chief ambition of his long and prosperous life was to elevate an ancient family from unmerited and unjust oppression". He was buried on Abbey Island, Derrynane with his parents. He left a fortune of £54,000. Having reconciled with his nephew Daniel, he left him Derrynane abbey and an annual income of approximately £4,000.
