= Loher Cashel =

- Cathair an Lóthair (Irish)
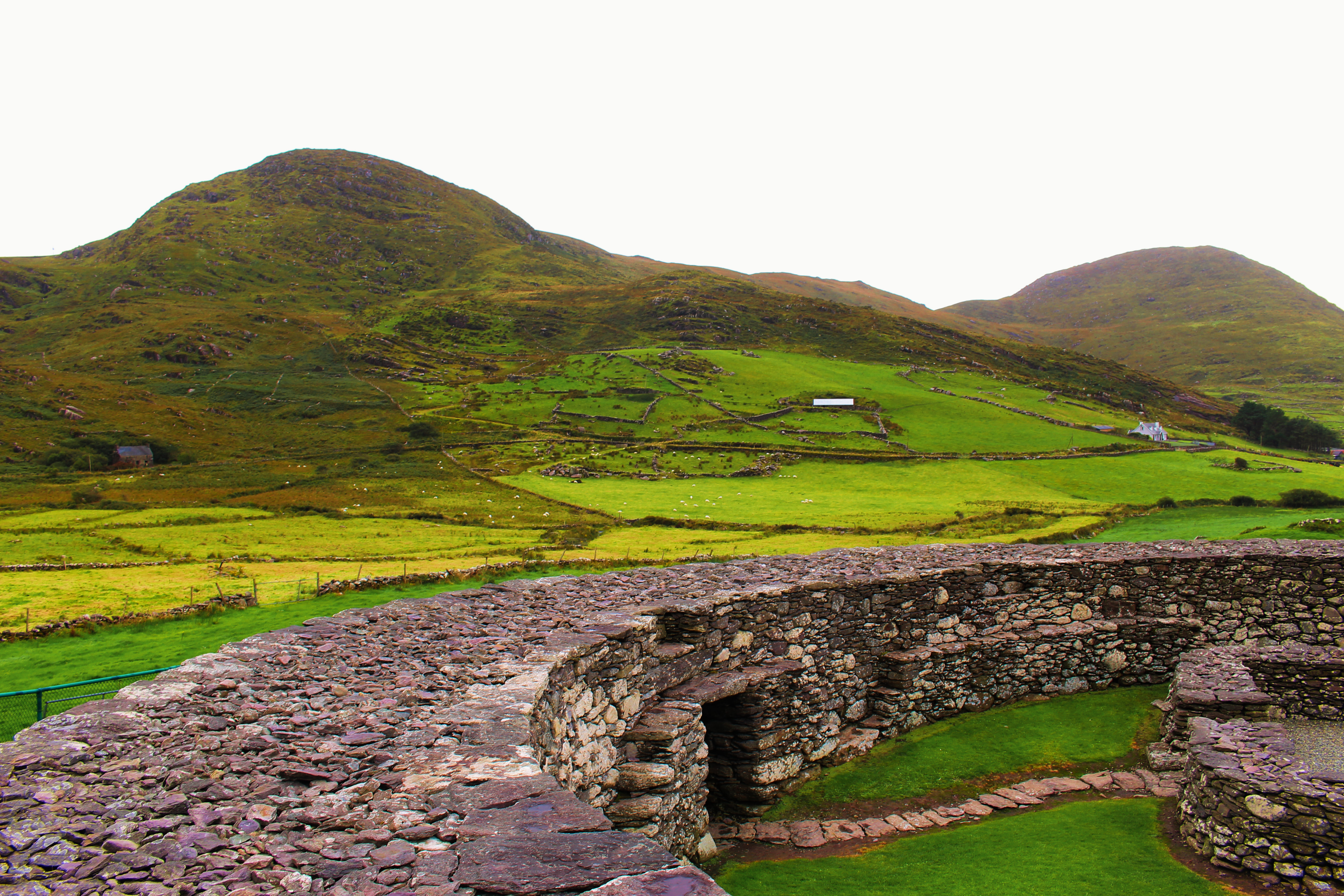

- Location within Ireland
- 51.786111°N 10.165556°W
- Type: stone ringfort
- Location: Loher, Derrynane, County Kerry, Ireland

History
- Built: c. 9th century AD

Site notes
- Elevation: 60 m (200 ft)
- Height: 3 m (9.8 ft)
- Architectural style: Gaelic Ireland
- Owner: State

National monument of Ireland
- Official name: Loher Cashel
- Reference no.: 611

Loher Cashel is a stone ringfort (cashel) and National Monument located on the Iveragh Peninsula, Ireland.

== Location ==
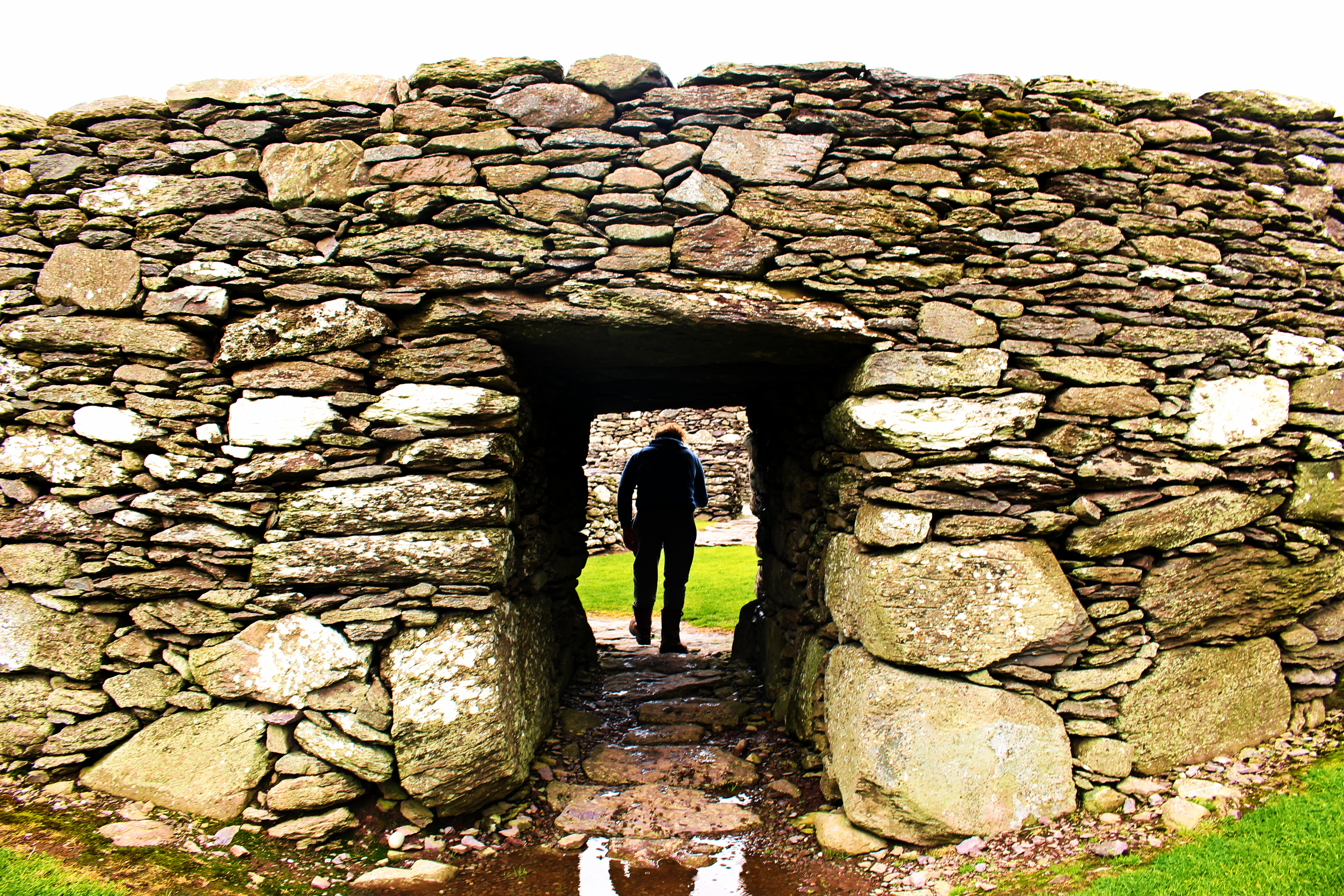
The entrance way. Note the dry stone slabs that form the walls.

Loher Cashel is situated on the western edge of the Iveragh Peninsula overlooking Ballinskelligs Bay, 3.9 km (2.4 mi) northwest of Derrynane. This location may have been chosen for its view of Skellig Michael.

== History ==
The cashel was built around the 9th century AD as a defended farmstead. It was recently reconstructed.

== Description ==
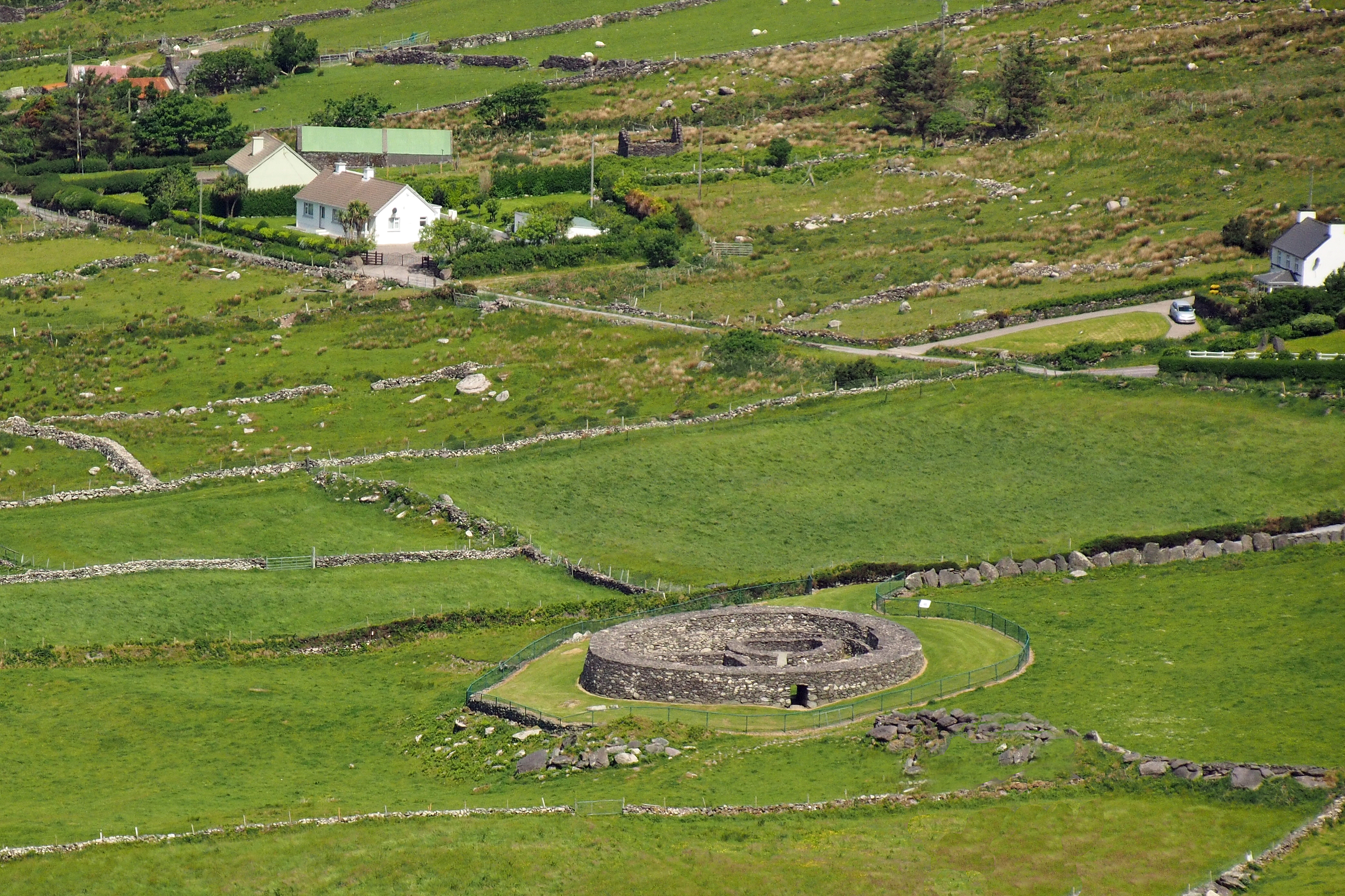
Aerial view of the cashel and surrounding countryside.

This is a circular stone ringfort (caiseal) of internal diameter 20 m (66 ft) with outer walls over 2 m (6 ft 7 in) high and 3 m (9.8 ft) thick accessible by stairways. It is built of drystone with gaps filled in with rubble.

In the interior are a large round house and a smaller rectangular house; archaeology has shown that these were preceded by wooden buildings. A souterrain was located in the circular house.

The entrance has a stone-lined passage similar to that at Staigue stone fort.
