= 1832 United Kingdom general election in Ireland =

Election which saw the rise of the Repeal Association led by Daniel O'Connell

- 8 December 1832 – 8 January 1833

105 of the 658 seats to the House of Commons
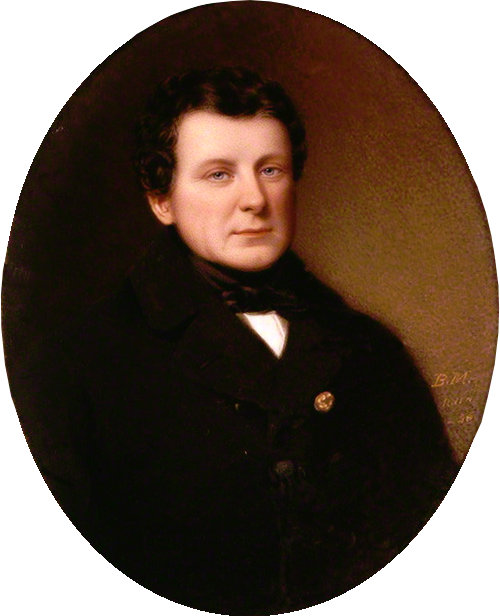

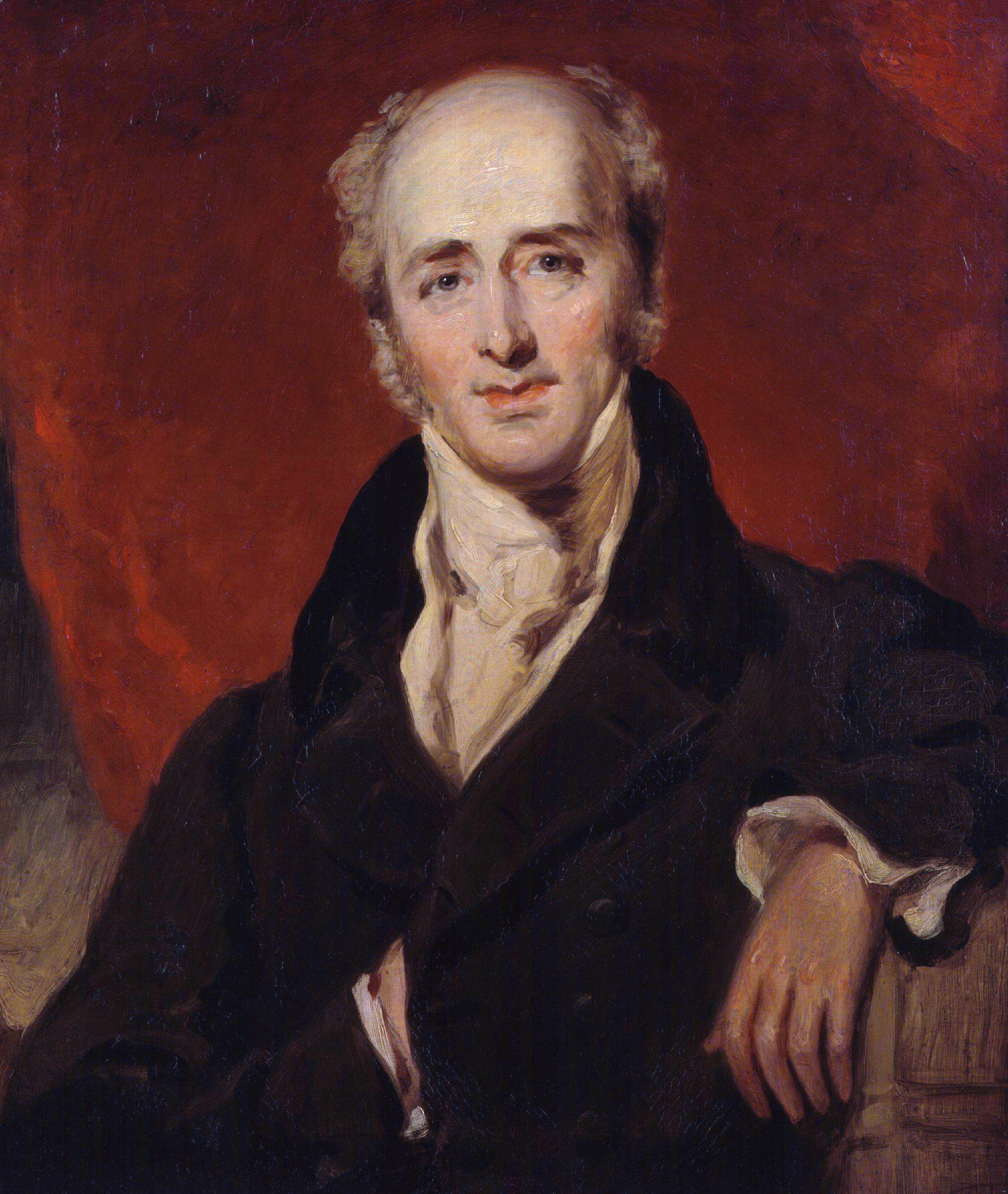

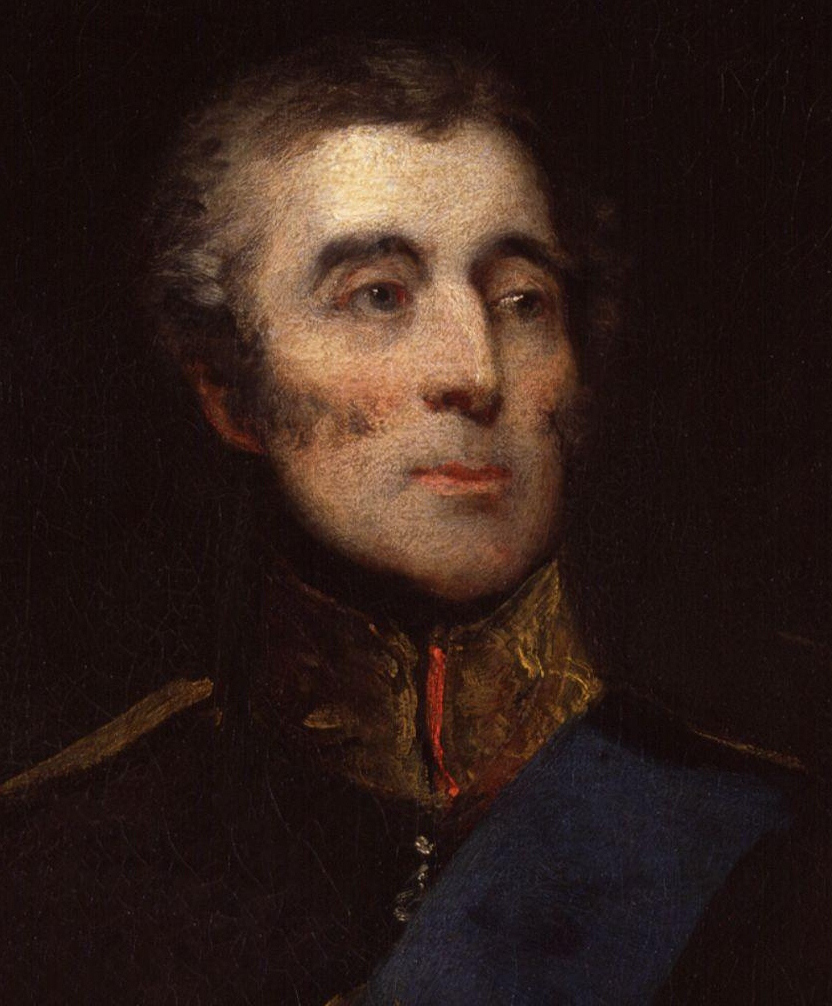
	First party	Second party	Third party
Leader	Daniel O'Connell	Earl Grey	Duke of Wellington
Party	Irish Repeal	Whig	Tory
Leader since		22 November 1830	22 January 1828
Leader's seat	Dublin City	House of Lords	House of Lords
Seats won	42	33	30
Popular vote	31,773	29,013	28,030
Percentage	34.6%	33.3%	32.1%
- Results of the 1832 election in Ireland

The 1832 United Kingdom general election in Ireland saw the emergence of the Repeal Association as a major political movement in Ireland. The Association, led by Daniel O'Connell, aimed to repeal the 1800 Acts of Union and restore Ireland to the status enjoyed after the reforms of 1782, while maintaining Catholic emancipation.

This was the first election following the Representation of the People (Ireland) Act 1832 and the Parliamentary Boundaries (Ireland) Act 1832, which saw an increase in the Irish representation from 100 to 105 MPs. The number of seats won were: Repeal (42), Whig (33), and Tory (30).

== Results ==
Party	Seats	Seats change	Votes	%	% Change
Irish Repeal	42	▲42	31,773	34.6	
Whig	33	▼32	29,013	33.3	
Tory	30	▼6	28,030	32.1	
Total	105	▲5	88,816	100	

Popular vote
Irish Repeal	35.77%
Whigs	32.67%
Tories	31.56%

Parliamentary seats
Irish Repeal	40.78%
Whigs	32.04%
Tories	27.18%

== See also ==
- History of Ireland (1801–1923)
