= Daniel O'Connell =

Irish political leader (1775–1847)

Daniel O'Connell Dónall Ó Conaill
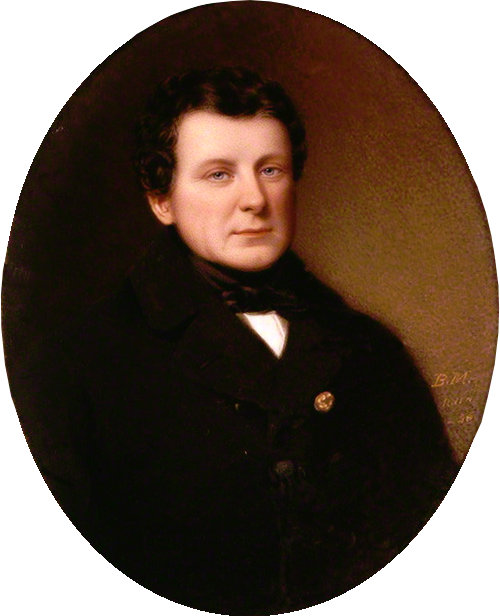
- Portrait by Bernard Mulrenin, 1836

Member of Parliament for County Clare
- In office 5 July 1828 – 29 July 1830
- Preceded by: William Vesey-FitzGerald
- Succeeded by: William Macnamara

Member of Parliament for Dublin City
- In office 5 August 1837 – 10 July 1841
- Preceded by: George Hamilton
- In office 22 December 1832 – 16 May 1836
- Preceded by: Sir Frederick Shaw
- Succeeded by: George Hamilton

Lord Mayor of Dublin
- In office 1841–1842
- Preceded by: Sir John Kingston James
- Succeeded by: George Roe

Member of Parliament for County Cork
- In office 15 July 1841 – 15 May 1847
- Preceded by: Garrett Standish Barry
- Succeeded by: Edmund Burke Roche

Personal details
- Born: 6 August 1775 Carhan, County Kerry, Ireland
- Died: 15 May 1847 (aged 71) Genoa, Kingdom of Sardinia
- Resting place: Glasnevin Cemetery, Dublin
- Party: Radicals; Repeal Association
- Spouse: Mary O'Connell (m. 1802; died 1836)
- Children: Maurice; Ellen; Catherine; Timothy; Evie; John; Morgan; Daniel
- Education: Lincoln's Inn; King's Inns
- Occupation: Barrister, political activist, politician

Military service
- Allegiance: Kingdom of Ireland
- Branch/service: Yeomanry
- Years of service: 1797
- Unit: Lawyer's Artillery Corps

Daniel O'Connell (Irish: Dónall Ó Conaill; 6 August 1775 – 15 May 1847), hailed in his time as The Liberator, was the acknowledged political leader of Ireland's Catholic majority in the first half of the 19th century. His mobilisation of Catholic Ireland, down to the poorest class of tenant farmers, secured the final installment of Catholic emancipation in 1829 and allowed him to take a seat in the United Kingdom Parliament to which he had been twice elected.

At Westminster, O'Connell championed liberal and reform causes (being internationally renowned as an abolitionist) but he failed in his declared objective for Ireland – the repeal of the Act of Union 1800 and the restoration of an Irish Parliament.

In 1843, the Dublin Castle administration used troops to induce O'Connell to call a halt to an unprecedented campaign of open-air mass meetings. The loss of prestige, combined with the perceived indifference to the Great Famine of the Whigs whom he had supported in government, dispirited and divided his following. In his final year, criticism of his political compromises and of his system of patronage split the national movement that he had singularly led.

Irish nationalists continued to dispute O'Connell's legacy — honoured in 1922 in the renaming of Dublin's principal thoroughfare. Biographers have suggested that his combination of confessional politics and liberal principle, which had early imitators in Germany, was a forerunner of European Christian democracy.

== Early and professional life ==
=== Kerry and France ===
O'Connell was born at Carhan House, near Cahersiveen, County Kerry, to the O'Connells of Derrynane, a wealthy Roman Catholic family that, under the Penal Laws, had been able to retain land only through the medium of Protestant trustees and the forbearance of their Protestant neighbours. His parents were Morgan O'Connell and Catherine O'Mullane. The poet Eibhlín Dubh Ní Chonaill was an aunt; and Daniel Charles, Count O'Connell, an Irish Brigade officer in the service of the King of France (and twelve years a prisoner of Napoleon), an uncle. O'Connell grew up in Derrynane House, the household of his childless uncle, Maurice "Hunting Cap" O'Connell (landowner, smuggler and justice of the peace) who made the young O'Connell his heir presumptive.

In 1791, under his uncle's patronage, O'Connell and his younger brother Maurice were sent to continue their schooling in France at the English Jesuit college of Saint-Omer. Revolutionary upheaval and their mob denunciation as "young priests" and "little aristocrats", persuaded them in January 1793 to flee their Benedictine college at Douai. They crossed the English Channel with the brothers John and Henry Sheares who displayed a handkerchief soaked, they claimed, in the blood of Louis XVI, the late executed king. The experience is said to have left O'Connell with a lifelong aversion to mob rule and violence.

=== 1798 and legal practice ===
After further legal studies in London, including a pupillage at Lincoln's Inn, O'Connell returned to Ireland in 1795. The Roman Catholic Relief Act 1793, while maintaining the Oath of Supremacy that excluded Catholics from parliament, the judiciary and the higher offices of state, had granted them the vote on the same limited terms as Protestants and removed most of the remaining barriers to their professional advancement. O'Connell, nonetheless, remained of the opinion that in Ireland the whole policy of the Irish Parliament and the London-appointed Dublin Castle executive, was to repress the people and to maintain the ascendancy of a privileged and corrupt minority.

On 19 May 1798, O'Connell was called to the Irish Bar. Four days later, the United Irishmen staged their ill-fated rebellion. Toward the end of his life, O'Connell claimed, belatedly, to have been a United Irishman. Asked how that could be reconciled with his membership of the government's volunteer Yeomanry (the Lawyers Artillery Corps), he replied that in '98 "the popular party was so completely crushed that the only chance of doing any good for the people was by affecting ultra loyalty." Whatever the case, O'Connell had little faith in the United Irishmen or in their hopes of French intervention. He sat out the rebellion in his native Kerry. When in 1803, Robert Emmet faced execution for attempting to renew the rebellion against what was now a United Kingdom crown and parliament, O'Connell declared that as the cause of so much bloodshed Emmett had forfeited any claim to "compassion".

In the decades that followed, O'Connell practised private law and, although invariably in debt, reputedly had the largest income of any Irish barrister. In court, he sought to prevail by refusing deference, showing no compunction in studying and exploiting a judge's personal and intellectual weaknesses. He was long ranked below less accomplished Queen's Counsels, a status not open to Catholics until late in his career. But when offered he refused the senior judicial position of Master of the Rolls.

=== Family ===
In 1802, O'Connell married his third cousin, Mary O'Connell. He did so in defiance of his benefactor, his uncle Maurice, who believed his nephew should have sought out an heiress. They had four daughters, Ellen (1805–1883), an accomplished poet, Catherine (1808–1891), Elizabeth (1810–1883), and Rickarda (1815–1817) and four sons, Maurice (1803–1853), Morgan (1804–1885), John (1810–1858), and Daniel (1816–1897). In time, each of the boys was to join their father as Members of Parliament. Despite O'Connell's early infidelities, the marriage was happy and Mary's death in 1836 was a blow from which her husband is said never to have recovered.

== Political beliefs ==
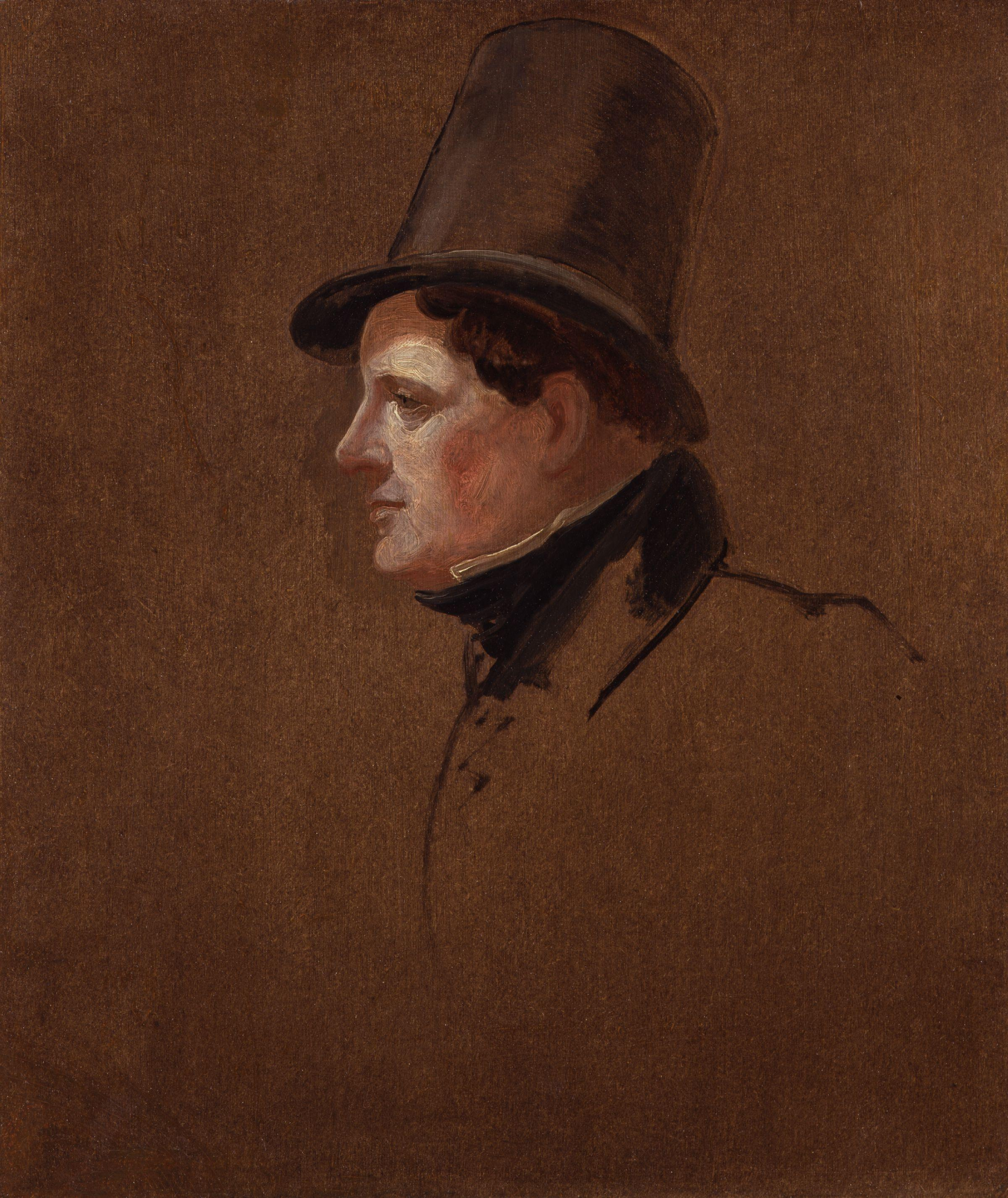
1834 portrait of O'Connell by George Hayter

=== Church and state ===
O'Connell's personal principles reflected the influences of the Enlightenment and of radical and democratic thinkers some of whom he had encountered in London and in masonic lodges. He was greatly influenced by William Godwin's Enquiry Concerning Political Justice (public opinion the root of all power, civil liberty and equality the bedrock of social stability), and was, for a period, converted to Deism by his reading of Thomas Paine's The Age of Reason.

By 1809, he had returned to the Church, "becoming thereafter more devout by the year". Yet in the 1820s, he was still regarded by some as an "English rationalist utilitarian", a "Benthamite". For a time Jeremy Bentham and O'Connell did become personal friends as well as political allies.

At Westminster O'Connell played a major part in the passage of the Reform Act 1832 and in the Slavery Abolition Act 1833 (an international cause in which he continued to campaign). He spoke in defence of the Tolpuddle Martyrs, censured flogging in the army and opposed the death penalty for all but murder. He welcomed the revolutions of 1830 in Belgium and France, and advocated "a complete severance of the Church from the State". Such liberalism (as "thorough", William Ewart Gladstone suggested, as that of an English liberal with "no Ireland to think of") made all the more intolerable to O'Connell the charge that as "Papists" he and his co-religionists could not be trusted with the defence of constitutional liberties.

O'Connell protested that, while "sincerely Catholic", he did not "receive" his politics "from Rome". At the same time, he insisted on the political independence of the Church. In 1808 "friends of emancipation", Henry Grattan among them, proposed that fears of Popery might be allayed if the Crown were accorded the same right exercised by continental monarchs, a veto on the confirmation of Catholic bishops. Even when, in 1814, the Curia itself (then in a silent alliance with Britain against Napoleon) proposed that bishops be "personally acceptable to the king", O'Connell was unyielding in his opposition. Refusing any instruction from Rome as to "the manner of their emancipation", O'Connell declared that Irish Catholics should be content to "remain forever without emancipation" rather than allow the king and his ministers "to interfere" with the Pope's appointment of their senior clergy.

=== Church and nation ===
In his travels in Ireland in 1835, Alexis de Tocqueville remarked on the "unbelievable unity between the Irish clergy and the Catholic population". The people looked to the clergy, and the clergy "rebuffed" by the "upper classes" ("Protestants and enemies"), had "turned all its attention to the lower classes; it has the same instincts, the same interests and the same passions as the people; [a] state of affairs altogether peculiar to Ireland". Such was the unity, O'Connell argued, the bishops would have sacrificed had they agreed to Rome submitting their appointments for Crown approval. Licensed by the government they and their priests would have been as little regarded as the Anglican clergy of the Established Church.

In most districts of the country, the priest was the sole figure, standing independent of the Protestant landlords and magistrates, around whom a national movement could be reliably built. But for O'Connell a weakening of the bond between priests and their people would have represented more than a strategic loss. In "the heat of combat", he would let slip his repeated emphasis on the inclusiveness of the Irish nation to suggest Catholicism itself as the nation's defining loyalty. He declared not only that the Catholic Church in Ireland "is a national Church", but "if the people rally to me they will have a nation for that Church", and indeed that Catholics in Ireland are "the people, emphatically the people" and "a nation". For O'Connell's newspaper, the Pilot, "the distinction created by religion" was the one "positive and unmistakable" mark of separating the Irish from the English.

In 1837, O'Connell clashed with William Smith O'Brien over the Limerick MP's support for granting state payments to Catholic clergy. The Catholic Bishops came out in support of O'Connell's stance, resolving "most energetically to oppose any such arrangement, and that they look upon those that labour to effect it as the worst enemies of the Catholic religion".

=== Disavowal of violence ===
Consistent with the position he had taken publicly in relation to the rebellions of 1798 and 1803, O'Connell focused on parliamentary representation and popular, but peaceful, demonstration to induce change. Disavowing revolutionary violence— "no political change is worth the shedding of a single drop of human blood"— O'Connell styled himself a "Radical Reformer". His critics, however, were to see in his ability to mobilise the Irish masses an intimation of violence. It was a standing theme with O'Connell that if the British establishment did not reform the governance of Ireland, Irishmen would start to listen to the "counsels of violent men".

O'Connell insisted on his loyalty, presenting George IV, on his visit to Ireland in 1821, with a laurel crown on bended knee. In contrast to his later successor Charles Stewart Parnell (although like O'Connell, himself a landlord), O'Connell was also consistent in his defence of property. Yet he was willing to defend those accused of political crimes and of agrarian outrages. In his last notable court appearance, the Doneraile conspiracy trials of 1829, O'Connell saved several tenant Whiteboys from the gallows.

=== Abandonment of the Irish language ===
Irish was O'Connell's mother tongue and that of the vast majority of the rural population. Yet he insisted on addressing his (typically open-air) meetings in English, sending interpreters out among the crowd to translate his words. At a time when "as a cultural or political concept 'Gaelic Ireland' found few advocates", O'Connell declared:

I am sufficiently utilitarian not to regret [the] gradual abandonment [of Irish]... Although the language is associated with many recollections that twine round the hearts of Irishmen, yet the superior utility of the English tongue, as the medium of all modern communication is so great, that I can witness, without a sigh, the gradual disuse of Irish.

O'Connell's "indifference to the fate of the language", a decade before the Famine, was consistent with the policies of the Catholic Church (which under Paul Cardinal Cullen was to develop a mission to the English-speaking world), of the government-funded National Schools and more generally of an emergent Catholic bourgeoisie "determined to find a replacement for the culture of the defeated and rapidly vanishing Gaelic world from which it had sprung". Together, these forces were to combine in the course of the century to accelerate the near-complete conversion to English.

There is no evidence to suggest that O'Connell saw "the preservation or revival or any other aspect of 'native culture' (in the widest sense of the term) as essential to his political demands". On the other hand, it may have been that "O'Connell's anchorage in Gaelic society was so firm and obvious . . . that there was simply no need for him to take up issues of cultural nationalism". As an "Irish chieftain", he attracted an "uniquely large amount" of attention in ballads and the Gaelic oral tradition generally.

== Emancipation and the agrarian crisis ==
=== The "Liberator" ===
Catholic Emancipation as a world upside down: held aloft, Daniel O'Connell promises wigs – symbol of Ascendancy rank and property – for "ye all." (Isaac Cruikshank 1789–1856)

To broaden and intensify the campaign for emancipation, in 1823, O'Connell established the Catholic Association. For a "Catholic rent" of a penny a month (typically paid through the local priest), this, for the first time, drew the labouring poor into a national movement. Their investment enabled O'Connell (derided by his enemies as the "King of Beggars") to mount "monster" rallies (crowds of over 100,000) that stayed in the hands of authorities and emboldened larger enfranchised tenants to vote for pro-Emancipation candidates in defiance of their landlords.

The government moved to suppress the Association by a series of prosecutions but with limited success. Already in 1822 O'Connell had manoeuvred his principal foe, the Attorney General, William Saurin, into actions sufficiently intemperate to ensure his removal by the Lord Lieutenant. His confrontation with Dublin Corporation, equally unbending in its defence of the "Protestant Constitution", took a more tragic turn.

Outraged at O'Connell's refusal to retract his description of the corporation as "beggarly", one of their number challenged O'Connell to a duel. John D'Esterre had thought O'Connell might back down, for he had earlier refused a challenge from an opposing lawyer. The former royal marine was in any case confident of his aim. Recognising that his reputation would never be safe if he again demurred, O'Connell accepted. The duel took place on 2 February 1815 at Bishopscourt, County Kildare. Both men fired. O'Connell, unharmed, mortally wounded D'Esterre. Distressed by the killing, O'Connell offered D'Esterre's widow a pension. She consented to an allowance for her daughter and this O'Connell paid regularly for more than thirty years until his death.

Some months later, O'Connell was engaged to fight a second duel with the Chief Secretary for Ireland (and future Prime Minister), Robert Peel, O'Connell's repeated references to him as "Orange Peel" ("a man good for nothing except to be a champion for Orangeism") being the occasion. Only O'Connell's arrest in London en route to their rendezvous in Ostend prevented the encounter, and the affair went no further. But in 1816, following his return to faithful Catholic observance, O'Connell made "a vow in heaven" never again to put himself in a position where he might shed blood. In "expiation for the death D'Esterre", he is said thereafter to have accepted the insults of men whom he refused to fight "with pride". (Thomas Moore privately proposed that "removing, by his example, that restraint which the responsibility of one to another under the law of duelling imposed", was "one of the worst things, perhaps, O'Connell had done for Ireland", and had given his penchant for personal abuse free rein).

In July 1828, O'Connell defeated a member of the British cabinet in a County Clare by-election. However, he was not permitted to take up his seat in Parliament as he refused to swear the Oath of Supremacy – the requirement that MPs acknowledge the King as "Supreme Governor" of the Church and thus forswear the Roman communion. Peel and the Prime Minister, the Duke of Wellington, recognised in O'Connell "a vast demonstration of populist political organisation, and clerical power" more challenging than a separatist conspiracy. Wellington proposed a new Oath of Allegiance unexceptional to Catholics, and forced the issue by threatening to resign. The Catholic Relief Act became law in April 1829. It was not made retroactive so O'Connell had to stand again for election. He was returned unopposed in July 1829.

Such was O'Connell's prestige as "the Liberator" that George IV reportedly complained that while "Wellington is the King of England", O'Connell was "King of Ireland", and he, himself, merely "the dean of Windsor". Some of O'Connell's younger lieutenants in the new struggle for Repeal – the Young Irelanders – were critical of the leader's acclaim. Michael Doheny noted that the 1829 act had only been the latest in a succession of "relief" measures dating back to the Papists Act 1778. Honour was due rather to those who had "wrung from the reluctant spirit of a far darker time the right of living, of worship, of enjoying property, and exercising the franchise".

=== Tenant Disenfranchisement and the Tithe War ===
Entry to parliament had not come without a price. With Jeremy Bentham, O'Connell had considered allowing George Ensor, a Protestant member of the Catholic Association, to stand as his running mate in the Clare election. But Ensor had objected to what he identified as the "disenfranchisement project" in the relief bill. Receiving its royal assent on the same day, the Parliamentary Elections (Ireland) Act 1829, brought the Irish franchise into line with England's by raising the property threshold in county seats five-fold to ten pounds. This eliminated the middling tenantry (the Irish "forty-shilling freeholders") who had risked much in defying their landlords on O'Connell's behalf in the Clare election, and reduced the overall electorate in the country from 216,000 voters to just 37,000.

Although the £10 threshold was not revisited, electorate was almost trebled three years later by the Irish addendums to the Reform Act of 1832 : the Representation of the People (Ireland) Act and Parliamentary Boundaries (Ireland) Act. But 92,000 it was still less than half of what it had been before Emancipation.

Rationalising the sacrifice of his freeholders, O'Connell wrote privately in March 1829 that the new ten-pound franchise might actually "give more power to Catholics by concentrating it in more reliable and less democratically dangerous hands". The Young Irelander John Mitchel believed that this was the intent: to detach propertied Catholics from the increasingly agitated rural masses. Once in Parliament, however, O'Connell did speak in favour of parliamentary reform, invoking "the great principle of democratic liberty" in support of a broader franchise.

In a pattern that had been intensifying from the 1820s as landlords cleared land to meet the growing livestock demand from England, tenants had been banding together to oppose evictions, and to attack tithe and process servers. De Tocqueville recorded these Whiteboys and Ribbonmen protesting:

The law does nothing for us. We must save ourselves. We have a little land which we need for ourselves and our families to live on, and they drive us out of it. To whom should we address ourselves?... Emancipation has done nothing for us. Mr. O'Connell and the rich Catholics go to Parliament. We die of starvation just the same.

In 1830, discounting evidence that "unfeeling men had given in favour of cultivating sheep and cattle instead of human beings", O'Connell sought repeal of the Sub-Letting Act which facilitated the clearings. In a Letter to the People of Ireland (1833) he also proposed a 20 per cent tax on absentee landlords for poor relief, and the abolition of tithes levied atop rents by the Anglican establishment – "the landlords' Church".

An initially peaceful campaign of non-payment of tithes turned violent in 1831 when the newly founded Irish Constabulary in lieu of payment began to seize property and conduct evictions. Although opposed not only to the use of force but to agrarian combinations in general, O'Connell defended those detained in the so-called Tithe War. For all eleven accused in the death of fourteen constables in the Carrickshock incident, O'Connell helped secure acquittals on the grounds that an impartial trial was impossible. Yet fearful of embarrassing his Whig allies (who had brutally suppressed tithe and poor law protests in England), in 1838 he rejected the call of the Protestant tenant-righter William Sharman Crawford for the complete elimination of the Church of Ireland levy. In its stead, O'Connell accepted the Tithe Commutation Act. This exempted the majority of cultivators – those who held land at will or from year to year – from the charge, while offering those still liable a 25 percent reduction and a forgiveness of arrears. It did not, as feared, lead to a general compensating increase in rents.

== Campaign for repeal of the Union ==
=== The meaning of Repeal ===
O'Connell's call for a repeal of the 1800 Act of Union, and for a restoration of the Kingdom of Ireland under the Constitution of 1782, which he linked (as he had with emancipation) to a multitude of popular grievances, may have been less a considered constitutional proposal than "an invitation to treat".

The legislative independence won by Grattan's Parliament in 1782 had left executive power in the hands of the London-appointed Dublin Castle administration. In declining to stand as a Repeal candidate, Thomas Moore (Ireland's national bard) objected that with a Catholic parliament in Dublin, "which they would be sure to have out and out", this would be an arrangement impossible to sustain. Separation from Great Britain was its "certain consequence", so that Repeal was a practical policy only if (in the spirit of the United Irishmen) Catholics were again "joined by the dissenters" – the Presbyterians of the North.

But for O'Connell, the historian R.F. Foster suggests that "the trick was never to define what the Repeal meant – or did not mean". It was an "emotional claim", an "ideal", with which "to force the British into offering something".

=== "Testing" the Union ===
O'Connell did prepare the ground for the Home Rule compromise, eventually negotiated between Irish-nationalists and British Liberals from the 1880s to 1914. He declared that while he would "never ask for or work" for anything less than an independent legislature, he would accept a "subordinate parliament" as "an instalment". But for the Whig predecessors to Gladstone's Liberals, with whom O'Connell sought accommodation in the 1830s, even an Irish legislature devolved within the United Kingdom was a step too far. While their reform coalition relied on O'Connell and colleagues in the House of Commons, "they were unionists before they were reformers".

Their first response had been a "clumsy attempt to settle him with a high judicial office", and when this failed, in January 1831, Earl Grey's Whig administration sought to convict O'Connell, and several of his associates, on charges of conspiracy, seditious libel and unlawful assembly. In need of Irish support on the Reform Bill,it was not a course they could sustain. In securing a new majority for Lord Melbourne, in 1835 the Whigs were again reliant on an understanding with O'Connell for the support of the "Irish party" – then broadly comprising, not only O'Connell's 39 committed Repealers, but also at least half of their own Irish Members. They had been satisfied, however, that this Lichfield House Compact would see agitation for an Irish parliament (in whatever form) suspended. O'Connell had declared his willingness to "test" the Union:

The people of Ireland are ready to become a portion of the empire, provided they be made so in reality and not in name alone; they are ready to become a kind of West Britons if made so in benefits and in justice, but if not, we are Irishmen again.

Underscoring the qualifying clause – "if not we are Irishmen again" – historian J.C. Beckett proposes that the change was less than it may have appeared. Under the pressure of a choice between "effectual union or no union", O'Connell was seeking to maximise the scope for interim reforms.

In 1837, O'Connell failed to stall the application to Ireland of the new English Poor Law system of Workhouses , the prospect of which, as de Tocqueville found, was broadly dreaded in Ireland.As an alternative to outdoor relief, the Workhouses made it easier for landlords to clear their estates in favour of larger English-export-oriented farms. O'Connell's objection was that the poor-law charge would ruin a great proportion of landowners, further reducing the wage fund and increasing the poverty of the country. That poverty was due not to exorbitant rents (which O'Connell compared to those in England without reference to Irish practice of sub-letting), but to laws – the Penal Laws of the previous century – that had prohibited the Catholic majority from acquiring education and property. The responsibility for its relief was therefore the government's. To defray the cost O'Connell urged, in vain, a tax on absentee rents.

But as regards the general conduct of the Dublin Castle administration under the Whigs, Beckett concludes that "O'Connell had reason to be satisfied, and "the more so as his influence carried great weight in the making of appointments". Reforms opened the police and judiciary to greater Catholic recruitment, and measures were taken to reduce the provocations and influence of the pro-Ascendancy Orange Order.

In 1840 municipal government was reconstructed on the basis of a rate-payer franchise. In 1841, O'Connell became the first Roman Catholic Lord Mayor of Dublin since Terence MacDermott in the reign of James II. In breaking the Protestant monopoly of corporate rights, he was confident that town councils would become a "school for teaching the science of peaceful political agitation". But the measure was less liberal than municipal reform in England, and left the majority of the population to continue under the landlord-controlled Grand Jury system of county government. In view of Thomas Francis Meagher, in return for damping down Repeal agitation, a "corrupt gang of politicians who fawned on O'Connell" were being allowed an extensive system of political patronage. The Irish people were being "purchased back into factious vassalage."

=== Exchange with Disraeli ===
Caricature dating to 1830 referring to the failed vote in Parliament on Jewish emancipation. A stereotypical Jew is attempting to enter the house. Daniel O'Connell encourages him.

In April 1835, O'Connell sparred with Benjamin Disraeli who, while campaigning in an English by-election, had reportedly branded the Irish leader "an incendiary and a traitor". According to the extensive coverage of his response in The Times, having drawn attention to Disraeli's "Jewish origin", in a speech in Dublin O'Connell suggested that the young Peelite had, not only the "perfidy, selfishness, depravity, and want of principle" typical of a would-be Tory MP, but also the qualities of "the impenitent thief on the cross . . . the blasphemous robber".

Notwithstanding that O'Connell had publicly criticised Pope Gregory XVI's treatment of Jews in the Papal States and bragged of Ireland being the "only Christian country ... unsullied by any one act of persecution of the Jews", his comments elicited charges of anti-Jewish slander.

Disraeli demanded "satisfaction". As it was known that O'Connell had forsworn duelling following the death of D'Esterre, the challenge went to his duelling son, and fellow MP, Morgan O'Connell. Morgan, however, declined responsibility for his father's controversial remarks.

The future Conservative Prime Minister did not prevail in his by-election against the incumbent Whig, but the dispute (which Disraeli recounted throughout his career) propelled him for the first time to general public notice.

=== Conflict with the Chartists and trade unions ===
In 1842, all eighteen of O'Connell's parliamentary "tail" at Westminster voted in favour of the Chartist petition which, along with its radical democratic demands, included Repeal. Their leader had declared himself "a decided advocate of universal suffrage" because no one could properly fix "where the line should be drawn" between servitude and liberty. But the Chartists in England, and in their much smaller number in Ireland, were also to accuse O'Connell of being unreliable and opportunistic in his drive to secure Whig favour.

When in 1831 workers in the Dublin trades created their own political association, O'Connell moved to pack it. The Trades Political Union (TPU) was swamped by 5,000 mostly middle-class repealers who by acclaim carried O'Connell's resolution calling for the suppression of all secret and illegal combinations, particularly those "manifested among the labouring classes". When in 1841 the Chartists held the first meeting of the Irish Universal Suffrage Association (IUSA), a TPU mob broke it up, and O'Connell denounced the association's secretary, Peter Brophy as an Orangeman. From England, where the Irish-born leader of Chartism Fergus O'Connor had joined the IUSA in solidarity, Brophy denounced O'Connell in turn as the "enemy of the unrepresented classes".

Ostensibly, O'Connell's objection to labour and Chartist agitation was the resort to intimidation and violence. But his flexibility with regard to principle alienated not only working-class militants but also middle-class reformers. There was also consternation when, in 1836 O'Connell voted for an amending bill that would have excluded 12-year-olds from the protection of shorter hours under the Factories Regulation Act. While it is clear that O'Connell's only purpose was to delay the return of a Tory ministry (in 1832 and 1833 he had intervened four times to raise the age, and was to do so again in 1839), his reputation suffered.

Karl Marx was of the view that O'Connell "always incited the Irish against the Chartists", and did so "because they too had inscribed Repeal on their banner". To O'Connell, he ascribed the fear that, drawing together national and democratic demands, the Chartist influence might induce his following to break "the established habit of electing place-hunting lawyers" and of seeking "to impress English Liberals".

=== The renewal of the campaign ===
In April 1840, when it became clear that the Whigs would lose office, O'Connell relaunched the Repeal Association, and published a series of addresses criticising government policy and attacking the Union.

The "people", the great numbers of tenant farmers, small-town traders and journeymen, whom O'Connell had rallied to the cause of Emancipation, did not similarly respond to his lead on the more abstract proposition of Repeal; neither did the Catholic gentry or middle classes. Many appeared content to explore the avenues for advancement emancipation had opened. The suspicion, in any case, was that O'Connell's purpose in returning to the constitutional question was merely to disconcert the incoming Conservatives (under his old enemy Sir Robert Peel) and to hasten the Whigs return (entirely the view of Friedrich Engels: the only purpose of Repeal for the "old fox" was to "embarrass the Tory Ministers" and to put his friends back into office).

Meanwhile, as a body, Protestants remained opposed to a restoration of a parliament the prerogatives of which they had once championed. The Presbyterians in the north were persuaded that the Union was both the occasion for their relative prosperity and a guarantee of their liberty.

In the June–July 1841 Westminster elections, Repeal candidates lost half their seats. In a contest marked by the boycott of Guinness as "Protestant porter", O'Connell's son John, a brewer of O'Connell's Ale, failed to hold his father's Dublin seat.

The "Repeal election" 1841 (Source: 1841 United Kingdom general election--Ireland)

Party	Candidates	Unopposed	Seats	Seats change	Votes	%	% change
Whig	55	30	42		17,128	35.1	
Irish Conservative	59	27	41		19,664	40.1	
Repeal	22	12	20		12,537	24.8	
Total	136	69	103		49,329	100	

Population of Ireland, 1841 census: 8.18 million.

Against a background of growing economic distress, O'Connell was nonetheless buoyed by Archbishop John McHale's endorsement of legislative independence. Opinion among all classes was also influenced from October 1842 by Gavan Duffy's new weekly The Nation. Read in Repeal Reading Rooms and passed from hand to hand, its mix of vigorous editorials, historical articles and verse, may have reached as many as a quarter of a million readers.

Breaking out of the very narrow basis for electoral politics (the vote was not restored to the forty-shilling freeholder until 1885), O'Connell initiated a new series of "monster meetings". These were damaging to the prestige of the government, not only at home but abroad. O'Connell was becoming a figure of international renown, with large and sympathetic audiences in the United States, France and Germany. The Conservative government of Robert Peel considered repression, but hesitated, unwilling to tackle the Anti-Corn Law League which was copying O'Connell's methods in England.

=== Northern opposition ===
The Repealer Repulsed, Belfast 1841

Conscious of their minority position in Ulster, Catholic support for O'Connell in the north was "muted". William Crolly, Bishop of Down and Connor and later Archbishop of Armagh, was ambivalent, anxious lest clerical support for Repeal disrupt his "carefully nurtured relationship with Belfast's liberal Presbyterians".

O'Connell "treasured his few Protestant Repealers". But to many of his contemporaries, he appeared "ignorant" of the Protestant (largely Presbyterian) majority society of the north-east, Ulster, counties. Here there was already premonition of future Partition. While protesting that its readers wished only to preserve the Union, in 1843 Belfast's leading paper, the Northern Whig, proposed that if differences in "race" and "interests" argue for Ireland's separation from Great Britain then "the Northern 'aliens', holders of 'foreign heresies' (as O'Connell says they are)" should have their own "distinct kingdom", Belfast as its capital.

O'Connell seemed implicitly to concede the separateness of the Protestant North. He spoke of "invading" Ulster to rescue "our Persecuted Brethren in the North". In the event, and in the face of the hostile crowds that disrupted his one foray to Belfast in 1841 ("the Repealer repulsed!"), he "tended to leave Ulster strictly alone". The northern Dissenters were not redeemed, in his view, by their record as United Irishmen. "The Presbyterians", he remarked, "fought badly at Ballynahinch ... and as soon as the fellows were checked they became furious Orangemen".

Perhaps persuaded by their presence through much of the south as but a thin layer of officials, landowners and their agents, O'Connell proposed that Protestants did not have the staying power of true "religionists". Their ecclesiastical dissent (and not alone their unionism) was a function, he argued, of political privilege. To Dr Paul Cullen (the future Cardinal and Catholic Primate of Ireland) in Rome, O'Connell wrote:

The Protestants of Ireland... are political Protestants, that is, Protestants by reason of their participation in political power... If the Union were repealed and the exclusive system abolished, the great mass of the Protestant community would with little delay melt into the overwhelming majority of the Irish nation. Protestantism would not survive the Repeal ten years.

=== Tara and Clontarf 1843 ===
Punch, August. 26, 1843. Irish peasants pay homage to their "King" on the Hill of Tara. O'Connell enthroned upon the devil, with his foot on the British Constitution.

At the Hill of Tara (by tradition the inaugural seat of the High Kings of Ireland), on the feast-day of the Assumption, 15 August 1843, O'Connell gathered a crowd estimated, in the hostile reporting of The Times, as close to one million, out of the about 8 million people in Ireland. It took O'Connell's carriage two hours to proceed through the throng, accompanied by a harpist playing Thomas Moore's "The Harp that once through Tara's Halls".

O'Connell planned to close the campaign on 8 October 1843 with an even larger demonstration at Clontarf, on the outskirts of Dublin. As the site of Brian Boru's famous victory over the Danes in 1014, it resonated with O'Connell's increasingly militant rhetoric: "the time is coming", he had been telling his supporters, when "you may have the alternative to live as slaves or to die as freemen". Beckett suggests "O'Connell mistook the temper of the government", never expecting that "his defiance would be put to the test". When it was – when troops occupied Clontarf – O'Connell submitted at once. He cancelled the rally and sent out messengers to turn back the approaching crowds.

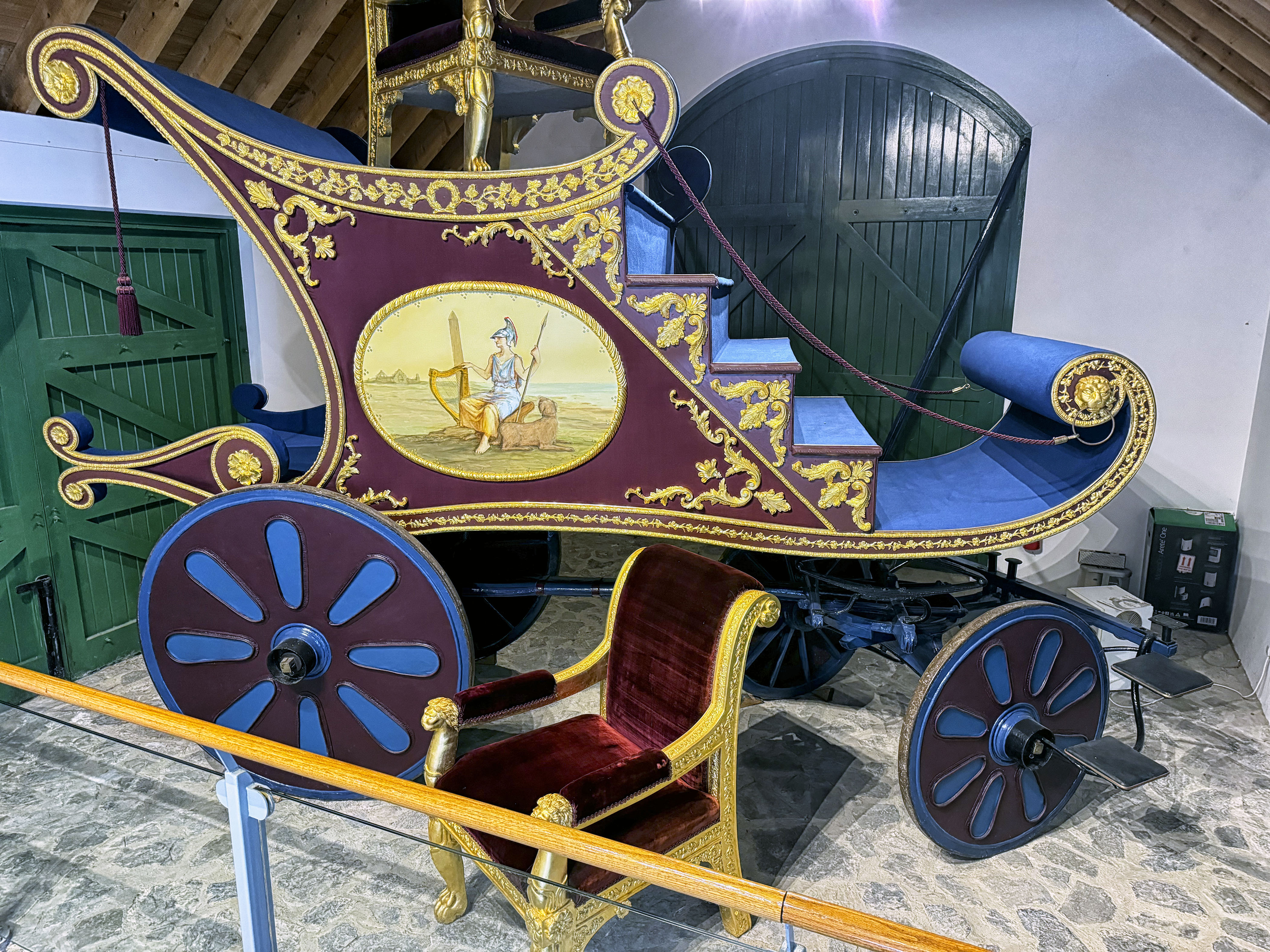
O'Connell's "chariot", now on display in Derrynane House

O'Connell was applauded by the Church, his more moderate supporters and English sympathisers. But many of the movement rank and file who had been fired up by his defiant rhetoric were disillusioned. His loss of prestige might have been greater had the government not prosecuted O'Connell and his son John for conspiracy. Hailed as martyr, O'Connell was imprisoned at the Richmond Bridewell.

When released after three months, the charges quashed on appeal to the House of Lords, O'Connell was paraded in triumph through Dublin on a gilded chariot. But, approaching seventy years of age, O'Connell never fully recovered his former stature or confidence. Having deprived himself of his most potent weapon, the monster meeting, and with his health failing, O'Connell had no plan and the ranks of the Repeal Association began to divide.

== The Famine and the break with Young Ireland ==
=== The Queen's Colleges controversy ===
In 1845, Dublin Castle proposed to educate Catholics and Protestants together in a non-denominational system of higher education. In advance of some of the Catholic bishops (Archbishop Daniel Murray of Dublin favoured the proposal), O'Connell condemned the "godless colleges". (Led by Archbishop McHale, the bishops issued a formal condemnation of the proposed colleges as dangerous to faith and morals in 1850). The principle at stake, of what in Ireland was understood as "mixed education", may already have been lost. When in 1830 the government proposed to educate Catholics and Protestants together at the primary level, it had been the Presbyterians (led by O'Connell's northern nemesis, the evangelist Henry Cooke) who had scented danger. They refused to cooperate in National Schools unless they had the majority to ensure there would be no "mutilating of scripture." But the vehemence of O'Connell's opposition to the colleges, was a cause of dismay among those O'Connell had begun to call Young Irelanders – a reference to Giuseppe Mazzini's anti-clerical and insurrectionist Young Italy.

When the Nation's assistant editor (and promoter of Irish in print), Thomas Davis, a Protestant, objected that "reasons for separate education are reasons for [a] separate life". O'Connell declared himself content to take a stand "for Old Ireland", and accused Davis of suggesting it was a "crime to be a Catholic".

=== Whigs and the Famine ===
Grouped around The Nation, which had proposed as its "first great object" a "nationality" that would embrace as easily "the stranger who is within our gates" as "the Irishman of a hundred generations," the dissidents suspected that in opposing the Queen's Colleges Bill O'Connell was also playing Westminster politics. O'Connell, who by September 1843 was again hinting at the possibility of a renewed alliance with the Whigs, welcomed the opportunity to inflict a defeat on the Peel ministry and to hasten the return of his English "friends" to office.

The Young Irelanders' dismay only increased when at the end of June 1846 O'Connell appeared to succeed in this design. The new ministry of Lord John Russell deployed the Whigs' new laissez-faire ("political economy") doctrines to dismantle the previous government's limited efforts to address the distress of the emerging, and catastrophic, Irish Famine. Charles Edward Trevelyan, who as Assistant Secretary to the Treasury became "virtually dictator of relief for Ireland" put a stop to the government's import and distribution of food with exception only for far western districts (O'Connell's home county Kerry included), where dependence on the failed potato crop was such that there was scarcely trade in any other description of food.

In February 1847 O'Connell stood for the last time before the House of Commons in London and pleaded for his country: "She is in your hands – in your power. If you do not save her, she cannot save herself. One-fourth of her population will perish unless Parliament comes to their relief". As "temporary relief for destitute persons", the government opened soup kitchens. They were closed a few months later in August of the same year. The starving were directed to abandon the land and apply to the workhouses.

=== Peace Resolutions ===
After Thomas Davis's death in 1845, Gavan Duffy offered the post of assistant editor on The Nation to John Mitchel. Mitchel brought a more militant tone. When the conservative Standard observed that the new Irish railways could be used to transport troops to quickly curb agrarian unrest, Mitchel replied combatively that railway tracks could be turned into pikes and that trains could be easily ambushed. O'Connell publicly distanced himself from The Nation setting Duffy up as editor for the prosecution that followed. When the courts absolved him, O'Connell pressed the issue.

In 1847 the Repeal Association tabled resolutions declaring that under no circumstances was a nation justified in asserting its liberties by force of arms. The Young Irelanders had not advocated physical force, but in response to the "Peace Resolutions" Meagher argued that if Repeal could not be carried by moral persuasion and peaceful means, a resort to arms would be a no less honourable course. O'Connell's son John forced the decision: the resolution was carried on the threat of the O'Connells themselves quitting the Association.

Meagher, Davis and other prominent dissidents, among them Gavan Duffy; Jane Wilde; Margaret Callan; William Smith O'Brien; and John Blake Dillon, withdrew and formed themselves as the Irish Confederation.

In the desperate circumstances of the Famine and in the face of martial-law measures that a number of Repeal Association MPs had approved in Westminster, Meagher and some Confederates did take what he had described as the "honourable" course. Their rural rising broke up after a single skirmish, the Battle of Ballingarry.

Some of the "Men of 1848" carried the commitment to physical force forward into the Irish Republican Brotherhood (IRB) – Fenianism. Others followed Gavan Duffy in focussing on what they believed was a basis for a non-sectarian national movement, the struggle for tenant right.

In what Duffy hailed as a "League of North and South" in 1852 tenant protection societies helped return 50 MPs. The seeming triumph over "O'Connellism", however, was short-lived. In the South Archbishop Cullen approved the Catholic MPs breaking their pledge of independent opposition and accepting government positions. In the North William Sharman Crawford and other League candidates had their meetings broken up by Orange "bludgeon men".

== Opposition to slavery in the United States ==
Frederick Douglass, 1840s

O'Connell championed the "civil and religious liberties" of people throughout the world including those of peasants in India (subject, under the East India Company, to "a system of monstrous and perfect oppression"), Maoris in New Zealand, Aboriginal people in Australia, patriotes in Lower Canada, and Jews in Europe. It was, however, his unbending abolitionism, and in particular, his opposition to slavery in the United States, that demonstrated commitments that transcended Catholic and national interests in Ireland.

The anti-slavery cause may have served O'Connell as "a useful metaphor to work his own domestic agenda" (he claimed that "the cry of the West Indian negro brought the Irish howl to his ear"). But he pursued it at a cost. For his Repeal campaign, O'Connell relied heavily on money from the United States, yet he insisted that none should be accepted from those engaged in slavery (a ban extended from 1843 to all those emigrants to the American South who in daring to "countenance the system of slavery" he could "recognise as Irish no longer"). In 1829 he had told a large abolitionist meeting in London that "of all men living, an American citizen, who is the owner of slaves, is the most despicable". In the same Emancipation year, addressing the Cork Anti-Slavery Society, he declared that, much as he longed to go to America, so long as it was "tarnished by slavery", he would never "pollute" his foot "by treading on its shores".

In 1838, in a call for a new crusade against "the vile union" in the United States "of republicanism and slavery", O'Connell denounced the hypocrisy of George Washington and characterised the American ambassador, the Virginian Andrew Stevenson, as a "slave-breeder". When Stevenson challenged O'Connell to a duel, a sensation was created in the United States. On the floor of the House of Representatives the former U.S. president, John Quincy Adams spoke of a "conspiracy against the life of Daniel O'Connell".

In both Ireland and America, the furore exasperated supporters. Young Irelanders took issue. Gavan Duffy believed the time was not right "for gratuitous interference in American affairs". This was a common view. Attacks on slavery in the United States were considered "wanton and intolerable provocation". In 1845 John Blake Dillon reported to Thomas Davis "everybody was indignant at O'Connell meddling in the business": "Such talk" was "supremely disgusting to the Americans, and to every man of honour and spirit". Mitchel took this dissent a step further: to Duffy's disgust, Mitchel positively applauded black slavery. In the United States, fearful that it would further inflame anti-Irish nativist sentiment, Bishop John Hughes of New York urged Irish Americans not to sign O'Connell's abolitionist petition ("An Address of the People of Ireland to their Countrymen and Countrywomen in America").

O'Connell was entirely undaunted: crowds gathered to hear him on Repeal were regularly treated to excursions on the evils of human traffic and bondage. When in 1845, Frederick Douglass, touring Britain and Ireland following the publication of his Life of an American Slave, attended unannounced a meeting in Conciliation Hall, Dublin, he heard O'Connell explain to a roused audience:

I have been assailed for attacking the American institution, as it is called, – Negro slavery. I am not ashamed of that attack. I do not shrink from it. I am the advocate of civil and religious liberty, all over the globe, and wherever tyranny exists, I am the foe of the tyrant; wherever oppression shows itself, I am the foe of the oppressor; wherever slavery rears its head, I am the enemy of the system, or the institution, call it by what name you will. I am the friend of liberty in every clime, class and colour. My sympathy with distress is not confined within the narrow bounds of my own green island. No – it extends itself to every corner of the earth. My heart walks abroad, and wherever the miserable are to be succored, or the slave to be set free, there my spirit is at home, and I delight to dwell.

The black abolitionist, Charles Lenox Remond said that it was only on hearing O'Connell speak in London (the first international Anti-Slavery Convention, 1840) that he realised what being an abolitionist really meant: "every fibre of my heart contracted [when I] listened to the scorching rebukes of the fearless O'Connell". In the United States William Lloyd Garrison published a selection of O'Connell's anti-slavery speeches, no man having "spoken so strongly against the soul-drivers of this land as O'Connell". In the 1846, Margaret Fuller compared O'Connell in The Liberty Bell to the biblical Daniel, able "to brave the fiery furnace, and the lion's den, and the silken lures of a court, and speak always with a poet's power."

It was as an abolitionist that O'Connell was honoured by his favourite author, Charles Dickens. In Martin Chuzzlewit, O'Connell is the "certain Public Man", revealed as an abolitionist, whom otherwise enthusiastic friends of Ireland (the "Sons of Freedom") in the United States decide they would have "pistolled, stabbed – in some way slain".

== Death, legacy and commemoration ==
Following his last appearance in parliament, and describing himself "oppressed with grief", his "physical power departed", O'Connell travelled on a pilgrimage to Rome. He died, age 71, in May 1847 in Genoa, Italy of a softening of the brain (Encephalomalacia). In accord with his last wishes, O'Connell's heart was buried in Rome (at Sant'Agata dei Goti, then the chapel of the Irish College), and the remainder of his body in Glasnevin Cemetery in Dublin. His sons are buried in his crypt.

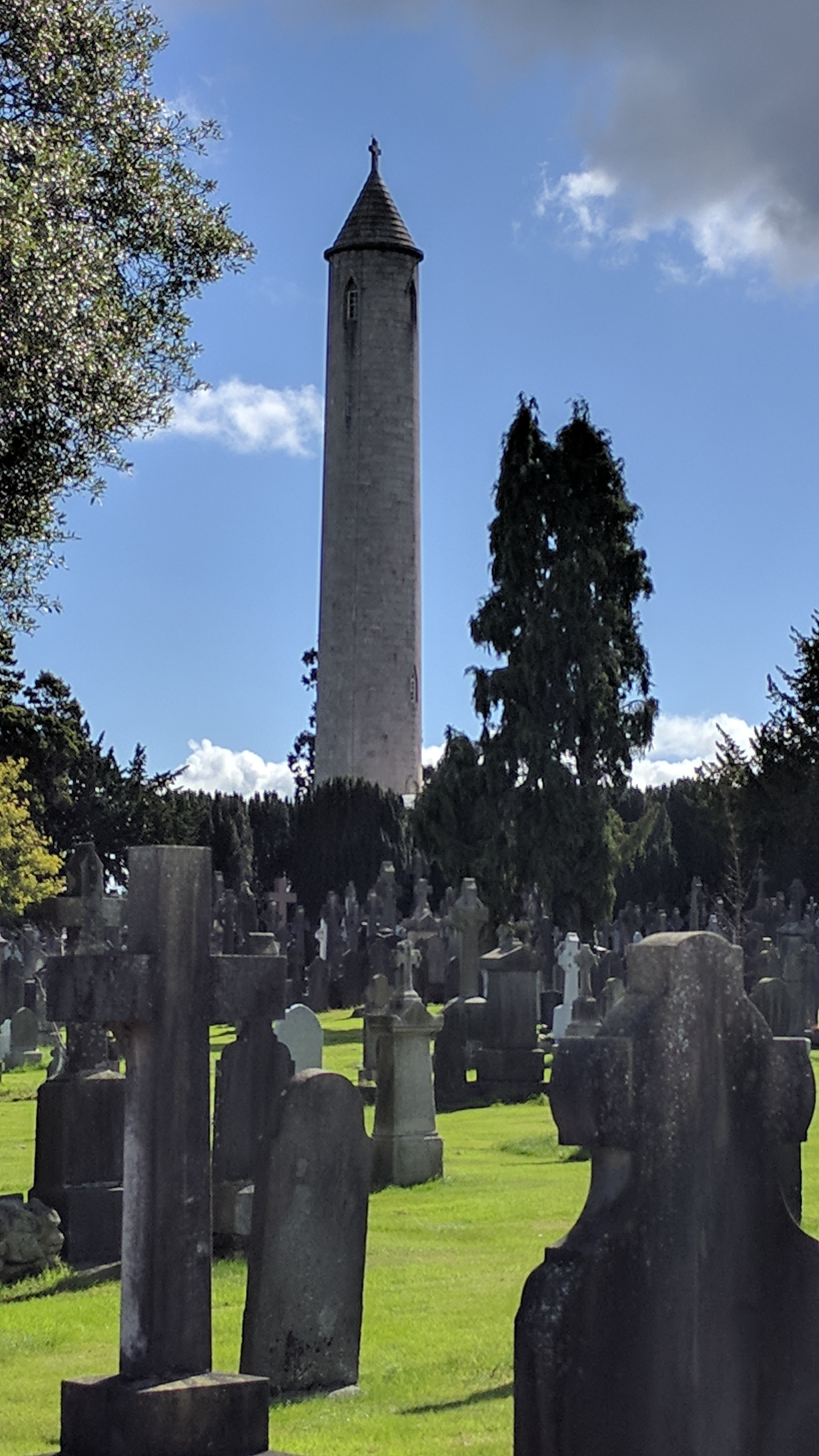
The memorial round tower built at Glasnevin cemetery to honour O'Connell

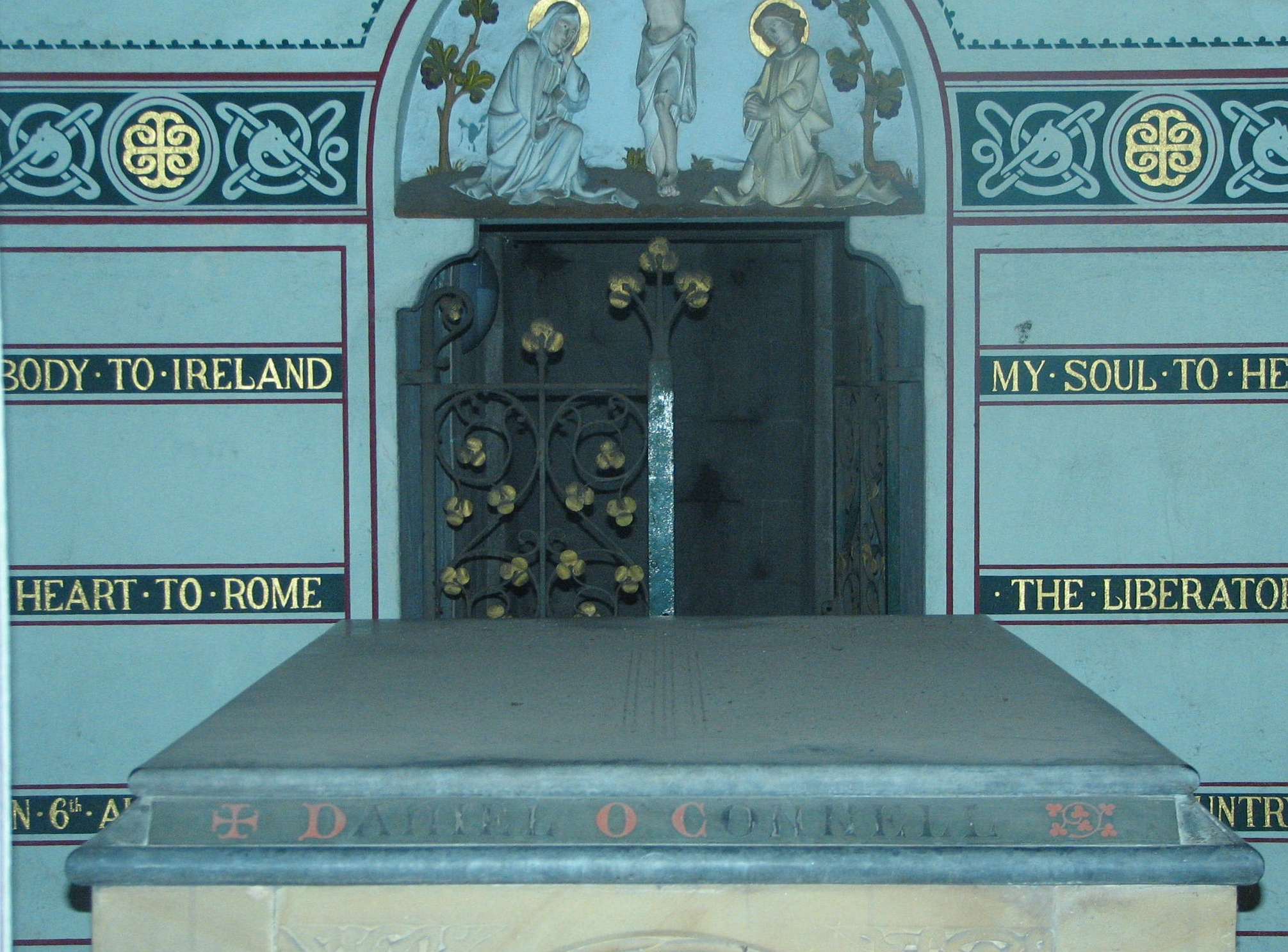
The tomb of Daniel O'Connell in the crypt of the tower

=== Lack of a successor ===
In leading the charge against the Young Irelanders within the Repeal Association, John O'Connell had vied for the succession. But Gavan Duffy records that the Liberator's death left no one with "acknowledged weight of character, or solidity of judgement" to lead the diminished movement out beyond the Famine. Such, he suggests, was the "inevitable penalty of the statesman or leader who prefers courtiers and lackeys to counsellors and peers".

In June 1848, "bankrupt and policy-less", the Repeal Association was dissolved. Caught up in "the scramble for places and patronage, its MPs had failed to rally against a succession of Irish coercion bills. Retiring from Parliament, John O'Connell eventually accepted a sinecure position himself: "Clerk of the Crown and Hanaper" at Dublin Castle.

=== Reputation as a landlord ===
An article appearing in The Times on Christmas Day, 1845, created an international scandal by accusing O'Connell of being one of the worst landlords in Ireland. His tenants were pictured as "living in abject poverty and neglect". The Irish press, however, was quick to observe that this was a description of famine conditions and to dismiss the report as a politically motivated attack.

To manage his property O'Connell employed a kinsman, John Primrose, who had a reputation as a strict agent. But when cholera struck the Kerry coast in 1832, he instructed Primrose to "be prodigal of relief out of my means--beef, bread, mutton, medicines, physician, everything you can think of". When the Great Famine hit in 1845, he wished his son Maurice "to be as abundant to the people as you can", and was so intent on securing relief that he sought to buy the government food depot in Cahersiveen, an offer refused from the Treasury by Trevelyan.

=== Eulogies and interpretation ===
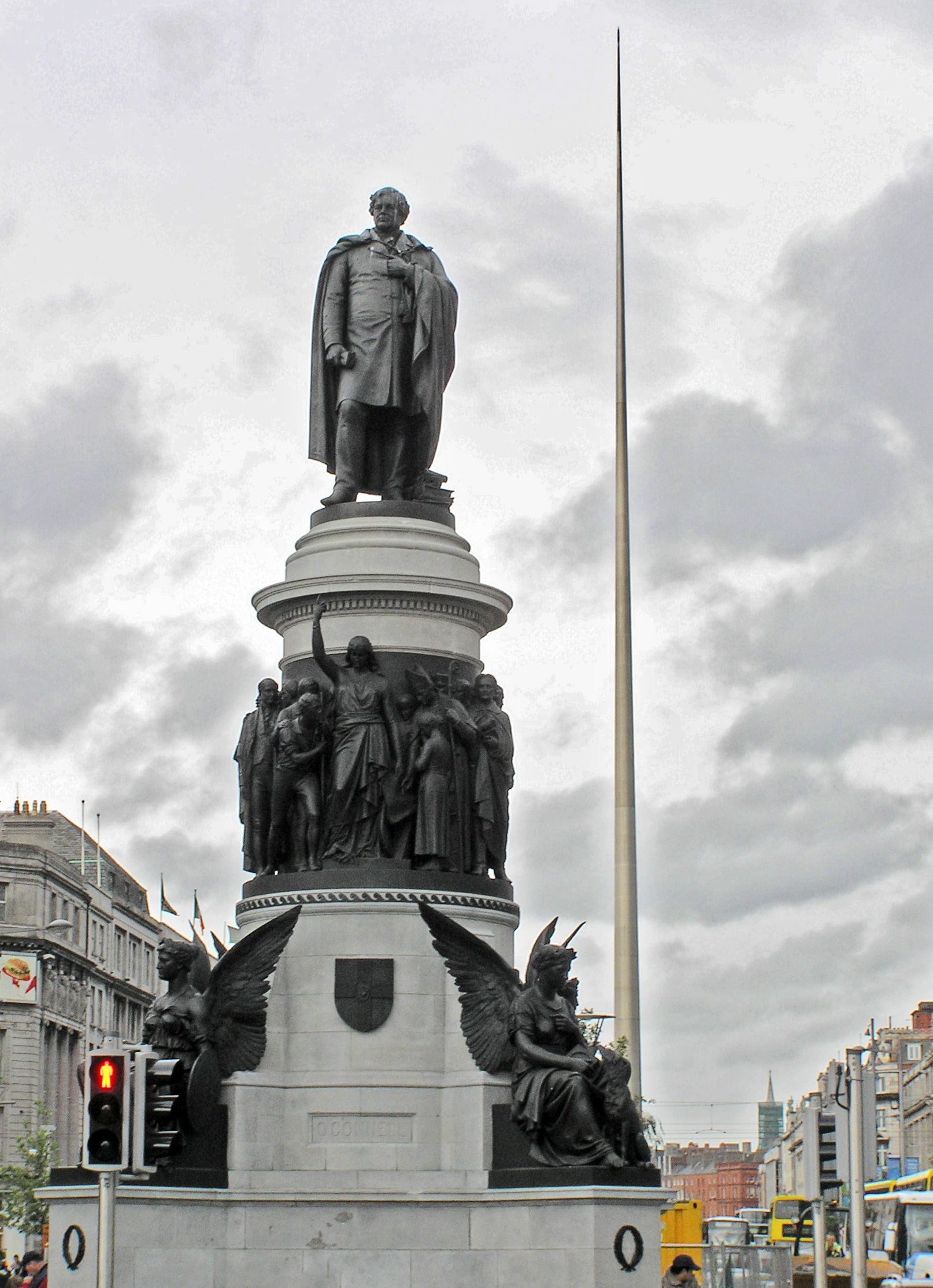
O'Connell Monument on O'Connell Street in Dublin

Calling O'Connell an "incarnation of a people", Honoré de Balzac noted that for twenty years his name had filled the press of Europe as no man since Napoleon. Gladstone, an eventual convert to Irish Home Rule, described him as "the greatest popular leader the world has ever seen".

O'Connell had his imitators. In the German states (where he counted Goethe and Ludwig I of Bavaria among his admirers), O'Connell became a "folk hero" among Catholics (his portrait hanging in many homes and taverns), particularly in the Rhineland where the Catholic majority resented their union with Lutheran Prussia. Beginning in 1848, his Catholic Association served as a model for the mass-membership Katholischer Verein Deutschland.

In France, Flora Tristan, mocked as "O'Connell in petticoats", imitated the Liberator's rhetorical flourishes and his policy of nominal subscriptions in support of a very different emancipatory project, her Chartist-inspired vision of a single "Workers' Union".

Frederick Douglass said of O'Connell that his voice was "enough to calm the most violent passion, even though it were already manifesting itself in a mob. There is a sweet persuasiveness in it, beyond any voice I ever heard. His power over an audience is perfect."

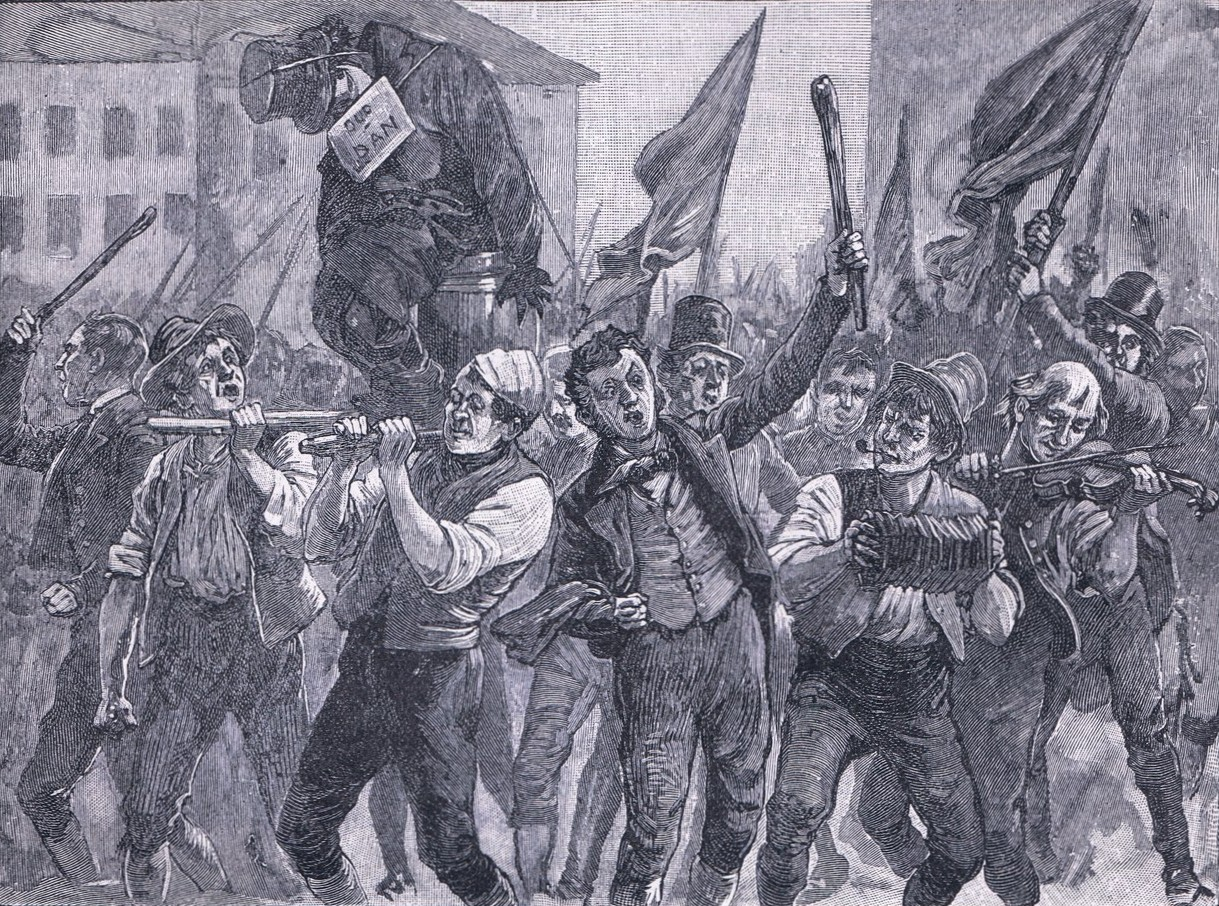
Protestant demonstrators burning an effigy of Daniel O'Connell, an incident that sparked the Belfast riots of 1864

O'Connell's oratory is a quality to which James Joyce (a distant relative) plays tribute in Ulysses: "a people", he wrote, "sheltered within his voice." Other Irish literary figures of the independence generation were critical. W. B. Yeats found O'Connell "too compromised and compromising" and his rhetoric "bragging". Seán Ó Faoláin sympathised with the Young Irelanders but allowed that if the nation O'Connell helped call forth and "define" was Catholic and without the Protestant north it was because O'Connell was "the greatest of all Irish realists".

In 1922, following the creation of the Irish Free State, O'Connell was honoured in the renaming of Sackville Street, Dublin's broadest thoroughfare. Yet the chairman of the new government (until his assassination later that same year), Michael Collins, was damning in his assessment. O'Connell had been "a follower and not a leader of the people". Urged on by "the zeal of the people, stirred for the moment to national consciousness by the teaching of Davis, he talked of national liberty, but he did nothing to win it". O'Connell's aim had never risen above establishing the Irish people as "a free Catholic community". Those who declared their continued fealty to the Republic that had been proclaimed in 1916 on what was now O'Connell Street, dismissed his legacy in similar terms.

In 2025, objecting to renaming Castleisland's main street after Daniel O'Connell, historian Time Horgan laid a list charges against his fellow Kerryman, including abandoning the 40-shilling freeholder and driving a "wedge" between Presbyterians in Ulster and Catholics". But the predominant interpretation of O'Connell remains that of the liberal Catholic and political pragmatist, portrayed in Oliver MacDonagh's 1988 biography. This builds on the view of the historian Michael Tierney who proposes O'Connell as a "forerunner" of a European Christian Democracy. At the same time, his more recent biographer Patrick Geoghegan seeks to return O'Connell to the national story. Echoing a reassessment that was offered by Eamon De Valera, he has O'Connell forging "a new Irish nation in the fires of his own idealism, intolerance and determination" and becoming for a people "broken, humiliated and defeated" its "chieftain".

=== Memorials ===
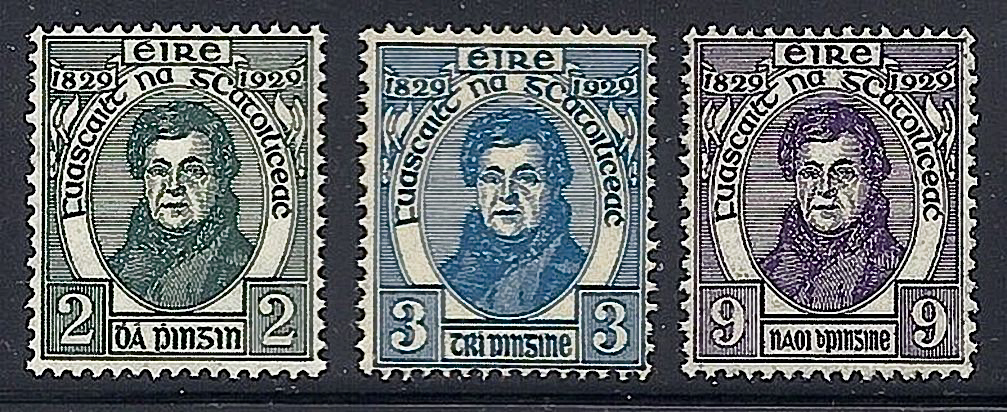
Set of O'Connell commemorative postage stamps, 1929

In 1855, O'Connell's plot at Glasnevin Cemetery was marked with a 55m-high Irish Round Tower. Shut in 1971 when damaged by a loyalist bomb (retaliation for the IRA's destruction of Nelson's Pillar in O'Connell Street), the tower was re-opened in 2018.

His statue (the work of John Henry Foley) was erected in 1882 at the bottom of Sackville Street, renamed O'Connell Street in 1922. O'Connell Streets also exist in Athlone, Clonmel, Dungarvan, Ennis, Kilkee, Limerick,

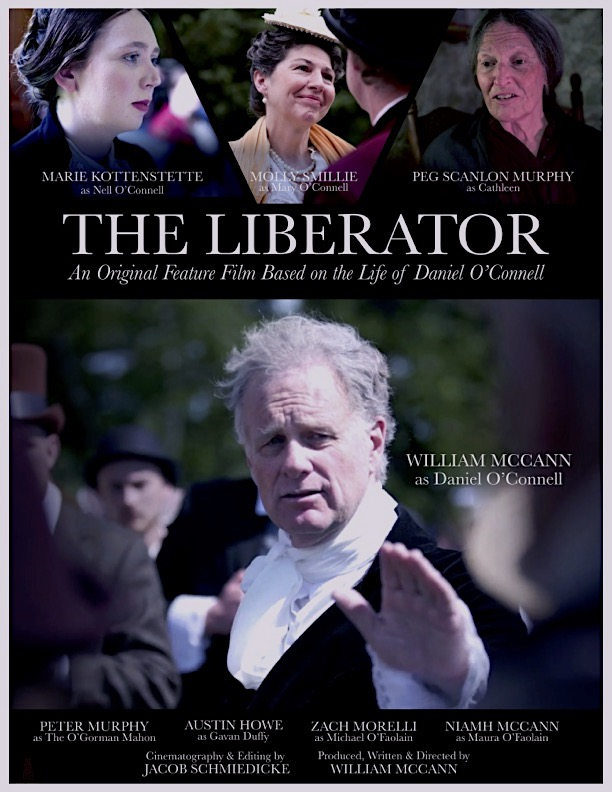
Poster for The Liberator 2022

Sligo, and Waterford. A Daniel O'Connell Bridge, opened in 1880, spans the Manuherikia River at Ophir in New Zealand.

A set of Irish postage stamps depicting O'Connell and valued at two, three, and nine pence was issued on 22 June 1929 to commemorate the centenary of Catholic Emancipation.

There is a statue of O'Connell outside St Patrick's Cathedral in Melbourne, Australia. Derrynane House, O'Connell's home in Kerry, has been converted into a museum honouring the Liberator.

On Friday, 12 September 2025, the Central Bank of Ireland issued a commemorative coin in both gold (€50) and silver (€15) commemorating the 250th anniversary of the birth of Daniel O'Connell.

=== Film ===
O'Connell's life was the subject of a 2022 feature film produced by Red Abbey Productions titled The Liberator.

== Biographies ==
- Geoghegan, Patrick (2008). King Dan: the Rise of Daniel O'Connell, 1775–1829. Dublin: Gill & Macmillan.
- Geoghegan, Patrick (2010). Liberator Daniel O'Connell: The Life and Death of Daniel O'Connell, 1830–1847. Dublin: Gill & Macmillan.
- Gwynn, Denis (1929). Daniel O'Connell, the Irish Liberator. Dublin: Hutchinson & Company. ISBN 9780598826008. Archived from the original on 19 August 2021.
- Lecky, W. E. H. (1912). Leaders of Public Opinion in Ireland, Vol II, Daniel O'Connell. Longman, Green & Co.
- Luby, Thomas Clarke (1880). Life and Times of Daniel O'Connell. Dublin: Cameron & Ferguson.
- Macken, Ultan (2008). The Story of Daniel O'Connell. Dublin: Mercier Press.
- MacDonagh, Oliver (1991). O'Connell: The Life of Daniel O'Connell 1775–1847. London: Weidenfeld & Nicolson.
- MacIntyre, Angus (1965), The Liberator: Daniel O'Connell and the Irish Party 1830-1947. London: Hamish Hamilton.
- O'Connell, Maurice R., ed. (1972–1980). The Correspondence of Daniel O'Connell. Dublin: Irish Manuscripts Commission. 8 vols: Vol. I. 1792–1814 Vol. II. 1815–1823 Vol. III. 1824–1828 Vol. IV. 1829–1832 Vol. V. 1833–1836 Vol. VI. 1837–1840 Vol. VII. 1841–1845 Vol. VIII. 1846–1847
- Ó Faoláin, Seán (1938). King of the Beggars: A Life of Daniel O'Connell. London: Thomas Nelson & Sons.
- O'Ferrall, Fergus (1991). Daniel O'Connell. Gill's Irish Lives Series. Dublin: Gill & Macmillan.
- Trench, Charles Chenevix (1984). The Great Dan. London: Jonathan Cape.
- Tierney, Michael, ed. (1949). Daniel O'Connell: Nine Centenary Essays. Dublin: Browne and Nolan.

Parliament of the United Kingdom
Preceded by William Vesey-FitzGerald; Lucius O'Brien	Member of Parliament for County Clare; 1828–1830; With: Lucius O'Brien	Succeeded by William Nugent Macnamara; James Patrick Mahon
Preceded by Richard Power; Lord George Beresford	Member of Parliament for County Waterford; 1830–1831; With: Lord George Beresford	Succeeded by Sir Richard Musgrave, Bt; Robert Power
Preceded by Maurice Fitzgerald; William Browne	Member of Parliament for County Kerry; 1831–1832; With: Frederick Mullins	Succeeded by Frederick Mullins; Charles O'Connell
Preceded by Sir Frederick Shaw, Bt; Viscount Ingestre	Member of Parliament for Dublin City; 1832–1835; With: Edward Southwell Ruthven	Succeeded by George Alexander Hamilton; John Beattie West
Preceded by Richard Sullivan	Member of Parliament for Kilkenny City; 1836–1837	Succeeded by Joseph Hume
Preceded by George Alexander Hamilton; John Beattie West	Member of Parliament for Dublin City; 1837–1841; With: Robert Hutton	Succeeded by John Beattie West; Edward Grogan
Preceded by Garrett Standish Barry; Edmund Burke Roche	Member of Parliament for County Cork; 1841–1847; With: Edmund Burke Roche	Succeeded by Maurice Power; Edmund Burke Roche
Civic offices
Preceded by Sir John Kingston James	Lord Mayor of Dublin; 1841–1842	Succeeded by George Roe
