= Staigue stone fort =

Stone ringfort in Ireland

Coordinates: 51°48′19″N 10°00′57″W

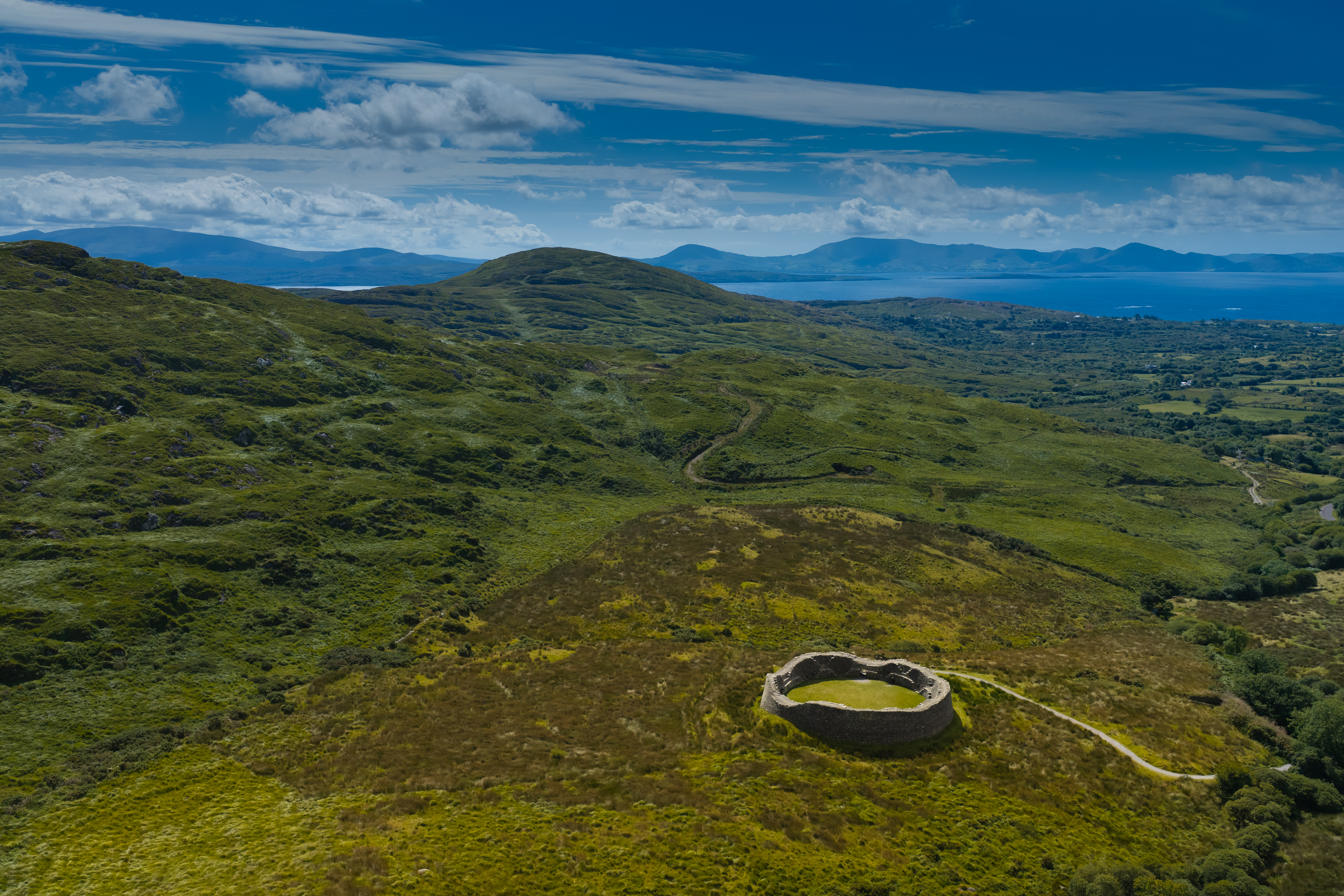
Staigue Fort

Staigue or Staig (Irish: an Stéig or Caiseal Stéig) is a ruined stone ringfort eighteen kilometres west of Sneem, on the Iveragh peninsula in County Kerry, Ireland. The fort is thought to have been built during the late Iron Age, probably 100 BC, as a defensive stronghold for a local lord or king.

It is at the head of a valley opening south to the sea, surrounded by a ditch over 8m wide and at present 1.8m deep. The fort's walls are up to 5.5 m (18 ft) high in places, 4 m (13 ft) thick at the bottom and 27.4 m (90 ft) in diameter. The inside is reached through a 1.8m passage roofed with massive double lintels. Staigue represents a considerable feat in engineering and building. It was built without mortar, using undressed stones of local sandstone. Vertical joints visible in the wall show that gaps were left during the building of the wall to allow access and were filled in later. There is also a tapered, lintelled doorway. Inside is an elaborate network of stairways leading to terraces and corbelled cells in the wall reached by passages.

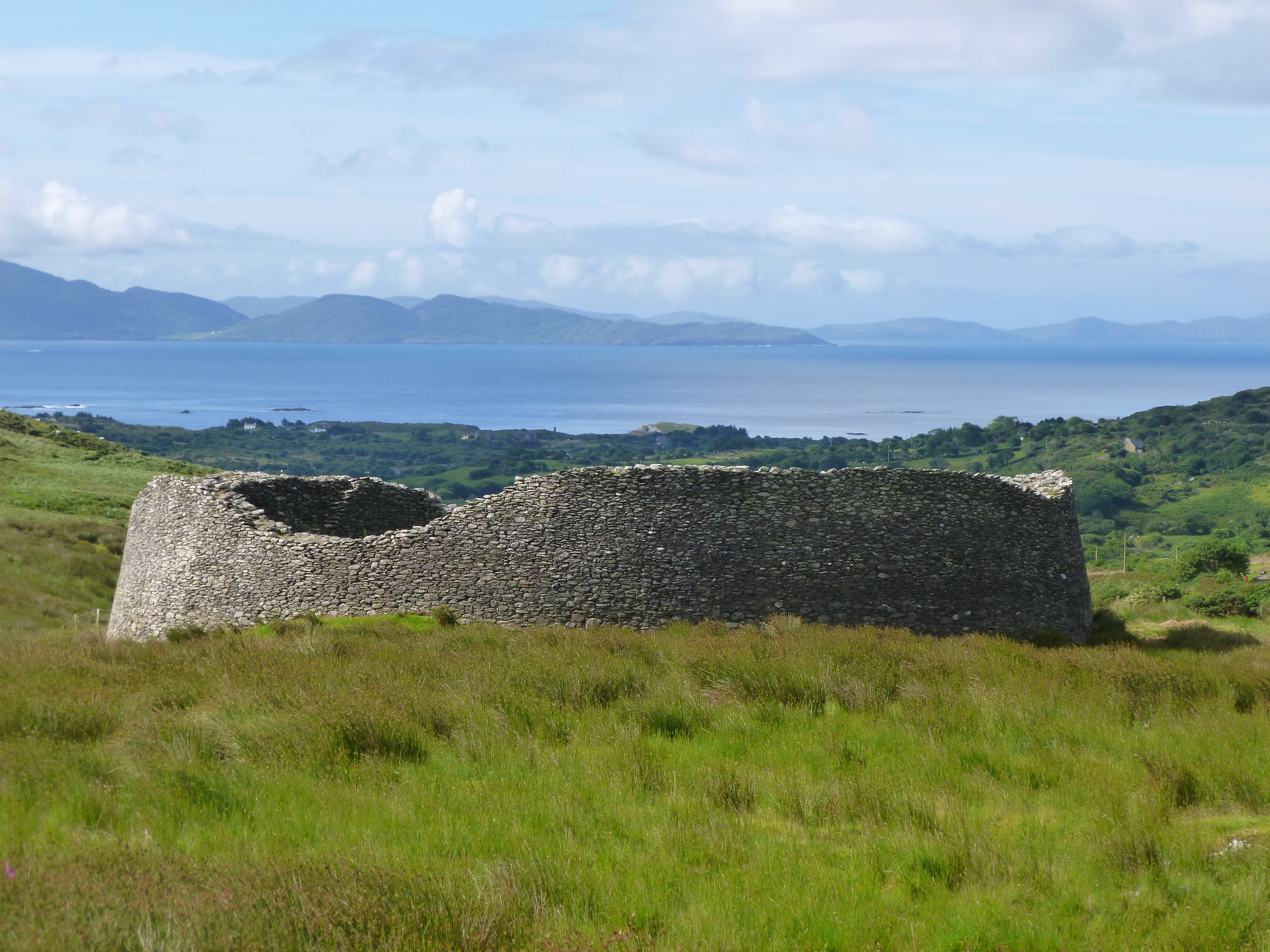
Staigue fort in its landscape setting

There is evidence that copper was excavated in the surrounding area and it appears to be a place of worship, an observatory and a place of defence.
