= Derrynane House =

- Teach Dhoire Fhionáin
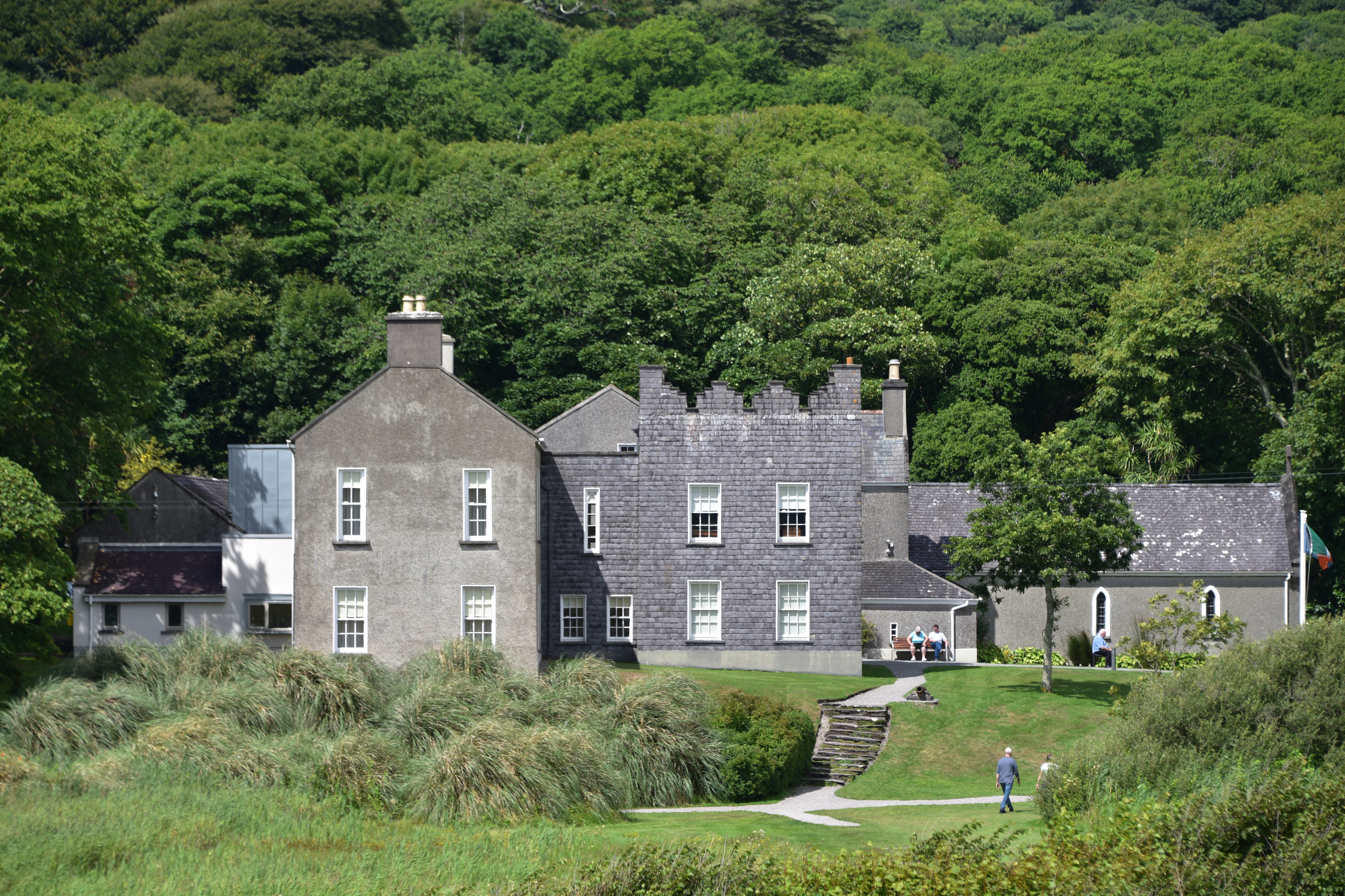
- South facing facade

- Location within Ireland

General information
- Status: Museum
- Type: House
- Location: County Kerry, Ireland
- Coordinates: 51°45′49″N 10°07′44″W
- Construction started: 1825
- Completed: 1844
- Renovated: 1967

Website
- derrynanehouse.ie

Derrynane House (Irish: Teach Dhoire Fhionáin) was the home of Irish politician and statesman, Daniel O'Connell. It is protected as a national monument and part of a 320-acre (1.3 km^{2}) national historic park. The house is located on the Iveragh peninsula on the Ring of Kerry near the village of Derrynane in County Kerry, Ireland (3.5 km from Caherdaniel.

Derrynane House is the ancestral home of Daniel O'Connell, lawyer, politician and statesman. Situated on 120 hectares of parklands on the Kerry coast, the house displays relics of O'Connell's life and career. Guided tours of the house are available on request, along with a visual presentation. Access for visitors with disabilities is limited to the ground floor.

== History ==
While the O'Connell family had previous associations with the area, it was Daniel O'Connell's grandparents, Domhnall Mór Ó Conaill and Máire Ní Dhonnchadha Dhuibh, who built or extended the house in the 1700s. The oldest part of the house, built in 1702, was demolished in 1967 for safety reasons during the restoration work. Daniel O'Connell built the two-storey south wing facing the sea and the library wing to the east in 1825, the oldest surviving part of the house. The chapel was added in 1844 and was modelled on the ruined monastery chapel of Derrynane (Ahamore) Abbey on nearby Abbey Island. Restoration work was completed in 1967, when the house was officially opened to the public as a museum by the then president Éamon de Valera.

== Gallery ==
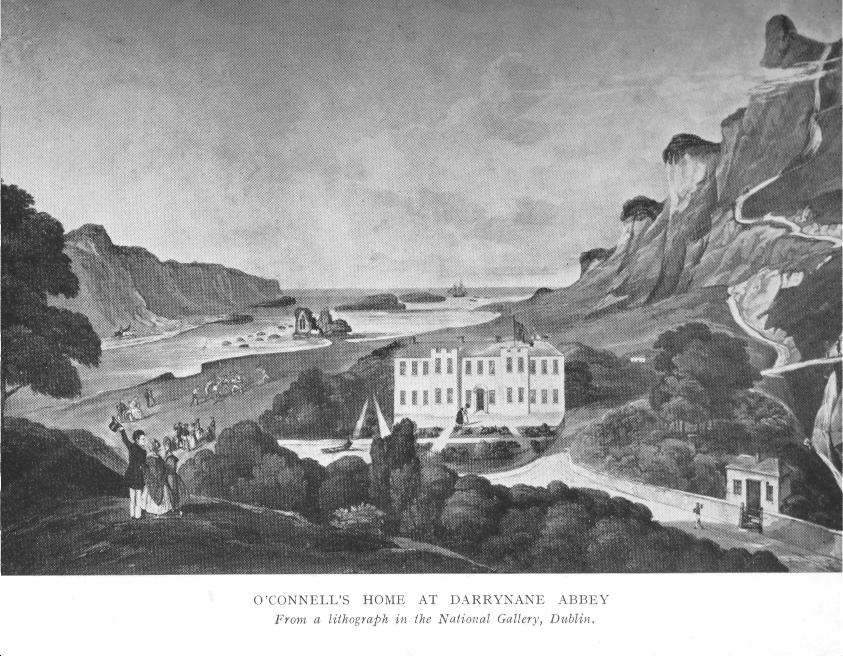
19th century lithograph

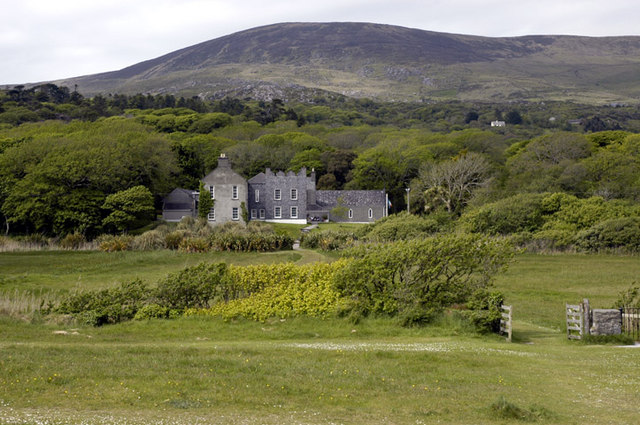
Derrynane House in 2005

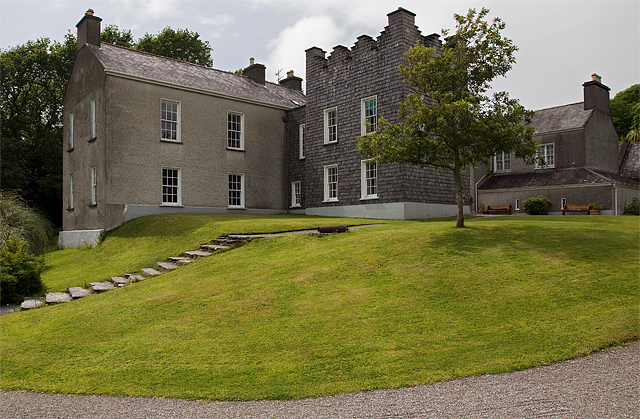
House with castellated sectio
