= List of towns and villages in County Kerry =

List of towns and villages in a county of Ireland

This is a list of towns and villages in County Kerry, Ireland.

== A ==
- Abbeydorney – Mainistir Ó dTorna
- Annascaul – Abhainn an Scáil
- Ardfert – Ard Fhearta
- Asdee - Eas Daoi

== B ==
- Ballinskelligs – Baile an Sceilg
- Ballybunion – Baile an Bhuinneánaigh
- Ballydavid - Baile na nGall
- Ballyduff – An Baile Dubh
- Ballyferriter – Baile an Fheirtéaraigh
- Ballyhar - Baile Uí Aichir
- Ballyheigue – Baile Uí Thaidhg
- Ballylongford – Béal Átha Longfoirt
- Beaufort - Lios an Phuca
- Blennerville – Cathair Uí Mhóráin
- Brosna – Brosnach

== C ==
- Caherdaniel – Cathair Dónall
- Cahersiveen – Cathair Saidhbhín
- Camp – An Com
- Castlecove – An Siopa Dubh
- Castlegregory – Caisleán Ghriaire
- Castleisland – Oileán Ciarraí
- Castlemaine – Caisleán na Mainge
- Causeway – An Tóchar
- Chapeltown - An Caol
- Cloghane - An Clochán
- Cordal – Cordal
- Cromane - An Cromán
- Currans – Na Coirríní
- Currow – Corra

== D ==
- Derrynane – Doire Fhíonáin
- Dingle – Daingean Uí Chúis
- Duagh – Dubháth
- Dún Chaoin – Dún Chaoin

== F ==
- Farranfore – An Fearann Fuar
- Fenit – An Fhianait
- Fieries - Na Foidhrí
- Finuge – Fionnúig
- Fybagh - An Fhadhbach

== G ==
- Glenbeigh – Gleann Beithe
- Glencar - Gleann Chárthaigh
- Glenflesk - Gleann Fleisce
- Gneeveguilla – Gníomh go Leith

== I ==
- Inch - Inse

== K ==
- Kenmare – Neidín
- Kilcummin – Cill Chuimín
- Kilflynn – Cill Flainn
- Kilgobnet – Cill Ghobnait
- Kilgarvan – Cill Gharbháin
- Killarney – Cill Airne
- Killorglin – Cill Orglan
- Kilmorna – Cill Mhaonaigh
- Knightstown – Baile an Ridire
- Knocknagoshel – Cnoc na gCaiseal

== L ==
- Lauragh – Láithreach
- Lispole – Lios Póil
- Lisselton – Lios Eiltín
- Listowel – Lios Tuathail
- Lixnaw – Leic Snámha
- Lyracrumpane – Ladhar an Chrompáin

== M ==
- Milltown – Baile an Mhuilinn
- Moyvane – Maigh Mheáin

== P ==
- Portmagee – An Caladh

== R ==
- Rathmore – An Ráth Mhór

== S ==
- Scartaglen – Scairteach an Ghlinne
- Sneem – An tSnaidhm
- Spa – An Spá
- Stradbally – An tSráidbhaile

== T ==
- Tarbert – Tairbeart
- Tralee – Trá Lí
- Tuosist – Tuath Ó Siosta

== V ==
- Ventry – Ceann Trá

== W ==
- Waterville – An Coireán
