= Tomás Rua Ó Súilleabháin =

Irish poet (1785–1848)

- Born: 1785; Derrynane, Ireland
- Died: 1848 (age 62/63); County Kerry, Ireland
- Resting place: Derrynane Abbey
- Alma mater: Possibly the Kildare Place Society
- Occupations: Poet, fiddler, teacher, dancing master
- Writing career
- Language: Irish
- Years active: early 19th century
- Notable works: "Maidin Bhog Álainn" "Amhrán ne Leabhar"

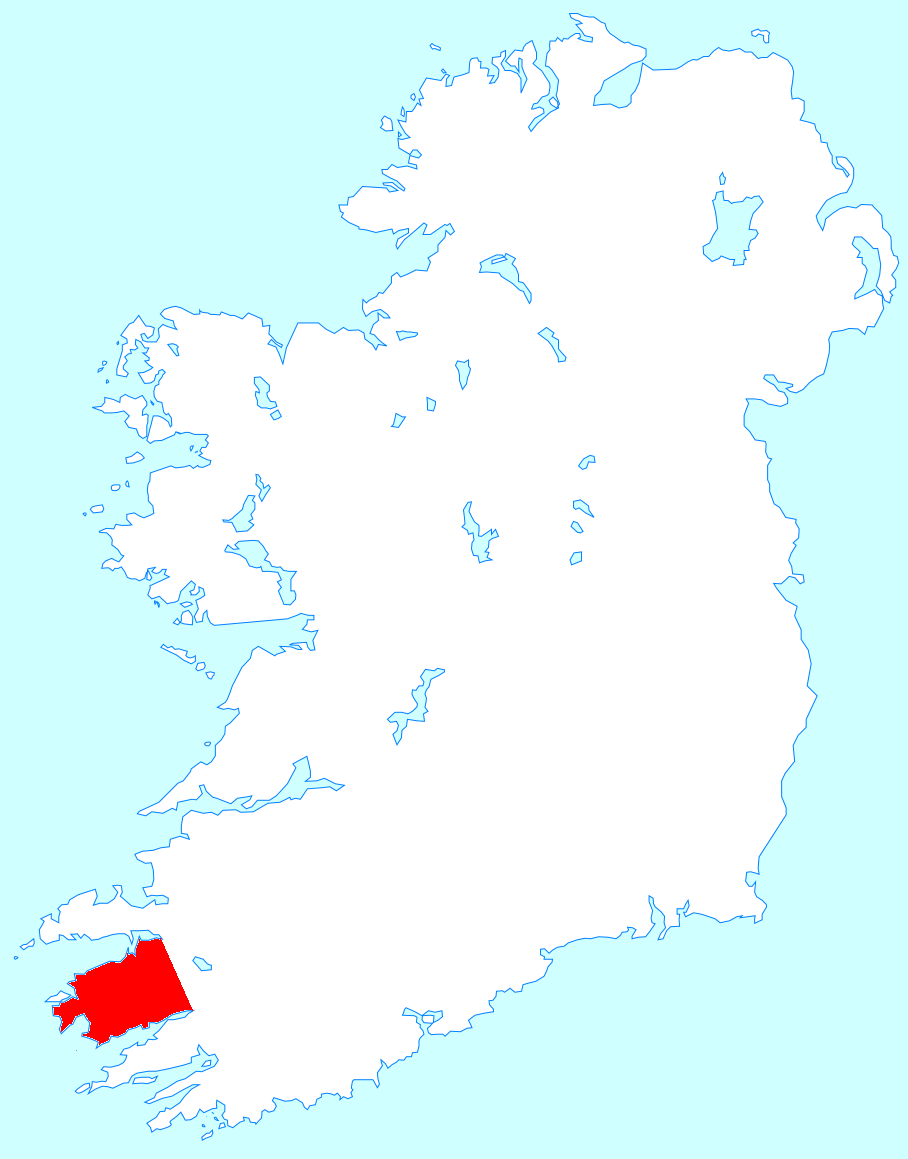
Ó Súilleabháin was born and spent most of his life on the Iveragh Peninsula (shaded red).

Tomás Rua Ó Súilleabháin ([ˈt̪ˠʊmˠaːsˠ ɾˠuə oː ˈsˠuːl̠ʲəˌwaːnʲ]; 'Red [haired] Thomas O'Sullivan'; also spelled Ruadh; 1785–1848) was an Irish-language poet of the 19th century. A native of County Kerry, Ireland, he was a close friend and ally of Irish Catholic political leader Daniel O'Connell.

== Early life ==
Tomás Rua Ó Súilleabháin was born in 1785 in Banard (An Bán Ard), Derrynane, County Kerry to an Irish Catholic family. His father may have been named Tadhg Ó Súilleabháin and was related to the poet Eoghan Rua Ó Súilleabháin (1748–1784). He went to a school in Gort na Cille, and was educated as a teacher in Dublin, maybe that of the Kildare Place Society.

== Career ==
Ó Súilleabháin worked as a hedge school teacher in Caherdaniel; a hedge school was an illegal school that taught Catholics and Presbyterian children, as only Church of Ireland (Anglican) schools were permitted in Ireland at the time. In one poem he complains about getting paid just sixpence a quarter by his pupils. After getting a job in Portmagee, he sent on all his books and papers on a boat from Derrynane to Goleen, only for the boat to sink. This inspired one of his most famous works, "Amhrán ne Leabhar" ('song of the books'), also called "Cuan Bhéil Inse" ('Valentia Harbour'). It gives an insight into the kind of literature used by hedge schoolmaster: Euclid, Cato the Elder, the New Testament, the Psalter of Cashel and Foras Feasa ar Éirinn are all mentioned. He also composed an air on the fiddle for "Amhrán na Leabhar," which is still popular.

While sick with tuberculosis he wrote the hymn "A Rí an Domhnaigh" ('O King of Sunday').

A supporter and friend of Daniel O'Connell, after O'Connell won the 1828 County Clare by-election, Ó Súilleabháin wrote "Guím slán go hUíbh Ráthach" ("I wish farewell to Iveragh") and "Is é Donall binn Ó Conaill caoin" ("He is sweet and gentle Daniel O'Connell").

Another well-known quatrain mocks two Protestant men for not keeping Catholic fasts.

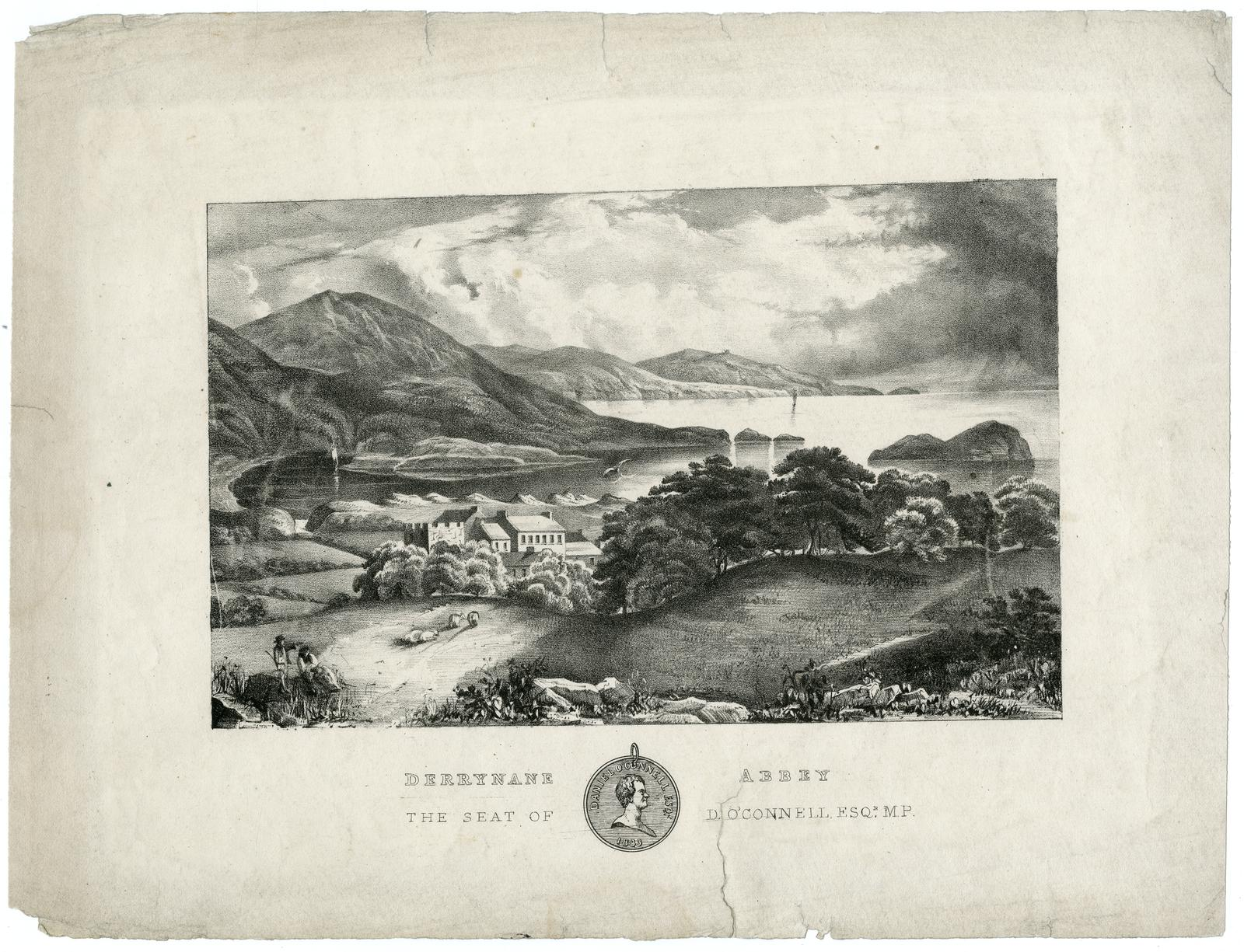
Derrynane Abbey c. 1833.

== Death and legacy ==
Ó Súilleabháin died in 1848 during the Great Famine of 1845–50 and was buried at Derrynane Abbey. Some of his last poems were about the Famine.

He never married and had no children. A collection of his work, Amhráin Thomáis Ruaidh ('Songs of Red Thomas'), was first published in 1914 (compiled by James Fenton) and republished in 1985. A memorial plaque was erected in 1928.
