= R566 road (Ireland) =

Road in Ireland

R566 road
- Bóthar R566
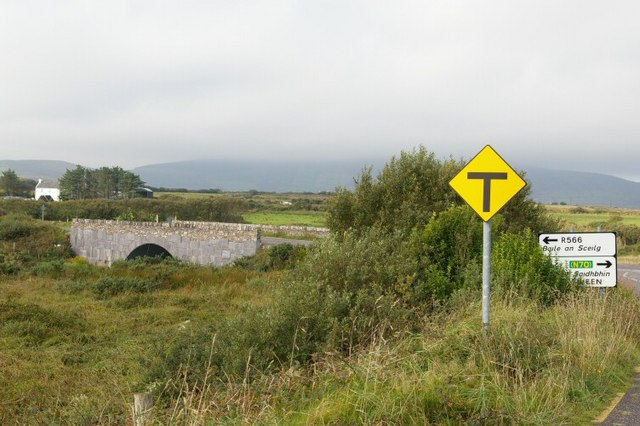
- R566 bridge at Emlaghmore

Route information
- Length: 25.5 km (15.8 mi)

Major junctions
- From: N70 at Kilcoman, County Kerry
- R567 at Emlaghmore Bridge
- To: R565 at Portmagee

Location
- Country: Ireland

Highway system
- Roads in Ireland; Motorways; Primary; Secondary; Regional
← R565	→ R567

The R566 road is a regional road in Ireland. It is a road on the Iveragh Peninsula in County Kerry. Part of the road is on the Wild Atlantic Way.

The R566 travels southwest from the N70 (Ring of Kerry) to Ballinskelligs. At Ballinskelligs, the road becomes the Skellig Ring, travelling northwest via the coast. Along this coast, high-cliffed Puffin Island, an important seabird reserve, lies just offshore. The road terminates at the R565 at Portmagee, where Valentia Island may be reached by bridge. The R566 is 25.5 km (15.8 mi) long.
