= R565 road (Ireland) =

Road in Ireland

R565 road
- Bóthar R565
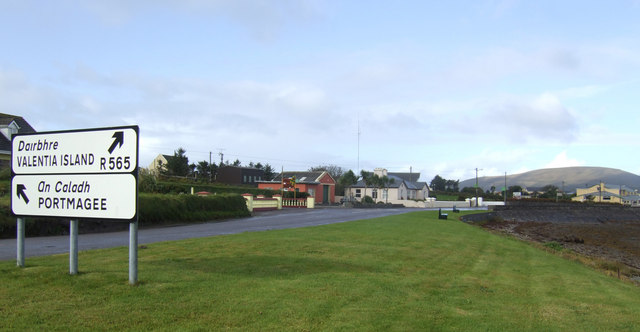
- R565 at Portmagee

Route information
- Length: 18.5 km (11.5 mi)

Major junctions
- From: N70 at Laharan South, County Kerry
- R566 at Portmagee
- To: The Promenade, Knightstown

Location
- Country: Ireland

Highway system
- Roads in Ireland; Motorways; Primary; Secondary; Regional
← R564	→ R566

The R565 road is a regional road in County Kerry, in south-western Ireland. It is 18.5 km (11.5 mi) long and runs along the Iveragh Peninsula and Valentia Island. The road has two crossings to the island; the permanent Maurice O'Neill Memorial Bridge, and a seasonal vehicle ferry at Knightstown.

== Route ==
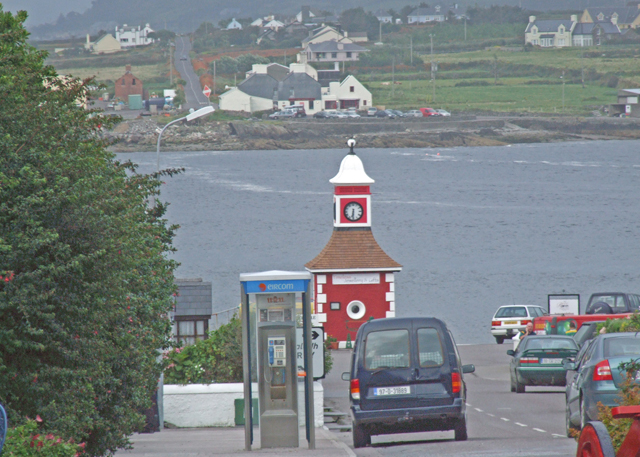
R565 in Knightstown

The R565 begins on the N70, a National secondary road through County Kerry. It travels west along the northern edge of the Iveragh Peninsula following the Portmagee Channel, which separates Valentia Island from the peninsula. It crosses the River Derreen at Aghnagar Bridge and follows the channel as far as Portmagee. There, the road crosses the Maurice O'Neill Memorial Bridge to Valentia Island, the only direct road access.

Travelling east across the island via Chapeltown, the road runs through the port village of Knightstown, where a ferry runs to the mainland. The end of the road is at the ferry terminal; there is a local road connecting the other side of the ferry back to the N70, but it is not part of the R565. (Note: The local road, the L4005, is signposted "Valentia Island Ferry" from the N70, while the R565 is signposted "Knightstown") The ferry is seasonal and runs from around mid-March to October.

The road is part of the Wild Atlantic Way from Knightstown to Portmagee across the island.

== History ==
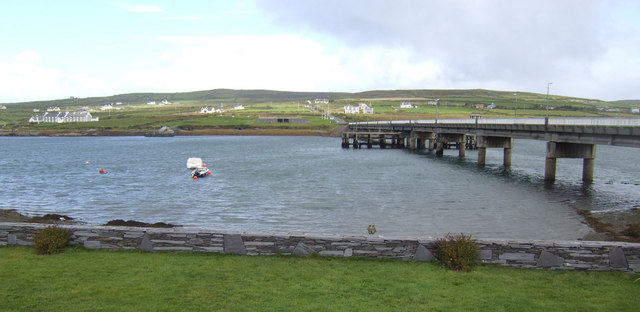
Maurice O'Neill Memorial Bridge

Before 1971, the only access to Valentia Island was via a ferry. A fixed link onto the island had been planned since 1911, but was postponed because of World War I and then the Irish War of Independence. The project was revisited in the 1940s, and various bridge committees were formed over the next few decades to design and build a suitable structure, against an increasingly impatient local public, fed up of having to rely on ferries. The crossing was designed as a swing bridge to allow shipping traffic through the Portmagee Channel.

The bridge was unofficially opened on 1 January 1971 by former Fianna Fáil minister Neil Blaney. It was named the Maurice O'Neill Memorial Bridge after the local republican activist Maurice O'Neill who was executed in 1942 under the government of Éamon de Valera. The opening was considered controversial, and a second ceremony was performed by Kerry County Council that Easter.

In 2002, Kerry County Council investigated the bridge's swing mechanism but concluded repairs would cost €500,000, which they could not afford. By 2008, the council had concluded the bridge had rusted beyond repair and would never open. In 2011, concerns were made about the bridge's faulty lifting mechanism, which was preventing completion of a €3.3 million improvement of Cahersiveen marina as it blocked sailing traffic through the Portmagee Channel.

The ferry service from the end of the R565 to the mainland has been operational since 1961. In 2017, there were concerns the ferry would be discontinued as the fleet needed replacing at a cost of around €3 million. The previous year, it handled 250,000 passengers and 100,000 cars. In 2018 the ferry was reprieved for another two years service with the expenditure of €200,000 to bring it up to acceptable marine safety standards. The ferry supports Valentia as an additional tourist attraction to the Wild Atlantic Way, the Ring of Kerry, and the Skellig Ring.
