= R566 road =

R566 road may refer to:

- R566 road (Ireland)
- R566 road (South Africa)
