= R565 road =

R565 road may refer to:

- R565 road (Ireland)
- R565 road (South Africa)
