= R568 road (Ireland) =

Regional road in County Kerry, Ireland

R568 road
- Bóthar R568
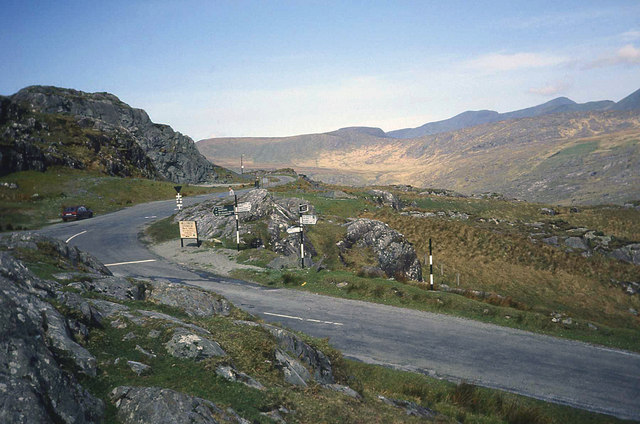
- Junction of N71 and R568 at Moll's Gap

Route information
- Length: 22.9 km (14.2 mi)

Major junctions
- From: N70 at Sneem, County Kerry
- To: N71 at Moll's Gap

Location
- Country: Ireland

Highway system
- Roads in Ireland; Motorways; Primary; Secondary; Regional
← R567	→ R569

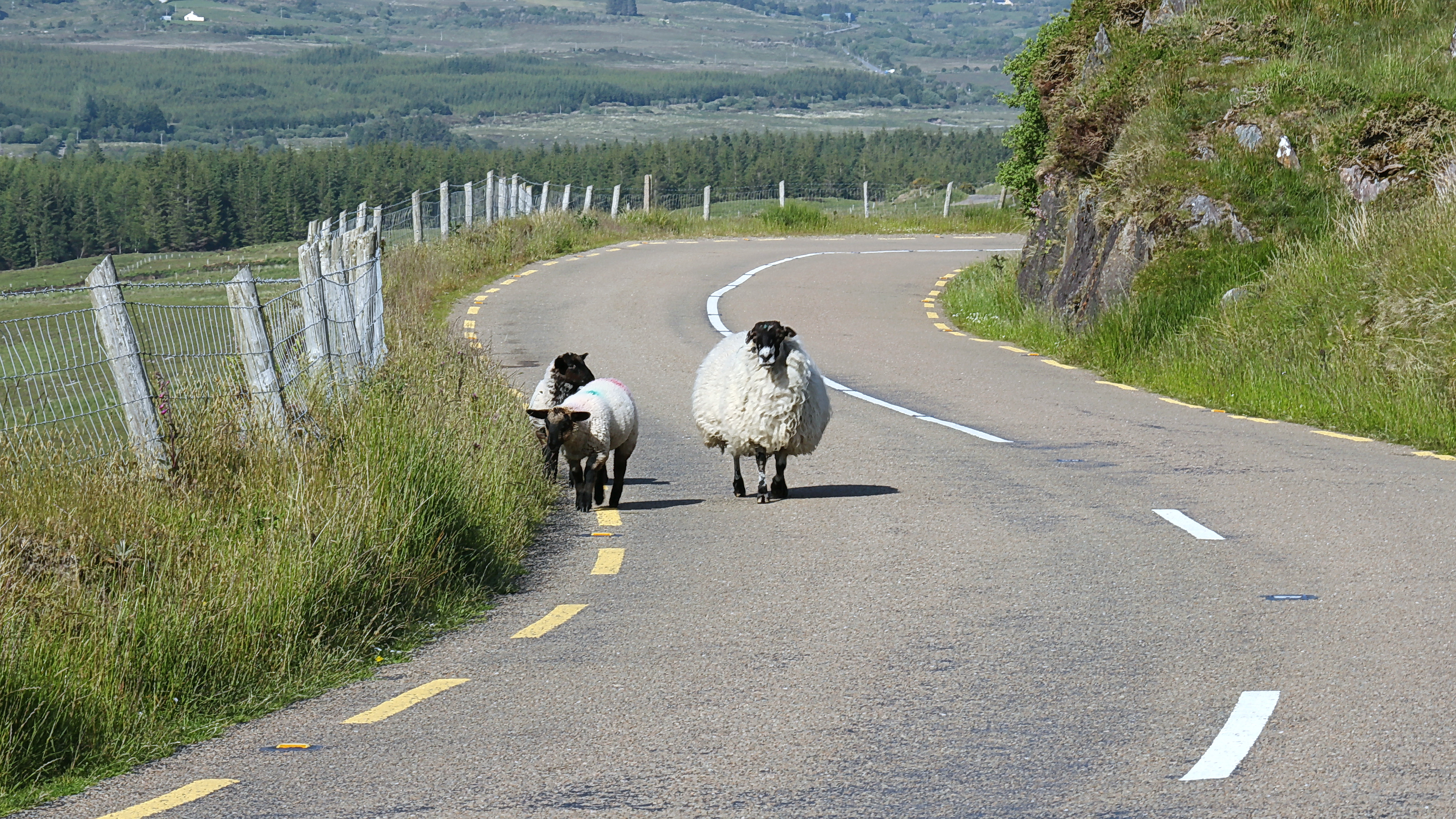
R568 at Dromlusk

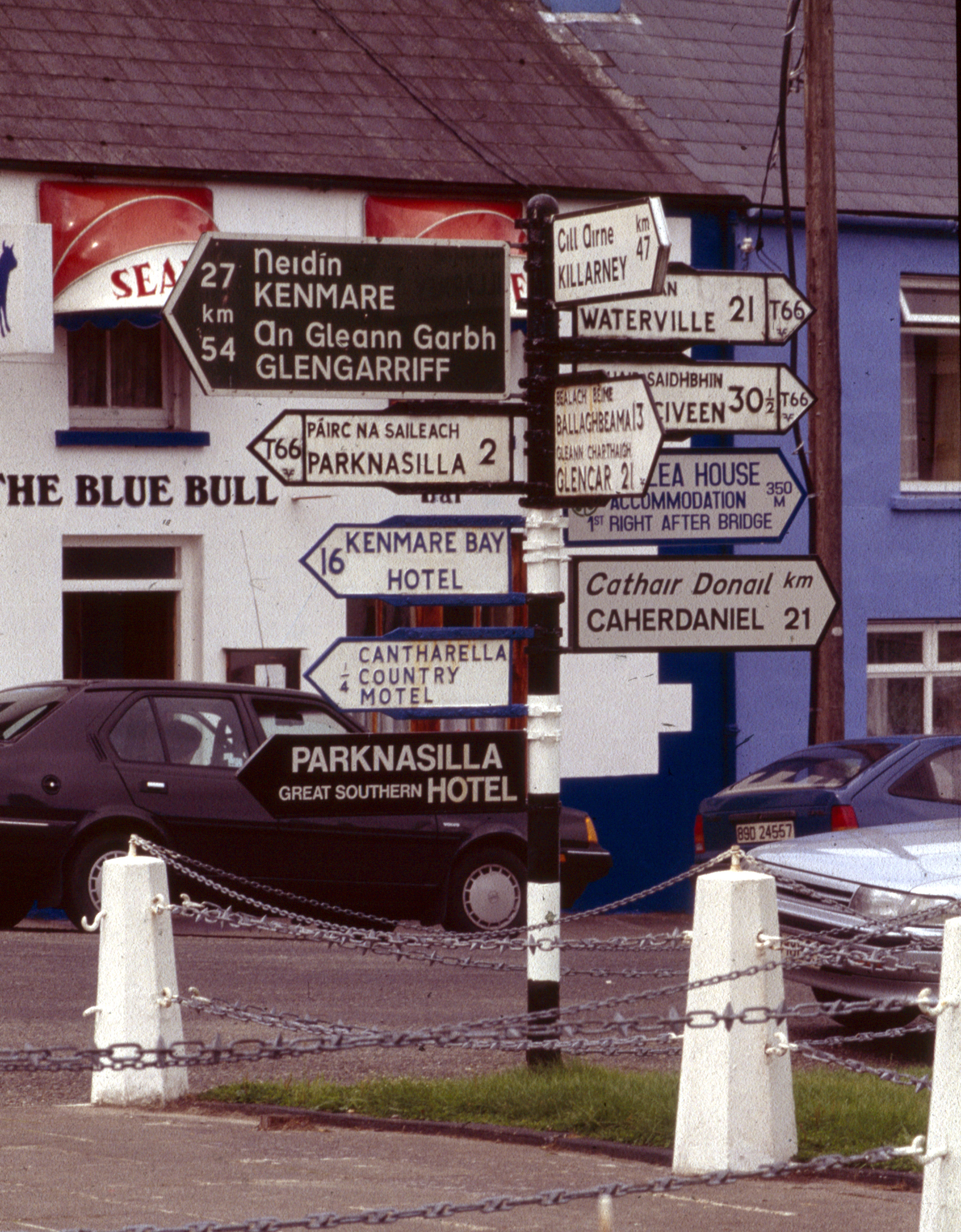
Sneem signpost at junction of N70 and R568

The R568 road is a regional road on the Iveragh Peninsula in County Kerry, Ireland. It travels from the N70 road at Sneem to the N71 at Moll's Gap. The road is 22.9 kilometres (14.2 mi) long.
