= R568 road =

R568 road may refer to:

- R568 road (Ireland)
- R568 (South Africa)
