= R567 road =

R567 road may refer to:

- R567 road (Ireland)
- R567 road (South Africa)
