= Derrynane Abbey =

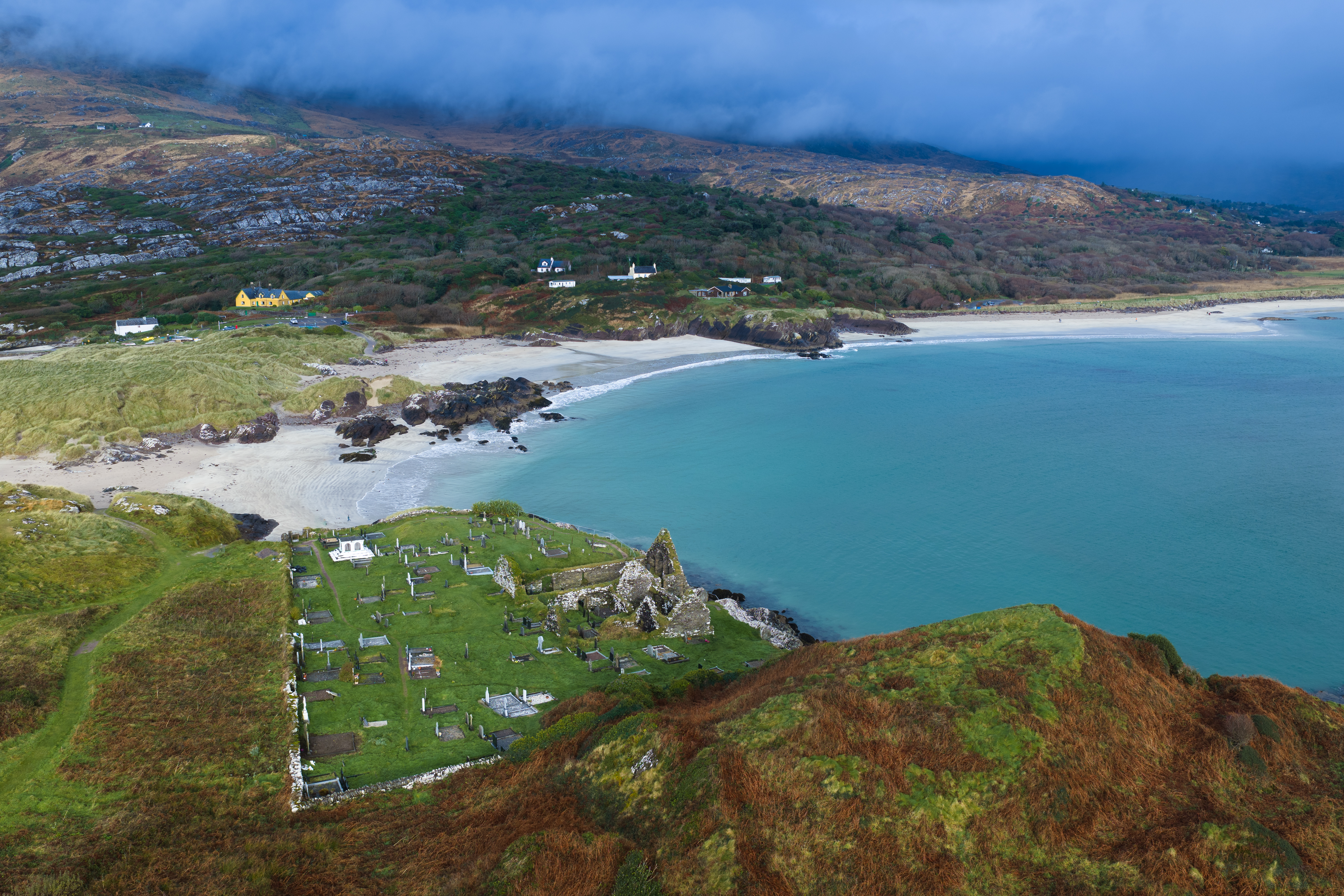
- Southern aerial view of the abbey

- Location within Ireland
- Interactive map of Derrynane Abbey

Monastery information
- Other name: Ahamore Abbey

Site
- Location: County Kerry
- Coordinates: 51°45′27″N 10°08′34″W
- Visible remains: church
- Public access: yes

Derrynane Abbey also known as Ahamore Abbey (Irish: Mainistir Achaidh Mhóir) is a ruined abbey in Derrynane in County Kerry, Ireland. It is located near the town of Caherdaniel and is very close to Derrynane House, the house of Daniel O'Connell. The abbey is on an island appropriately named Abbey Island. It is accessible from the mainland through a beach. It is believed to have been built in the 6th century.

== Structure ==
The Abbey itself is in ruin. There are only 3 interconnecting buildings of the abbey left, all without a roof. The main church, like the other buildings, is overgrown and contains a number of graves, including those of Mary O'Connell (wife of Daniel O'Connell) and the nineteenth-century Gaelic poet, Tomás Rua Ó Súilleabháin. The three arched windows of the church are in good condition even though they are facing the sea. The other two buildings have little else of note but graves. In the graveyard surrounding the abbey, there is tomb made of white tile which has been chipped away in places.

== Gallery ==
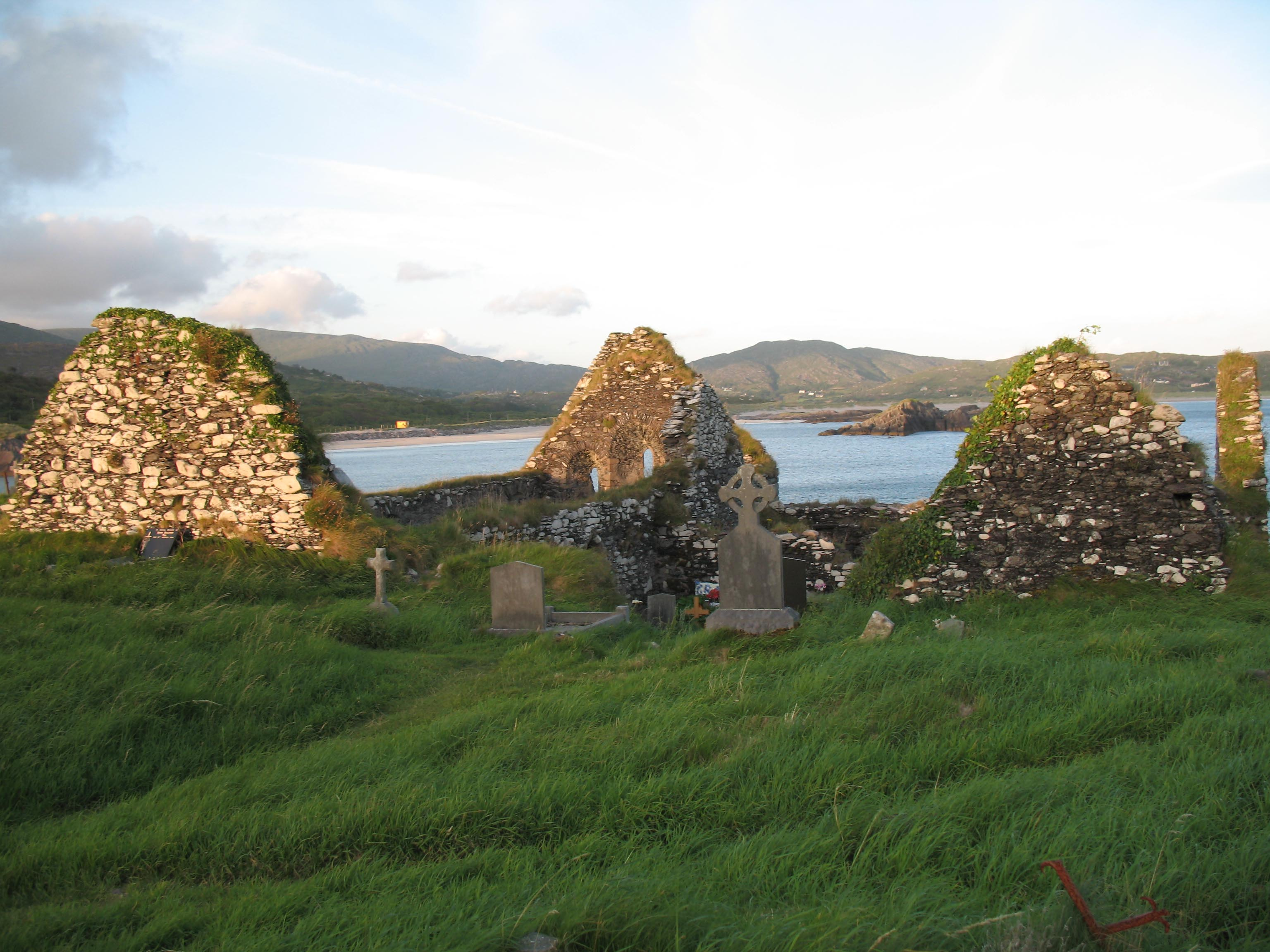
Derrynane Abbey

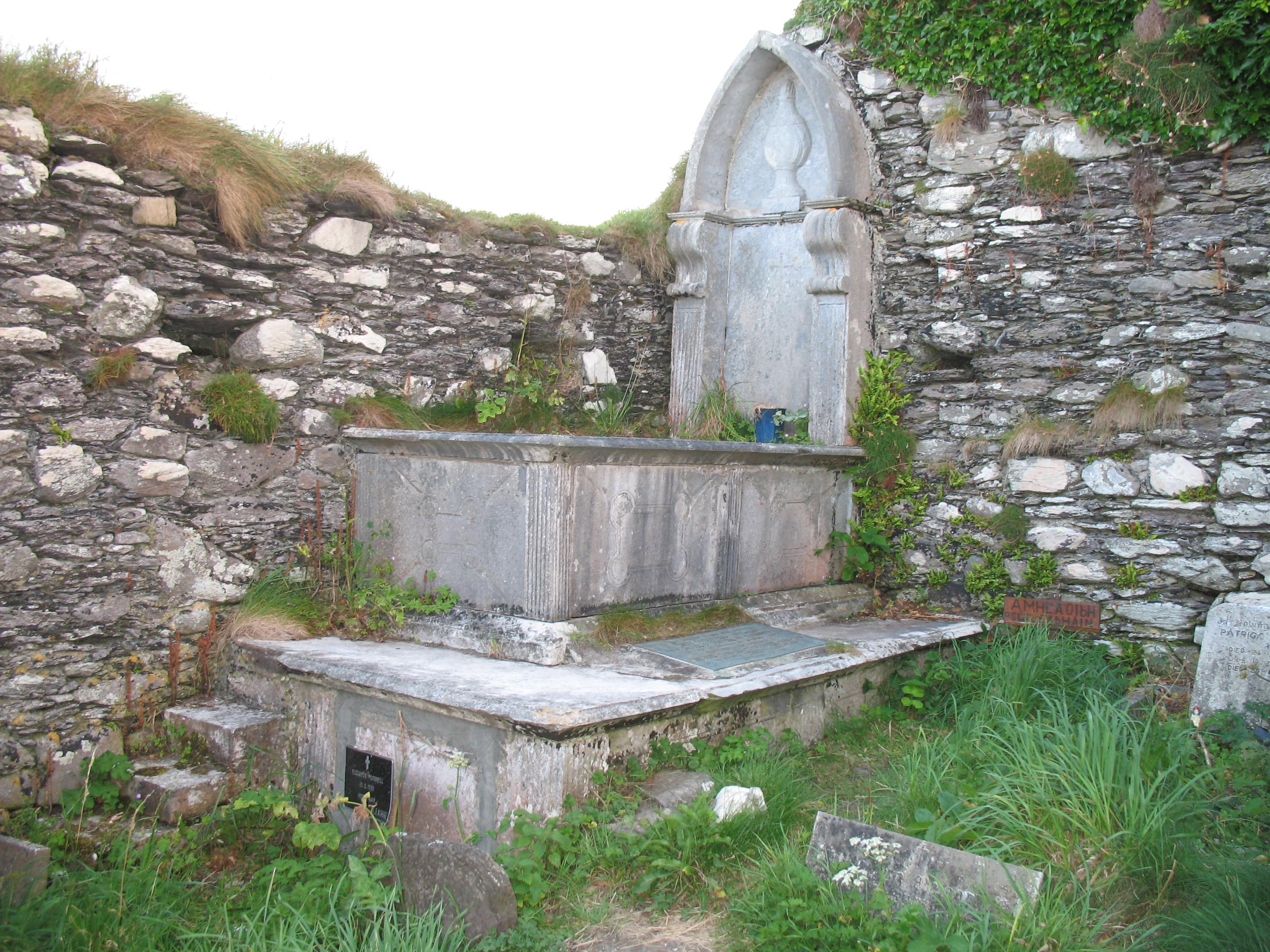
Mary O'Connell's Grave

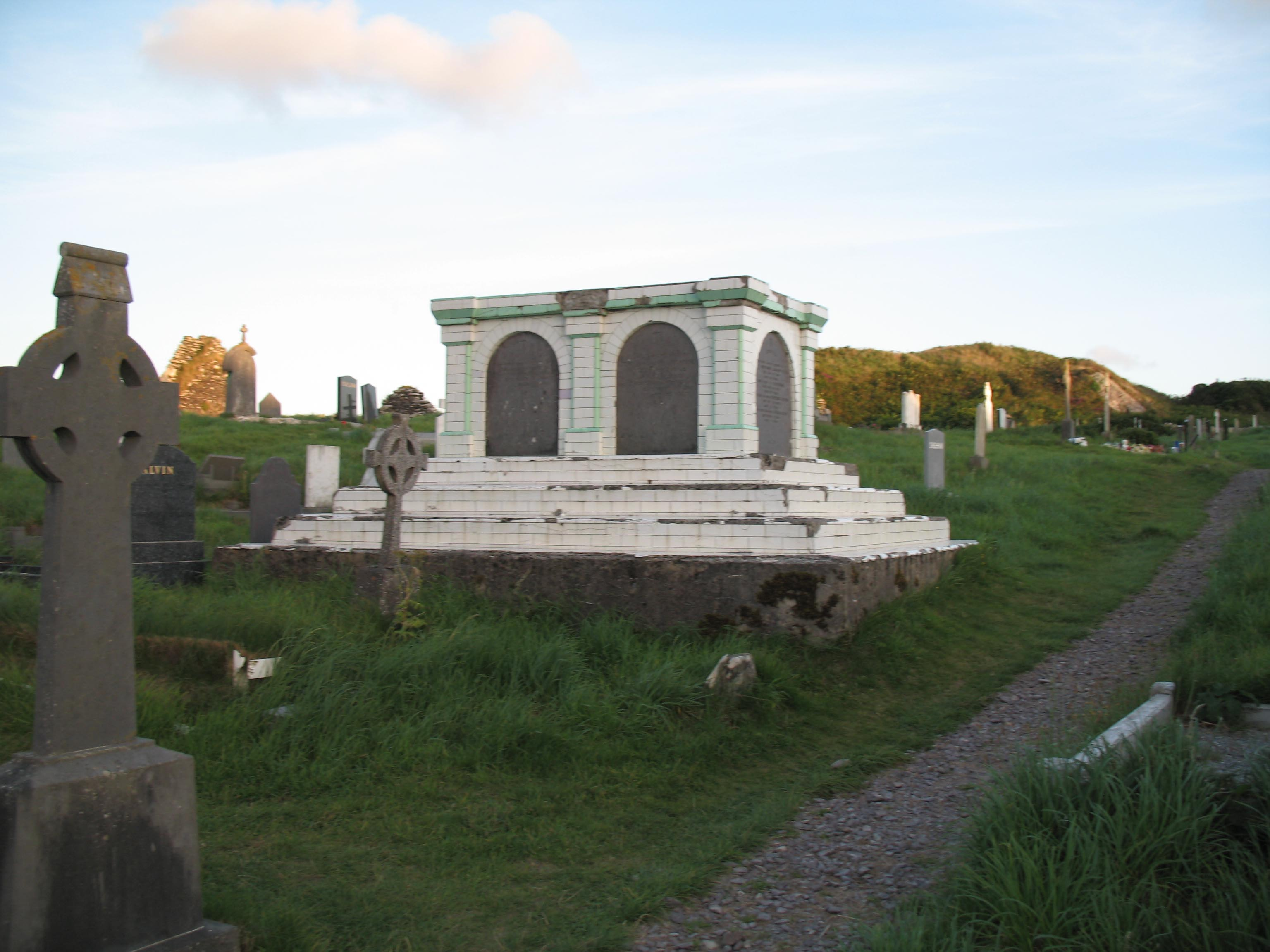
White Tiled Tomb

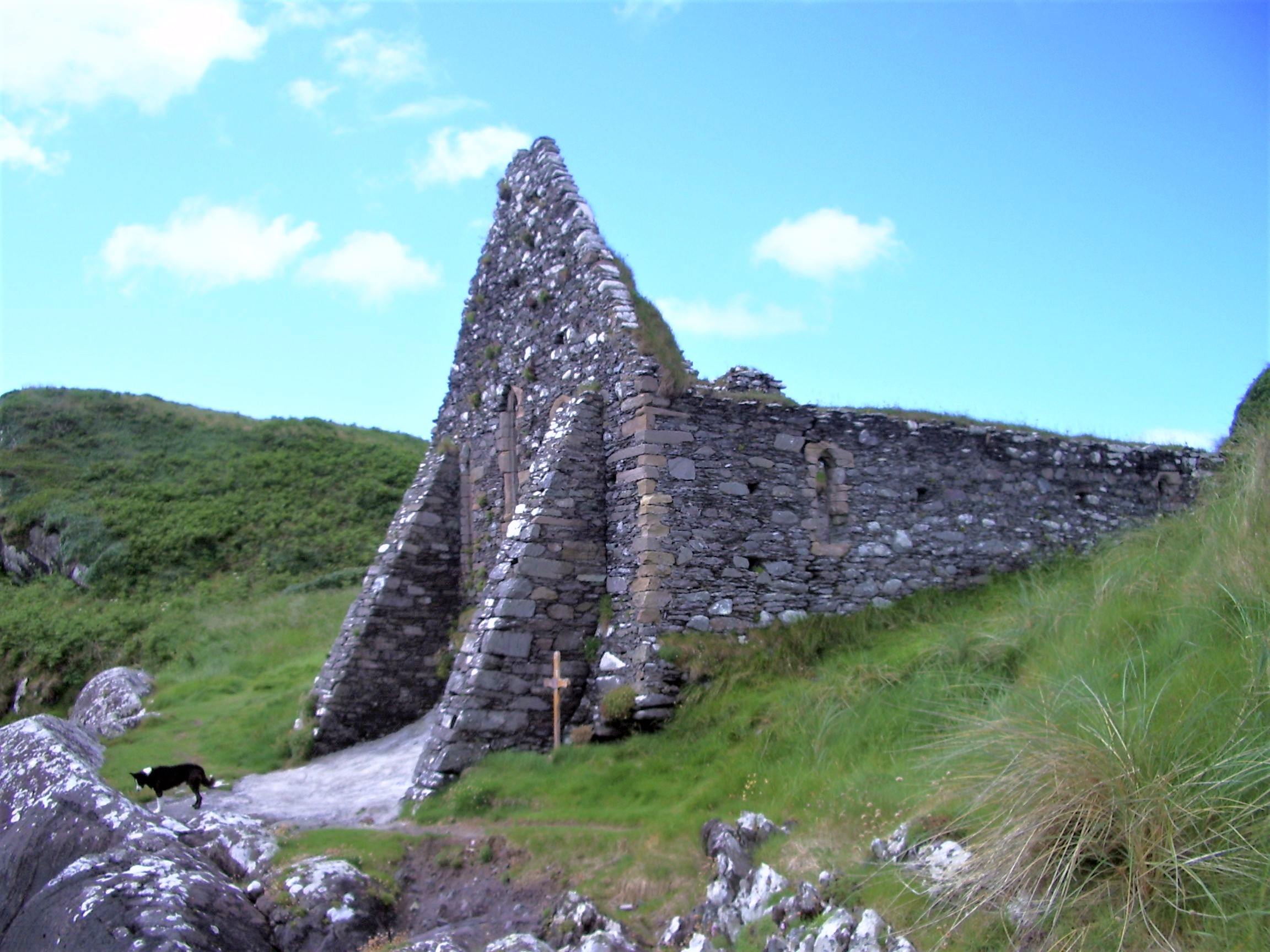
The ruins of Derrynane Abbey
