= Kerry International Dark-Sky Reserve =

Dark-sky preserve in Ireland

- Tearmann Chiarraí na Spéire Dorcha
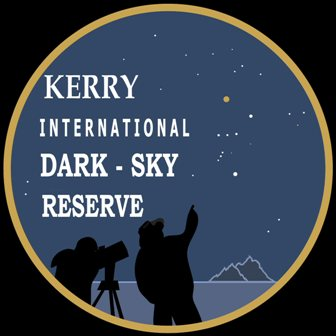
- Logo of the Kerry International Dark-Sky Reserve

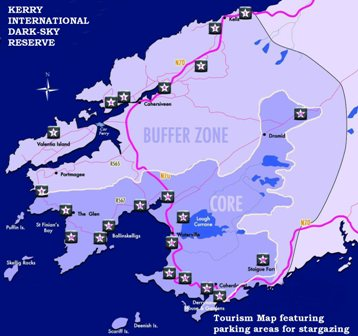
- Map of the Kerry International Dark-Sky Reserve
- Location: County Kerry, Ireland
- Nearest city: Killarney
- Area: 700 km^{2} (270 sq mi)
- Designated: 2014
- Governing body: International Dark-Sky Association
- Website: www.kerrydarkskytourism.com

The Kerry International Dark-Sky Reserve (KIDSR; Irish: Tearmann Chiarraí na Spéire Dorcha) is a dark-sky preserve in County Kerry, Ireland. It was designated Ireland's first International Dark Sky Reserve by the International Dark-Sky Association (IDA). Kerry International Dark-Sky Reserve was awarded the Gold Tier Award on 27 January 2014, by the IDA. It was the first Gold Tier Reserve in the northern hemisphere, and is one of only four Gold Tier Dark-Sky Reserves in the world.

== Location ==
The Kerry International Dark-Sky Reserve is approximately 700 square kilometres (172,974 acres; 270 sq mi) in size and covers nine regions.

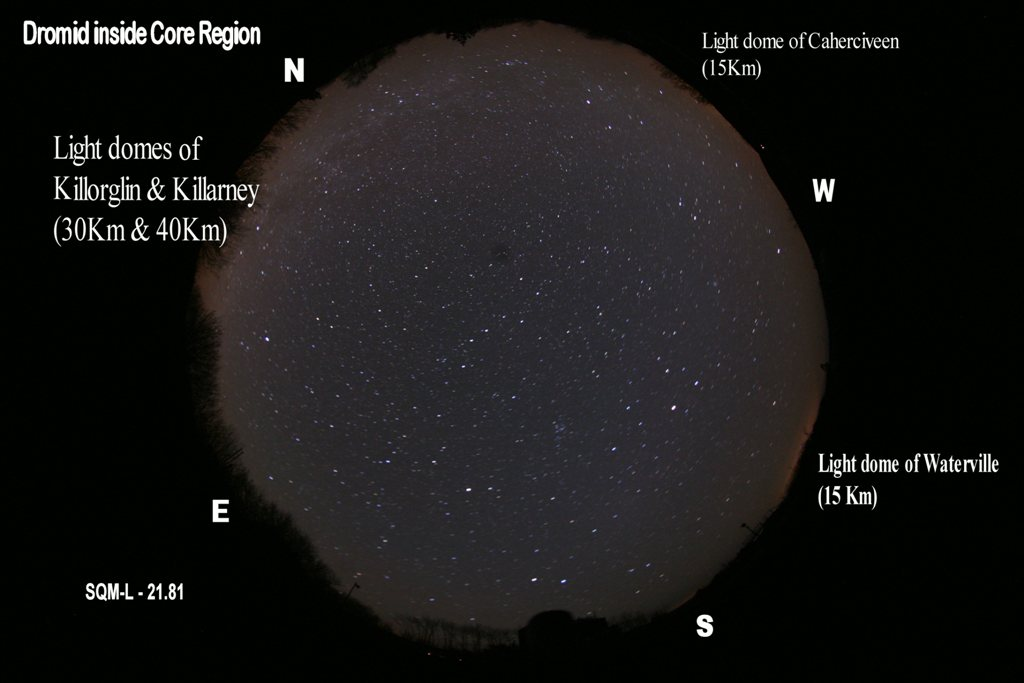
This is an all-sky photo of the skies inside the Core Zone of the Reserve.

1. Kells/Foilmore
2. Cahersiveen
3. Valentia Island
4. Portmagee
5. The Glen
6. Ballinskelligs
7. Waterville
8. Dromid
9. Derrynane/Caherdaniel

The Kerry Dark-Sky Group office is situated in Dungeagan, Ballinskelligs, County Kerry, Ireland.

== History ==
The Kerry Dark-Sky Group was created in 2013 after several out-reach meetings with local community groups in the Reserve at the request of attendees to the gatherings. The purpose of the Kerry Dark-Sky Group is to promote astro-tourism in the Reserve via community projects, local outreach, and events.

=== Collaborations ===
On 5 August 2014, the Kerry International Dark-Sky Reserve officially twinned with the Aoraki Mackenzie Gold Tier Reserve in New Zealand.
