= R567 road (Ireland) =

Road in Ireland

R567 road
- Bóthar R567
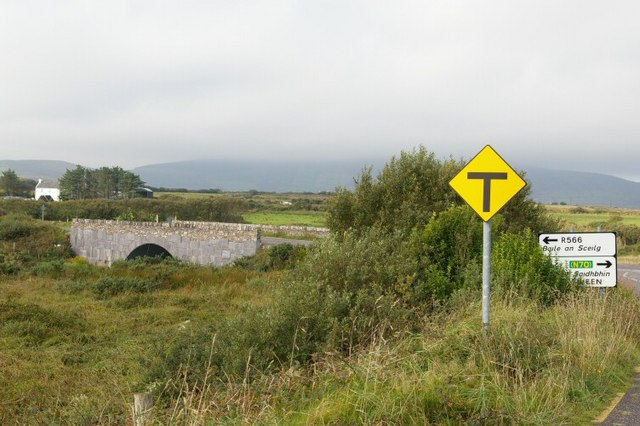
- Approaching junction with R566

Route information
- Length: 5.9 km (3.7 mi)

Major junctions
- From: N70 at Kenneigh, County Kerry
- To: R566 at Emlaghmore Bridge

Location
- Country: Ireland

Highway system
- Roads in Ireland; Motorways; Primary; Secondary; Regional
← R566	→ R568

The R567 road is a regional road in Ireland. It is a road on the Iveragh Peninsula in County Kerry. The road is part of the Wild Atlantic Way. Parts of the road form part of the Emlagh Loop walking trail.

The R567 travels west from the N70 to terminate at the R566 at Emlaghmore Bridge. The R567 is 5.9 km (3.7 mi) long.
