= Illaunloughan =

- Oileán Lócháin
- Location within Ireland
- Interactive map of Illaunloughan

Monastery information
- Established: late 7th century AD
- Disestablished: 9th century AD
- Diocese: Kerry

Architecture
- Status: ruined
- Style: Celtic

Site
- Location: Portmagee, County Kerry
- Coordinates: 51.886589°N 10.373427°W
- Visible remains: stone oratory, a reliquary and a stone beehive hut
- Public access: yes

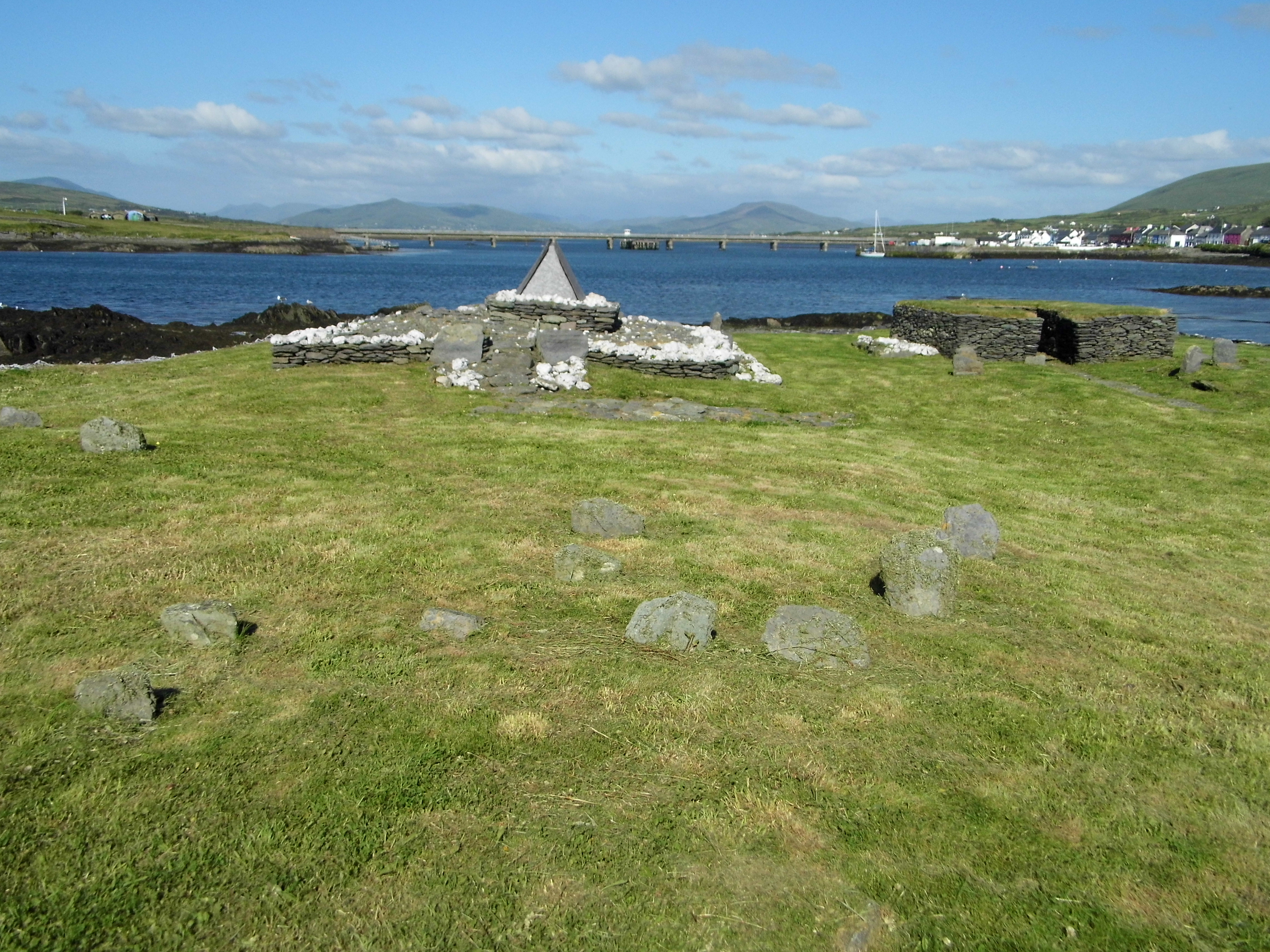
Early Medieval ecclesiastical site

Illaunloughan is a medieval Christian monastery and National Monument located in County Kerry, Ireland. The site is located on a tiny island of 0.3 acres (0.1 ha) in Portmagee Channel, a channel separating Valentia Island from the Iveragh Peninsula.

== History ==
A monastery was founded here in the late 7th century AD, but had ceased to exist by the 9th century. Two saints named Lochan appear in the Martyrology of Tallaght (c. AD 800); one could have been the founder, although lochan could also refer to seaweed. Illaunloughan may have been a stopping-off point for pilgrims travelling to Sceilg Mhichíl, which lies 17 km (9 nm) to the southwest. Excavation revealed middens containing the remnants of meat, oats, seabirds and fish. Also revealed were earthen oratories and casting of fine metalwork.

Up to the 20th century Illaunloughan was used as a cillín for the burial of unbaptised infants and as a graveyard by local people.

== Description ==
There are 8th-century dry stone oratories and altars (leachta) and a gable shrine for the relics of the community's saints. These relics were decorated with quartz and scallop shells, perhaps in reference to the use of the shell on the Church of the Holy Sepulchre or the Camino de Santiago.
