= Chapeltown, County Kerry =

Village on Valentia Island, Ireland

Chapeltown
Native name: Caol
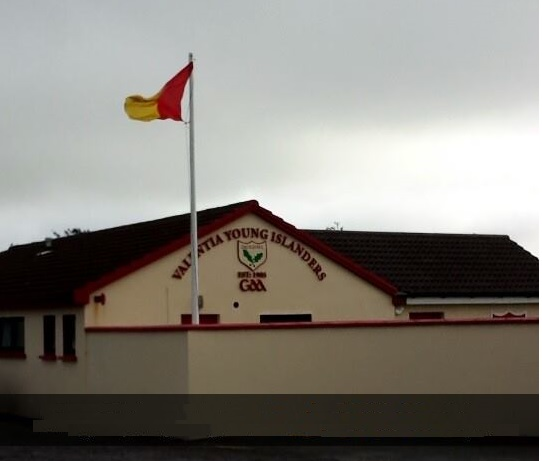
- O'Connor Park GAA ground, Chapeltown

- Location within island of Ireland

Geography
- Location: Atlantic Ocean
- Coordinates: 51.907°N 10.335°W

Administration
- Ireland
- Province: Munster
- County: Kerry

Demographics
- Population: 105 (2022)

Chapeltown (Irish: An Caol) is a village on Valentia Island in the south-west of County Kerry. It is the second major settlement on the Island, the other being Knightstown 4 kilometers away. Chapeltown is located in the centre of the Island, approximately 3 kilometers from the bridge which links the island to the mainland at Portmagee.

Chapeltown is a relatively small village with a basic range of services and is the first settlement reached when travelling to Valentia over the bridge from Portmagee. The island primary school (Scoil Naisiúnta Dar Earca), a community center and GAA grounds serve the entire island. In this sense Chapeltown acts as the social centre for Valentia island as a whole.

== Environment ==
Chapeltown is located on relatively flat land, less than a kilometre from Portmagee channel on the southern shoreline of Valentia Island. To the north of the village, Geokaun mountain dominates the northern skyline. A small river flows through the village traversed by a bridge with a couple of large garden areas with mature trees and these give the village a rural aspect. The village participates annually in the "Tidy Towns" competition.

== History ==
This was one of many villages developed around newly constructed churches following Catholic Emancipation in the 1830s, in this instance the church of St. Dorarca and St. Teresa. At one time the village had a range of small businesses serving the surrounding community, including a post office, shops and public houses. Today, the village primarily serves as the communal hub for the island with the local church, school and community centre contained within its environs.

== Places of interest ==
Located in the village are a Catholic church and the local GAA park where played such footballing legends as Mick O'Connell. The Ring-Lyne hotel adjacent to the bridge was named for 2 local men who participated in Ireland's fight for independence in the early decades of the 20th century.

== Sport ==
Valentia Young Islanders GAA is the local Gaelic Athletic Association club and is located in O'Conner park in Chapeltown.

== Notable people ==
Gaelic footballer and winner of three senior All-Ireland winner's medals Ger Lynch lives near Chapeltown.
