= Camp, County Kerry =

Camp An Com
- Village
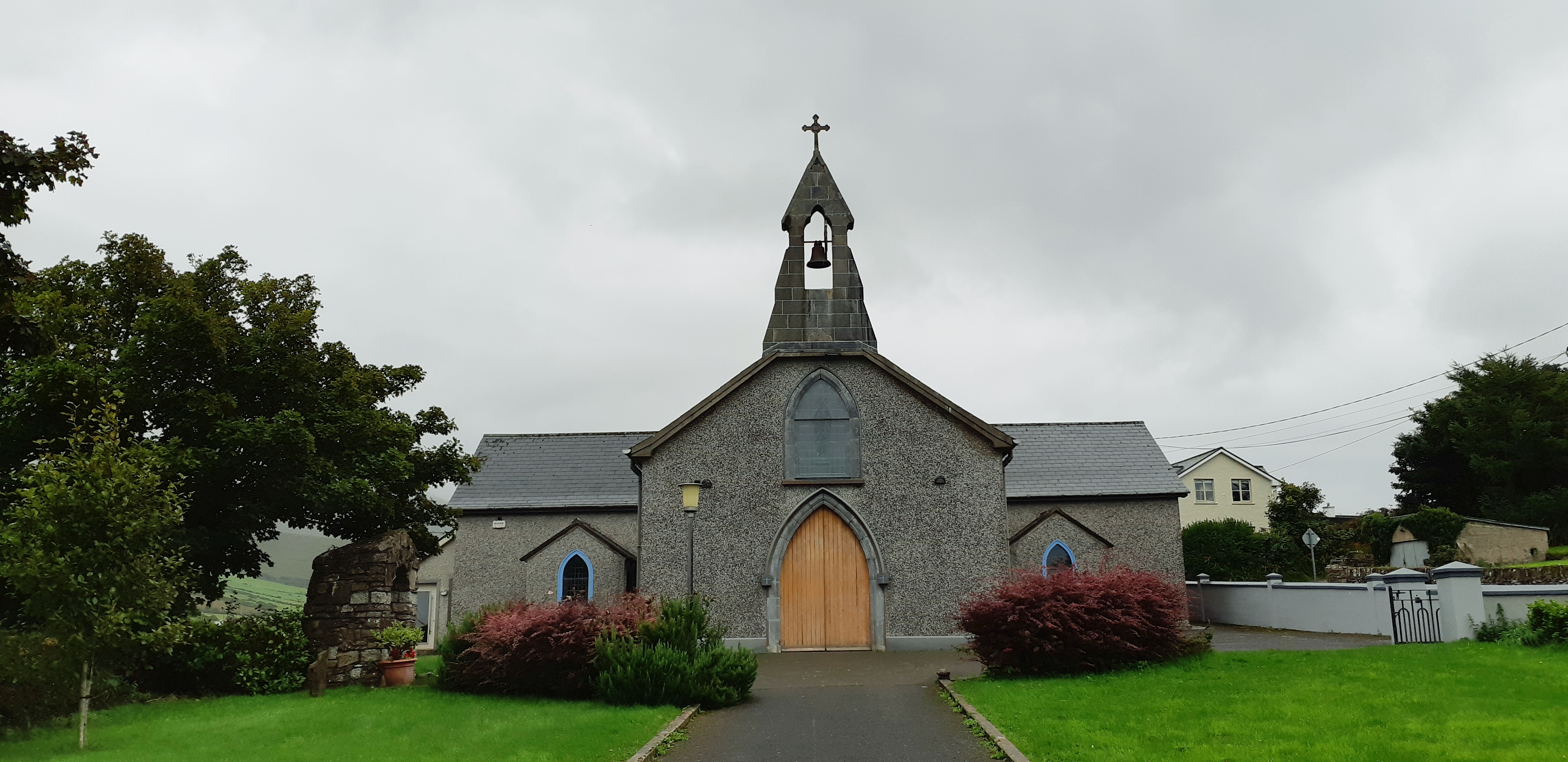
- St Mary's Church, Camp, County Kerry

- Location in Ireland
- Coordinates: 52°13′15″N 9°54′32″W
- Country: Ireland
- Province: Munster
- County: County Kerry

Camp (Irish: An Com) is a village near the Slieve Mish Mountains in County Kerry, Ireland, on the Dingle Peninsula. It is close to the Dingle Way and is a destination for tourists.

== History ==
The village has been associated with the Milesians legend, thus the first possible recorded history from the area dates to around 1700 BC. Local rail transport used to include the route along the Tralee and Dingle Light Railway. Killelton Church, a medieval National Monument, lies 2.5 km (1.6 mi) to the east.

The local Roman Catholic church, which is dedicated to Saint Mary, was built c. 1830.

== See also ==
- List of towns and villages in County Kerry
