= Castlecove =

Village in County Kerry, Ireland

Castlecove An Siopa Dubh
- Village
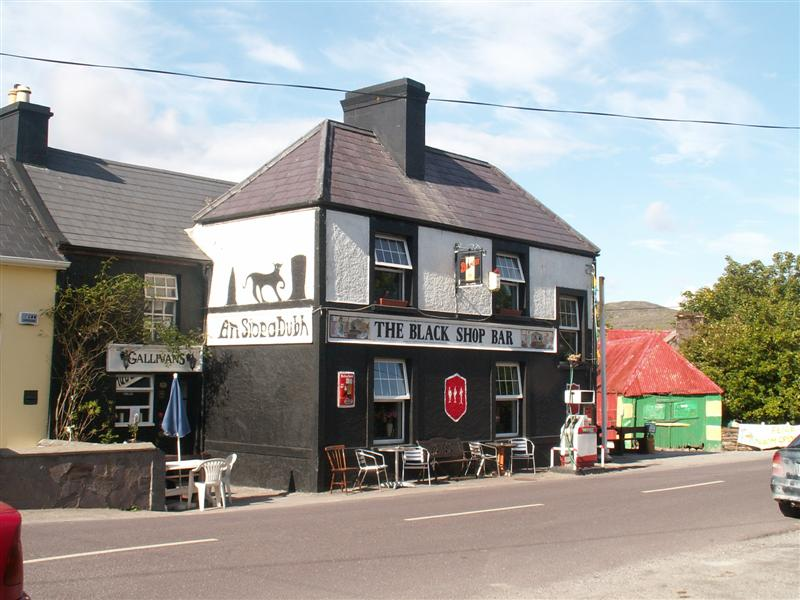
- A pub (An Siopa Dubh) in Castlecove

- Location in Ireland
- Coordinates: 51°46′46″N 10°02′11″W
- Country: Ireland
- Province: Munster
- County: County Kerry
- Time zone: UTC+0 (WET)
  - Summer (DST): UTC-1 (IST (WEST))
- Irish Grid Reference: V592605

Castlecove (Irish: Cuan an Chaisleáin or An Siopa Dubh) is a village in County Kerry, Ireland, located on the Iveragh peninsula on the N70 road which forms part of the Ring of Kerry. It is situated on the southwestern side of the peninsula.

While "Castlecove" is literally translated, in Irish, as Cuan an Chaisleáin, the officially recognised Irish name of the village is An Siopa Dubh. An Siopa Dubh, which translates to "The Black Shop", is the name of a pub and shop in Castlecove. Historic Ordnance Survey maps, dating from 1897-1913, label the village as Blackshop.

== See also ==
- List of towns and villages in Ireland
