= Killelton Church =

- Cill Eiltín
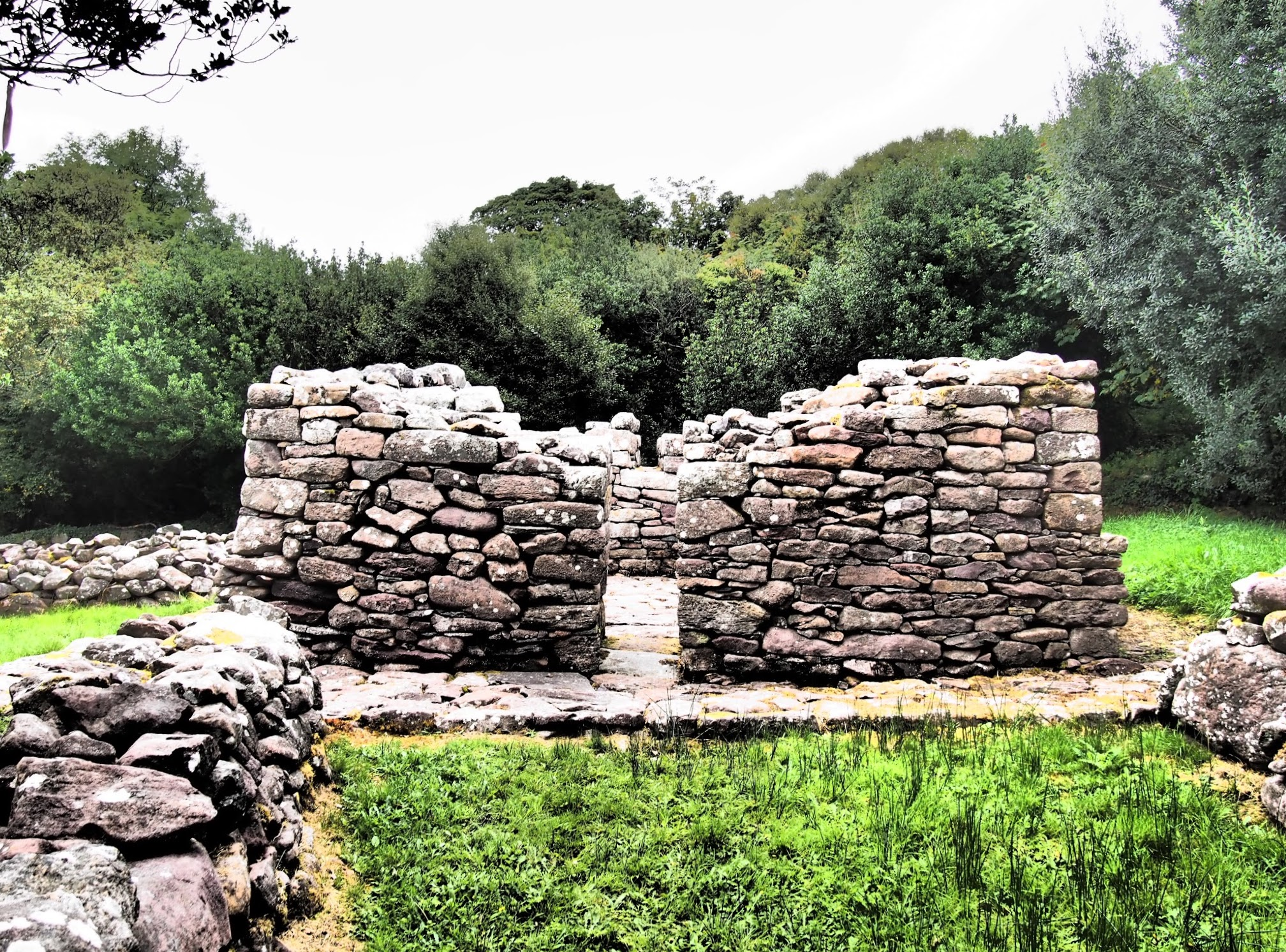
- Killelton Church

- Location within Ireland
- 52.228096°N 9.873677°W
- Location: Killelton, Camp, County Kerry
- Country: Ireland
- Denomination: Catholic (pre-Reformation)

History
- Dedication: Saint Eltan

Architecture
- Functional status: ruined
- Style: Romanesque
- Years built: 9th/10th century AD

Specifications
- Length: 5 m (16 ft)
- Width: 3.5 m (11 ft)
- Materials: stone, clay, mortar

Administration
- Diocese: Ardfert and Aghadoe
Designations
National monument of Ireland
- Official name: Killelton Church
- Reference no.: 593

Killelton Church is a medieval church and a National Monument in County Kerry, Ireland.

== Location ==
Killelton Church is 2.5 kilometres (1.6 mi) east-northeast of Camp, County Kerry, lying to the south of the N86 road.

== History ==
St Eltan founded the church here. The stone structure is dated to the 9th/10th century AD.

Restoration took place in 1984, and a holed stone was found, similar to those at Gallarus.

== Description ==
Killelton is an oratory with a rectangular enclosure, two rectangular buildings and a bullaun.

There is a plinth at the bottom of the north and south walls, a feature characteristic of many early oratories.

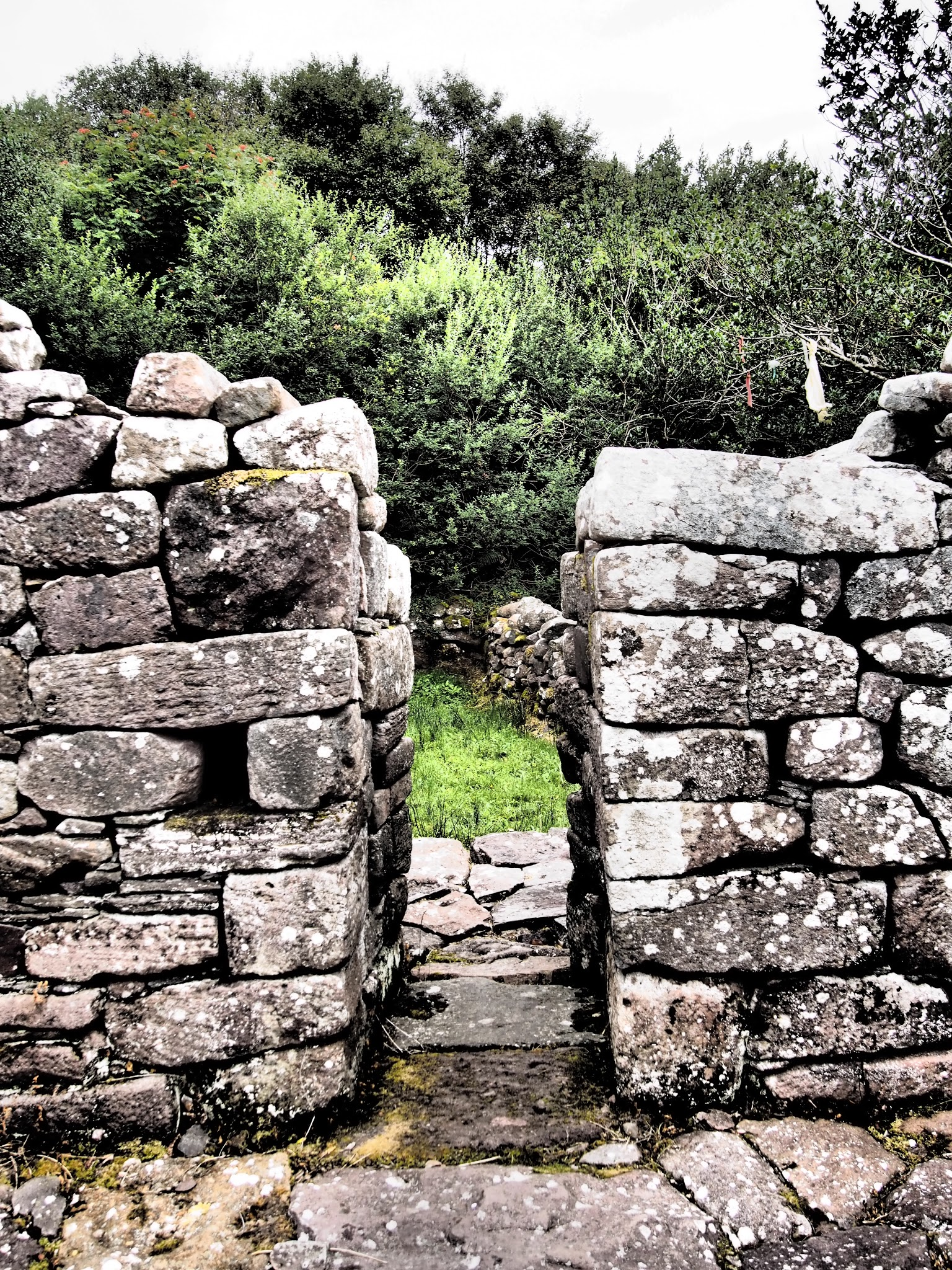
West doorway

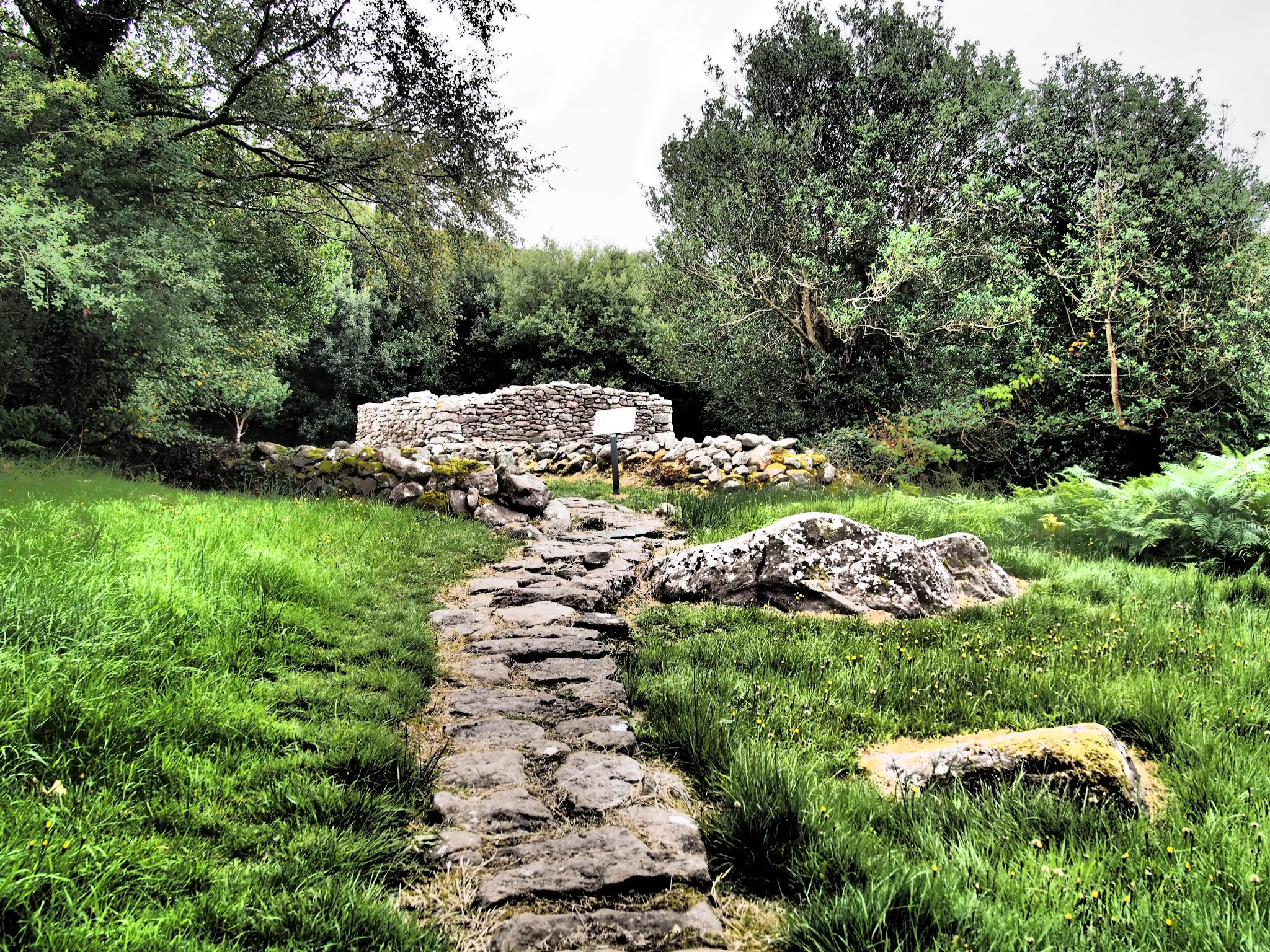
Stone pathway to the church

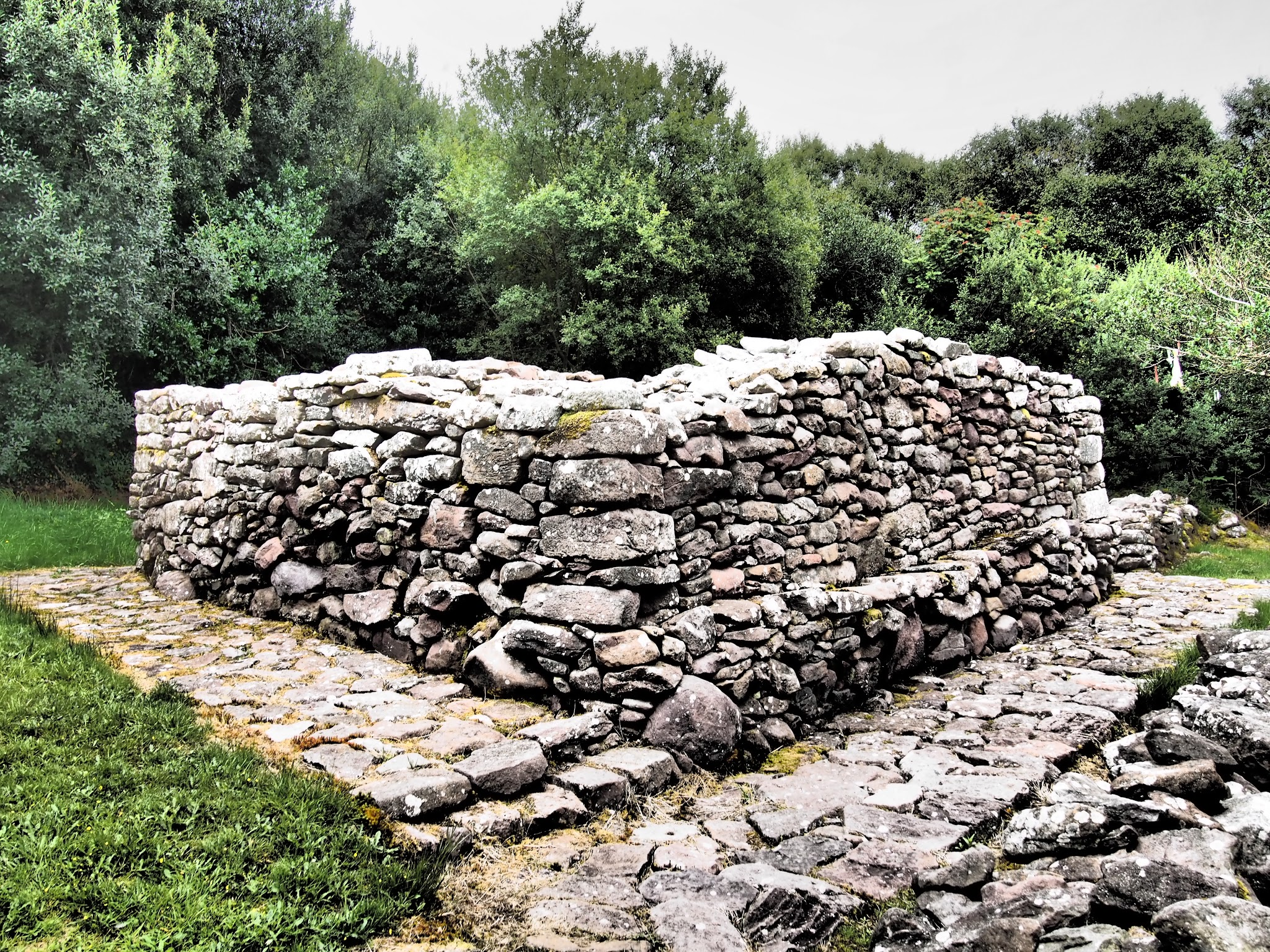
Northeast view of the exterior

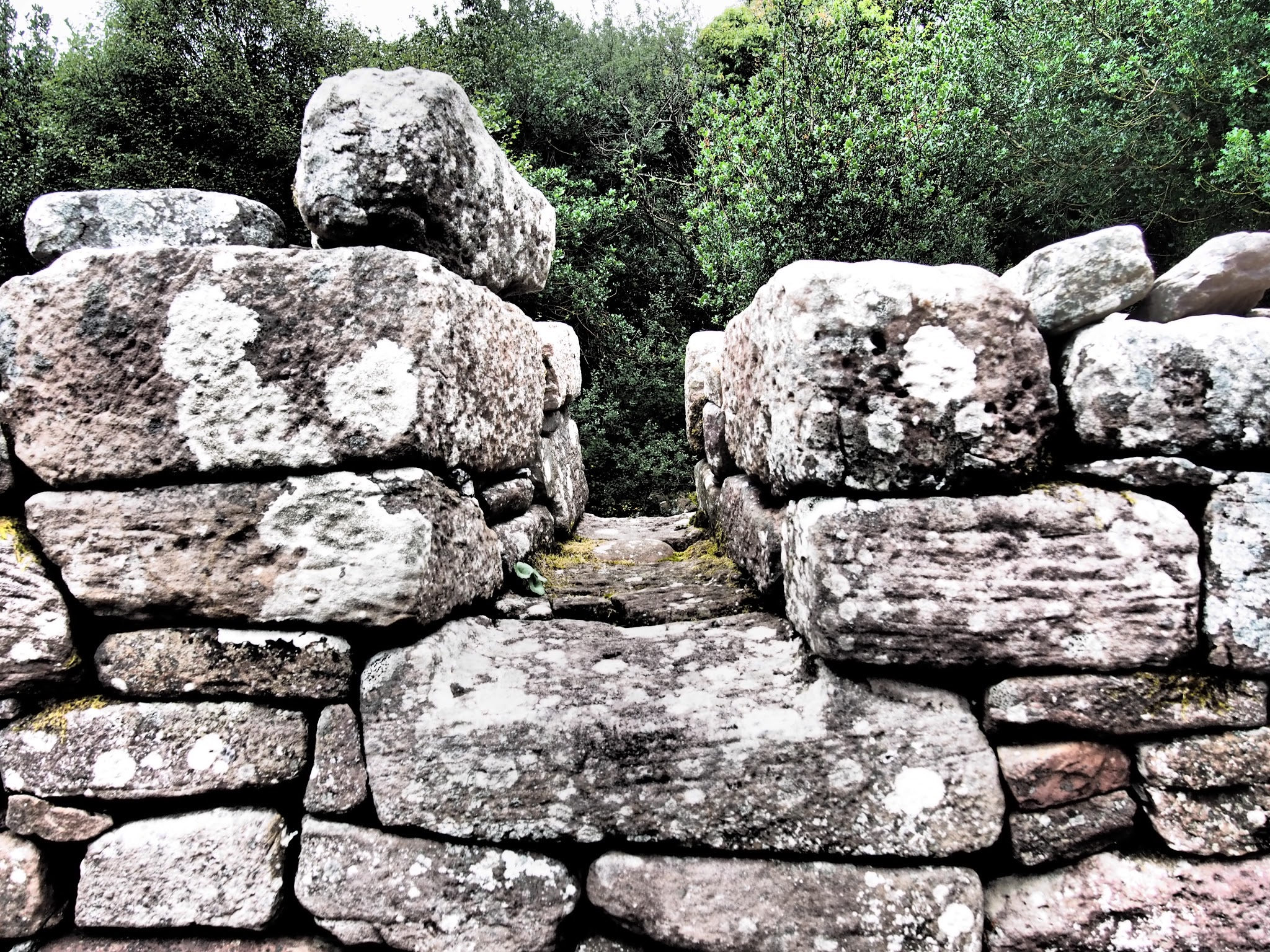
A window
