= Kathleen O'Connell =

Irish republican activist, secretary to Éamon de Valera

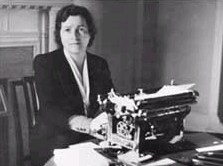
- seated at a typewriter in the Piccadilly Hotel London in 1938
- Born: Catherine O'Connell; 5 October 1888; Caherdaniel, County Kerry
- Died: 7 April 1956 (aged 67)
- Occupation: Personal secretary
- Known for: Éamon de Valera's personal secretary

Kathleen O'Connell (5 October 1888 – 7 April 1956) was an Irish republican activist and Éamon de Valera's personal secretary.

== Early life ==
Kathleen O'Connell was born Catherine O'Connell at Caherdaniel, County Kerry on 5 October 1888. She was one of eleven children of farmer John O'Connell and Mary Ann O'Connell (née O'Sullivan). She was educated in County Kerry, and emigrated to Chicago in 1904 where she trained to be a secretary. She left a well-paid commercial job in 1912 to become secretary to the American delegation of the Gaelic League in New York. She worked closely with Thomas Ashe and Diarmuid Lynch on fund-raising and handled their secret IRB correspondence. She returned to Ireland briefly in 1915 to attend the Gaelic League oireachtas and ard fheis, voting in favour of the politicisation of the organisation. During the same visit she brought money and messages to the Irish Volunteers from John Devoy. O'Connell attended the New York Irish Race Convention, going on to work of the Friends of Irish Freedom. In this position she organised and collected for the "victory fund" for Irish independence. She was also a typist for Clann na Gael. After the Easter 1916 Rising, she became a member of Cumann na mBan in the US, raising money for the widows and children of those killed or wounded during the Rising. It was through this work that she became a close friend of Arthur Griffith and his family.

== Work with de Valera ==
Éamon de Valera requested that O'Connell join his "consular staff" on 2 October 1919, to support his tour of America. She worked closely with him during this tour, travelling with him, assisting with speeches and dealing with his private and public correspondence. She was privy to secrets of the independence movement due to handling Harry Boland's correspondence as well. In November 1920, she returned to Ireland with de Valera and went into hiding immediately. From February 1921 she lived at his secret headquarters at Strand Road, living in dangerous condition until a truce was called in the Irish War of Independence. After this she lived with de Valera at Dr Farnan's house at Merrion Square and later in Blackrock. On 22 June 1921, she was arrested with him, and they were both released the next day. O'Connell was a member of the delegation that met Lloyd George in July 1921, and shared de Valera's opposition to the treaty. She joined de Valera and her sister Teresa in Suffolk Street in June 1922 when the Irish Civil War broke out.

When fighting ended in Dublin in July 1922, she traveled south, working closely with Dorothy Macardle, Robert Brennan, and Erskine Childers establishing a publicity department and publishing Poblacht na hÉireann. In September 1922, she returned to Dublin, and went into hiding at 11 Upper Mount Street. She was a loyal follower of de Valera throughout the civil war, and was present at his arrest in Ennis in August 1923. She acted as his messenger and agent during his imprisonment, working with him on an Irish translation of shorthand which they later abandoned. During this time she also worked for the Sinn Féin TD for Mayo North P. J. Ruttledge.

O'Connell was present at the first meeting of the provisional organising committee of de Valera's new political party, Fianna Fáil. During this time she continued to travel with de Valera, nationally and internationally. There were rumours regarding the nature of their relationship, leading to de Valera vehemently denying any impropriety in Dáil Éireann in 1928. The letter between O'Connell and de Valera's wife, Sinéad, are cited as evidence there was no intimate relationship between O'Connell and de Valera. She resigned from her permanent civil service position of personal secretary to the Taoiseach when de Valera was defeated in 1948, returning in 1951 when he regained power. For her involvement in the War of Independence, O'Connell was awarded an Irish military pension.

== Death and legacy ==
O'Connell was forced to retire in 1954 as she had developed cancer. Her niece, Maire O'Kelly, took up her position. She died on 7 April 1956, and is buried in Glasnevin Cemetery. Her funeral was attended by a guard of honour from the national executive of Fianna Fáil and the Old IRA. She received full military honours and Seán MacEntee delivered the panegyric. During the writing of their biography of de Valera, Lord Longford and Thomas P. O'Neill used her papers, which are held in the University College Dublin archives, extensively.

In 2016, a plaque was unveiled to O'Connell at her birthplace in Caherdaniel by Eamon Ó Cuív, de Valera's grandson.
