= Knightstown, County Kerry =

Village on Valentia Island, County Kerry, Ireland

Knightstown Irish: Baile an Ridire / An Chois
- Village
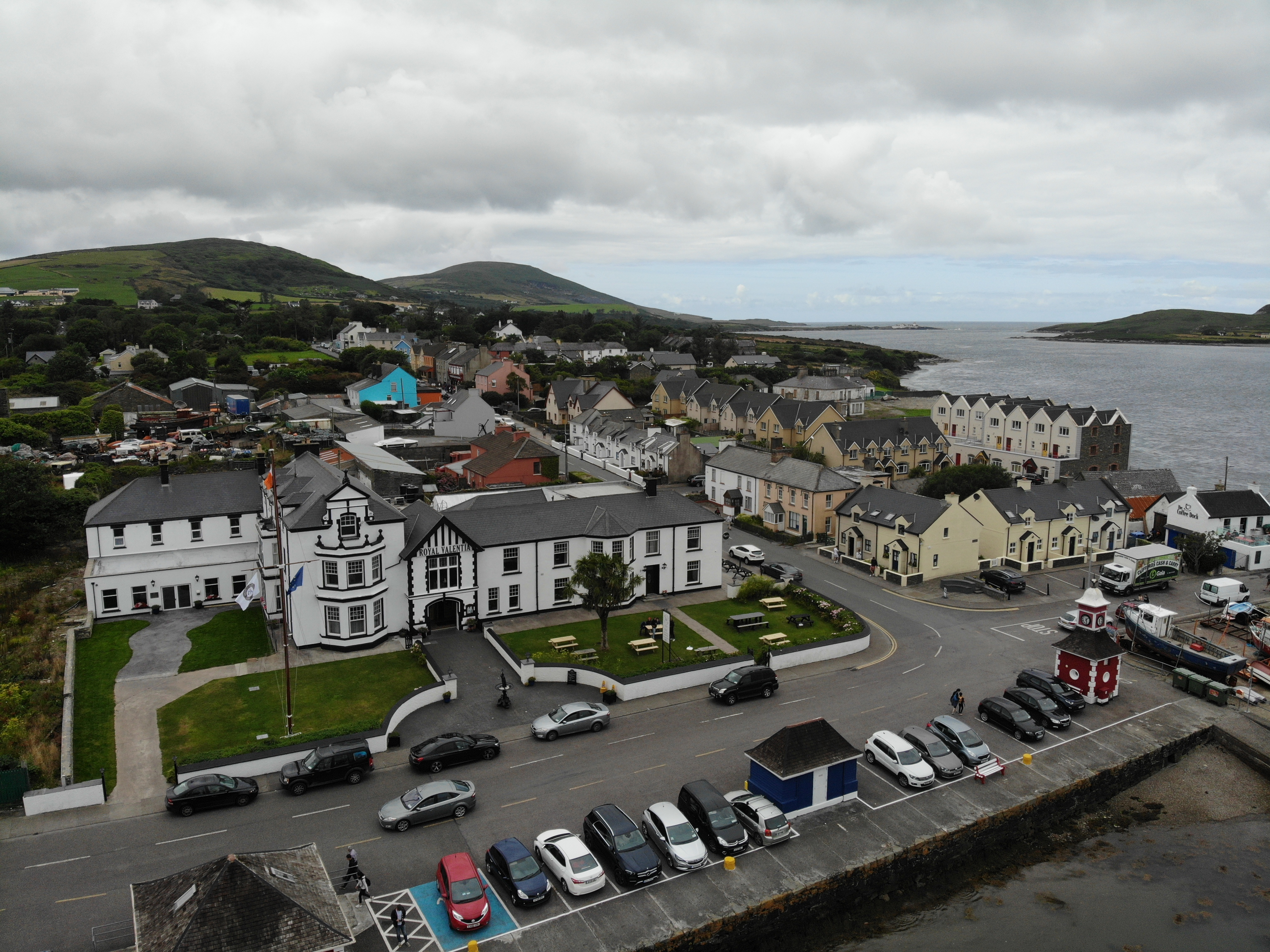
- Knightstown

- Location in Ireland
- Coordinates: 51°55′31″N 10°17′38″W
- Country: Ireland
- Province: Munster
- County: County Kerry

Population (2022)
  - Total: 244
- Time zone: UTC+0 (WET)
  - Summer (DST): UTC-1 (IST (WEST))
- Irish Grid Reference: V422773

Knightstown (Irish: Baile an Ridire, also An Chois), alternatively called Knight's Town, is a village and the largest settlement on Valentia Island, County Kerry, in Ireland. It lies within the townland of Farranreagh, at the eastern tip of the island. As of the CSO census of 2022, Knightstown had a population of 244.

== History ==
In 1830 Maurice FitzGerald, the 18th Knight of Kerry, commissioned Scottish engineer Alexander Nimmo to draw up plans for a new village. During the 1840s, development began on what was initially known as the New Town of Valentia.

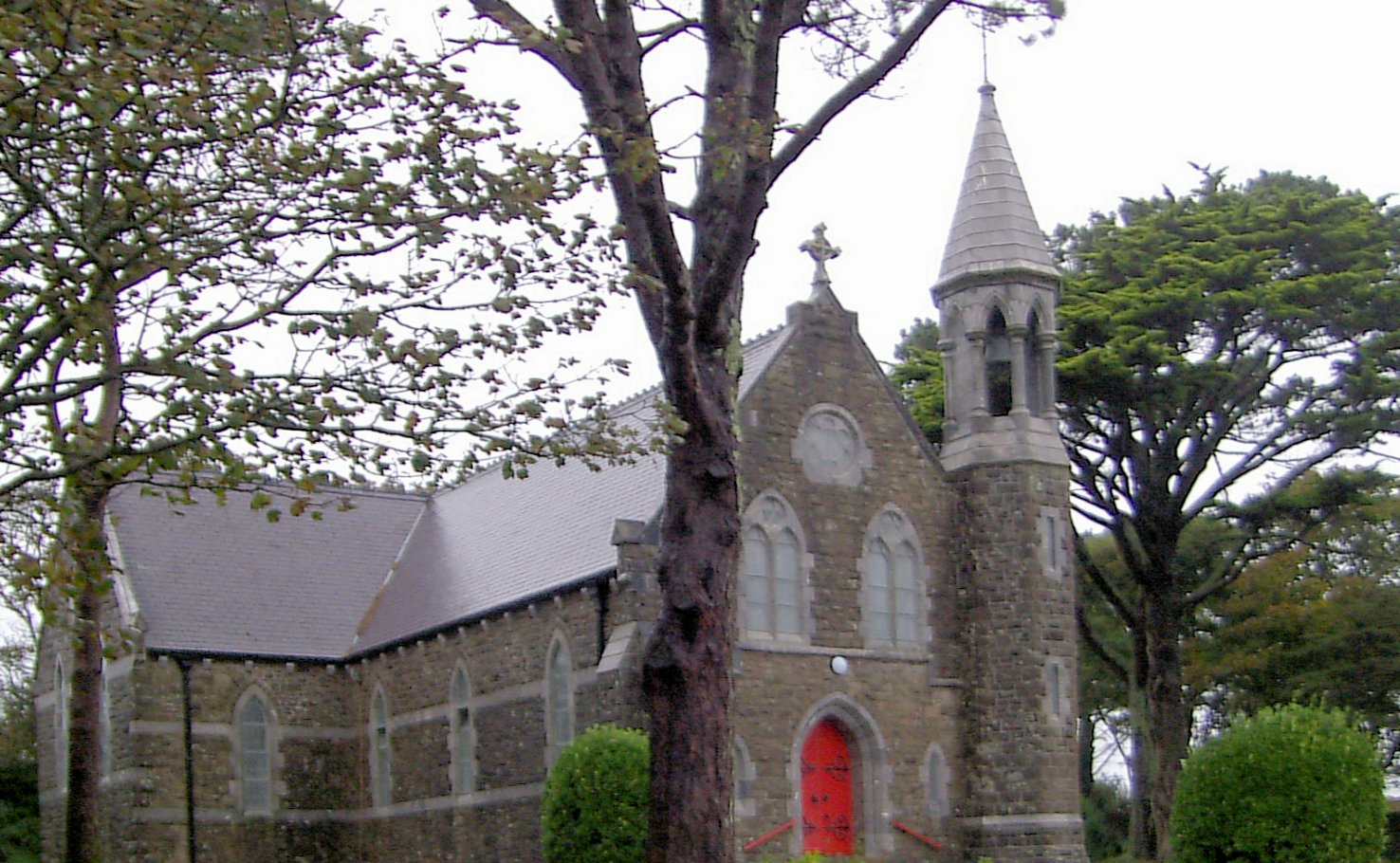
Knightstown Catholic Church

== Locality ==
The local RNLI lifeboat station moved to Knightstown in 1869 from Reenard Point and has since been known as the Valentia Lifeboat Station. There is a selection of local coffee shops and bars in the town, as well as Roman Catholic and Church of Ireland churches.

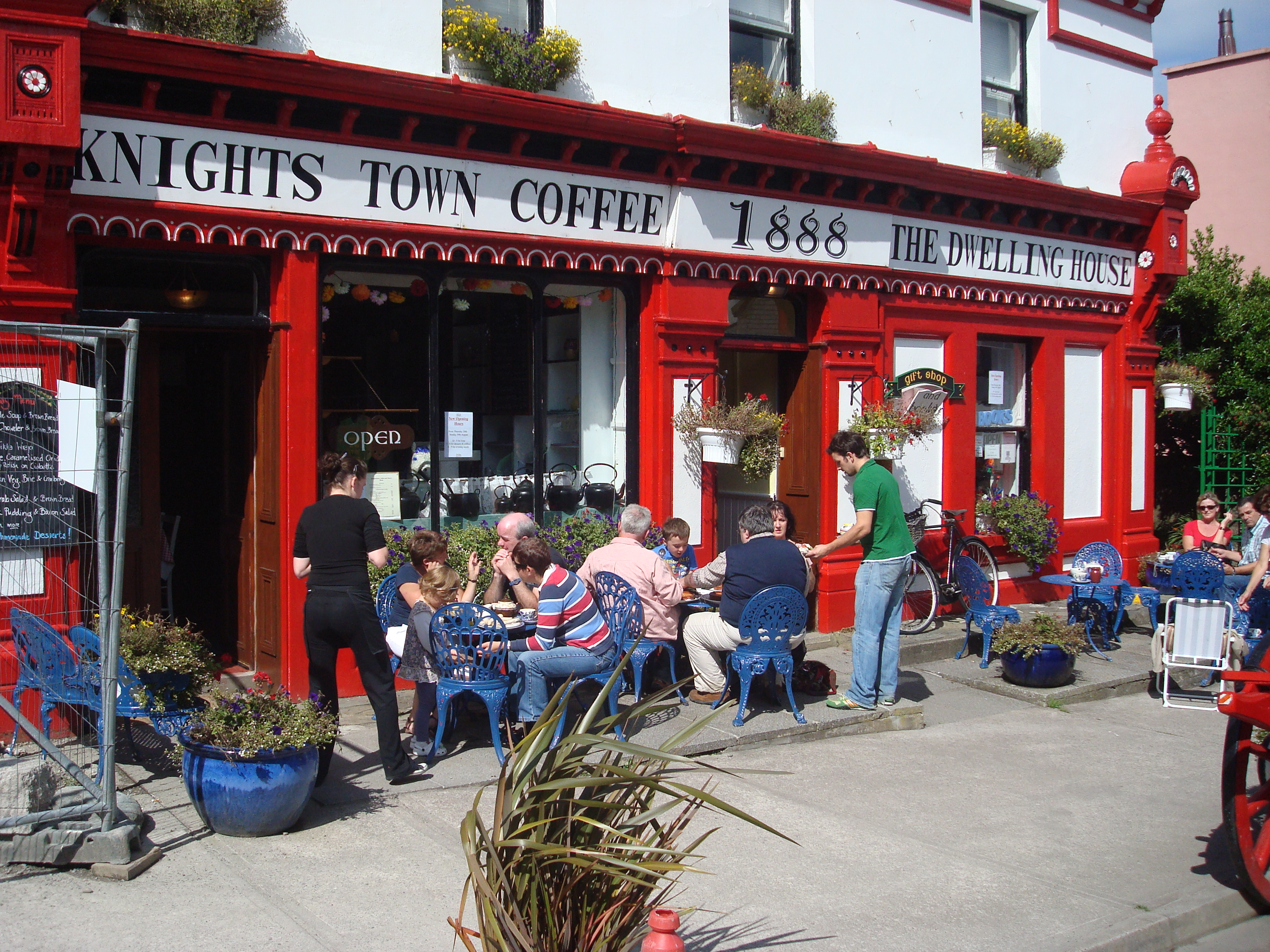
Knightstown Coffee House and bookshop

Knightstown is also the location of the car ferry connection between Valentia Island and Reenard Point on the mainland.

The area served as a base of operations for the laying of the first successful Transatlantic telegraph cable to Heart's Content, completed in 1866. A cable station operated until it was closed in 1966. The history of the transatlantic cable and artifacts can be viewed at the ‘Eighth Wonder’ museum located in the original cable office buildings in Knightstown.

Additionally, The local heritage centre contains numerous displays on the history and heritage of Knightstown and Valentia as a whole.

Knightstown participates in the annual "Tidy Towns" competition where it is regularly recognized for the quality and cleanliness of its environment.

== See also ==
- R565 road (Ireland) which runs through Knightstown to the ferry
- List of towns and villages in Ireland
- List of RNLI stations
