= Caherdaniel =

Village on the Ring of Kerry, Ireland

Caherdaniel Cathair Dónall
- Village
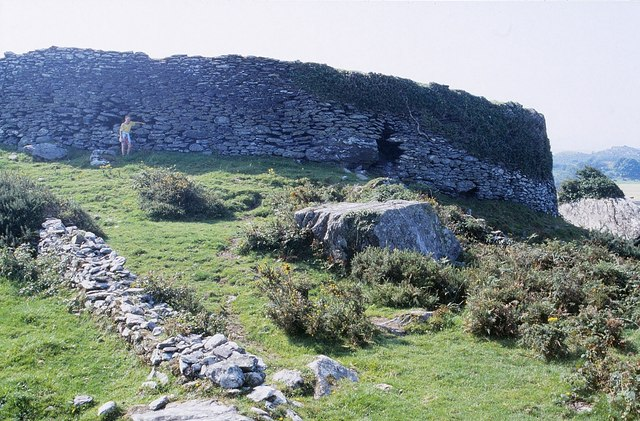
- Cathair Dónall (Caherdaniel) Ring Fort

- Location in Ireland
- Coordinates: 51°46′10″N 10°05′59″W
- Country: Ireland
- Province: Munster
- County: County Kerry
- Irish grid reference: V548593

Caherdaniel (Irish: Cathair Dónall, meaning 'Dónall's stone ringfort') is a village and townland in County Kerry, Ireland, located on the Iveragh peninsula on the Ring of Kerry. It is on the southwestern side of the peninsula, facing onto Derrynane Bay, at a T-junction on the N70 road.

Staigue fort, a stone ringfort (cathair in Irish), is nearby. Derrynane House, which was home to Daniel O'Connell, is also in the area. Copper ore was previously mined in Caherdaniel, the first mines dating back to about 2000 BC.

== Notable people ==
- Gobnait Ní Bhruadair (1861–1955), republican activist
- Kathleen O'Connell (1888–1956), republican activist and Éamon de Valera's personal secretary
- Pat Quinlan (1919–1997), Irish Army officer

== See also ==
- List of towns and villages in Ireland
