= Iveragh Peninsula =

Peninsula in County Kerry, Ireland

Coordinates: 51°53′46″N 10°01′44″W

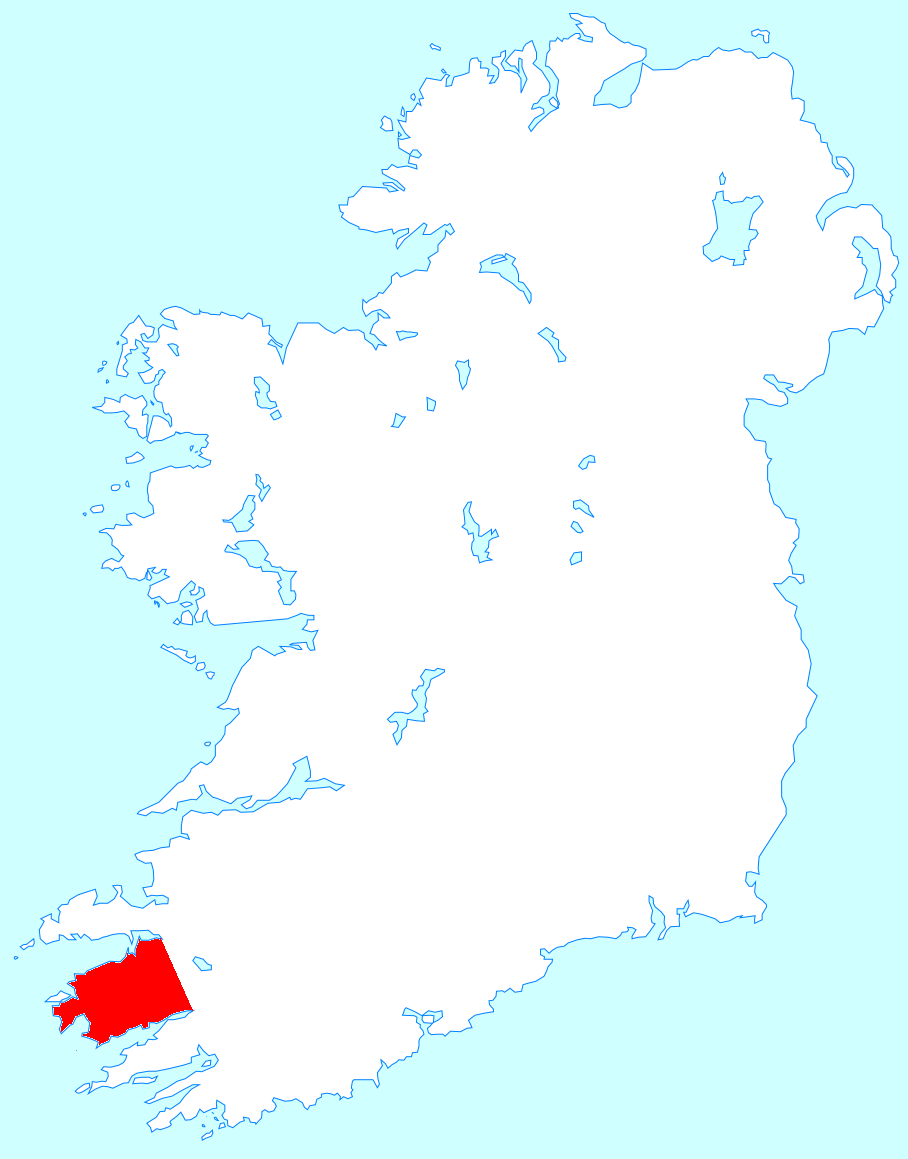
Location map of the Iveragh Peninsula

The Iveragh Peninsula (Irish: Uíbh Ráthach) is located in County Kerry in Ireland. It is the largest peninsula in southwestern Ireland. A mountain range, the MacGillycuddy's Reeks, lies in the centre of the peninsula. Carrauntoohil, its highest mountain, is also the highest peak in Ireland.

== Geography ==
Towns on the peninsula include Killorglin, Cahersiveen, Ballinskelligs, Portmagee, Knightstown, Waterville, Caherdaniel, Sneem and Kenmare.

The Ring of Kerry, a popular tourist trail, circles the coastlines as well as the Skellig Ring, beginning and ending at Killarney, just east of the peninsula.

Valentia Island lies off the northwestern tip of the peninsula. It is connected with the peninsula by a bridge at Portmagee village, but it can also be reached by ferry crossing between Renard Point on the mainland and Knightstown on the island.

The Skellig Islands lie about 12 kilometres (7.5 statute miles or 6.4 nautical miles) off the west coast and are known for their monastic buildings and bird life. Since 2015, the filming of Star Wars has brought many new tourists to the area.

Kerry Geopark is a community initiative on the Iveragh Peninsula which aims to promote geotourism in this area of high geological importance. Some of the interest features are Kenmare Bay (a drowned river valley or ria), signs of past glaciation and volcanic activity and 400-million-year-old fossilised tetrapod tracks.

Cloghanecarhan, a ringfort with ogham stone, is a National Monument; as is Leacanabuaile, a stone ringfort (cashel).

Loher Cashel, a stone ringfort (caiseal) is located at the western edge of Iveragh.

The Iveragh Peninsula has also been home to the Kerry International Dark-Sky Reserve since 2014.

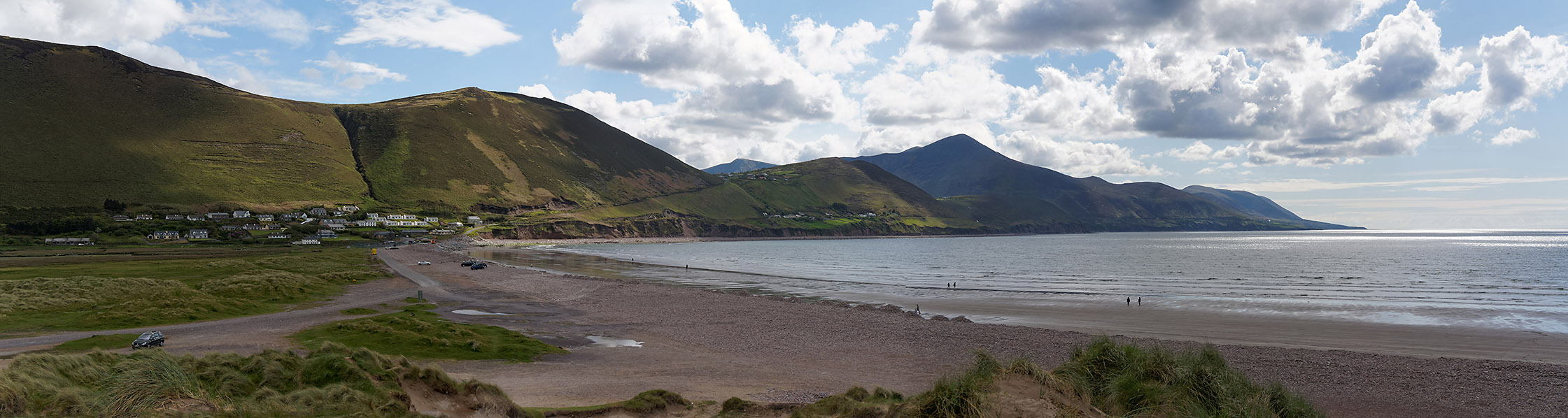
Beach at Rossbeigh in the Dingle Bay

== Gaeltacht ==
The Iveragh Gaeltacht or Gaeltacht Uíbh Ráthaigh is one of the smallest of the Gaeltachts. The main town is Baile an Sceilg and smaller villages and townlands include Dún Géagáin, Cíllin Liath, Lóthar and Cuan an Chaisleáin. It is sparsely populated and According to the 2016 Census, there were 1,753 people over the age of three living in the Iveragh Gaeltacht, with only 6.9% claiming to speak Irish on a daily basis outside the education system. This makes it the 5th weakest Gaeltacht out of 26 in Ireland by rate of daily speakers.

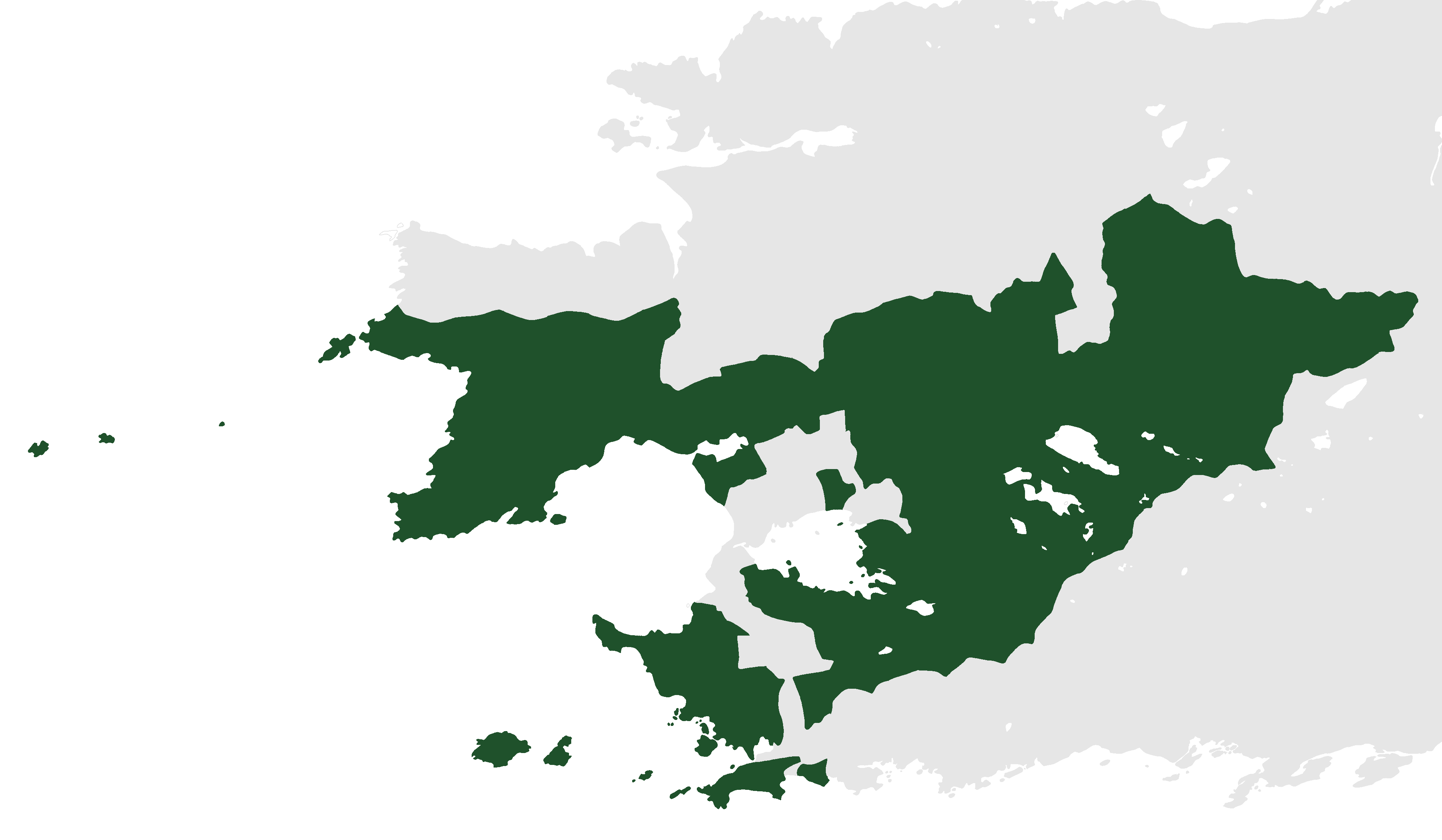
The Gaeltacht region of the Iveragh peninsula, highlighted in green.

The Iveragh Gaeltacht was one of the strongest in the country at one point. People of all classes spoke the language, with over 93% of the population monolingual Irish speakers in the 1850s. The entire Peninsula was designated as a Gaeltacht when they were first drawn in the 1920s. By the 1980s the percentage of people able to speak Irish in the official Gaeltacht area that was drawn in 1956 was around 60% and has remained at about that level ever since.

A comprehensive linguistic study of the Gaeltachts published in 2007 recommended that the Iveragh Gaeltacht be categorized as a class C Gaeltacht.

The percentage of daily speakers along with the population have been falling consistently. Between 1956 and 2011 the population of the Iveragh Gaeltacht declined from 3,036 to 1,795. A decrease of 41%. This is despite a 67% increase of the Irish population in that same timeframe. Many of the townlands in the centre of the peninsula where much of the Gaeltacht is located are uninhabitated. The lack of basic services is cited as one of the main reasons for the dramatic decline in population and by extension the Irish-speaking population. The lack of many Gaelscoileanna in the area is probably another reason for the decline of the Irish language.

"Comhchoiste Ghaeltacht Uíbh Ráthaigh" is a community group established in 1998 to act as an umbrella for the development groups in the five Gaeltacht areas on the Iveragh Peninsula. The organisation is involved in many things including promoting the Irish language and developing community projects.

== Prehistoric rock art ==
The Iveragh Peninsula is host to one of the highest concentrations of Atlantic rock art in Ireland. The art is scattered throughout the peninsula but the greatest prevalence is found in two main clusters, the most notable and well recorded being the adjoining townlands of Derrynablaha and Derreeny near Sneem. The art of these townlands attracted international attention in the 1960’s when Professor Emanuel Anati recorded the art, alongside E. Shee and M.J O’ Kelly. The second cluster of rock art is on the adjoining townlands of Coomasaharn, Kealduff Upper and Letter West, near Glenbeigh. These townlands are host to hundreds of individual examples of the Atlantic art form, with new examples being added to the archaeological record regularly by archaeologists and enthusiasts.

== Local residents ==
- Pádraig Ó hÉigeartaigh, Irish language poet, (1871–1936)
- Tomás Rua Ó Súilleabháin, Irish language poet (1785–1848)

== See also ==
- Beara Peninsula
- Coom Wedge Tomb
- Corcu Duibne
- Dingle Peninsula
- Kerry Way
- Valentia Harbour railway station
