= N70 road (Ireland) =

Road in Ireland

N70 road
- Bóthar N70

Route information
- Length: 141.691 km (88.043 mi)

Location
- Country: Ireland
- Primary destinations: (bypassed routes in italics): County Kerry; Kenmare; Caherciveen; Killorglin; Tralee - terminates at Camp on the N22/N69 Tralee Bypass

Highway system
- Roads in Ireland; Motorways; Primary; Secondary; Regional

The N70 road is a national secondary road in Ireland. It comprises most of the Ring of Kerry.

== Route ==
(N70 Killarney Road at Kenmare) – Sneem – Castlecove – Caherdaniel – Waterville – Cahersiveen – Killorglin – (N72) – Milltown – Castlemaine – (N86) – Tralee (At Camp on N22/N69 Tralee Bypass) .

== Quality of road ==
N70 is mostly of poor quality single carriageway road, with many sections are bending or narrow especially from Castlemaine to Tralee and also from Waterville to Kenmare.

== Upgrade and Improvement ==
- In 2013, a new 750m of dual carriageway near Tralee was opening joining at roundabout at N22, as part of new 8 km dual carriageway east Tralee bypass which also joined N21 and N69.
- In 2019, a new 3.5 km road between Milltown and Killorglin was opened. The new road is widened with a climbing lane. It replaced the dangerous bends on old section from Knockavota to Tinnahally.

== See also ==
- Roads in Ireland
- Motorways in Ireland
- National primary road
- Regional road
