= Portmagee =

Coastal village in County Kerry, Ireland

Portmagee Irish: An Caladh
- Village
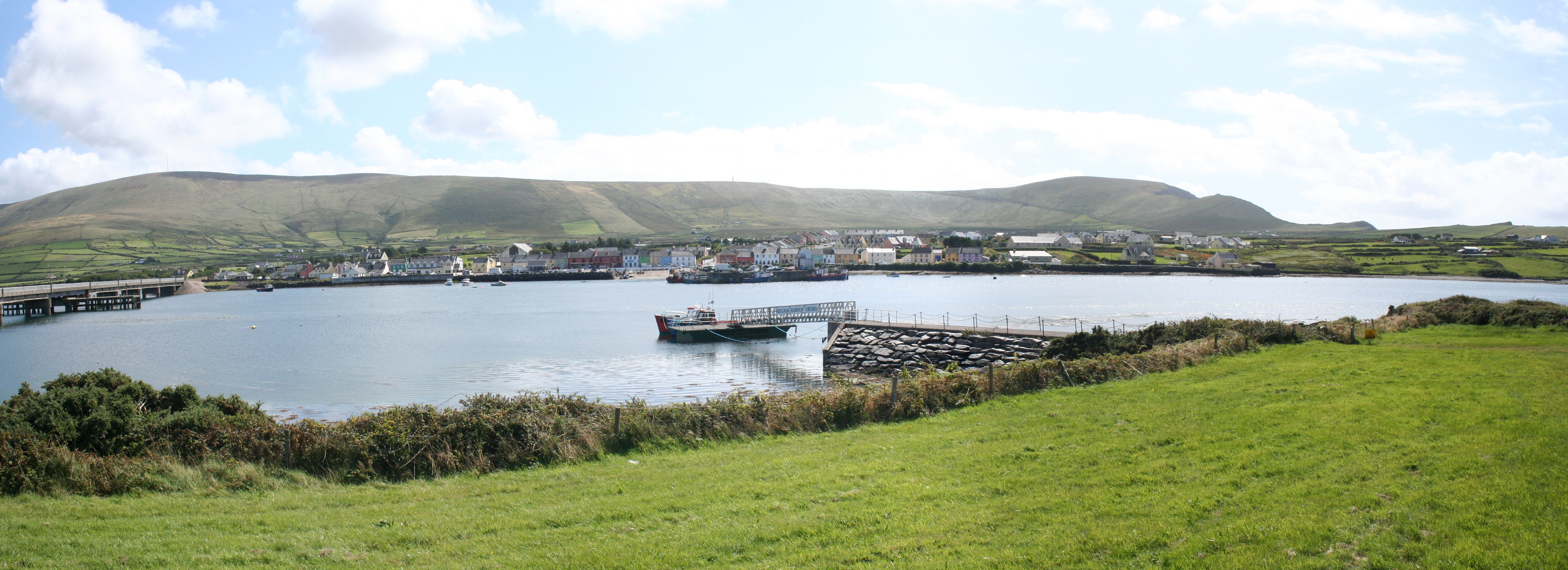

- Location in Ireland
- Coordinates: 51°53′08″N 10°21′58″W
- Country: Ireland
- Province: Munster
- County: County Kerry

Population (2022)
  - Total: 116
- Time zone: UTC+0 (WET)
  - Summer (DST): UTC-1 (IST (WEST))
- Irish Grid Reference: V370730

Portmagee (Irish: An Caladh, meaning 'the ferry') is a village in County Kerry, Ireland. The village is located on the Iveragh peninsula south of Valentia Island. It is known locally as 'the ferry', in reference to its purpose as a crossing point to the island. Access to Valentia Island is now via the Maurice O'Neill Memorial Bridge (R565 road) from Portmagee, which was built in 1970 and named in memory of a member of the IRA executed in 1942 for his part in the shooting dead of Detective George Mordaunt in Dublin.

== Name ==
The name Portmagee (Port Magee and Magee's Port as it was formerly known) comes from Captain Theobald Magee, a notorious 18th-century smuggler. Having served in the army of King James as an officer, Magee 'retired' to a life of merchant shipping between France, Portugal and Ireland. Thanks to the many inlets around the South West coast, his trade in contraband spirits, textiles and tea and tobacco was hard to police and therefore very profitable. He married Bridget Morgell, the widow of a rich Dingle merchant and also the daughter of the then representative for Dingle, Thomas Crosbie. There is some suspicion that Magee's death in a Lisbon monastery was due to some exile imposed by Crosbie, an influential MP. However, his wife and sons continued the family business of smuggling.

== Tourism ==
In December 2012, Portmagee was awarded the Fáilte Ireland National Tourism Town Award, the first town to be awarded the accolade.

== Places of interest ==
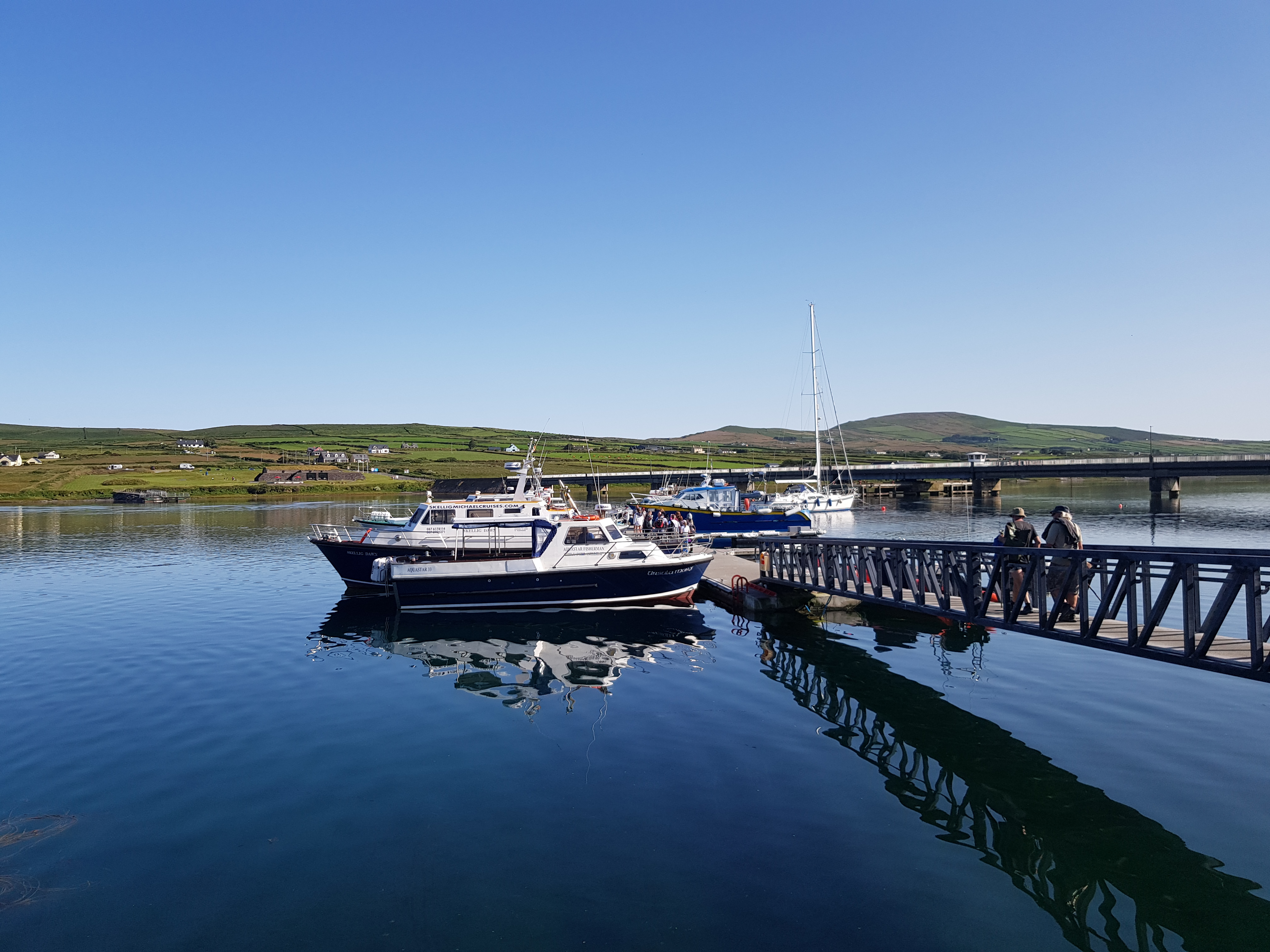
Portmagee Pier

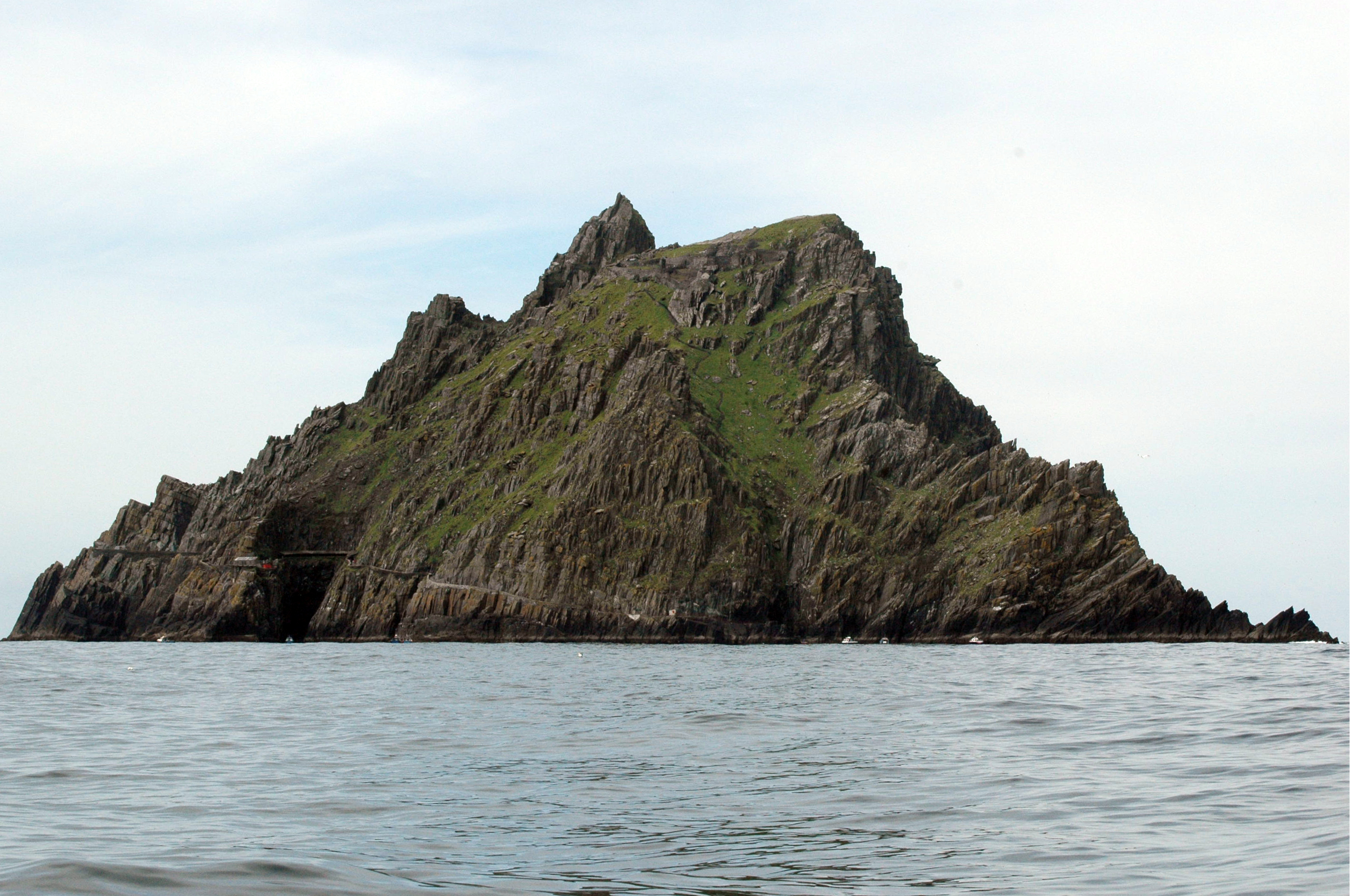
Great Skellig

The village serves as a departure point for tourists travelling to visit 'Skellig Michael', an island off the coast featuring a 6th-century monastic settlement. Skellig Michael (from Sceilig Mhichíl in the Irish language, meaning Michael's rock), also known as Great Skellig, is a steep rocky island in the Atlantic Ocean about 9 miles (14 kilometres) from the coast of County Kerry. It is the larger of the two Skellig Islands. Probably founded in the 7th century, the island remained a centre of monastic life for Irish Christian monks for 600 years. The Gaelic monastery, which is situated almost at the summit of the 230-metre-high rock, became a UNESCO World Heritage Site in 1996. It is one of Europe's better-known but least accessible monastic sites. Since the extreme remoteness of Skellig Michael has, until recently, discouraged visitors, the site remains exceptionally well-preserved. The very spartan conditions inside the monastery illustrate the ascetic lifestyle practiced by early Irish Christians. The monks lived in stone 'beehive' huts (clochans), perched above nearly vertical cliff walls.

Another monastery, Illaunloughan, is located in the Portmagee Channel north of the town.

South of the town are the popular Kerry Cliffs.

== Traditions ==
The main street in Portmagee

The "Old Year" celebrations originated in 1727 when a ship's crew arrived in Portmagee from Nantes during a heavy winter storm three days after Christmas. Some days later, the locals heard a deafening screech emanating from the end of the pier. The locals tentatively gathered to watch, assuming it to be a Banshee, but discovered the crew of the French ship carrying torches on a procession through the village. An old, ragged man was at the centre, wobbling up the street. He fell three times, mirroring Christ's walk at Calvary, and was helped by members of the procession.

At exactly midnight, a shot rang out, and the old man fell for the final time. Silence fell until a newly dressed man clad in white and a top hat leapt out of the darkness, and the music started up playing livelier. The procession began once again as the new man shook hands and gave kisses to the locals. He then gave a speech explaining that the old man represented the year just gone by and the new man symbolised all that was new as the year began.

The tradition has been commemorated every year in the village on New Year's Eve.

== Skellig Rangers ==
The local GAA team, Skellig Rangers, was founded in 1895 (originally as Portmagee G.A.A, before adopting its present name in the 1930s), and plays at Pairc Chill Imeallach in Portmagee.

== See also ==
- List of towns and villages in Ireland
