= The Black Valley =

Valley in Kerry, Ireland

- Cummeenduff
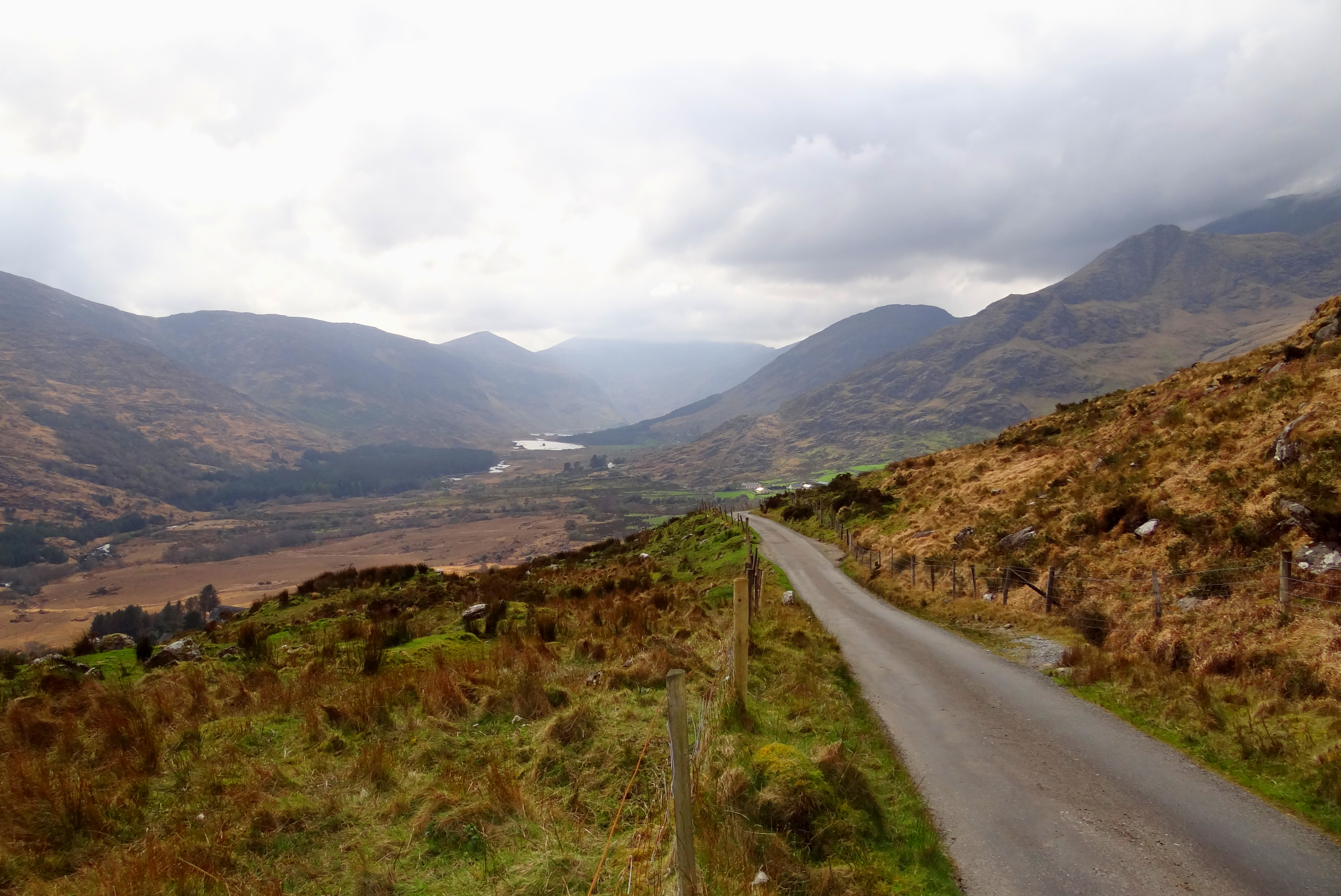
- Looking westwards into The Black Valley from the Head of the Gap of Dunloe
- Length: 7 miles (11 km) East-West
- Width: 2 to 3 miles (3.2 to 4.8 km)

Geography
- Location: County Kerry, Ireland
- Coordinates: 51.9487°N 9.6465°W
- Mountain range: MacGillycuddy's Reeks
- Traversed by: Derrylea Road
- Rivers: Gearhameen River
- Interactive map of The Black Valley

The Black Valley or Cummeenduff (from Irish Com Uí Dhuibh, meaning 'Black Glen') is a remote valley at the southern end of the MacGillycuddy's Reeks mountain range in County Kerry, Ireland, situated south of the Gap of Dunloe and north of Moll's Gap; it is used as a southerly access into the Gap of Dunloe.

The valley is usually accessed by driving to Moll's Gap and then continuing east on the R568 road until a small side-road (at V853774, labelled "Gearhasallagh" after the townland), descends steeply north into the valley. The Black Valley is part of the Kerry Way, a walkers version of the Ring of Kerry beginning and ending in Killarney, and is also part of a 55–kilometre loop of the Killarney–Gap of Dunloe–Black Valley–Moll's Gap area, popular with cyclists. The Black Valley is also a southerly access route to the Head of the Gap in the Gap of Dunloe, and to Lord Brandon's Cottage. The Black Valley is also noted for being one of the last places in mainland Ireland to be connected to the electricity and telephone networks due to its remoteness, which happened in 1976.

== See also ==
- Gap of Dunloe
- Moll's Gap
- Ladies View
- Torc Waterfall
- Stumpa Dúloigh
