= Ladies View =

Scenic viewpoint in Kerry, Ireland

Coordinates: 51.9674°N 9.5929°W

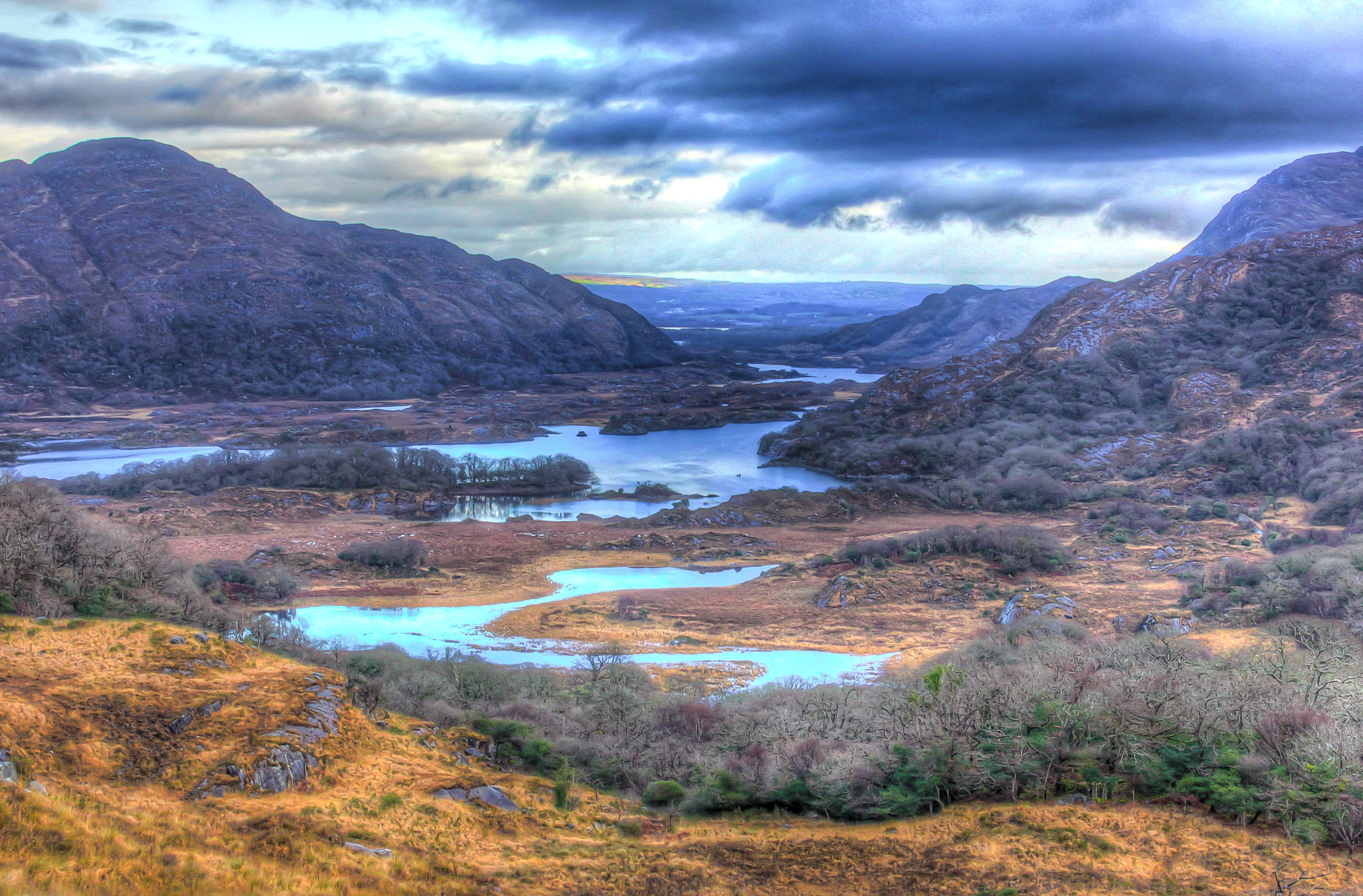
Ladies View, Lakes of Killarney

Ladies View is a scenic viewpoint on the Ring of Kerry tourist route about 19 kilometres (12 miles) from Killarney along the N71 road to Kenmare, in the Killarney National Park in Ireland. The Irish Times ranked Ladies View as one of the most photographed places in Ireland, while the Daily Edge ranked the views amongst Ireland's finest on Instagram. The name Ladies View (sometimes spelt Ladies' View), stems from the admiration of the view given by Queen Victoria's ladies-in-waiting during Victoria's 1861 visit to Ireland. In October 2017, a tourist couple almost drove their rental car over the edge of the cliff and into the valley below.

The main viewpoint has a small car park, and a café.

== Gallery ==
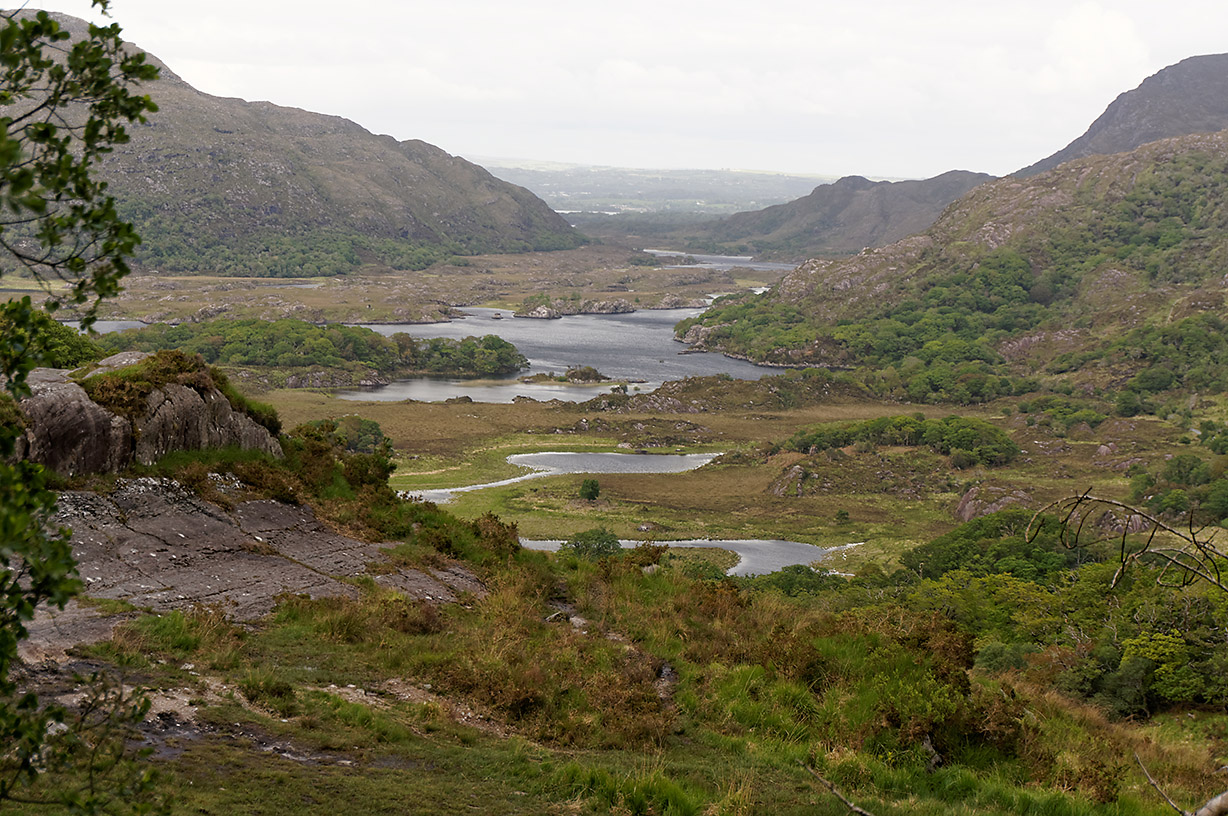
Ladies View in May

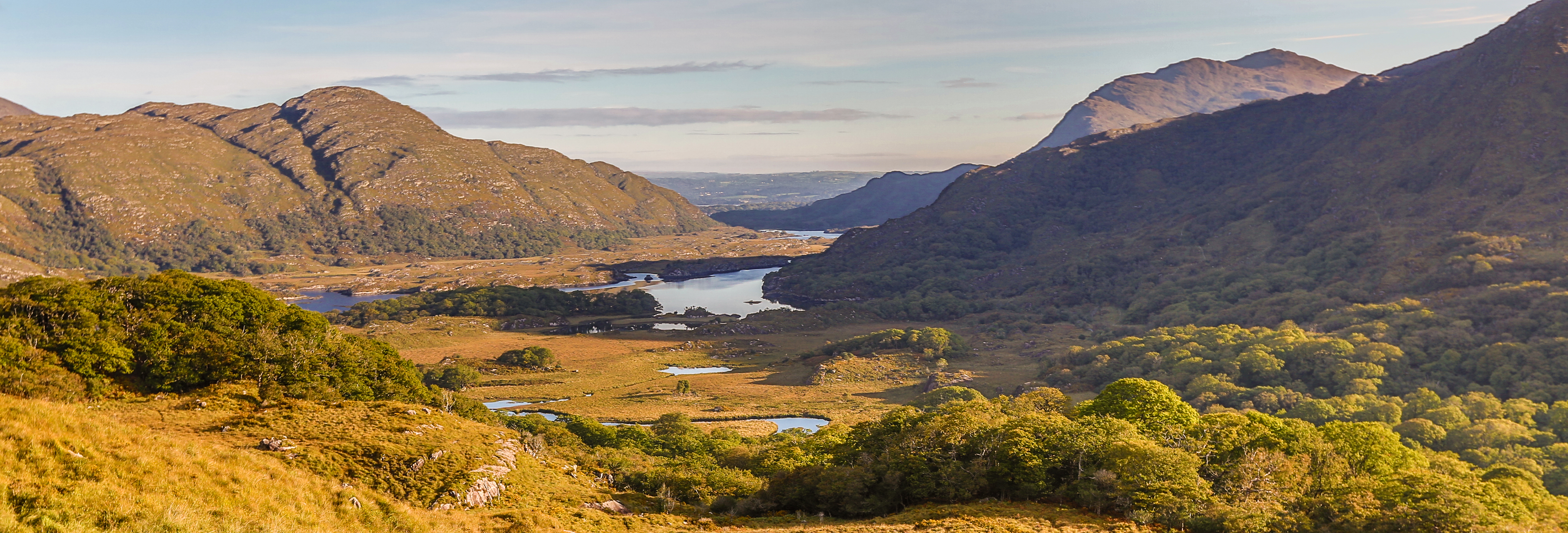
Ladies View in Autumn

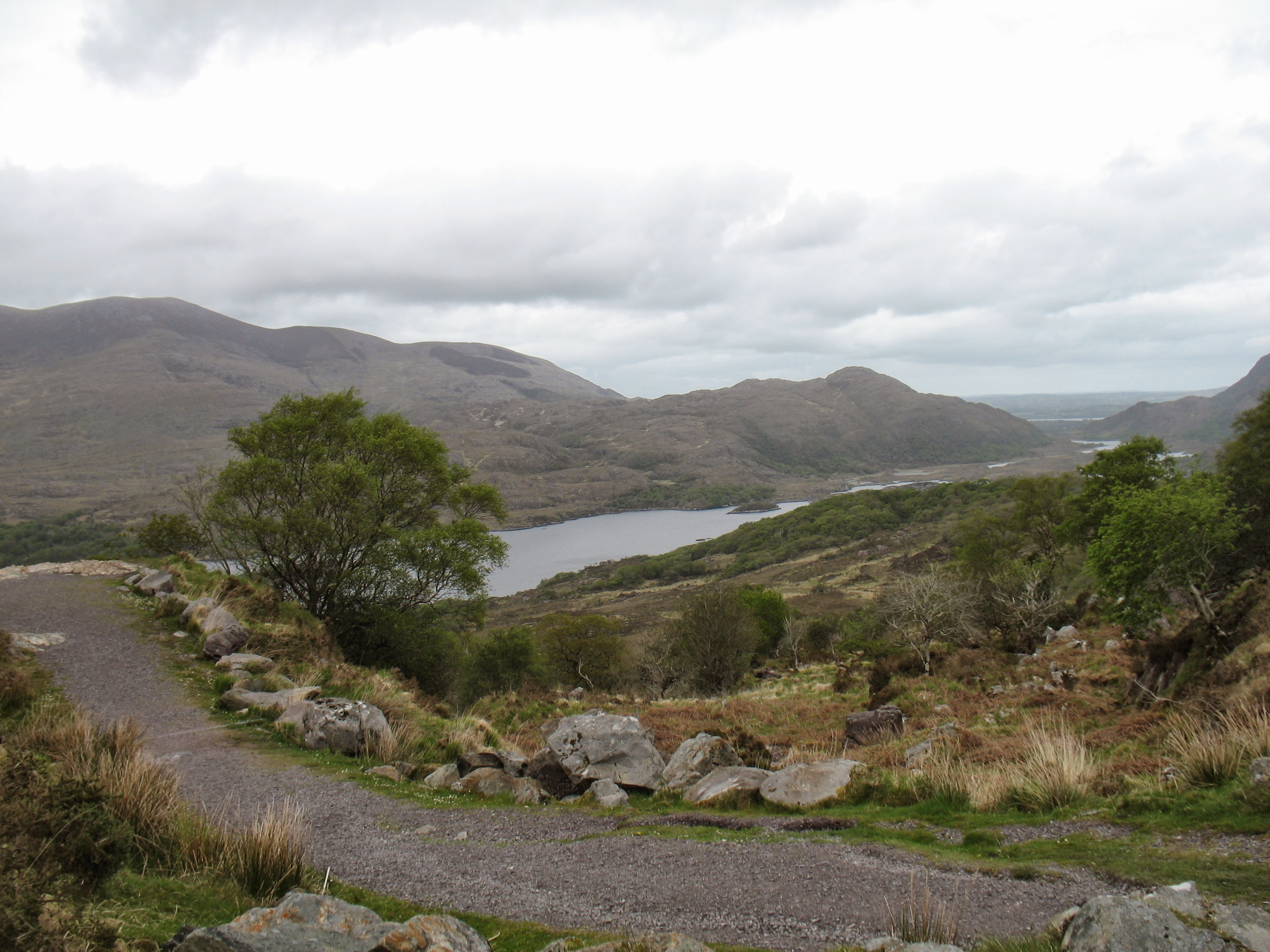
Road around the area

== See also ==
- Black Valley
- Gap of Dunloe
- Moll's Gap
- Torc Waterfall
