= Moll's Gap =

Mountain pass in Kerry, Ireland

- Céim an Daimh
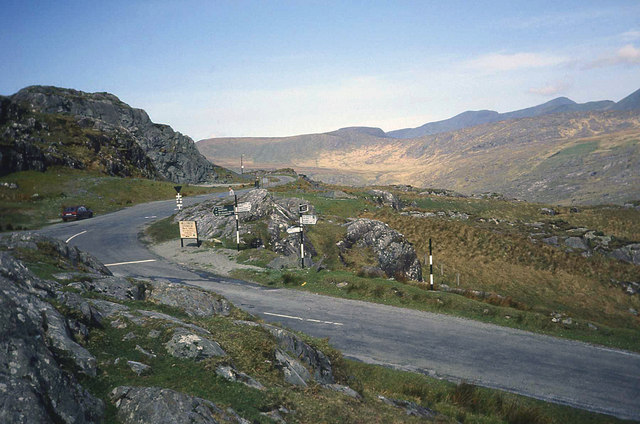
- Moll's Gap

- Location within Ireland
- Elevation: 260 metres (850 feet)
- Traversed by: N71 road

Third Approach
- Location: County Kerry, Ireland
- Range: MacGillycuddy's Reeks
- Coordinates: 51.93818°N 9.657412°W
- Topo map: OSI Discovery 78

Moll's Gap or Céim an Daimh (meaning, Gap of the Ox), is a mountain pass on the N71 road from Kenmare to Killarney in County Kerry, Ireland.

Moll's Gap is on the Ring of Kerry route, and offers views of the MacGillycuddy's Reeks mountains, and is a popular tourist location. The rocks at Moll's gap are formed of Old Red Sandstone, which are small quartz grains laid down over 350 million years ago; unlike most of the Old Red Sandstone around Killarney which is stained red by iron oxide, the rock at Moll's gap is stained green by chlorite. Moll's Gap is named after Moll Kissane, who ran a shebeen (an unlicensed public house) in the 1820s, while the road was under construction.

Like the nearby Gap of Dunloe, Moll's Gap is an example of a "glacial breach", where a 500 metre deep glacier in the Black Valley broke through Moll's Gap 25,000 years ago during Ireland's last ice age.

== See also ==
- Gap of Dunloe
- Black Valley
- Ladies View
