= Purple Mountain (Kerry) =

Mountain in County Kerry, Ireland

Purple Mountain (and Purple Mountain Group)
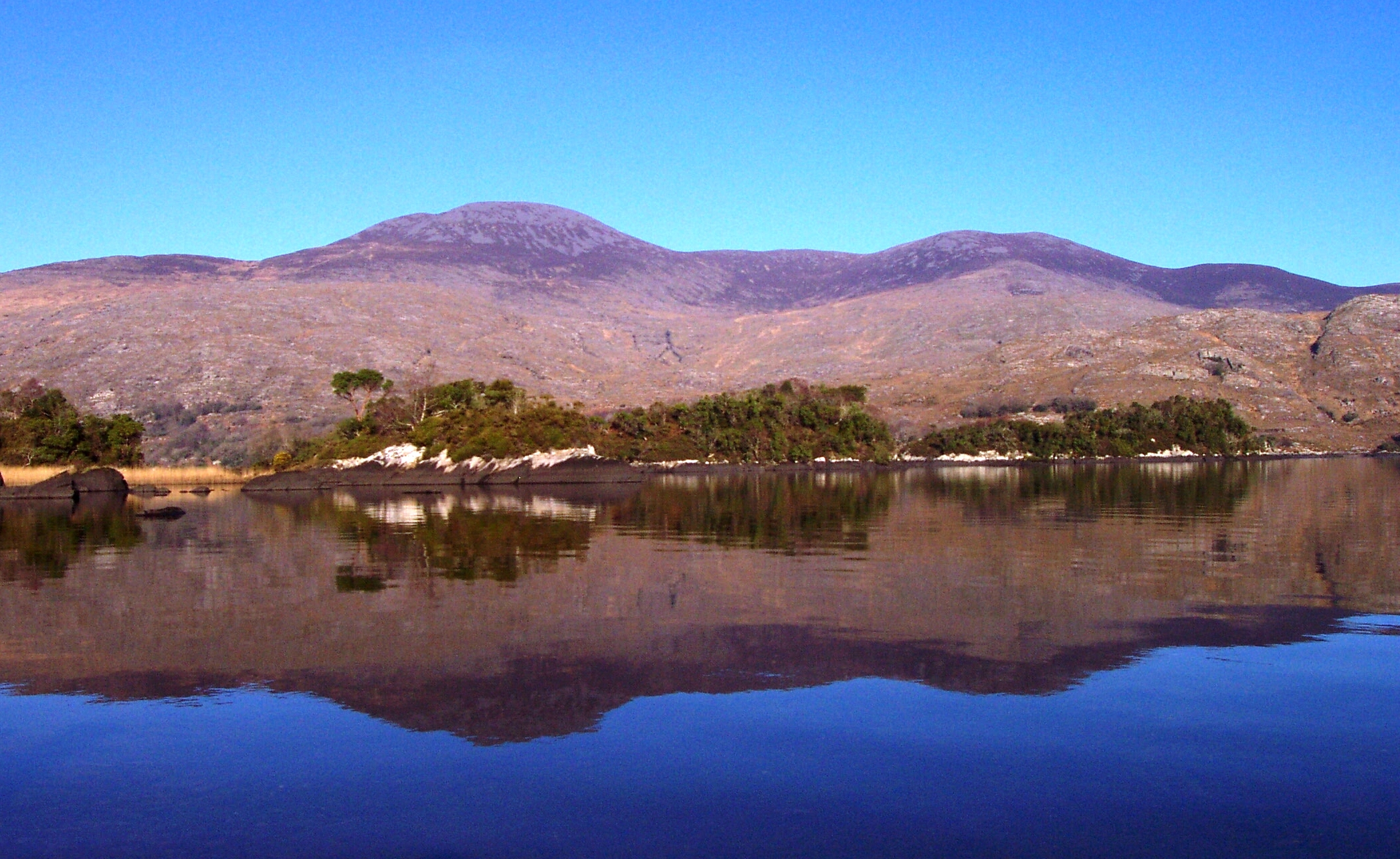
- Purple Mountain from the south with the Killarney Upper Lake in the foreground

Highest point
- Elevation: 832 m (2,730 ft)
- Prominence: 597 m (1,959 ft)
- Listing: Marilyn, Hewitt, Arderin, Simm, Vandeleur-Lynam
- Coordinates: 52°00′28″N 9°37′21″W

Naming
- Native name: An Sliabh Corcra

Geography
- Location within Ireland
- Location: County Kerry, Ireland
- Parent range: Purple Mountain Group
- OSI/OSNI grid: V886851
- Topo map: OSI Discovery 78

Geology
- Rock age: Devonian
- Mountain type(s): Well-bedded grey sandstone, (Lough Acoose Sandstone Formation)

Climbing
- Easiest route: From the Head of the Gap

Purple Mountain (Irish: an Sliabh Corcra) at 832 metres (2,730 ft) high, is the 21st–highest peak in Ireland on the Arderin scale, and the 28th–highest according to the Vandeleur-Lynam scale. It is located in County Kerry, and is the highest point of the Purple Mountain Group.

== Geology ==
Purple Mountain is composed of sandstone particles of various sizes which are collectively known as Old Red Sandstone. Old Red Sandstone has a purple-reddish colour, and has virtually no fossils. The colour gave its name to the mountain group. The composition of Old Red Sandstone is variable and contains quartz stones, mudstones, siltstones, and sandstone particles (boulders of conglomerate rock containing quartz pebbles are visible).

== Geography ==
The Purple Mountain Group is described as a "heather–strewn" massif with five classified peaks at its centre: Purple Mountain 832 metres (2,730 ft), Purple Mountain NE Top 757 metres (2,484 ft) and Shehy Mountain 762 metres (2,500 ft), Tomies Mountain (also called An Chathair) 735 metres (2,411 ft), and Tomies North Top (also called Tomies Rock, or Tomies Chimneys after its gullies that lead to its summit) 568 metres (1,864 ft).

The Purple Mountain Group is bounded to the west by the Gap of Dunloe, which separates it from MacGillycuddy's Reeks range. To the south and east are the Lakes of Killarney and to the north is the wide, flat valley of the River Laune. The eastern half of Purple Mountain is part of Killarney National Park. Within the national park, the lower slopes are covered in oak forests, some of which are remnants of those that covered Ireland before the arrival of humans.

Purple Mountain's individual prominence qualifies it as a Marilyn, and its prominence is within 10 metres of the P600 prominence threshold of 600 metres (1,969 ft), which classes Purple Mountain as a "Sub–major" mountain. Purple Mountain meets the Arderin, Simm and Hewitt classifications. It ranks as the 12th–highest mountain in Ireland on the MountainViews Online Database, 100 Highest Irish Mountains, where the prominence threshold is 100 metres.

== Name ==
Irish academic Paul Tempan wrote in his 2010 Irish Hill and Mountain Names, that Purple Mountain is "almost certainly a name coined in English". In his Topographical Dictionary of Ireland (1837), Samuel Lewis wrote that Purple Mountain is "so called from the colour of the shivered slate on its surface". Tempan notes that the "Irish version looks like a back–translation from the English by OSI".

Prior to the 19th–century, there are references to the massif being called Tomies, Tomish or Toomish mountain. Tempan notes that in The Ancient and Present State of the County of Kerry (1756) by Charles Smith, it is clear this name applied to the whole Purple Mountain Group. Other of 19th–century sources confirm this, and it explains why Purple Mountain is not marked on the 6" map, though Tomies and Shehy Mountain are. In Irish Names of Places, Patrick Weston Joyce writes that Tomies comes from the Irish Tuamaidhe, meaning two burial cairns on the summit. As Purple Mountain gained currency in the 19th century, the older name was relegated in status, and now refers to a lower peak of the group, Tomies Mountain 735 metres (2,411 ft).

== Hill walking ==
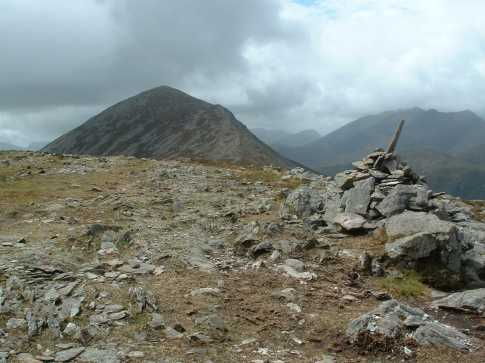
Summit of Purple Mountain from the summit of Purple Mountain NE Top. The eastern section of the MacGillycuddy's Reeks are back left.

The classic walk of Purple Mountain is the 14–kilometre 5–6 hour Gap of Dunloe Loop starting at Kate Kearney's Cottage and walking up the Gap of Dunloe road (circa 1 hour) past Black Lough to the Head of the Gap; the route then follows the path east into the Purple Mountain massif, and then northeast up to Glas Lough, and then to Purple Mountain itself. From there, the route follows the ridge to Purple Mountain NE Top, Tomies Mountain (or An Chathair), and Tomies North Top (also called Tomies Rock), and then returning to Kate Kearney's Cottage (care is needed to descend Tommies Chimneys and find the right paths back to Kate Kearney's).

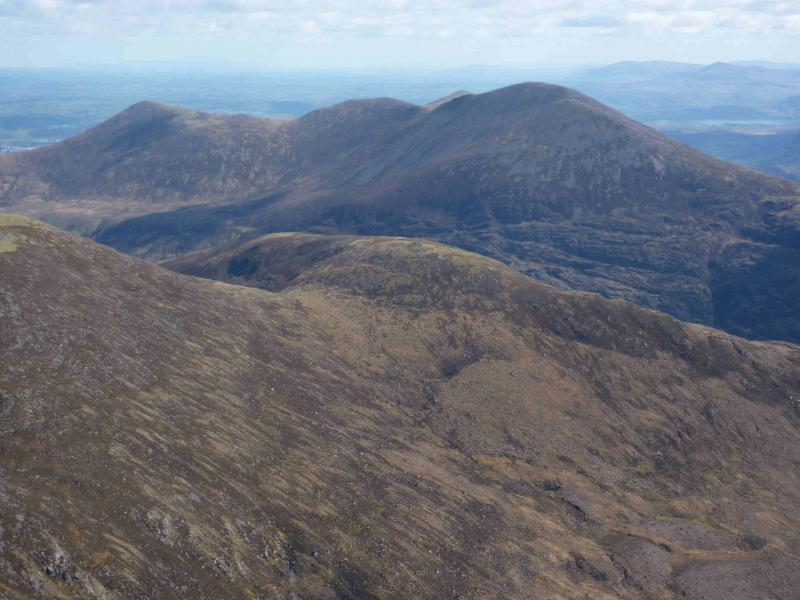
Purple Mountain (r), Purple Mountain NE Top (m), and Tomies Mountain (l). Shehy is visible between Purple Mountain and its NE Top.

A faster alternative to the classic loop–route is the 7–kilometre 3–4 hour route from the Head of the Gap up to Purple Mountain (and potentially Purple Mountain NE Top), and then retracing the path back down to the Head of the Gap. However, there is limited parking around the Head of the Gap area (V872838), and the best climbing between Purple Mountain and Tomies North Top is omitted; an alternative is a jaunting–car from Kate Kearney's Cottage to the Head of the Gap, from which the 9–kilometre 4–5 hour remaining Gap of Dunloe Loop route is completed.

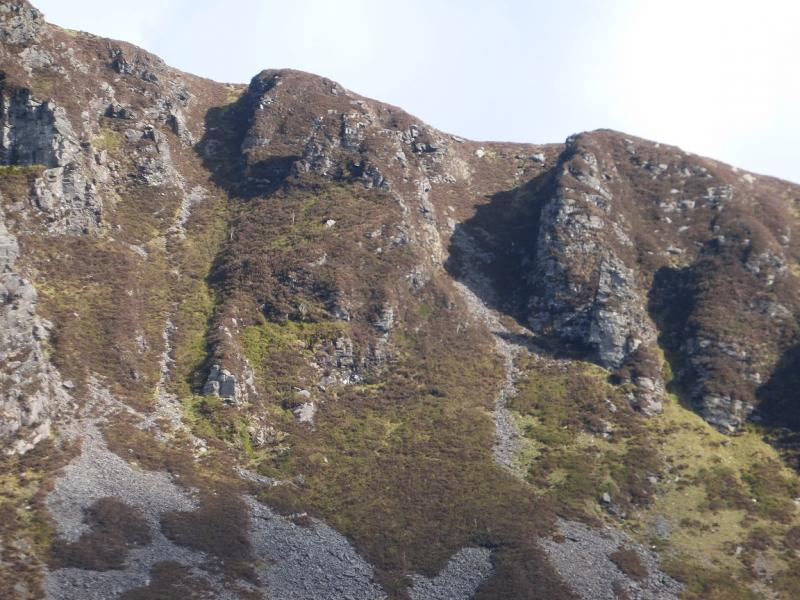
Tomies Chimneys, leading to Tomies North Top (or Tomies Rock)

A third route is the 9–kilometre 4–5 hour route that starts from Kate Kearney's Cottage and directly ascends to Tomies North Top (also called Tomies Rock), via the gullies of Tomies Chimneys, with care needed to find the right paths through the heather to Tomies Chimneys. From there, Tomies Mountain and Purple Mountain are climbed, and the route is retraced to get back to the starting point of Kate Kearney's Cottage.

== List of peaks ==
The following is a download from the MountainViews Online Database, who list 5 Purple Mountain Group peaks over 100 metres.

Peaks of the Purple Mountain Group (MountainViews Online Database, October 2018)
Height Rank	Prominence Rank	Name	Height (m)	Prominence (m)	Height (ft)	Prominence (ft)	Topo Map	OSI Grid Reference
1	1	Purple Mountain	832	597	2,730	1,959	78	V804844
2	3	Shehy Mountain	762	47	2,500	154	78	V902857
3	4	Purple Mountain NE Top	757	35	2,484	115	78	V894858
4	2	Tomies Mountain (An Chathair)	735	60	2,411	197	78	V895868
5	5	Tomies North Top (Tomies Rock)	568	20	1,864	66	78	V891874

== Bibliography ==
- Fairbairn, Helen (2014). Ireland's Best Walks: A Walking Guide. Collins Press. ISBN 978-1848892118.
- MountainViews (Simon Stewart) (2013). A Guide to Ireland's Mountain Summits: The Vandeleur-Lynams & the Arderins. Collins Books. ISBN 978-1-84889-164-7.
- Ryan, Jim (2006). Carrauntoohil and MacGillycuddy's Reeks: A Walking Guide to Ireland's Highest Mountains. Collins Press. ISBN 978-1905172337.
- Dillion, Paddy (1993). The Mountains of Ireland: A Guide to Walking the Summits. Cicerone. ISBN 978-1852841102.

== See also ==
- Gap of Dunloe
- Lists of mountains in Ireland
- List of mountains of the British Isles by height
- List of Marilyns in the British Isles
- List of Hewitt mountains in England, Wales and Ireland
