= Stumpa Dúloigh =

Mountain in Kerry, Ireland

- Maol
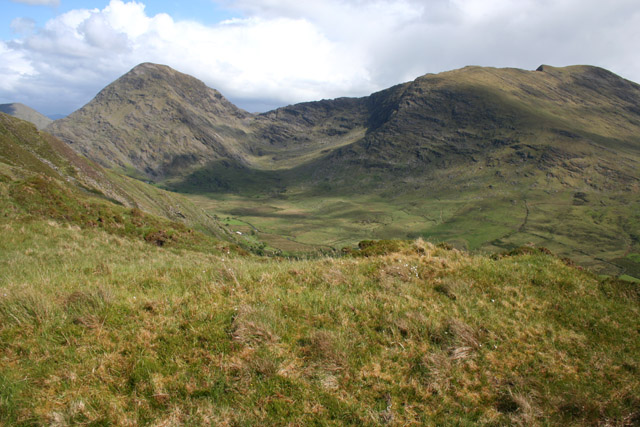
- Bridia Valley, with Stumpa Dúloigh on the right

Highest point
- Elevation: 784 m (2,572 ft)
- Prominence: 499 m (1,637 ft)
- Listing: Marilyn, Hewitt
- Coordinates: 51°57′13.5″N 9°45′54.9″W

Naming
- English translation: Stump of the black lake
- Language of name: Irish

Geography
- Location within island of Ireland
- Location: County Kerry, Ireland
- Parent range: Dunkerron Mountains (Mountains of the Iveragh Peninsula)
- OSI/OSNI grid: V787793

Climbing
- Easiest route: scrambling

Stumpa Dúloigh (Irish for "stump of the black lake") also known as Maol, is the highest of the Dunkerron Mountains, part of the Mountains of the Iveragh Peninsula in County Kerry, Ireland. It has a height of 784 metres (2,572 ft) and lies southwest of MacGillycuddy's Reeks.

== Name ==
The mountain is named after a small lake called Loch an Dúloigh or Lough Duff. The mountain's alternative name Maol means "bare flat-topped hill". It is reflected in placenames on its slopes: Coimín na Maoile, Loch na Maoile (Lough Namweela), and An Mhaol Ghlas (Moyleglass).

== Geography ==
The mountain lies northwest of Knockaunanattin (569 m). West of Stumpa Dúloigh the Dunkerron range splits in two parts: the NE one leads to Broaghnabinnia (745 m) while the SE sub-range reaches Knocknabreeda (569 m). With an elevation of 784 metres it is the 55th highest summit in Ireland.

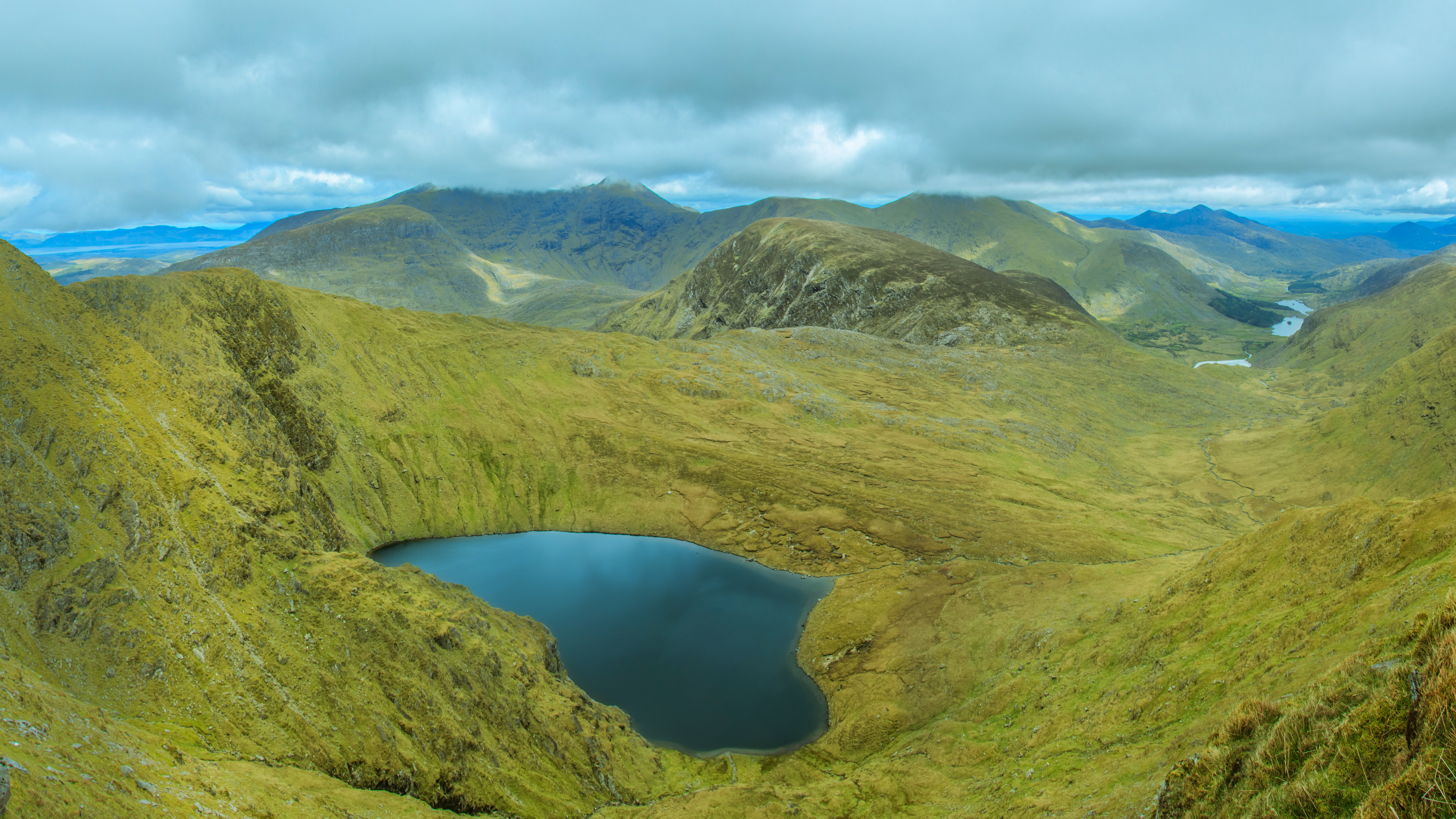
View from Stumpa Dúloigh's summit, in the foreground lies Lough Duff and directly behind is situated Broaghnabinnia mountain. Looking to the right into the Black Valley. In the background can be viewed the MacGillycuddy's Reeks.

== Access to the summit ==
Stumpa Dúloigh's summit can be accessed from the end of the Black Valley; it is a 6 hours' walk (there and back) suitable only for experienced hikers.
