= Kerry Woollen Mills =

Wool mill in Kerry, Ireland

Coordinates: 52.101864°N 9.683246°W

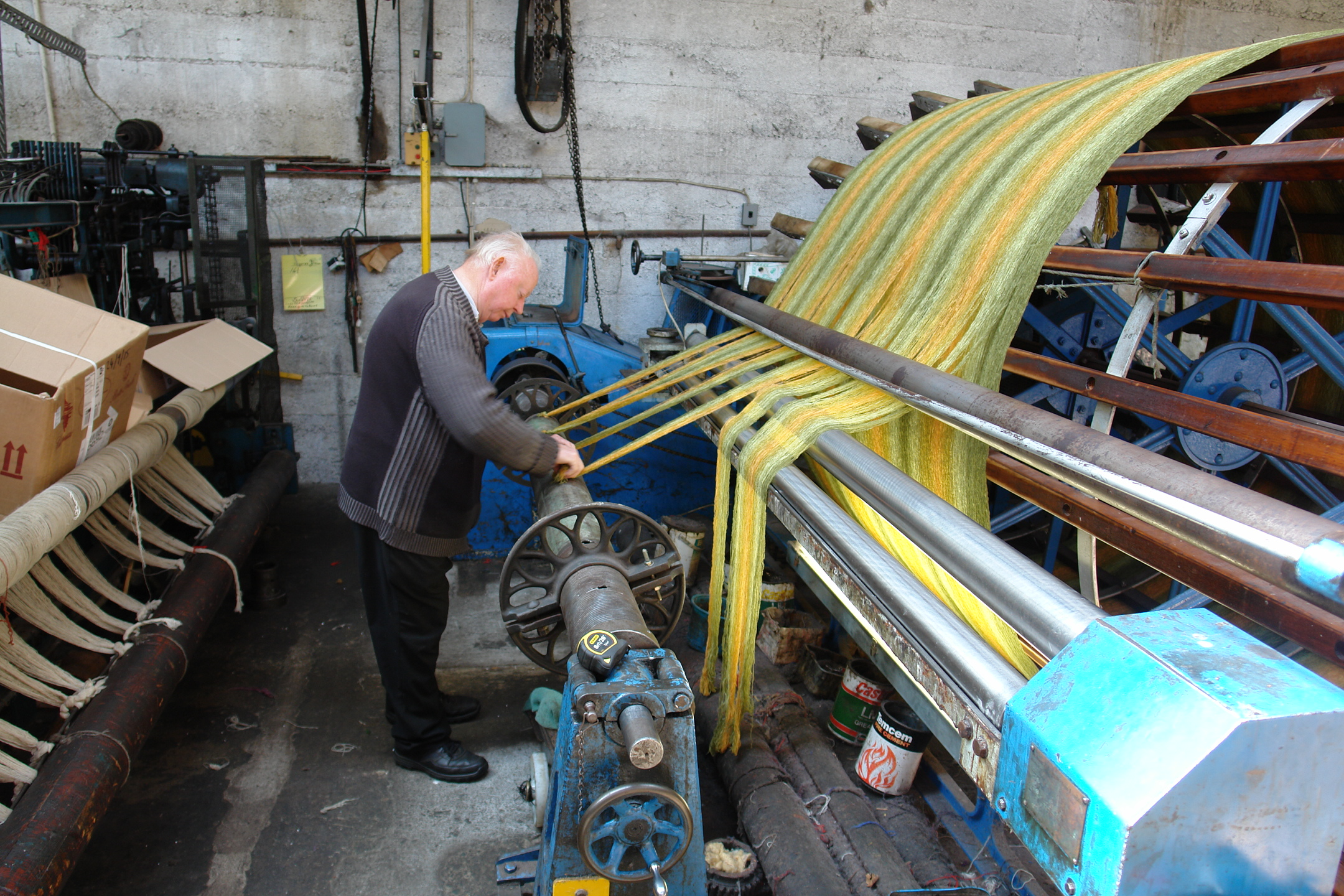
Kerry Woollen Mills

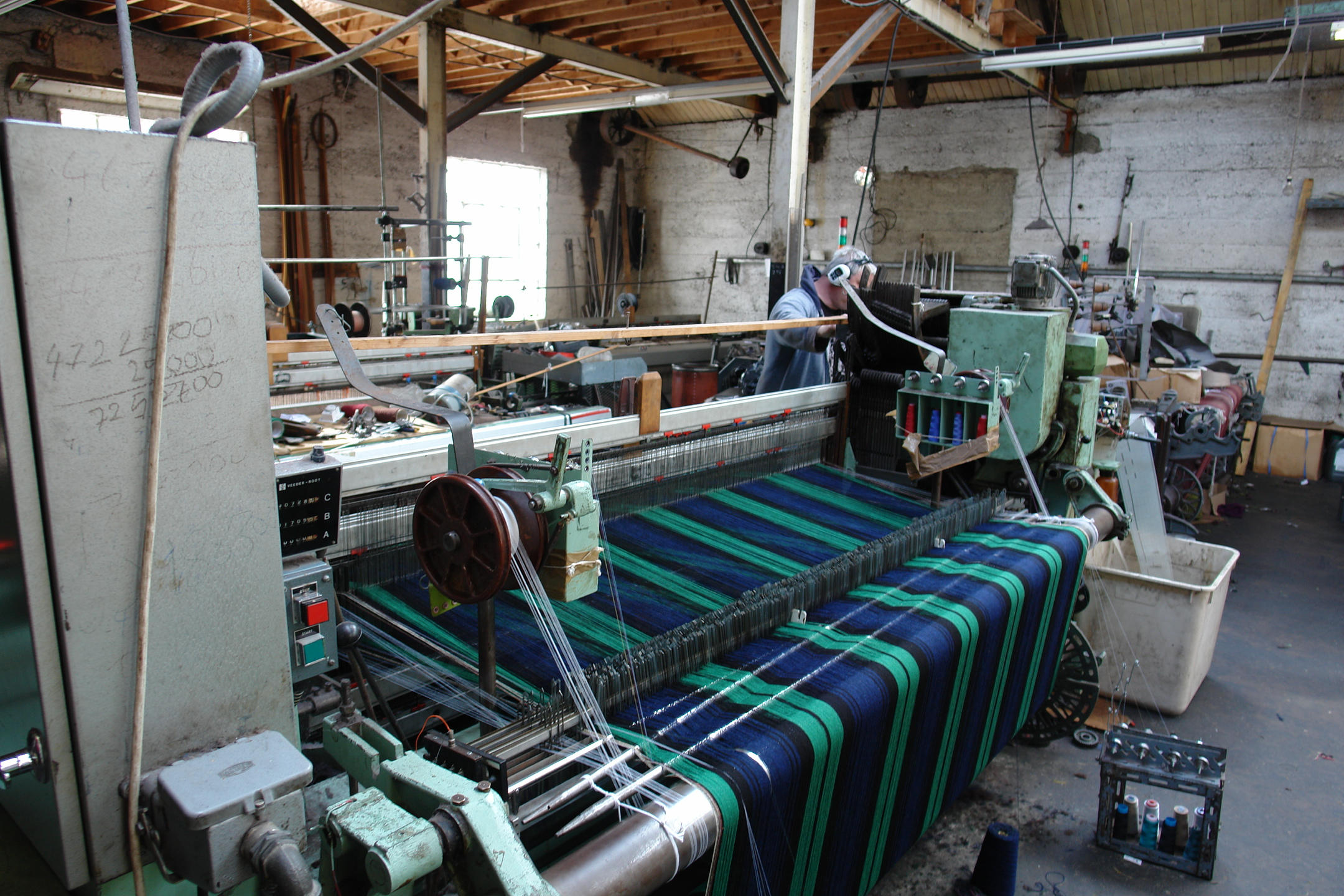
Loom at Kerry Woollen Mills

Kerry Woollen Mills are historic wool mills based just off the Ring of Kerry.

== History ==
Kerry Woollen Mills are one of the last remaining traditional wool mills still manufacturing in County Kerry. The company was founded over 300 years ago. The mill's machinery was originally driven by the River Gweestin, and its water was also used for washing and dying the wool. The mill was run by the Sealy family for many generations since its inception in 1760 and after the last male heir, John Sealy, moved to New York City, was brought into the capable hands of the Eadie family in 1904, who had gained experience in the wool manufacturing business for many years in County Fermanagh and Scotland and are now successfully managing the mill in the fourth generation. Wool is spun, dyed and woven on the premises at the back of a well-stocked showroom, where yarns and the finished products are displayed.

The mill is set in a rural location with many of historic buildings still being used. The machinery is a blend of the traditional and modern. The company focuses on supplying its products in traditional colours and designs to niche markets around the world. Visitors can visit and see the carding, spinning, weaving and finishing of natural fibre textiles and fashion products such as scarves, shawls, tweeds, specialty blankets and rugs. The Mill supplies its products to a loyal customer base across four principal segments: Manufacturers of clothing and headwear from the British Isles buy tweed, hotels and guesthouses order bespoke blankets, retail shops in Ireland and overseas buy the products to sell them to end customers. For specialty products e.g. in the equestrian industry, the mills sell also through their own outlet shops directly to the public, primarily to American tourists.
