= Ring of Kerry =

Tourist route in Ireland

Coordinates: 51°56′56″N 9°55′03″W

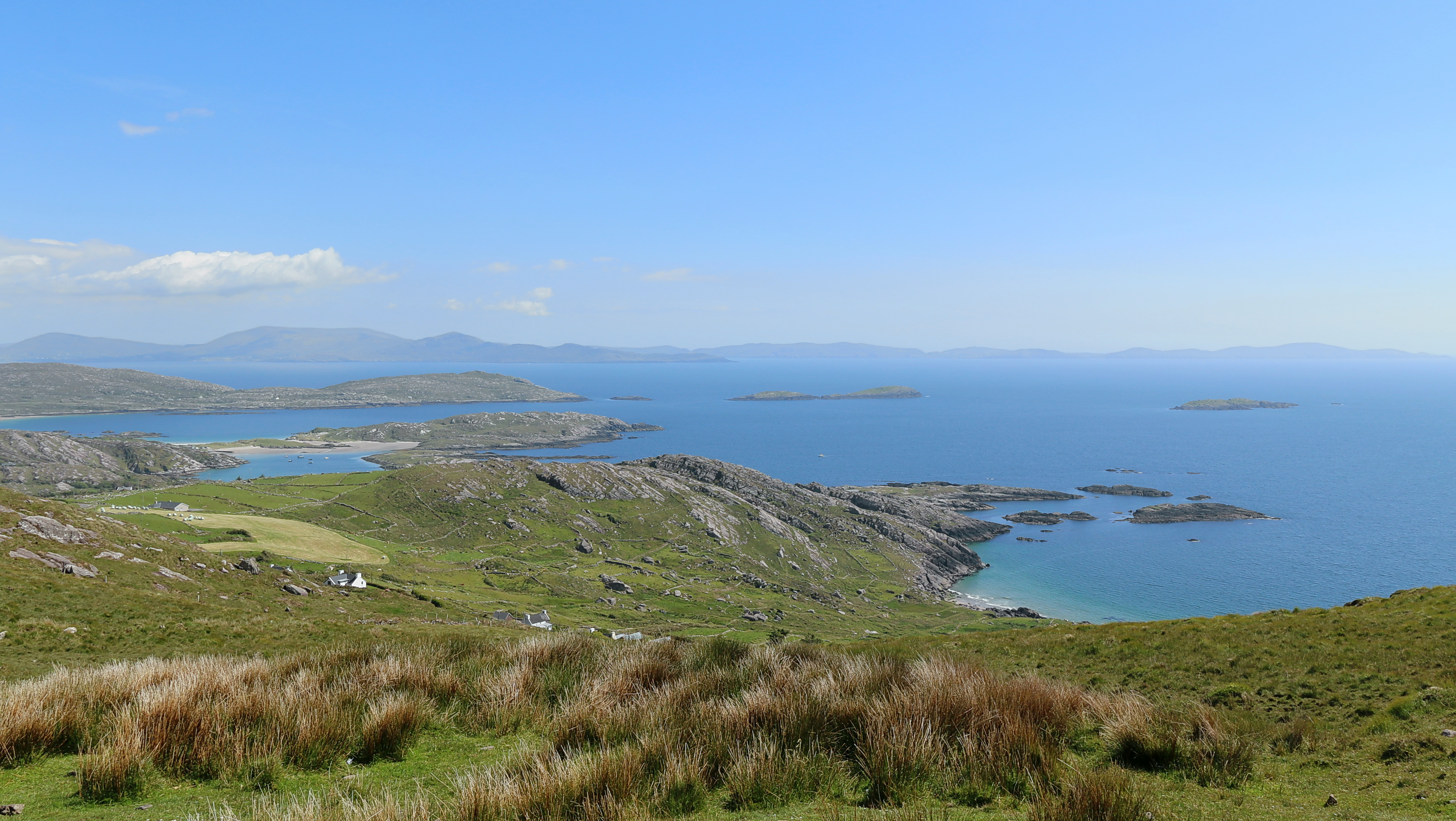

Route information
- Length: 179 km (111 mi)

Major junctions
- Tourist loop around the Iveragh Peninsula

Location
- Country: Ireland
- Counties: County Kerry

Highway system
- Roads in Ireland; Motorways; Primary; Secondary; Regional

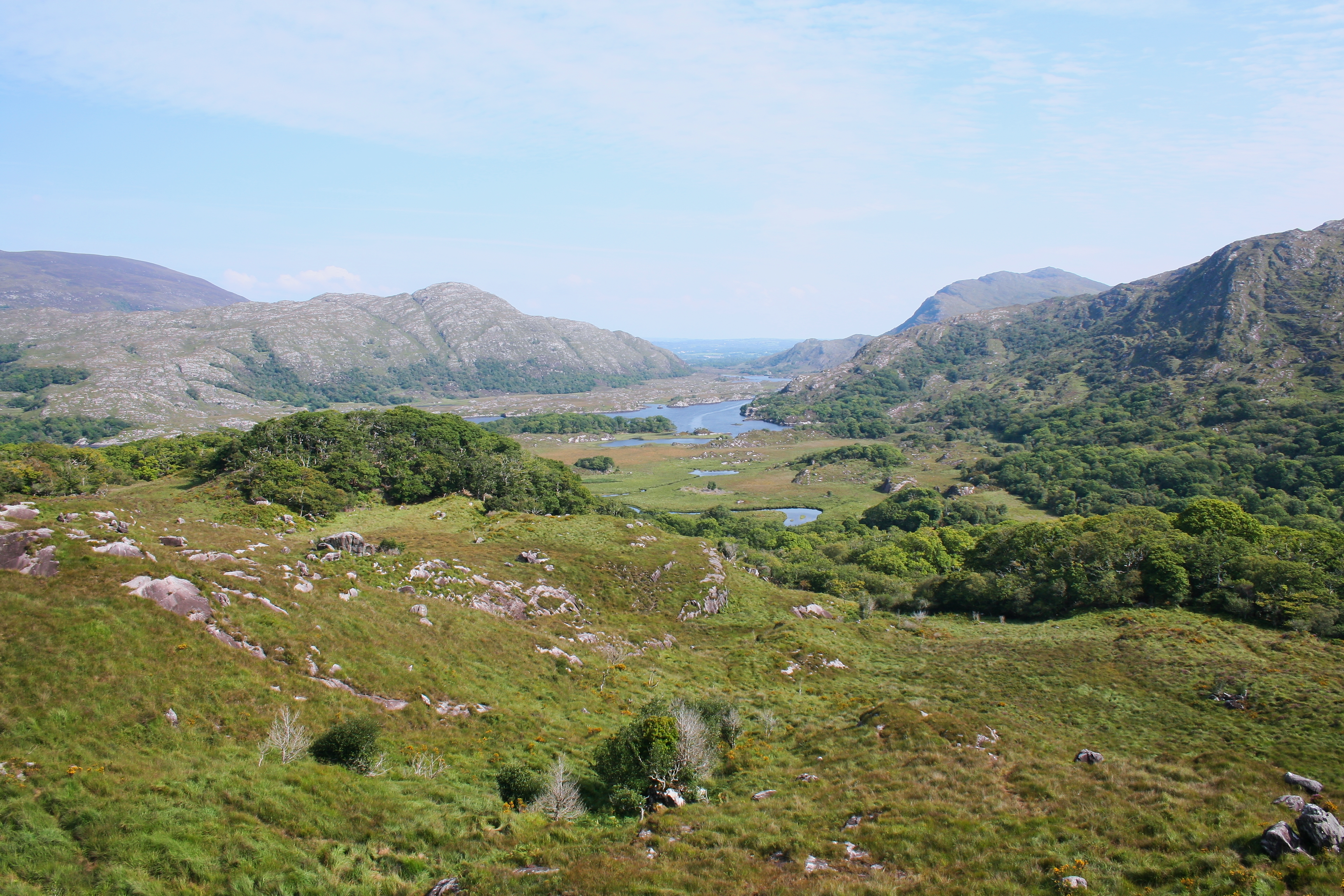
Ladies View, a scenic point along the Ring.

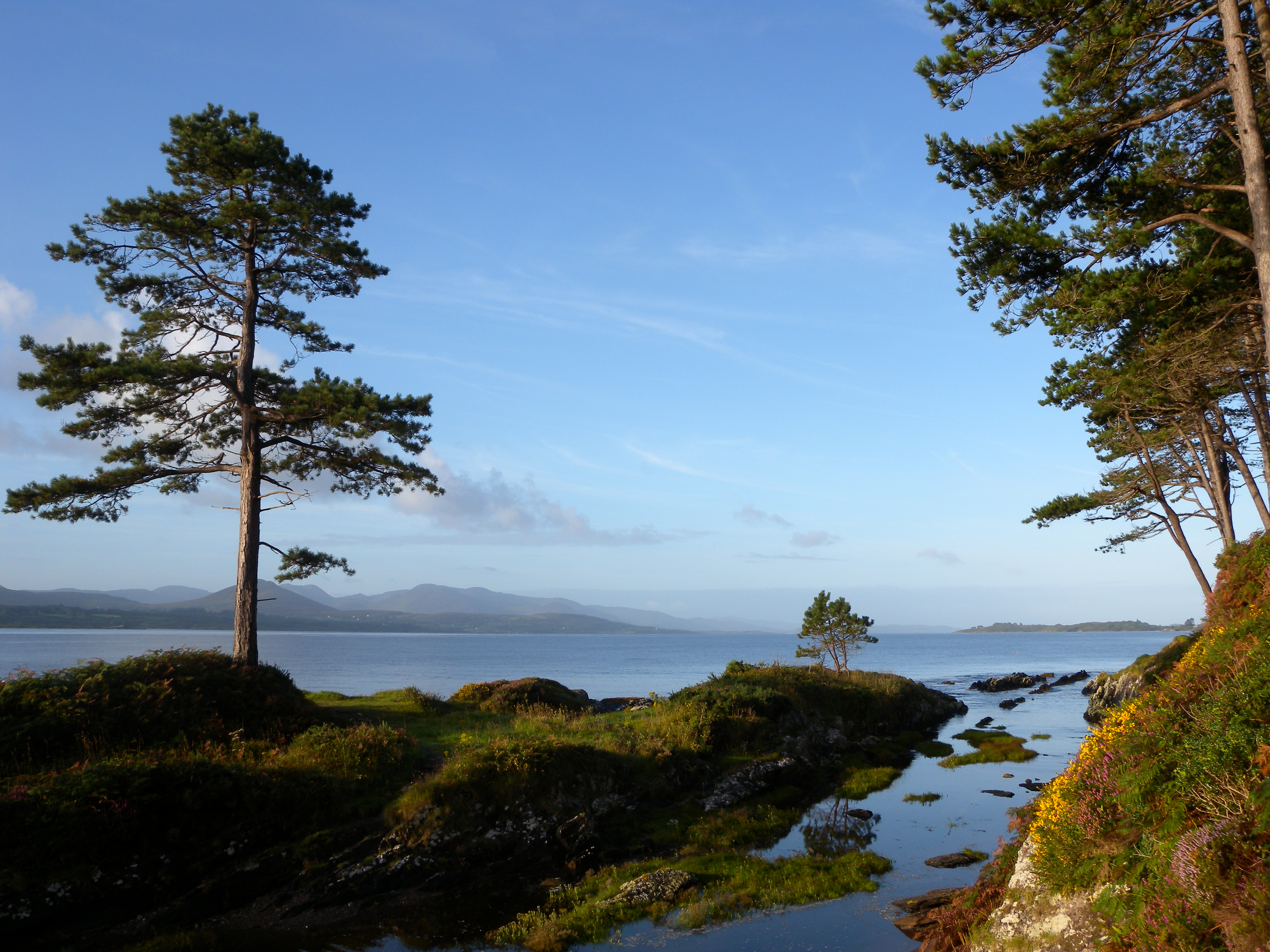
Scenic view of the Ring of Kerry in the south west.

The Ring of Kerry (Irish: Mórchuaird Chiarraí) is a 179-kilometre-long (111-mile) circular tourist route in County Kerry, south-western Ireland. Clockwise from Killarney it follows the N71 to Kenmare, then the N70 around the Iveragh Peninsula to Killorglin – passing through Sneem, Waterville, Cahersiveen, and Glenbeigh – before returning to Killarney via the N72.

== Attractions ==
Popular points include Muckross House (near Killarney), Staigue stone fort and Derrynane House, home of Daniel O'Connell. Just south of Killarney, Ross Castle, Lough Leane, and Ladies View (a panoramic viewpoint), all located within Killarney National Park, are major attractions located along the Ring. A more complete list of major attractions along the Ring of Kerry includes: Gap of Dunloe, Bog Village, Dunloe Ogham Stones, Kerry Woollen Mills, Rossbeigh Beach, Cahersiveen Heritage Centre, Derrynane House, Skellig Experience, Staigue Fort, Kenmare Lace, Moll's Gap, Ballymalis Castle, Ladies View, Torc Waterfall, Muckross House, The Blue Pool, Ross Castle, Ogham Stones, St Mary’s Cathedral, Muckross Abbey, Franciscan Friary, Kellegy Church, O’Connell Memorial Church, Sneem Church and Cemetery, Skellig Michael (off the coast), Beehive Cells and the Stone Pillars marking an important grave.

== Routes ==
There is also an established walking path named The Kerry Way, which takes its own route, and a signposted Ring of Kerry cycling path which uses older quieter roads where possible. The Kerry Way roughly follows the scenic driving route of the Ring of Kerry.

There are numerous variations to the route taking in St. Finian's Bay and Valentia Island which the official driving ring misses (the official cycling route takes in Valentia Island). As well as beaches, it also offers the Gap of Dunloe, Bog Village, Derrynane House, the Skellig Experience Valentia Island, Moll's Gap, Torc Waterfall, Muckross House, and Ross Castle.

"The Ring" is a popular day trip and numerous bus companies offer circuits during the summer months. As the narrow roads make it difficult for tour coaches to pass one another, all tour buses run in an anti-clockwise direction, travelling via Killorglin first. Some recommend that car owners travel in the opposite direction, going first to Kenmare to avoid delays caused by tour buses. Others advise travelling counter-clockwise to avoid having to pass the buses. In 2008 satellite navigation systems were blamed for directing bus drivers in a clockwise direction around the route.
