= Broaghnabinnia =

Mountain in Ireland

- Bruach na Binne
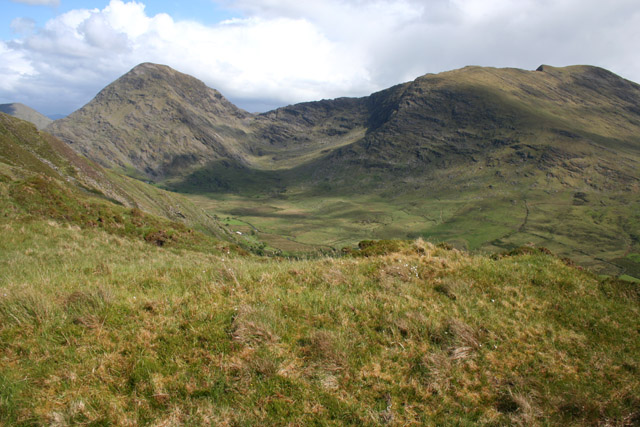
- Bridia Valley, with Broaghnabinnia on the left

Highest point
- Elevation: 745 m (2,444 ft)
- Prominence: 290 m (950 ft)
- Listing: Marilyn, Hewitt
- Coordinates: 51°58′19.2″N 9°44′38.4″W

Naming
- English translation: Verge of the peak
- Language of name: Irish

Geography
- Location within Ireland
- Location: County Kerry, Ireland
- Parent range: Dunkerron Mountains (Mountains of the Iveragh Peninsula)
- OSI/OSNI grid: V801814

Climbing
- Easiest route: scrambling

Broaghnabinnia (Irish: Bruach na Binne, meaning 'verge of the peak') is a summit of the Dunkerron Mountains, part of the Mountains of the Iveragh Peninsula in County Kerry, Ireland.

== Geography ==
The mountain lies northeast of Stumpa Dúloigh, the highest mountain of the Dunkerron range. With an elevation of 745 metres it is the 80th highest summit in Ireland.

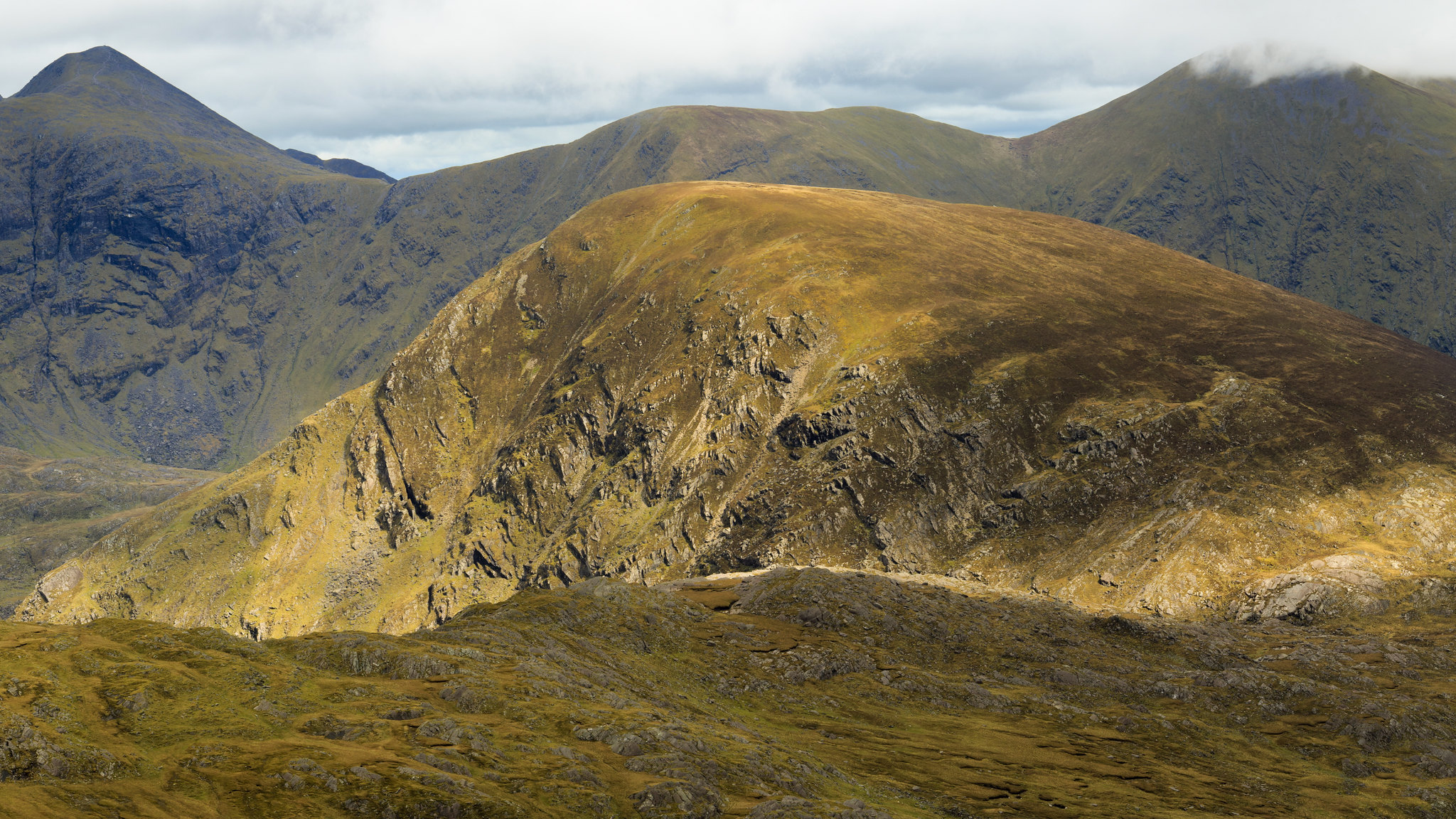
Viewed from Stumpa Dúloigh

== Access to the summit ==
Broaghnabinnia summit can be accessed scrambling, and is steep on all sides.
