= Kenmare =

Town in County Kerry, Ireland

Kenmare Neidín (Irish)
- Town
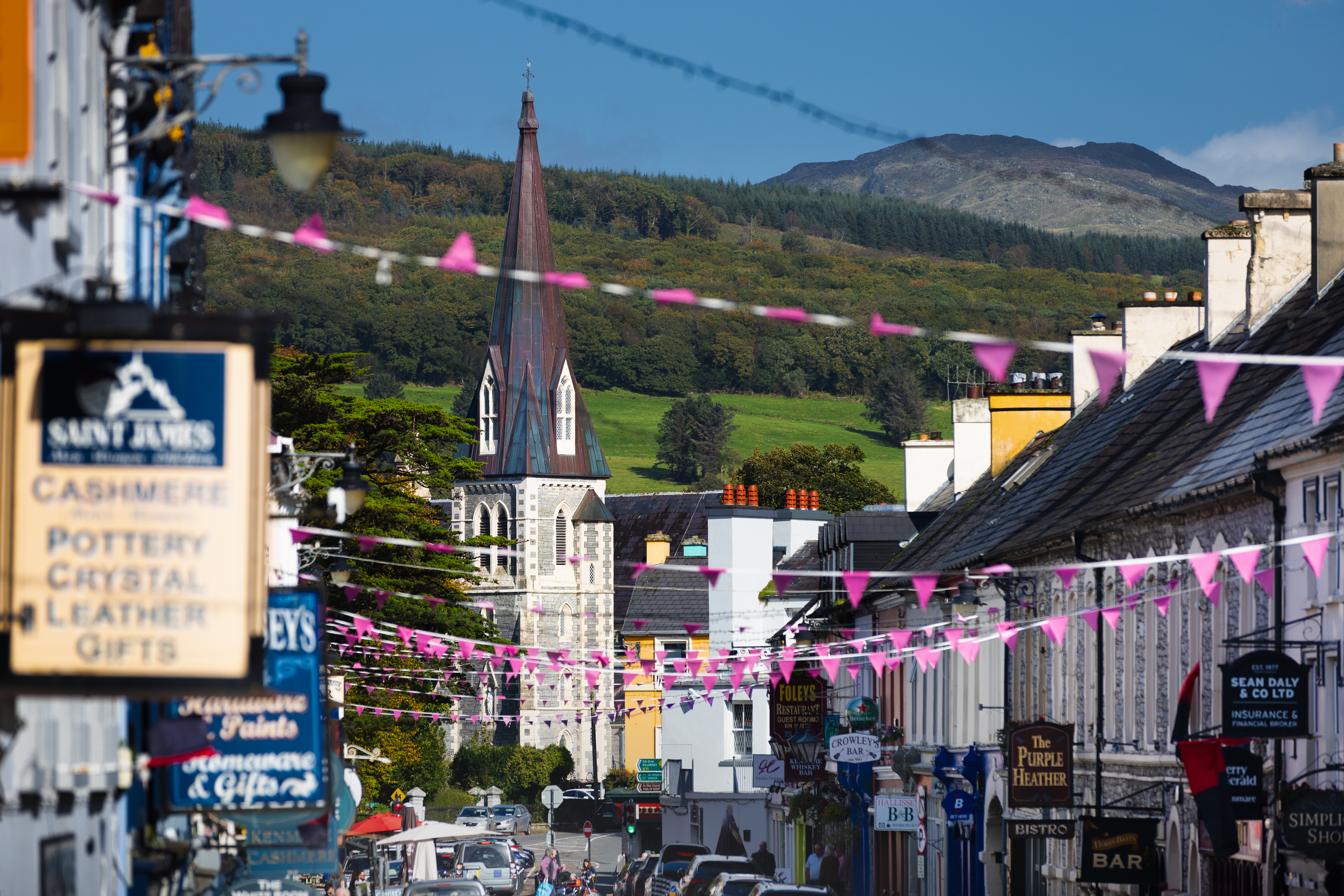
- Henry Street, Kenmare

- Location in Ireland
- Coordinates: 51.8801°N 9.5835°W
- Country: Ireland
- Province: Munster
- County: County Kerry

Population (2022)
  - Total: 2,566
- Irish Grid Reference: V908709
- Website: www.kenmare.ie

Historical population
| Year | Pop. | ±% |
|---|---|---|
| 1821 | 605 | — |
| 1831 | 1,072 | +77.2% |
| 1841 | 1,339 | +24.9% |
| 1851 | 1,509 | +12.7% |
| 1861 | 1,200 | −20.5% |
| 1871 | 1,205 | +0.4% |
| 1881 | 1,279 | +6.1% |
| 1891 | 1,189 | −7.0% |
| 1901 | 1,122 | −5.6% |
| 1911 | 1,034 | −7.8% |
| 1926 | 883 | −14.6% |
| 1936 | 921 | +4.3% |
| 1946 | 906 | −1.6% |
| 1951 | 907 | +0.1% |
| 1956 | 1,054 | +16.2% |
| 1961 | 1,046 | −0.8% |
| 1966 | 1,113 | +6.4% |
| 1971 | 903 | −18.9% |
| 1981 | 1,123 | +24.4% |
| 1986 | 1,130 | +0.6% |
| 1991 | 1,366 | +20.9% |
| 1996 | 1,420 | +4.0% |
| 2002 | 1,844 | +29.9% |
| 2006 | 1,701 | −7.8% |
| 2011 | 2,175 | +27.9% |
| 2016 | 2,376 | +9.2% |
| 2022 | 2,566 | +8.0% |

Kenmare (Irish: Neidín, meaning 'the little nest') is a town in the south of County Kerry, Ireland. The name Kenmare is the anglicised form of Ceann Mara, meaning "head of the sea", referring to the head of Kenmare Bay.

Kenmare had a population of 2,566 in 2022. It is also a townland and civil parish.

== Location ==
Kenmare is located at the head of Kenmare Bay (where it reaches the farthest inland), sometimes called the Kenmare River, where the Roughty River (An Ruachtach) flows into the sea, and at the junction of the Iveragh Peninsula and the Beara Peninsula. It is also located near the MacGillycuddy's Reeks, Mangerton Mountain and Caha Mountains and is a popular hillwalking destination. Nearby towns and villages are Tuosist, Ardgroom, Glengarriff, Kilgarvan, Killarney, Templenoe and Sneem.

Kenmare is in the Kerry constituency of Dáil Éireann.

== History ==
Evidence of ancient settlement in the Kenmare area includes one of the largest stone circles in the south-west of Ireland. Close to the town, this stone circle shows occupation in the area going back to at least the Bronze Age (2,200–500 B.C), when it was constructed. The circle has 15 stones around the circumference with a boulder dolmen in the centre.

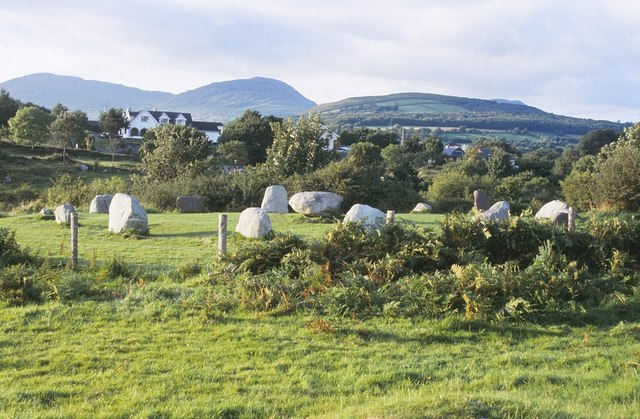
Kenmare Stone Circle

Vikings are said to have raided the area around the town which at that time was called Ceann Mhara, which means "head of the sea" in Irish.

The entire area was granted to the English economist and scientist Sir William Petty by Oliver Cromwell as part payment for completing the mapping of Ireland, the Down Survey in 1656. He laid out the modern town circa 1670. Before him, a previous surveyor of Ireland, Sir Valentine Browne (1510–1589), ancestor of the Earl of Kenmare, was granted some lands in County Kerry during the resulting plantation, the Munster Plantation.

The three main streets that form a triangle in the centre of the town are called Main Street (originally William Street, after William Petty, 1st Marquess of Lansdowne), Henry Street (originally Sound Road), after the son of the 1st Marquis and Shelbourne Street (Henry Petty became the first Earl of Shelburne). This name was also later applied to Shelbourne Road in Dublin.

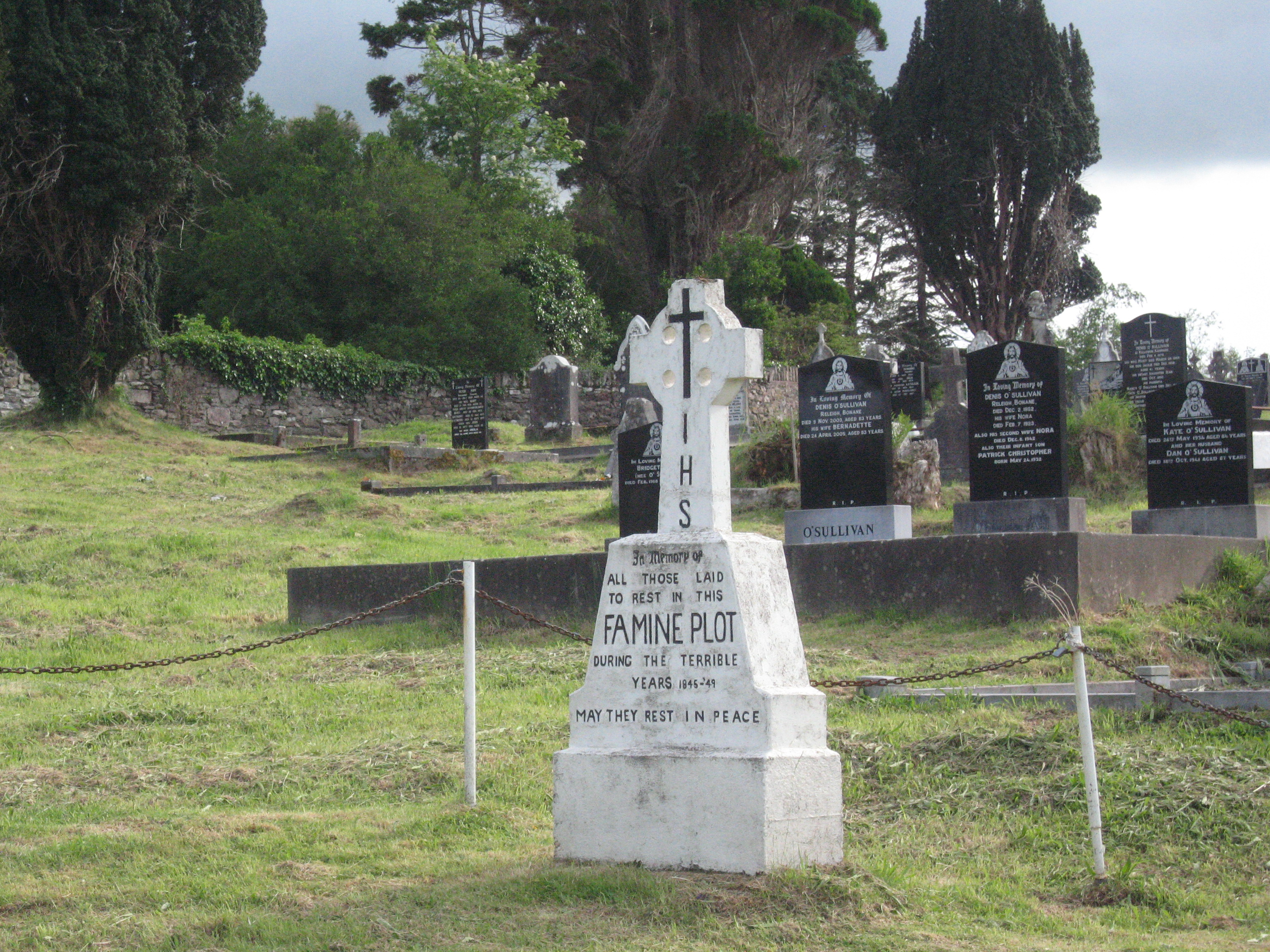
Mass famine grave for Kenmare victims

The convent in the town, the Poor Clare Sisters, was founded in 1861 when five nuns including Sister Mary Frances Cusack (The Nun of Kenmare), who was also an author and publisher of many books, moved to Kenmare from their convent in Newry, County Down. Under the guidance of Mother Abbess O'Hagan in 1864 a lace-working industry was established and Kenmare lace became noted worldwide. The convent no longer exists and Pobalscoil Inbhear Scéine secondary school occupies this site since 2001.

A suspension bridge, which is claimed to be the first in Ireland, over the Kenmare River was opened in 1841 and served the community till 1932 when it was replaced by a new concrete bridge.

During and after the Civil War (1922–1923), there were a number of incidents in Kenmare, including the killing of O'Connor brothers in September 1922 by the Anti-Treaty IRA, and the brutal assault against the allegedly Unionist daughters of a local doctor by three Dublin Guard officers led by Paddy Daly in 1923 (which is sometimes referred to as the 'Kenmare incident'). Kenmare was briefly held by the Anti-Treaty IRA, during the Irish Civil War, before being successfully retaken by the Irish Army in December 1922.

The town library is one of the Carnegie Libraries funded by Andrew Carnegie. It opened in 1918, and the architect was R.M. Butler. The library building is now home to the Carnegie Arts Centre and theatre, hosting a local drama group and a number of travelling productions each year, as well as music and comedy nights.

Holy Cross Catholic Church in Kenmare was consecrated in 1864. It was built under the guidance of Archdeacon Fr. John O'Sullivan – who is interred within the church. The church has stained glass windows by O'Connor London (1863), by Caseys Dublin (1864) and by Earley Dublin (1864). The organ is by Telford & Telford(1865). Buried in the church grounds is Monsignor Francis Cremin (died 2001), who was a periitus or theological expert at Vatican II. He was a native of Kenmare and had been Professor of Canon Law and Moral Theology at St Patrick's College, Maynooth from 1949 until 1980. He was a brother of Con Cremin, an Irish diplomat, who represented Ireland in France and Germany during World War II and subsequently in Portugal, the Holy See, the United Kingdom and at the United Nations.

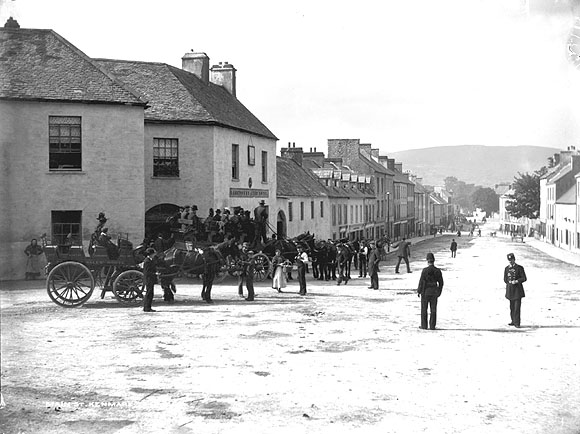
View of Main Street in Kenmare (between the 1880s and early 1900s)

The Church of Ireland church of St Patrick celebrated its 150th anniversary in 2008. The town has been a winner in the Irish Tidy Towns Competition in 2013, 2000 and was a runner-up in 2003 and 2008.

== Tourism ==
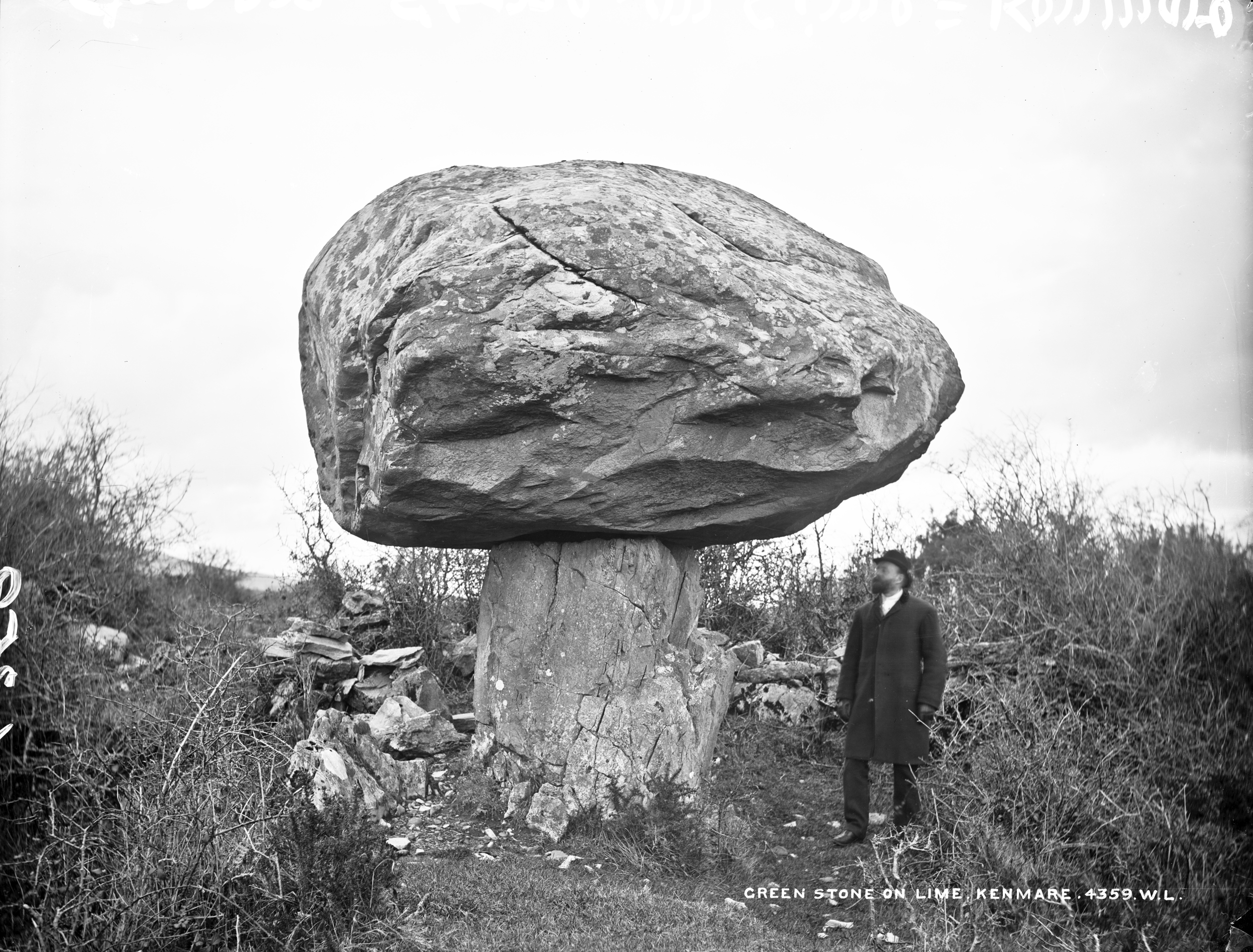
Carrigacappeen erratic, Kenmare, 1890s

Kenmare lies on two noted Irish tourist routes, the Ring of Kerry and the Ring of Beara, approximately 32 kilometres (20 mi) from Killarney. As a result, it is a popular tourist destination and many of the businesses in the area cater to tourists. The town is noted for its food and pubs.

Since the late 1990s the tourism industry has driven local construction work, with land being sold at high prices to developers wishing to build estates of holiday homes. This has led to an increase in the town's population, particularly during the peak tourist season, and prompted fears among some residents that the town is becoming overdeveloped and losing much of its identity.

== Notable people ==
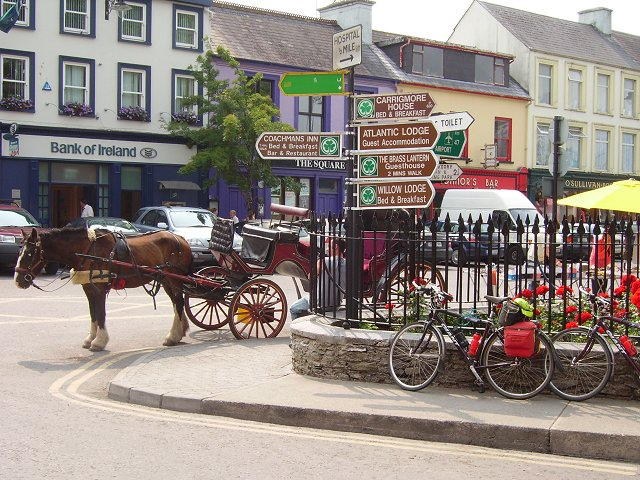
Horse and cart in Kenmare.

Inter-county Gaelic footballers Mickey 'Ned' O'Sullivan, Stephen O'Brien and Paul O'Connor are from the Kenmare area, while Pat Spillane is from nearby Templenoe. Kenmare is also the home of Irish Olympic slalom skier Thos Foley.

Kenmare was home to composer Ernest John Moeran in later life. Diplomat Con Cremin was also from Kenmare, as is senator Mark Daly. Writer Anna McPartlin grew up in Kenmare, and her 2007 novel Apart from the Crowd was set in the town.

Francis Brennan is the owner of the five-star Park Hotel in Kenmare. He and his brother John, owner of the nearby Dromquinna Manor Hotel in Templenoe, are known for their TV series "At Your Service".

== Fair days ==
Due to its location at the centre of a large agricultural area, Kenmare served as the local market town. Until the establishment of an auction mart in the early 1990s, the approximately monthly fair days were a time when farmers would stand their animals in the streets for sale to visiting stock dealers. The only fair which continues to be held is that of 15 August, which coincides with the Catholic holy day of obligation marking the Assumption of Mary. The day attracts crowds of locals and visitors and is the busiest day of the year in Kenmare.

== Transport ==
There are daily bus-services in summer to Killarney and in the off-season, the bus runs Monday-Friday. There is also a daily service to/from Cork in the summer months on the N71 via Bantry, Skibbereen, Clonakilty and Bandon. In mid-2023, a new service from Killarney to Skibbereen via Kenmare was announced, replacing the previous Killarney to Kenmare and Kenmare to Skibbereen services with additional journeys and extended hours.

The N71 also connects Kenmare to Killarney on a mountainous and scenic part of the Ring of Kerry route via Moll's Gap and Ladies View. Alternatively one can reach Killarney via the slightly longer but more comfortable route through Kilgarvan. Kenmare also lies on the N71 national secondary road south-Cork route to Glengarriff. In November 2014, the Eastern Relief Road was opened, allowing drivers from the R569 Kilgarvan Road to bypass the town centre when accessing the supermarkets and schools.

Kenmare railway station opened, in October 1893, as the terminus of a branch from the Great Southern and Western Railway's Mallow–Tralee line at Headford Junction. The station closed, along with the branch, in early 1960 and the last passenger train ran on 1 February 1960. The track was lifted shortly afterwards.

== Services ==
The town has a primary and secondary school, a public library, community hospital, as well as Catholic, Church of Ireland and Methodist churches.

== Sports ==
The local Gaelic Athletic Association (GAA) club, Kenmare Shamrocks, competes in Kerry GAA competitions. Kenmare's soccer club, Inter Kenmare F.C., competes in the Kerry District League at U17, Youth & Senior Men's/Women's levels.

George Mayberry from Kenmare participated in the 1908 Summer Olympics.

Kenmare Kestrels Basketball Club was founded in 2006 and competes in the Kerry Area Basketball League. Overlooking Kenmare Bay and adjacent to the Park Hotel is the 18-hole Kenmare Golf Club.

== In popular culture ==
In the fictional Harry Potter universe, Kenmare is home to the Kenmare Kestrels, one of only thirteen Quidditch teams that play in the Quidditch League of Britain and Ireland. The team players wear emerald-green robes emblazoned with two yellow K's across the chest.

The eponymous song "As I leave behind Neidín" was written by Jimmy MacCarthy and recorded by Mary Black amongst others.

The town was also referenced in the Star Trek: Enterprise episode "Breaking the Ice". The crew aboard the spaceship answer questions received from school children who are said to be from Kenmare.

== See also ==
- List of towns and villages in Ireland
- Market Houses in Ireland
