= Gap of Dunloe =

Mountain pass in County Kerry, Ireland

- Dún Lóich
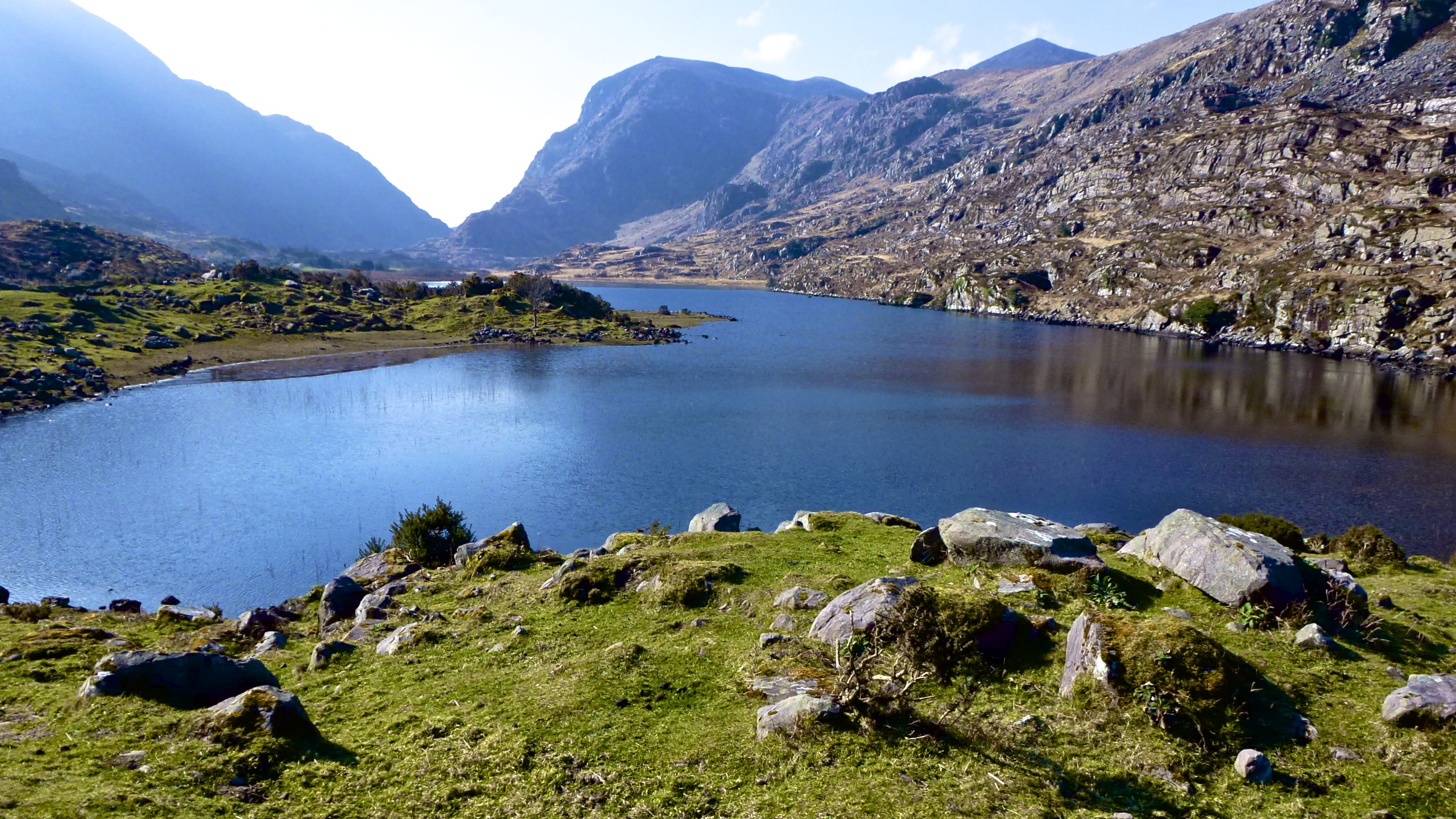
- At the Black Lake in the Gap of Dunloe, looking south towards the Head of the Gap

- Location within Ireland
- Elevation: 241 metres (791 feet)
- Traversed by: Public Road

Location
- Location: County Kerry, Ireland
- Range: MacGillycuddy's Reeks Purple Mountain Group
- Coordinates: 52°1′00″N 9°38′7.8″W
- Topo map: OSI Discovery 78

The Gap of Dunloe (from Irish Dún Lóich, meaning 'Lóich's stronghold'), also recorded as Bearna an Choimín (meaning "gap of the commonage" or "gap of the little hollow"), is a narrow mountain pass running north–south in County Kerry, Ireland, that separates the MacGillycuddy's Reeks mountain range in the west, from the Purple Mountain Group range in the east. It is one of Kerry's most popular tourist destinations on account of its scenery.

== Naming ==
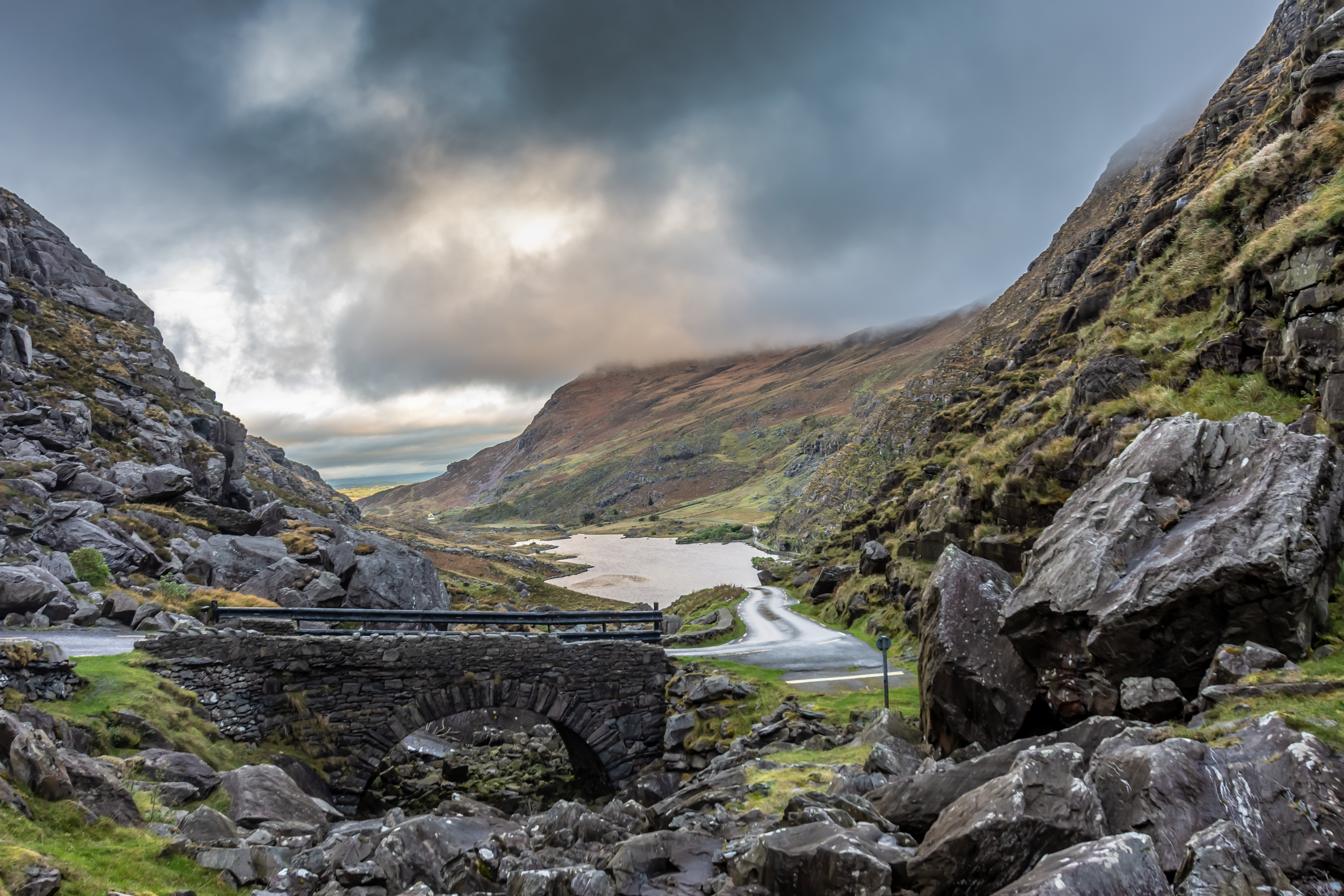
Looking northwards from the stone bridge above Augher Lake below

The term "Dunloe" is believed to be an anglicisation of the Irish term "Dún Lóich", meaning fort or stronghold of Lóich (the River Loe that runs through the Gap of Dunloe valley also derives its name from the same source). According to the Annals of Clonmacnois, Keating and the Lebor Gabála Érenn (LGE), Deala (or Dela) Mac Lóich was the father of the five chieftains of the returning Fir Bolg (Slainghe, Gann, Genann, Seangann, and Rudhraighe), who conquered Ireland and divided it into five provinces, each ruled by one brother. According to the Annals of the Four Masters, the Fir Bolg ruled Ireland for 37 years from 3266 to 3303 BCE, but were themselves defeated by the returning Tuatha Dé Danann.

== Geography ==
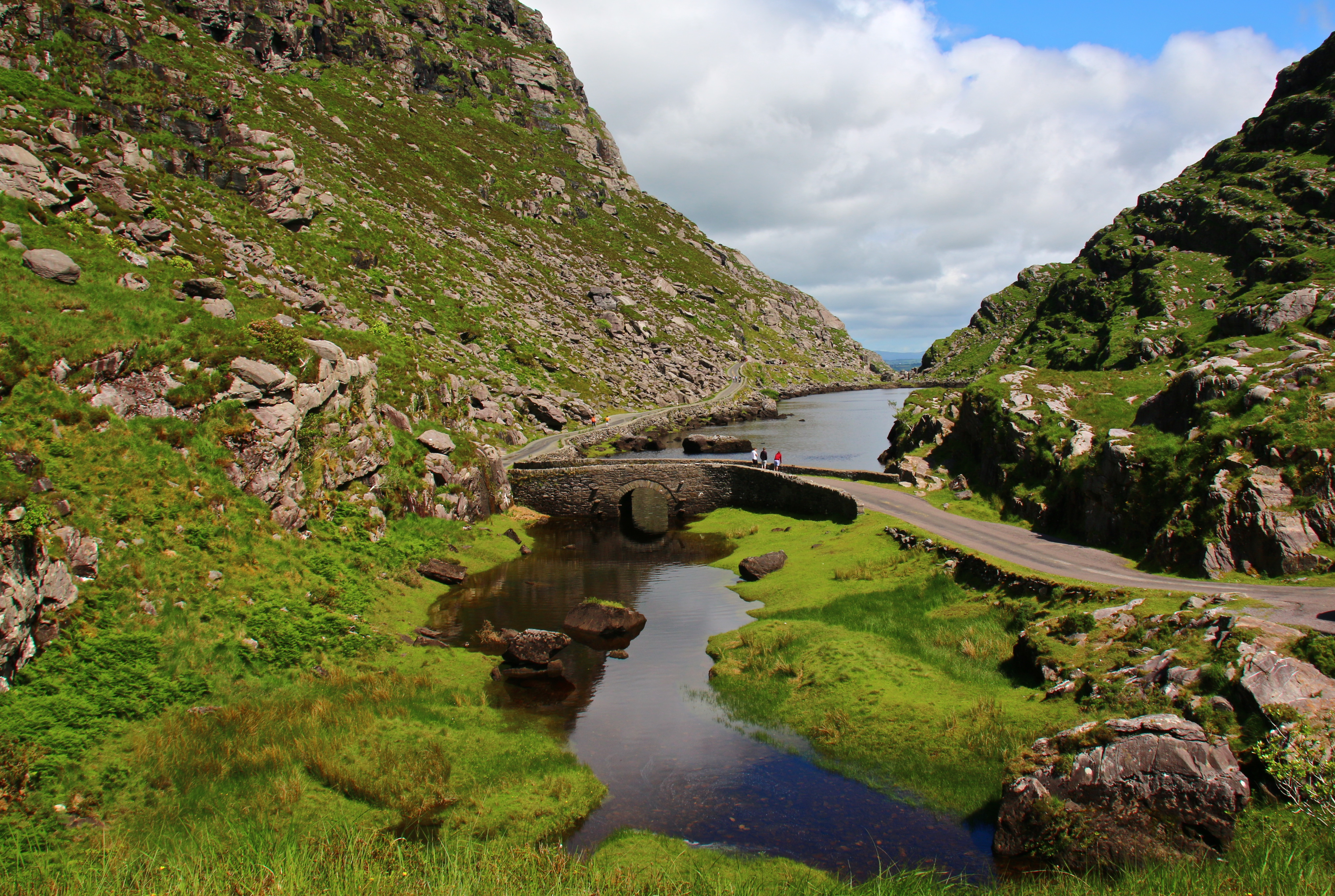
Looking northwards to the stone bridge before Black Lough

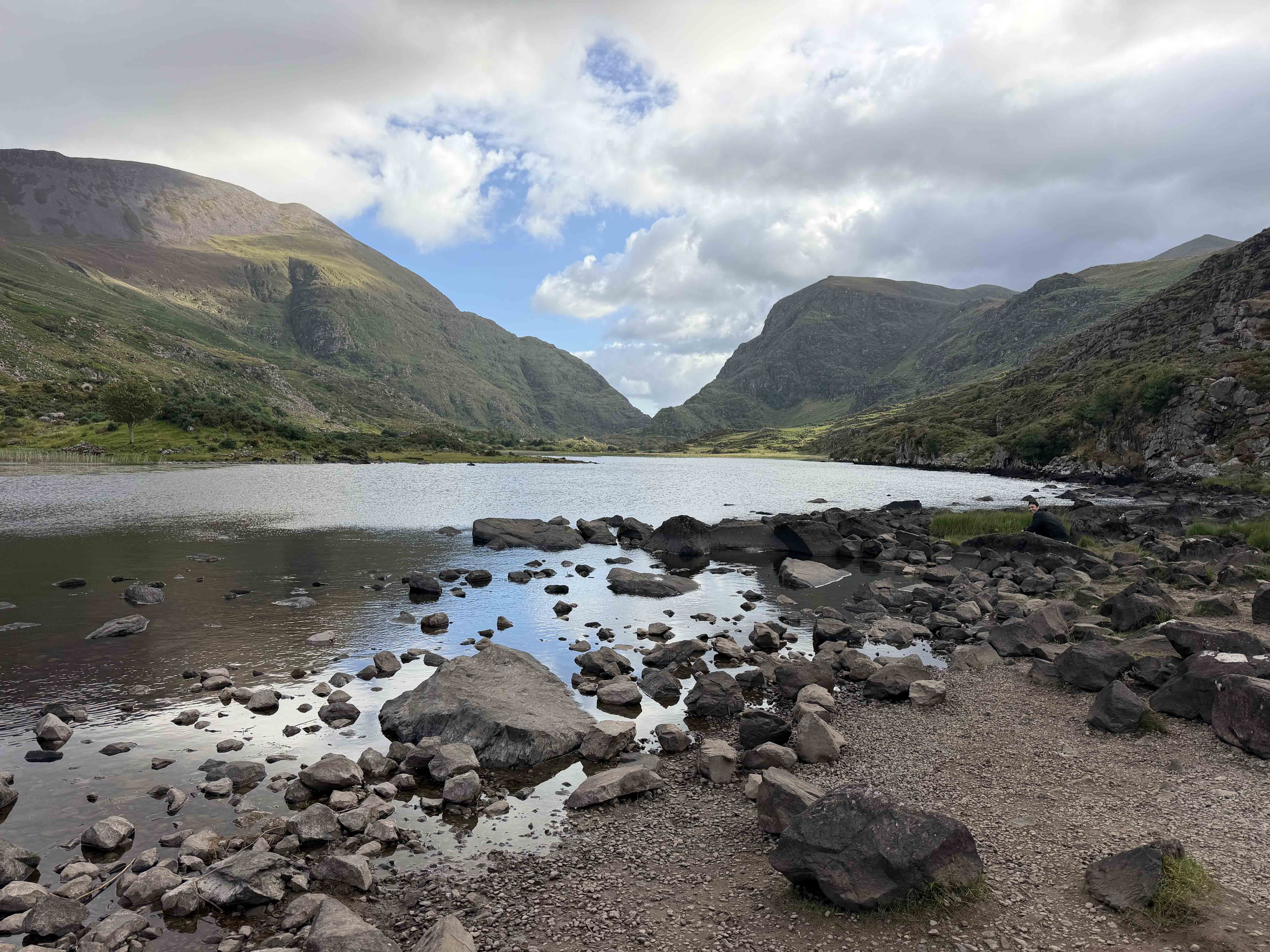
Looking south over Loch Dubh ("Black Lake"), just south of The Wishing Bridge at the Gap of Dunloe

The Gap of Dunloe was formed 25,000 years ago during Ireland's last ice age as a result of a "glacial breach" where a glacier in the Black Valley, part of the Templenoe Icecap, estimated to be over 500 metres deep, broke through the Head of the Gap and moved northwards carving out a U-shaped valley.

The pass runs north–south between the Old Red Sandstone mountain ranges of the MacGillycuddy's Reeks (to the west) and the Purple Mountain Group (to the east). The north–south road through The Gap as the area is also known, goes from Kate Kearney's Cottage in the north, to the highest point at the Head of the Gap at 241 metres (791 feet), and down to Lord Brandon's Cottage in the Black Valley in the south. The road from Kate Kearney's Cottage to Lord Brandon's Cottage is 11 kilometres (7 miles) in length, with 200 metres (650 feet) in total elevation change.

Within The Gap are five lakes (from north to south): Coosaun Lough, Loch Dubh ("Black Lake"), Cushnavally Lake, Auger Lake, and Black Lough. The lakes are connected by the River Loe. Between the first two, Coosaun Lough and Black Lake is the Wishing Bridge on which it is said that wishes made while upon it are destined to come true. The stone bridge at the northern end of Augher Lake and the stone bridge at the northern end of Black Lough are also lookout points.

== Access ==
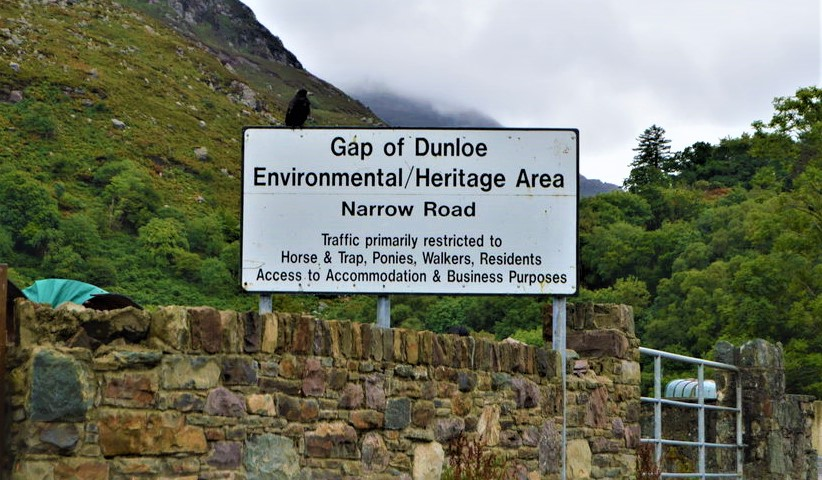
Unofficial and misleading sign erected at Kate Kearney's Cottage regarding road usage

The road through the Gap of Dunloe, from Kate Kearney's Cottage in the north, into the Black Valley in the south, is a public road, and under the charge of Kerry County Council. In 2005, private jaunting car operators were accused of preventing tourists from driving the road. Lonely Planet clarified that the road is public in its 2018 Ireland guidebook.

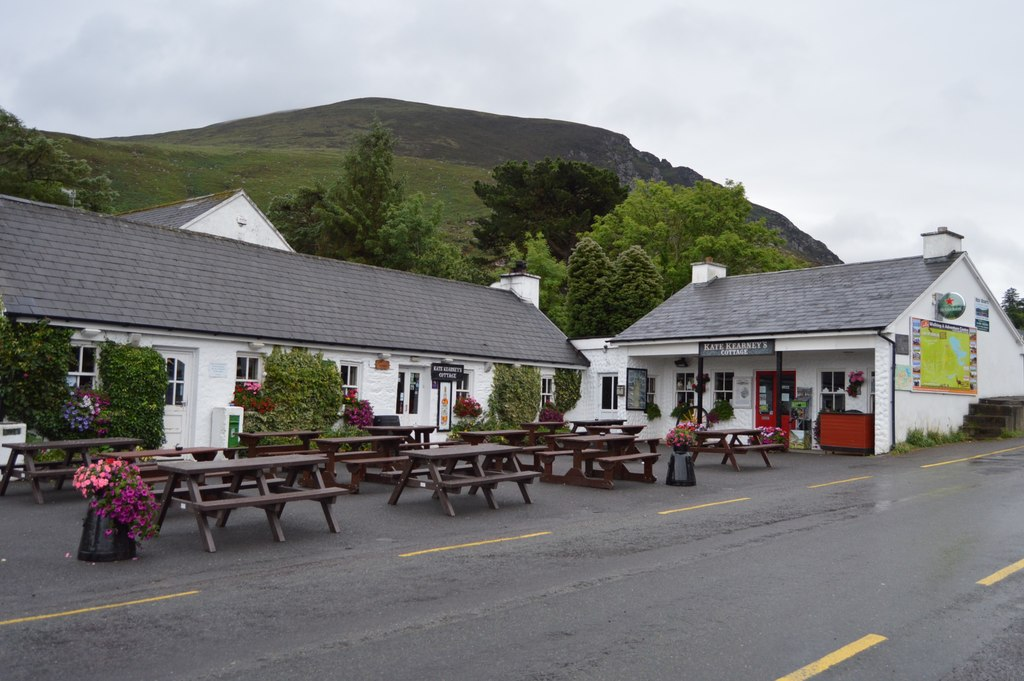
Kate Kearney's Cottage

The true Head of the Gap (at V872838), can be accessed from the north by driving past Kate Kearney's Cottage, and from the south by driving to Moll's Gap and then continuing east on the R568 road until a small side-road (at V853774, sometimes labelled "Gearhasallagh" after the townland, on maps), descends steeply north into the Black Valley and then winds its way westwards towards Lord Brandon's Cottage (which is off-route), but then diverts north to the actual Head of the Gap; this route is part of a 55–kilometre loop of the Killarney–Gap of Dunloe–Black Valley–Moll's Gap area, popular with cyclists.

As the public road through the Gap of Dunloe road reaches the Head of the Gap it becomes narrow and winding and is difficult for vehicles to pass, which has led to concerns over safety; there have been fatalities over the years of cyclists. There have also been fatalities of tourists in jaunting cars.

== Climbing and walking ==
=== Hill walking ===
The mountain ranges on either side of The Gap (MacGillycuddy's Reeks to the west, and Purple Mountain Group to the east), are common hill walking routes (some routes are discussed in more detail in their respective articles). The walk from Kate Kearney's Cottage (at V872838), to the full Head of the Gap (at V872838) is 6 kilometres and takes circa 1 hour (and another hour for the return journey back to Kate Kearney's Cottage).

=== Rock climbing ===
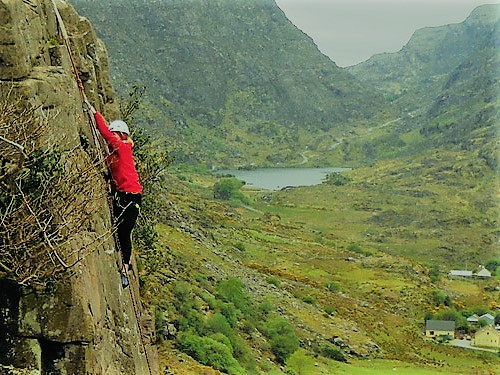
Rock climbing on Bothán with Augher Lake in the background.

While not as well known as other Irish rock climbing locations (like Ailladie, Fair Head or Dalkey Quarry), various Old Red Sandstone cliffs and crags along the Gap of Dunloe are used as locations for rock climbing, and over 107 routes are listed and graded in the Irish Climbing Online Wiki.

There are only two crags on the east side of the valley, namely Céim and Bothán, with most of the crags being in the north-west side of the valley, near Brennan's Leap (the cliff at the western shore of Coosaun Lough) / the Wishing Bridge (the stone bridge between Coosaun Lough and Black Lake). Grades range from V–Diff to E5 6b (Far Away Friends 10 m E5 6b, Cub Crag), with The Main Face crag having some of the longest +30 metre higher E–grade climbs (including Demasiado 40 m E1 5b, 5a), and Jigzaw Wall having short but also some of the hardest climbs in the valley.

The Gap was ranked as one of the "top 5 areas" for bouldering in Ireland, including The Main Face crag, with grades of up to 7b.

== Climbing bibliography ==
Hill walking:

- Fairbairn, Helen (2014). Ireland's Best Walks: A Walking Guide. Collins Press. ISBN 978-1848892118.
- MountainViews (Simon Stewart) (2013). A Guide to Ireland's Mountain Summits: The Vandeleur-Lynams & the Arderins. Collins Books. ISBN 978-1-84889-164-7.
- Ryan, Jim (2006). Carrauntoohil and MacGillycuddy's Reeks: A Walking Guide to Ireland's Highest Mountains. Collins Press. ISBN 978-1905172337.
- Dillion, Paddy (1993). The Mountains of Ireland: A Guide to Walking the Summits. Cicerone. ISBN 978-1852841102.

Rock climbing:

- Richard, Creagh; Richard, Stack (25 January 2014). Gap of Dunloe Rock Climbing Guide (PDF).
- Flanagan, David (2014). Rock Climbing in Ireland. Three Rock Books. ISBN 978-0956787422.

== Gallery ==
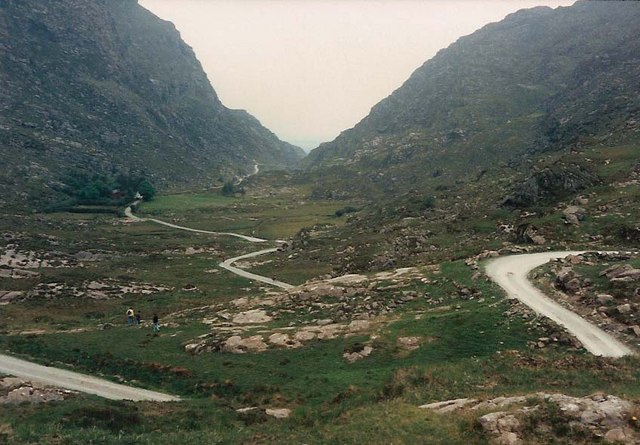
At the Head of the Gap (highest point) looking northwards

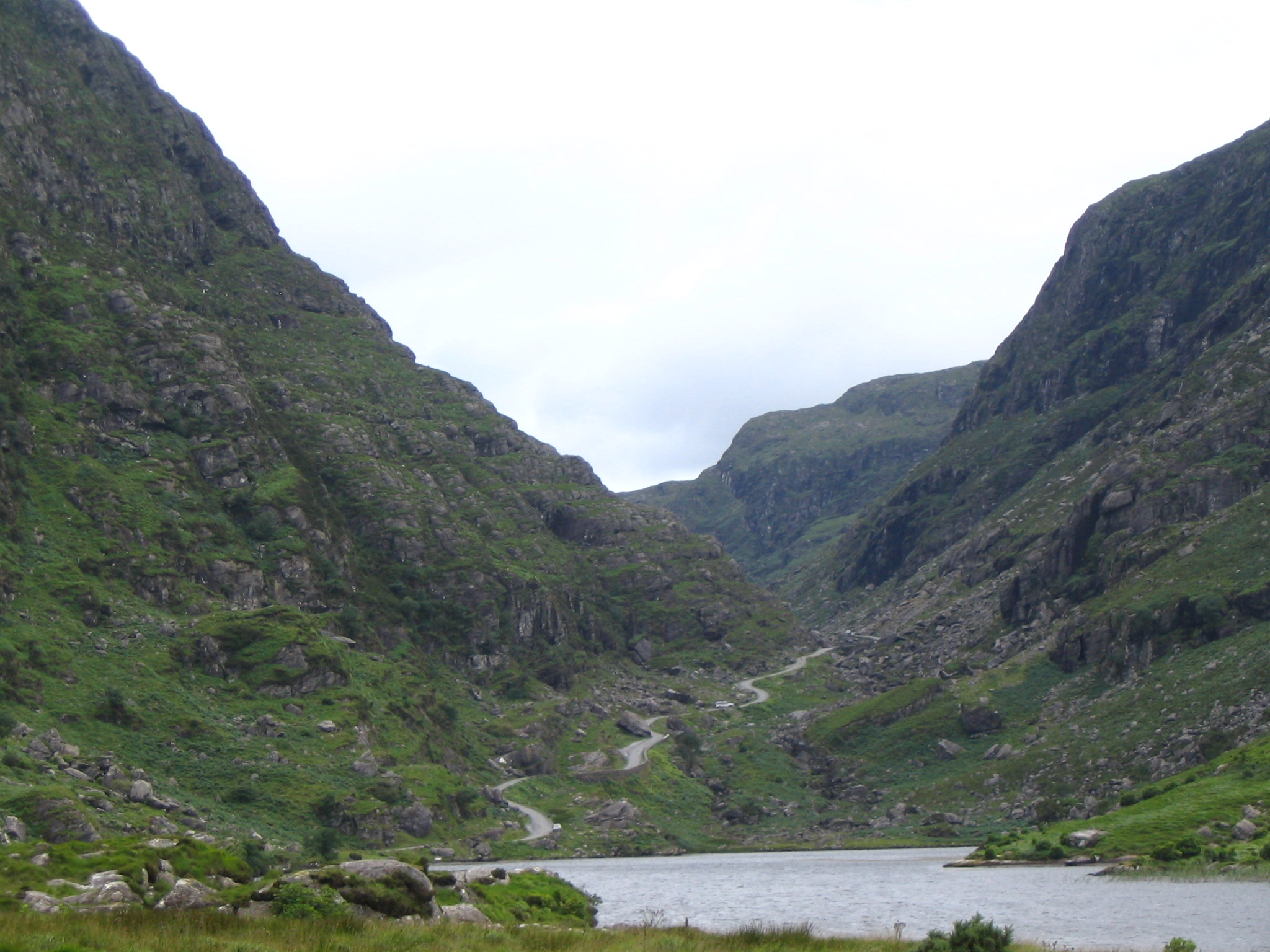
Looking southwards across Augher Lake up into the Head of the Gap

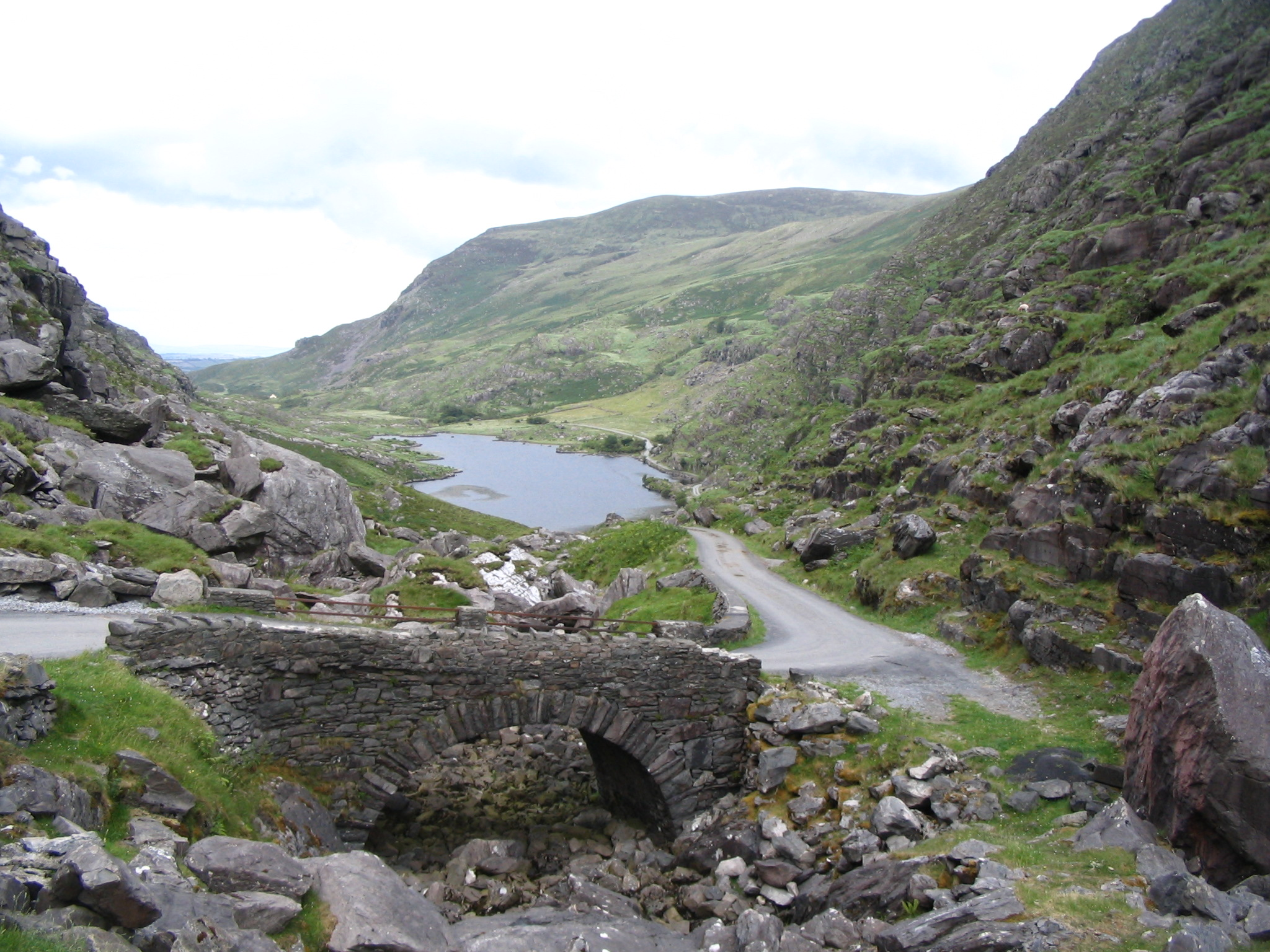
Looking northwards at the road down to Augher Lake

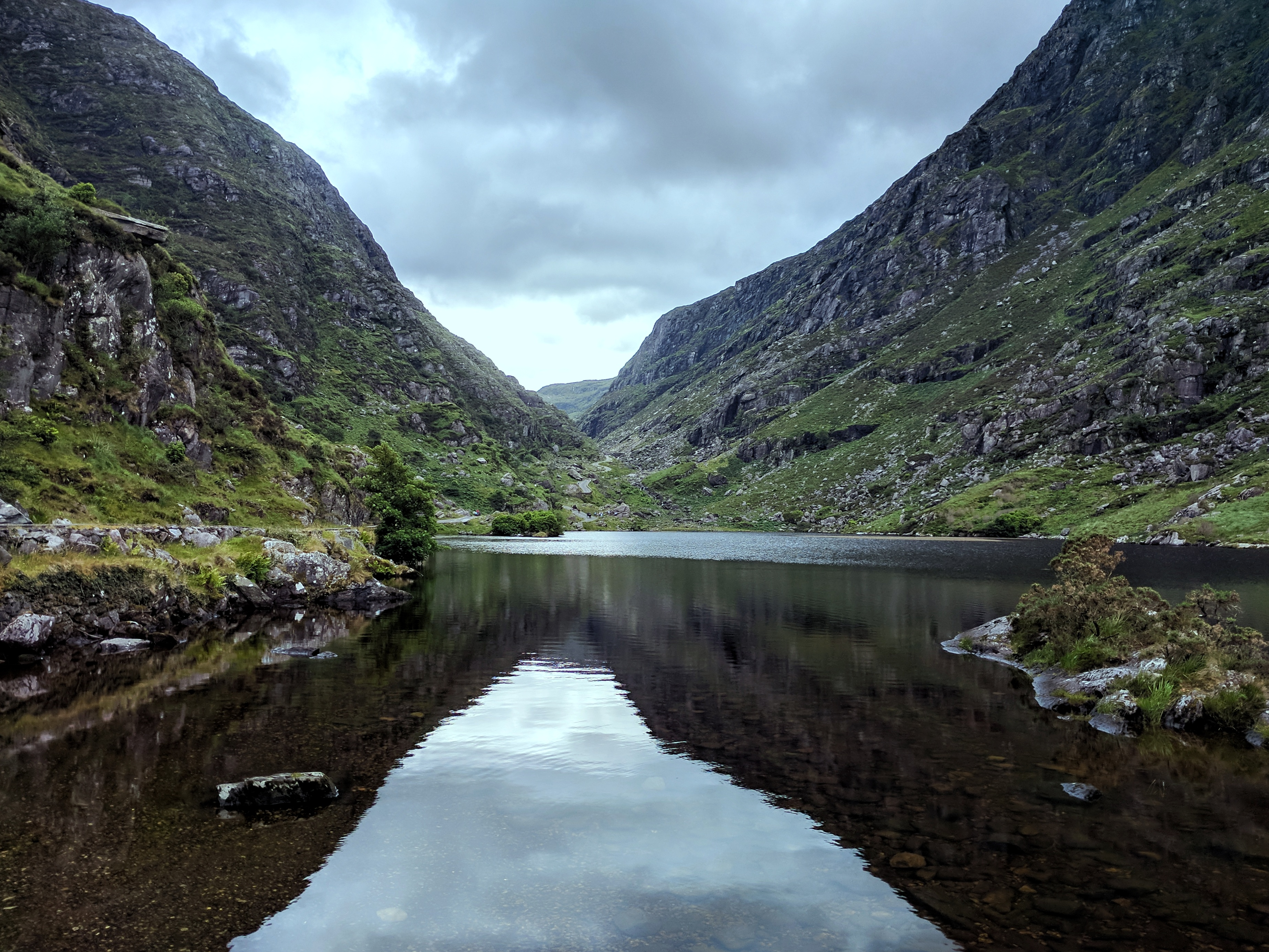
Looking southwards across Augher Lake up into the Head of the Gap

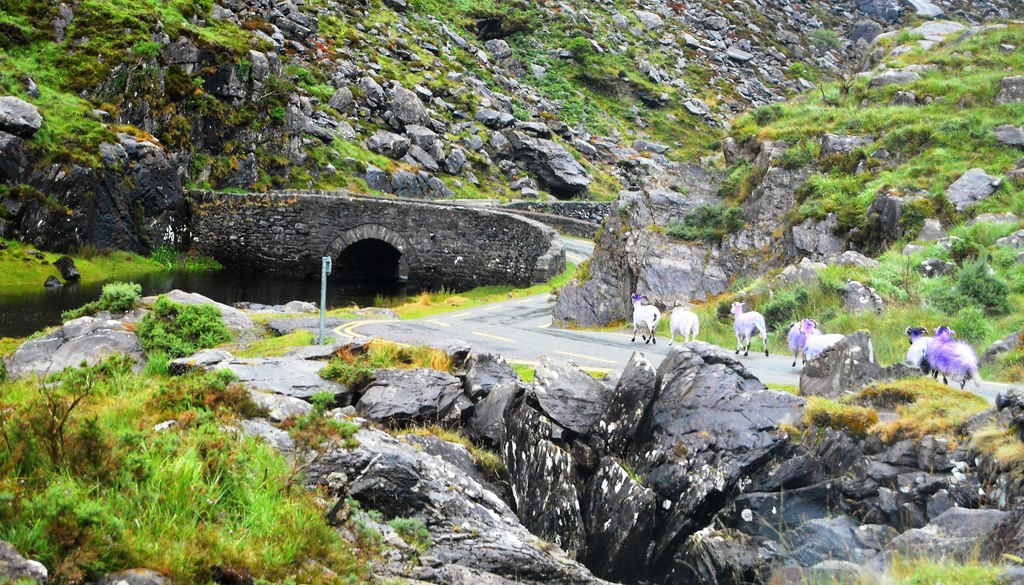
Looking northwards to the stone bridge before Black Lough

== See also ==
- Ailladie, major rock climbing limestone sea-cliff in County Clare
- Fair Head, major rock climbing dolerite mountain crag in County Antrim
- Dalkey Quarry, major rock climbing granite quarry in Dublin
- Purple Mountain Group, mountain range to the east of The Gap
- MacGillycuddy's Reeks, mountain range to the west of The Gap
