= O'Connell (name) =

- Language: Irish: Ó Conaill

Origin
- Meaning: O'Connell: "descendant of Conall"
- Region of origin: Ireland

Other names
- Variant form: Conall

O'Connell is a noble surname of Irish origin. It is an anglicisation of the Irish Ó Conaill (meaning "descendant of Conall"). The personal name Conall is composed of the elements con (from cú meaning "hound") and gal (meaning "valour"). The O'Connell family were a noted clan of Ballycarbery Castle, Munster.

== Surname ==
- Aaron D. O'Connell (born 1981), American experimental quantum physicist, creator of the world's first quantum machine
- Aaron O'Connell (born 1986), American model and actor
- Aidan O'Connell (born 1998), American football player
- Anthony O'Connell (1938–2012), American Catholic bishop
- Arthur O'Connell (1908–1981), American actor
- Bill O'Connell (musician)
- Bill O'Connell (rugby union)
- Billie Eilish O'Connell, known as Billie Eilish (born 2001), American singer and songwriter
- Beverly Reid O'Connell (1965–2017), American judge
- Carlos O'Connell (born 1963), Irish decathlete
- Charlie O'Connell (disambiguation), multiple people
- Christian O'Connell (born 1973), English radio DJ
- Conall O'Connell, senior Australian public servant
- Dáithí Ó Conaill (David O'Connell) (1938–1991), Irish republican
- Daniel O'Connell (1775–1847), Irish politician
- Daniel P. O'Connell (1885–1977), American politician from New York
- David O'Connell (disambiguation), multiple people
- Denis J. O'Connell (1849–1927), American Catholic bishop
- Eileen O'Connell (Irish writer) (c.1743–c.1800), Irish poet
- Eileen O'Connell (politician) (1947–2000), Canadian politician, member of the Nova Scotia House of Assembly
- Finneas O'Connell (born 1997), American actor and musician; brother of Billie Eilish
- Frédérique Émilie Auguste O'Connell (1823–1885) German–French painter
- Grace O’Connell, American bioengineer
- Helen O'Connell (1920–1993), American singer, actress, and dancer
- Helen O'Connell (urologist) (born 1962), Australian urologist
- Jack O'Connell (disambiguation), multiple people
- Jason O'Connell, Welsh politician
- Jerry O'Connell (born 1974), American actor
- Joe O'Connell (disambiguation), multiple people
- John O'Connell (disambiguation), multiple people
- Joseph O'Connell (disambiguation), multiple people
- Julie O'Connell (born 1959), New Zealand lawn bowler
- Kevin O'Connell (born 1985), American football coach
- Maeve O'Connell, Irish politician
- Martin O'Connell (disambiguation), multiple people
- Maura O'Connell (born (1958), Irish singer and actress, singer
- Maurice O'Connell (disambiguation), multiple people
- Muireann O'Connell, (born 1983), Irish broadcaster
- Max O'Connell (born 1936), Australian cricket umpire
- Mick O'Connell (born 1937), Irish footballer
- Millie O'Connell (born 1997) British Theatre actress and singer
- Mike O'Connell (born 1955), American ice hockey player and general manager
- Paddy or Pat or Patrick O'Connell (disambiguation), multiple people
- Paul O'Connell (born 1979), Irish rugby player
- Ryan O'Connell (born 1986), American writer, actor, and producer
- Sarah O'Connell, New Zealand runholder
- Stephen C. O'Connell (1916–2001), Florida Supreme Court justice (1955–1967), president of the University of Florida (1967–1973)
- Taaffe O'Connell (born 1951), American actress and publisher
- Terri O'Connell (born 1964), American motor racing driver and transgender
- Thomas J. O'Connell (1882–1969), Irish politician
- William O'Connell (disambiguation), multiple people

== See also ==
- O'Connell of Derrynane, Gaelic Irish noble family
- O'Connell baronets

== Given name ==
- William O'Connell Bradley (1847–1914), U.S. Senator from Kentucky
- Conal Holmes O'Connell O'Riordan (1874–1948), Irish dramatist and novelist

== Fictional characters ==
- Rick O'Connell, main character in American The Mummy films
- Maggie O'Connell, in American television series Northern Exposure
- Camille O’Connell, in American television series The Originals
- Brian O'Connal main character in Canadian Novel Who Has Seen The Wind
- Ocean O'Connell Rosenberg in Canadian musical Ride The Cyclone
