= James Connell =

James Connell may refer to:

- James C. Connell (1897–1973), American federal judge
- James J. Connell (1939–1971), American naval aviator, recipient of the Navy Cross
- James Connell (lawyer), human rights attorney
- Jim Connell (footballer) (James David Connell, born 1951), see List of Bury F.C. players (1–24 appearances)

== See also ==
- Jim Connell (1852–1929), Irish political activist
- James O'Connell (disambiguation)
- Jimmy O'Connell (disambiguation)
