= James O'Connell =

James O'Connell may refer to:

- Sir James O'Connell, 1st Baronet (1786–1872), Irish baronet
- James Dunne O'Connell (1899–1984), American army general, chief of Signal Corps
- James F. O'Connell (long jumper) (1882–1942), American Olympic athlete
- James F. O'Connell, professor of anthropology
- James T. O'Connell, American businessman and government official
- James O'Connell (unionist) (1858–1936), American labor union leader

== See also ==
- Jimmy O'Connell (disambiguation)
- James Connell (disambiguation)
