= Sarah Connolly (disambiguation) =

Sarah Connolly (born 1963) is an English mezzo-soprano.

Sarah Connolly may also refer to one of the following:

- Sarah A. Connolly, American virologist
- Sarah Connolly (politician), Australian Labor Party politician
- Sarah Sugden (also Connolly), fictional character in British soap opera Emmerdale

== See also ==
- Sarah O'Connell (1822?–1870), New Zealand runholder
