= Royal Swedish Regiment (France) =

- Régiment Royal Suédois
- Active: 1690–1791; 1813–December 1814
- Country: Kingdom of France
- Branch: French Royal Army (1690-1791); Swedish Army (1813-1814)
- Type: Foreign volunteer regiment
- Engagements: Nine Years' War; War of Spanish Succession; War of Polish Succession; War of Austrian Succession; Seven Years' War; American Revolutionary War; War of the Sixth Coalition: Battle of Leipzig; Swedish–Norwegian War

The Régiment Royal Suédois (English: Royal Swedish Regiment) was a foreign infantry regiment in the Royal French Army during the Ancien Régime. It was created in 1690 from Swedish prisoners taken during the Battle of Fleurus. The regiment eventually acquired the privilege of being called a Royal regiment.

== German regiment ==
The regiment nominally accepted only Swedish officers. However most of the privates and NCOs were of German origin, from Swedish Pomerania, in view of the difficulty of obtaining sufficient numbers of Swedish recruits, and at least one Irishman, Daniel Charles O'Connell, was a lieutenant colonel in the regiment.

The actual Swedish element in the regiment diminished after 1740. Between 1741 and 1749 only one of the 438 men enlisted was actually Swedish. By 1754 even the officer corps numbered only 14 Swedes out of a total of 41. In spite of its origins and connections the Royal-Suedois came to be ranked as a German regiment.

Count Axel von Fersen purchased the position of colonel-proprietor of the regiment in 1783, according to some in order to be able to stay close to the Queen of France Marie Antoinette. He remained in active command of the regiment until the beginning of the French Revolution in 1789, and officially this was still the case when, in 1791, all non-Swiss foreign regiments of the royal army lost their traditional titles and status. The regiment was then reorganised as the new 89th Regiment of the Line.

== Regimental title ==
Initially named the Lenck Regiment, the unit was renamed as the Appelgrehn Regiment in 1734. These titles were both names of the successive regimental colonels, following the usual French Army practice of the period. However, in 1742 the Swedish government requested that the regiment be given the distinction of being renamed Royal-Suedois.

== Colours ==
King’s Colours and Regimental Colours

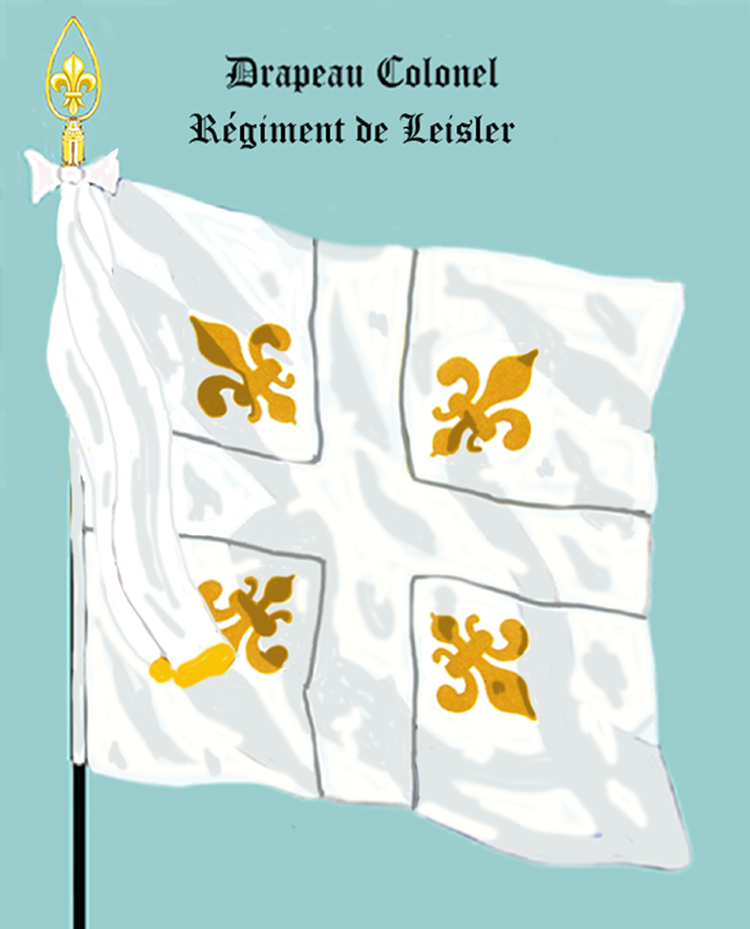
King’s Colour 1690 to 1760

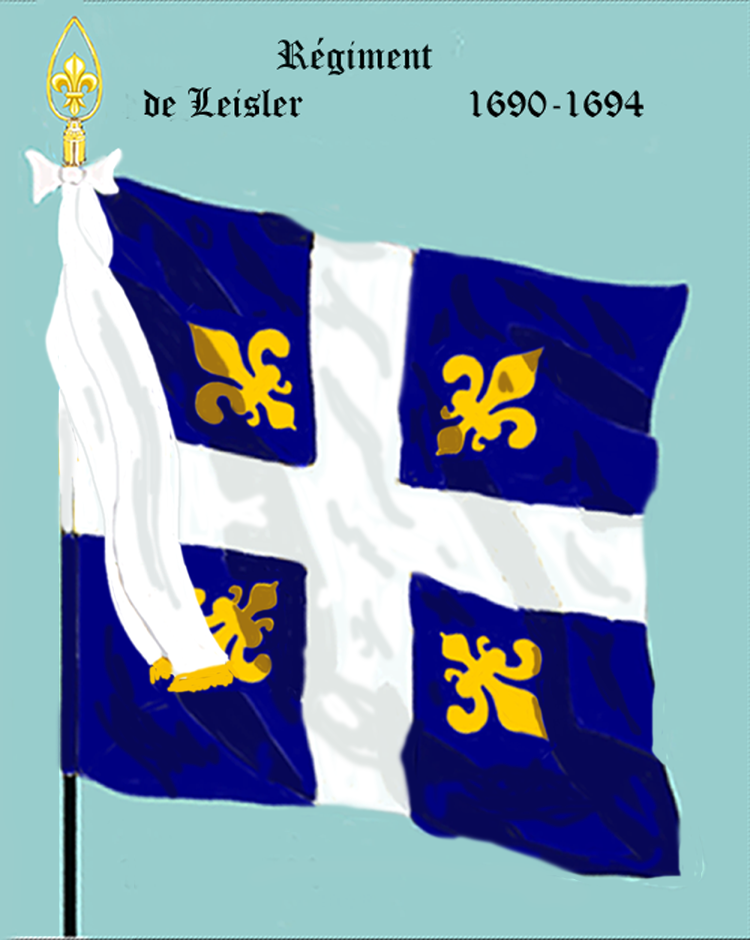
régiment de Leisler 1690 to 1694

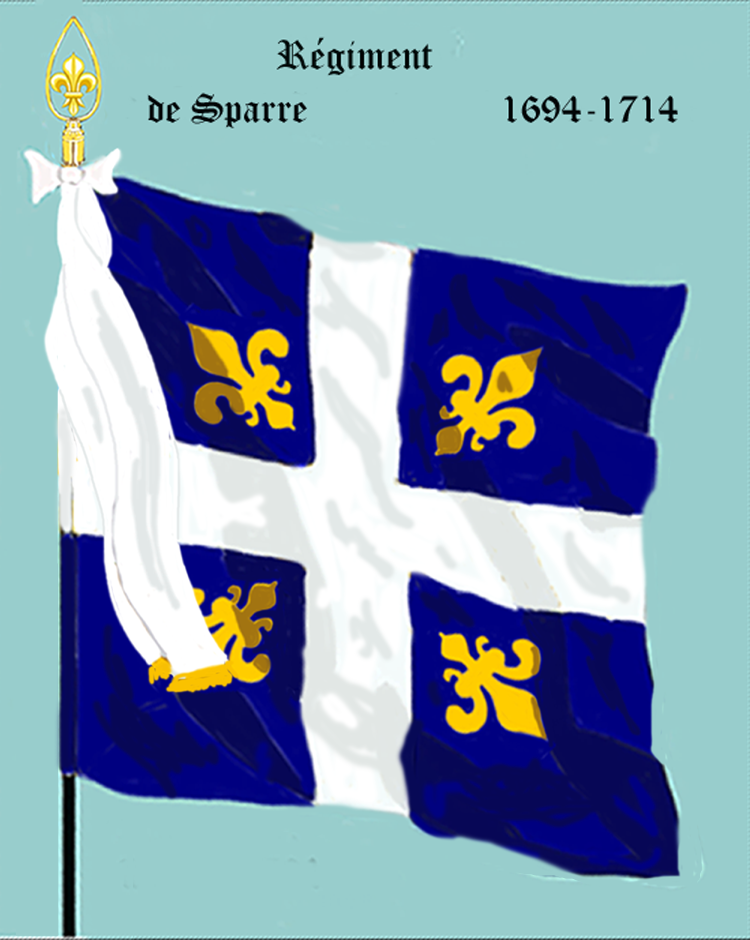
régiment de Sparre 1694 to 1714

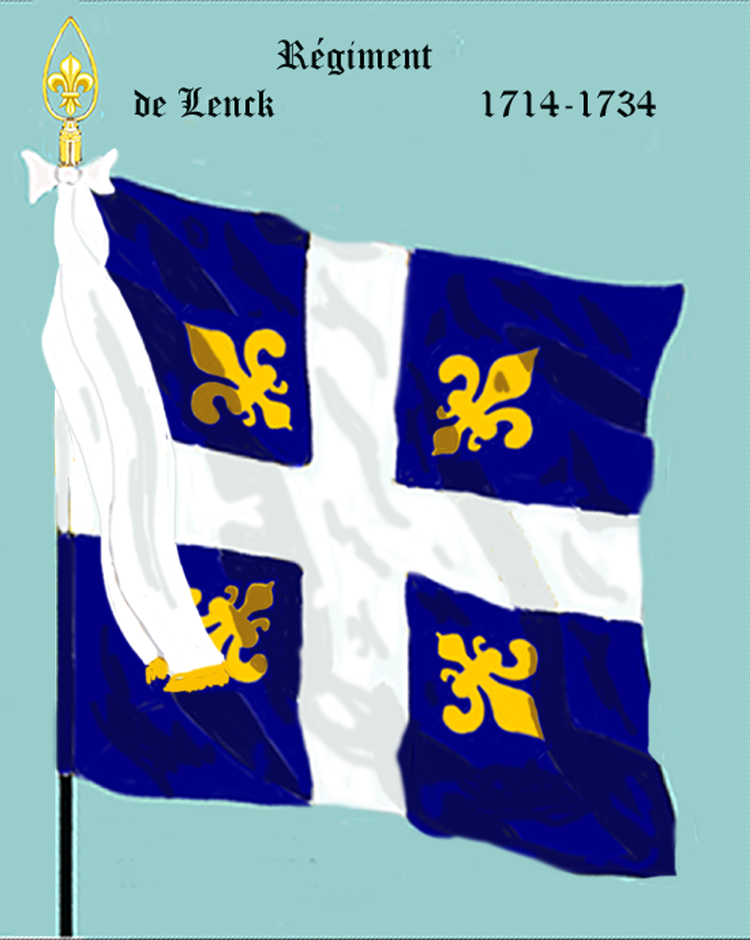
régiment de Lenck 1714 to 1734
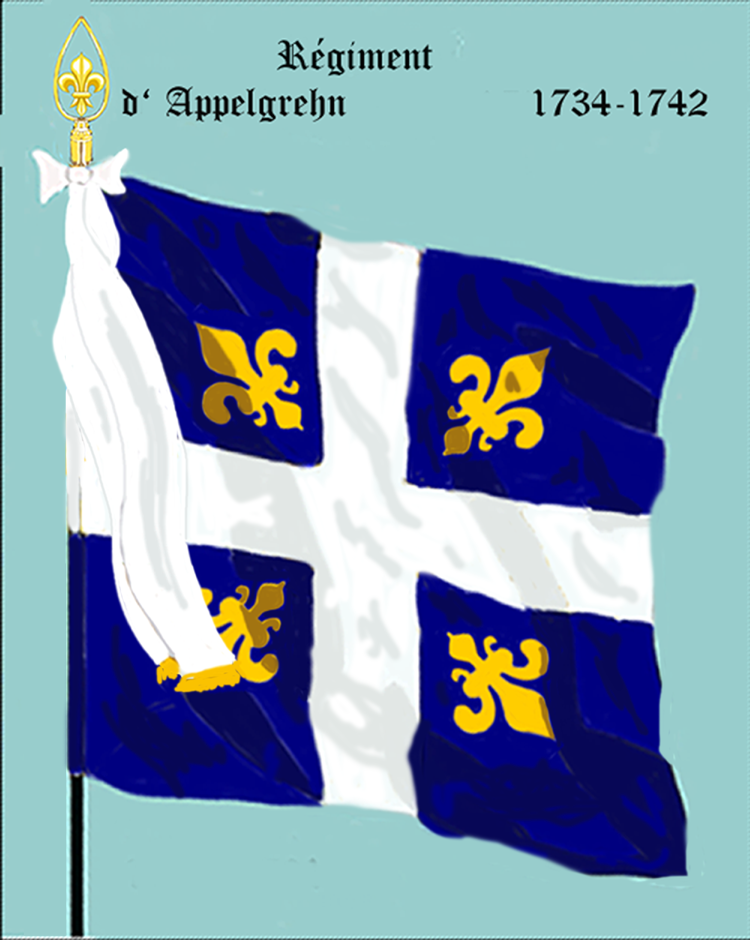
régiment d’Appelgrehn 1734 to 1742

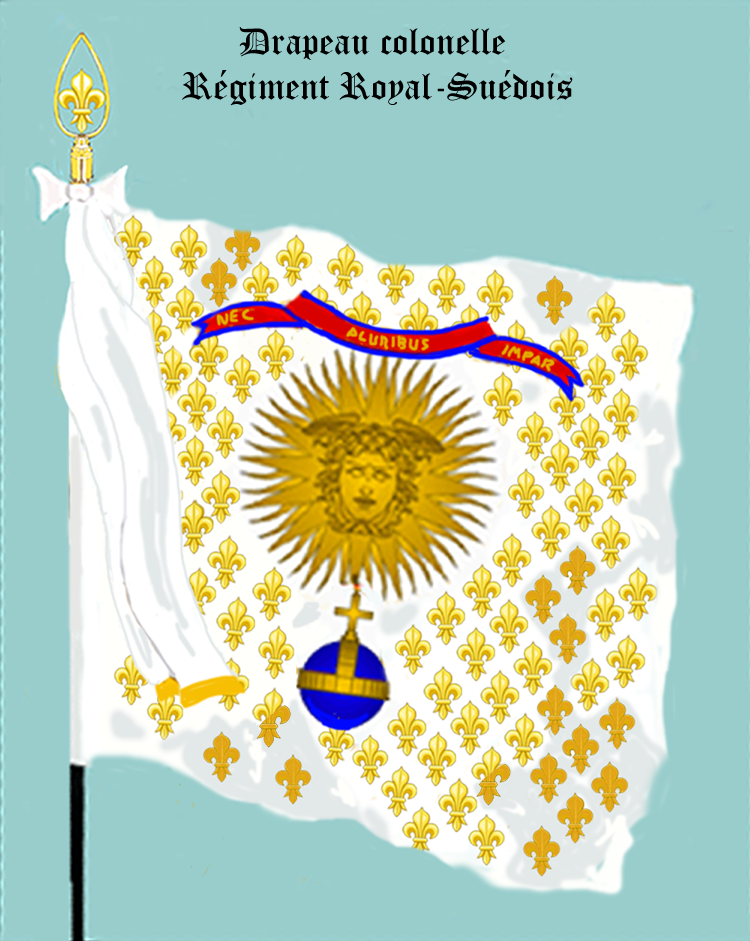
King’s Colour 1760 to 1790

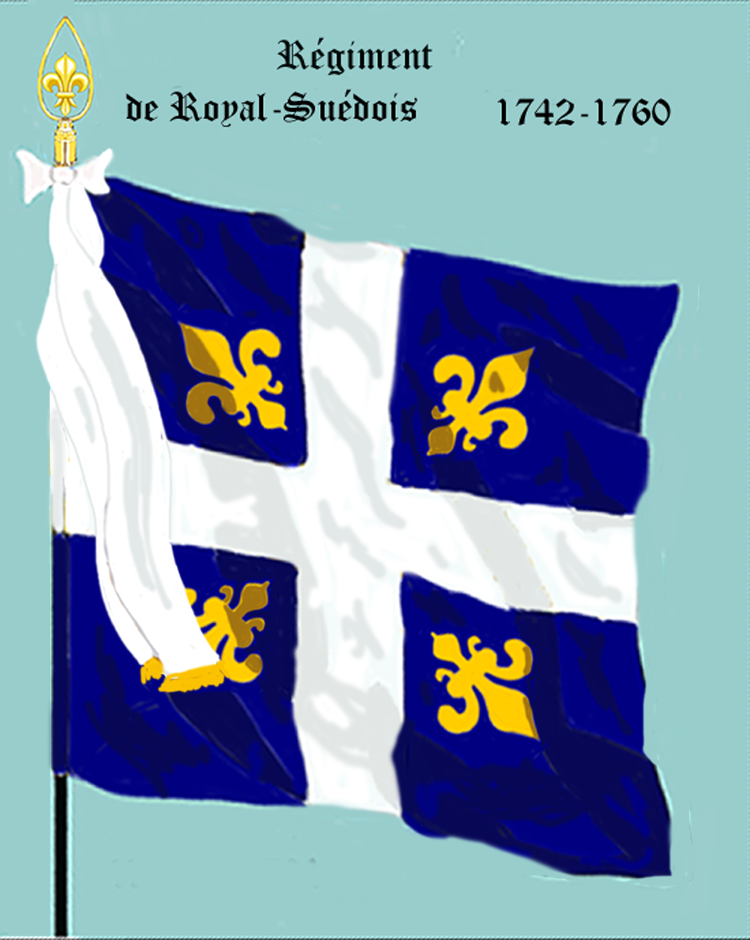
régiment Royal-Suédois 1742 to 1760

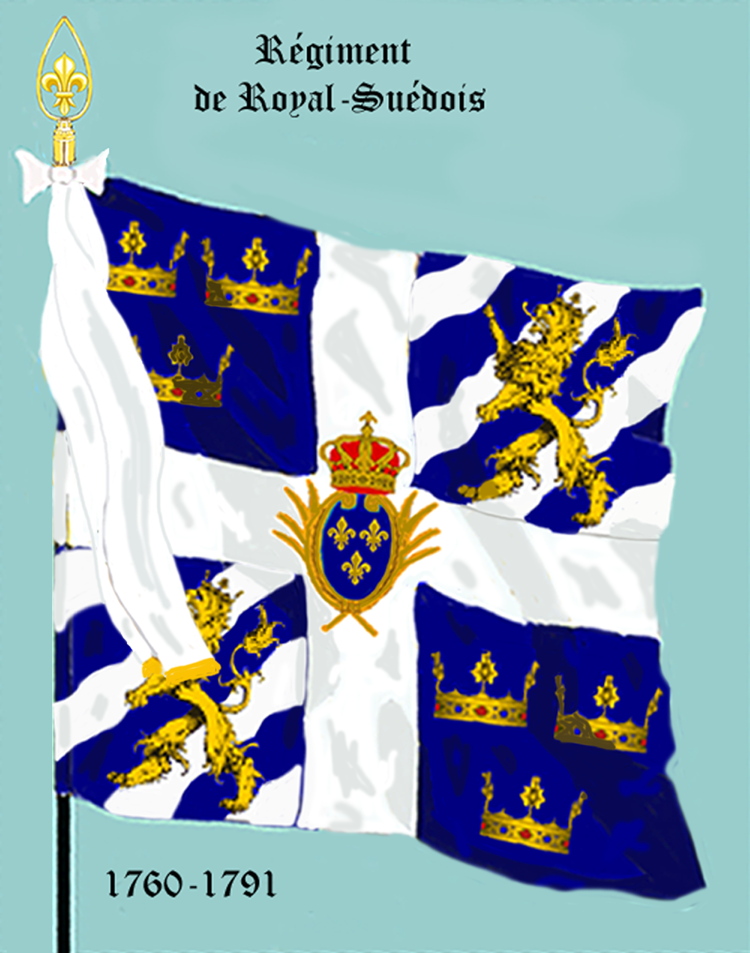
régiment Royal-Suédois 1760 to 1790

== Uniforms ==
From about 1750 onwards the regiment was distinguished by wearing dark blue coats with buff (yellow-brown) collars and cuffs. This colour combination matched the uniform of most infantry regiments in the Swedish Army from the 17th to the early 20th centuries.

Uniforms

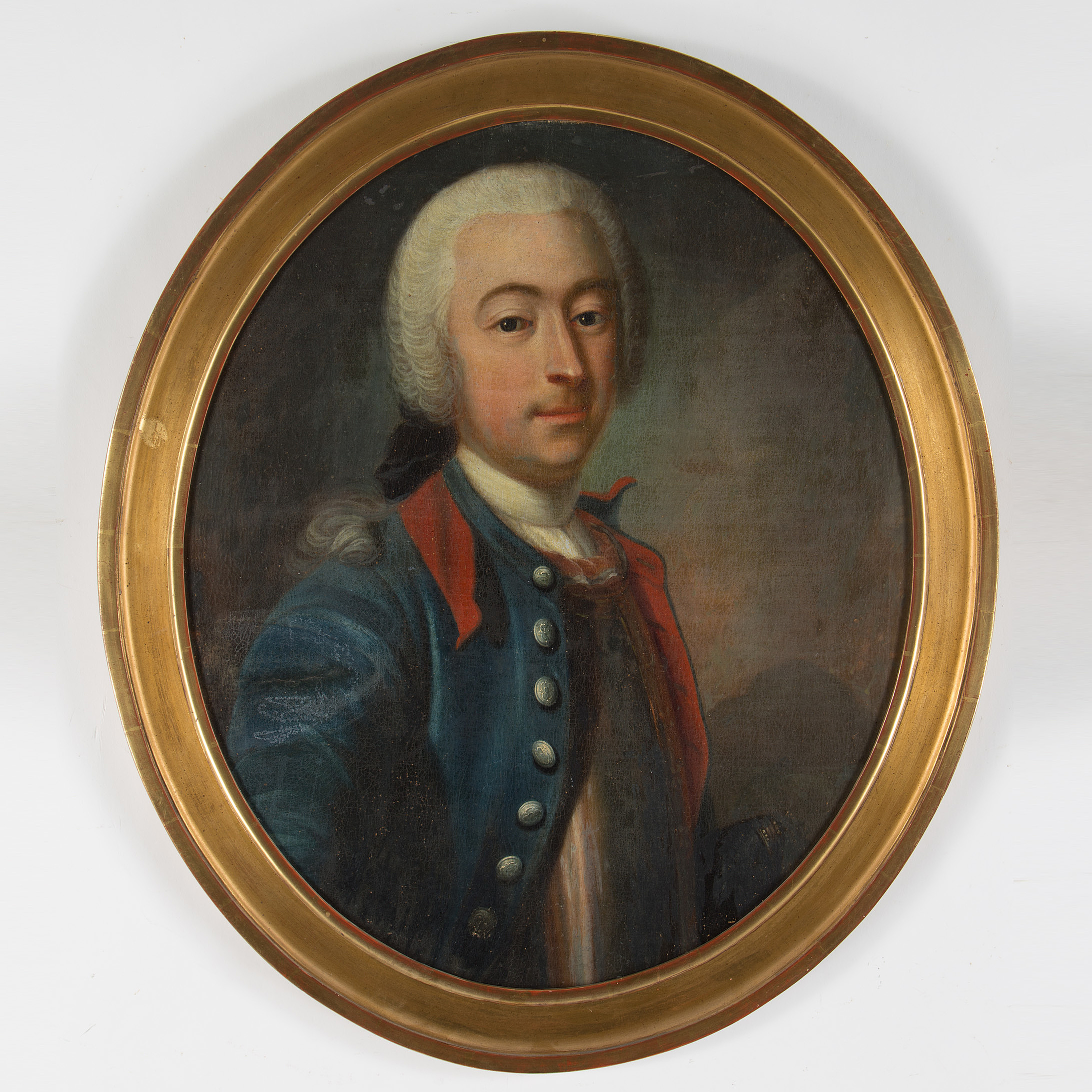
Johan Cronhielm in the uniform of régiment, Lenck, ca 1730

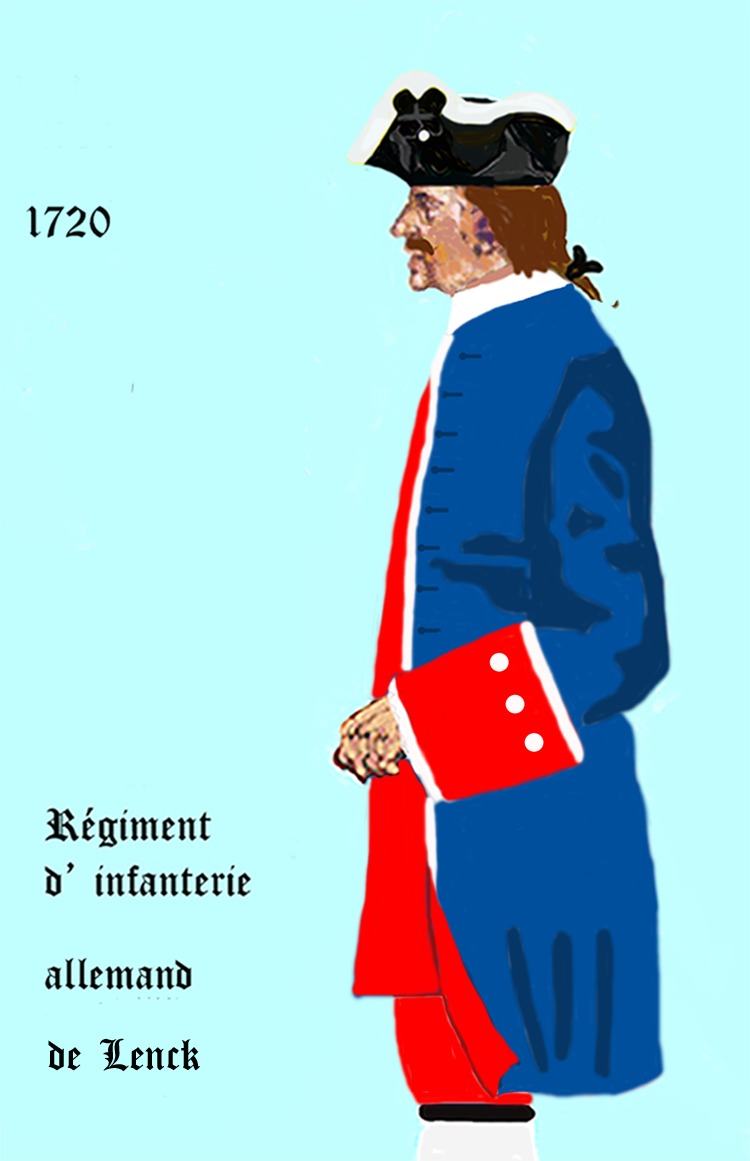
régiment Lenck, 1729 to 1734

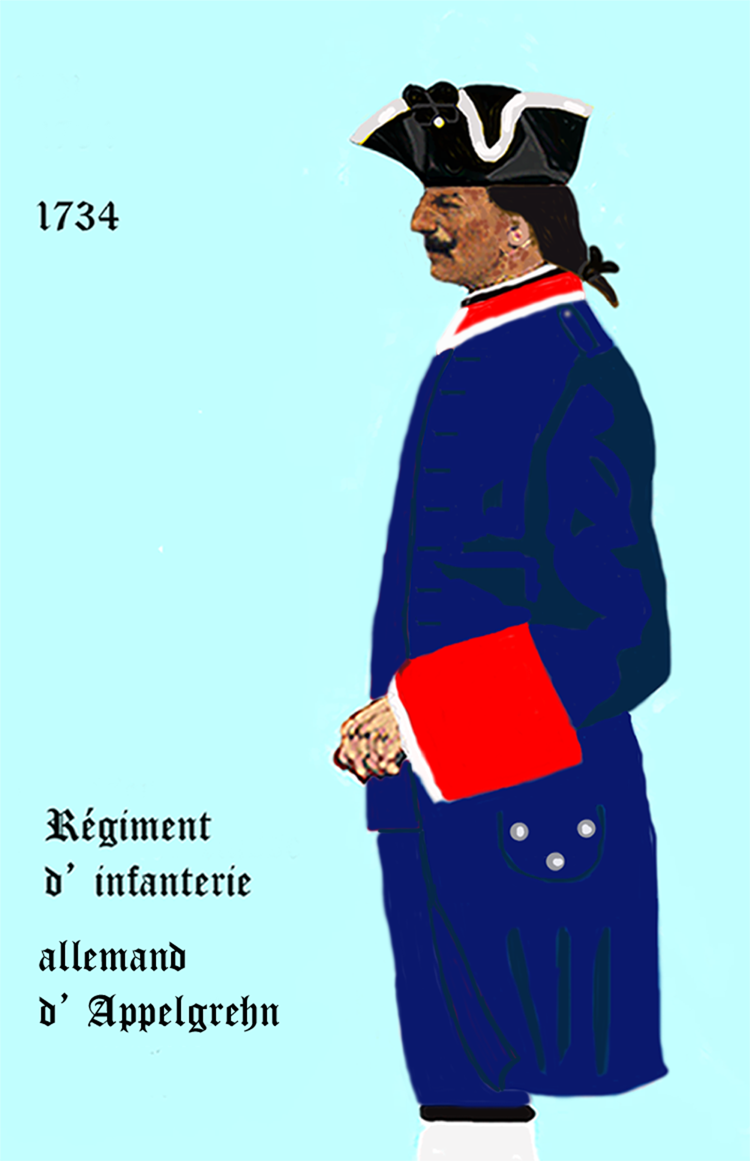
regiment Appelgrehn, 1734 to 1742

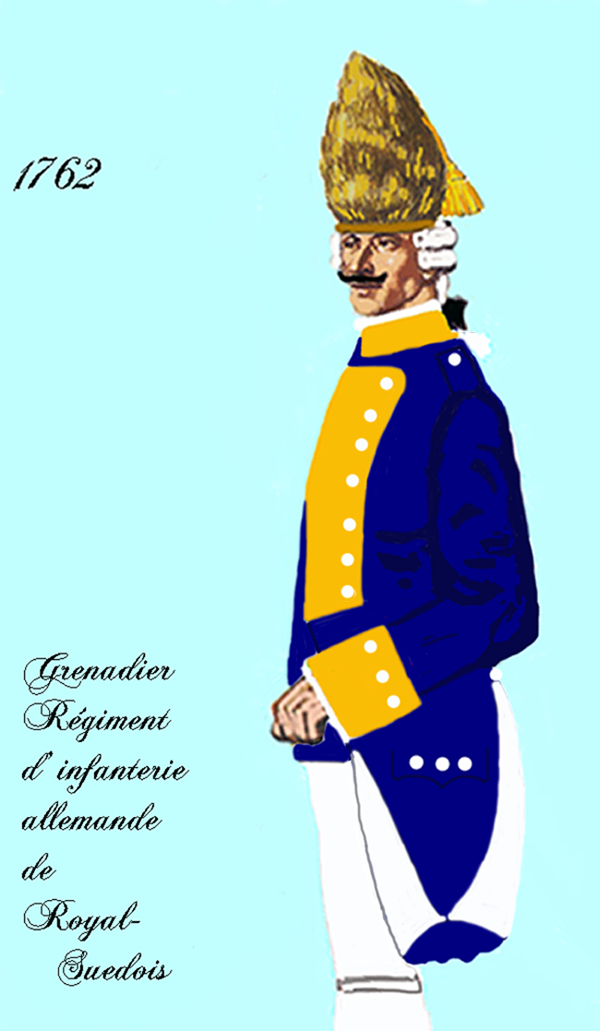
Grenadier of régiment Royal-Suédois, 1762 to 1776

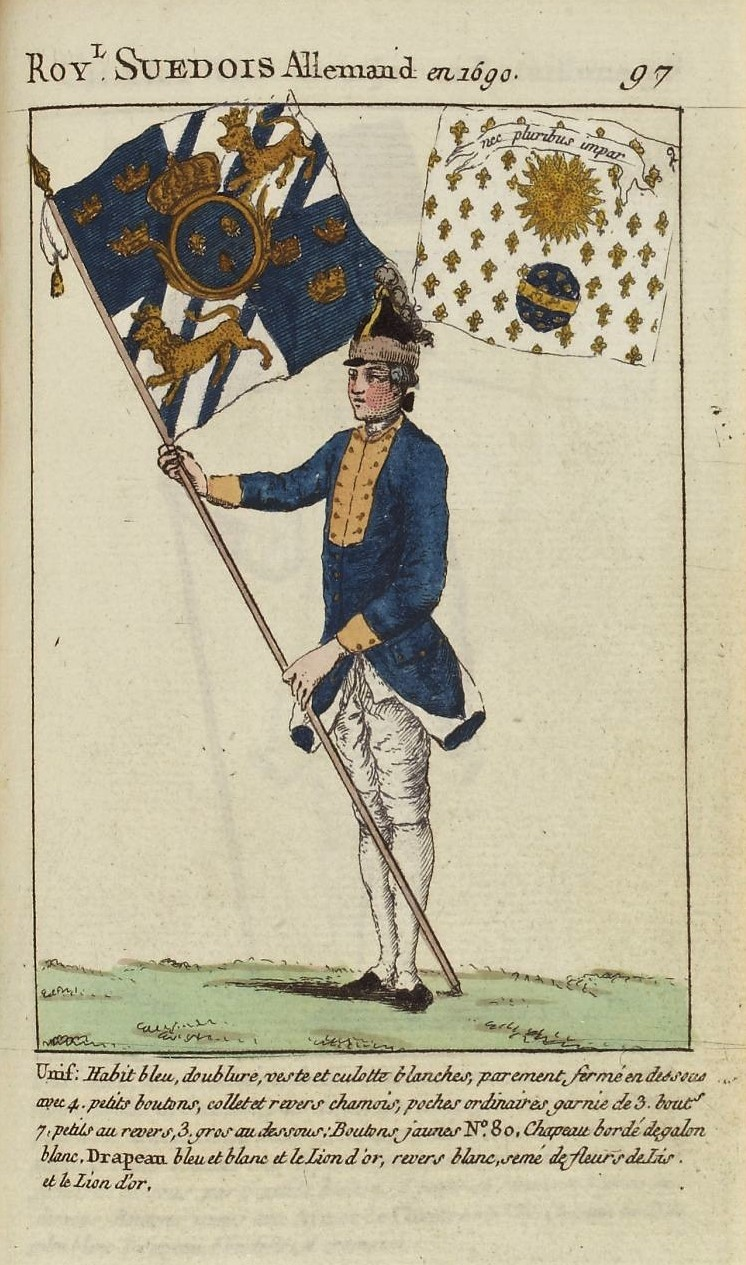
régiment Royal-Suédois in 1772

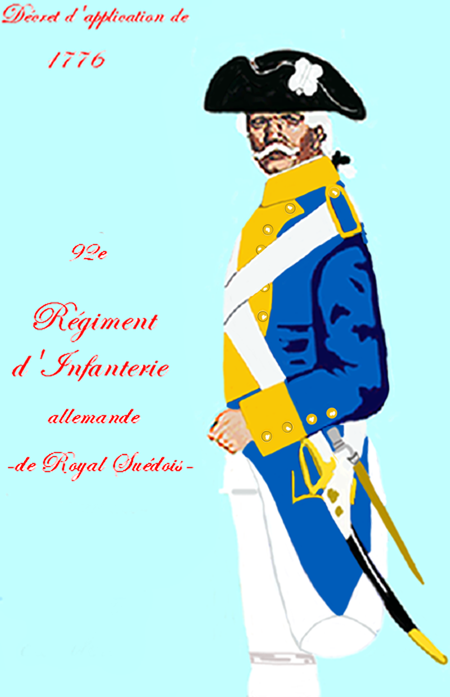
régiment Royal-Suédois, from 1776

== Swedish regiment ==
In December 1813, the regiment was once again raised by a French émigré in Germany, and it fought in the Swedish Army during the Battle of Leipzig in 1813 and during the campaign in Norway in 1814. The Royal Suédois was finally disbanded in December 1814 while in Norway.

== Traditions ==
Today, the regiment's traditions and flag are carried on in the French Army via a company in the 4th Infantry Regiment.

== See also ==
- List of Royal French foreign regiments
