= O'Connell family of Derrynane =

Gaelic Irish family of County Kerry, Ireland

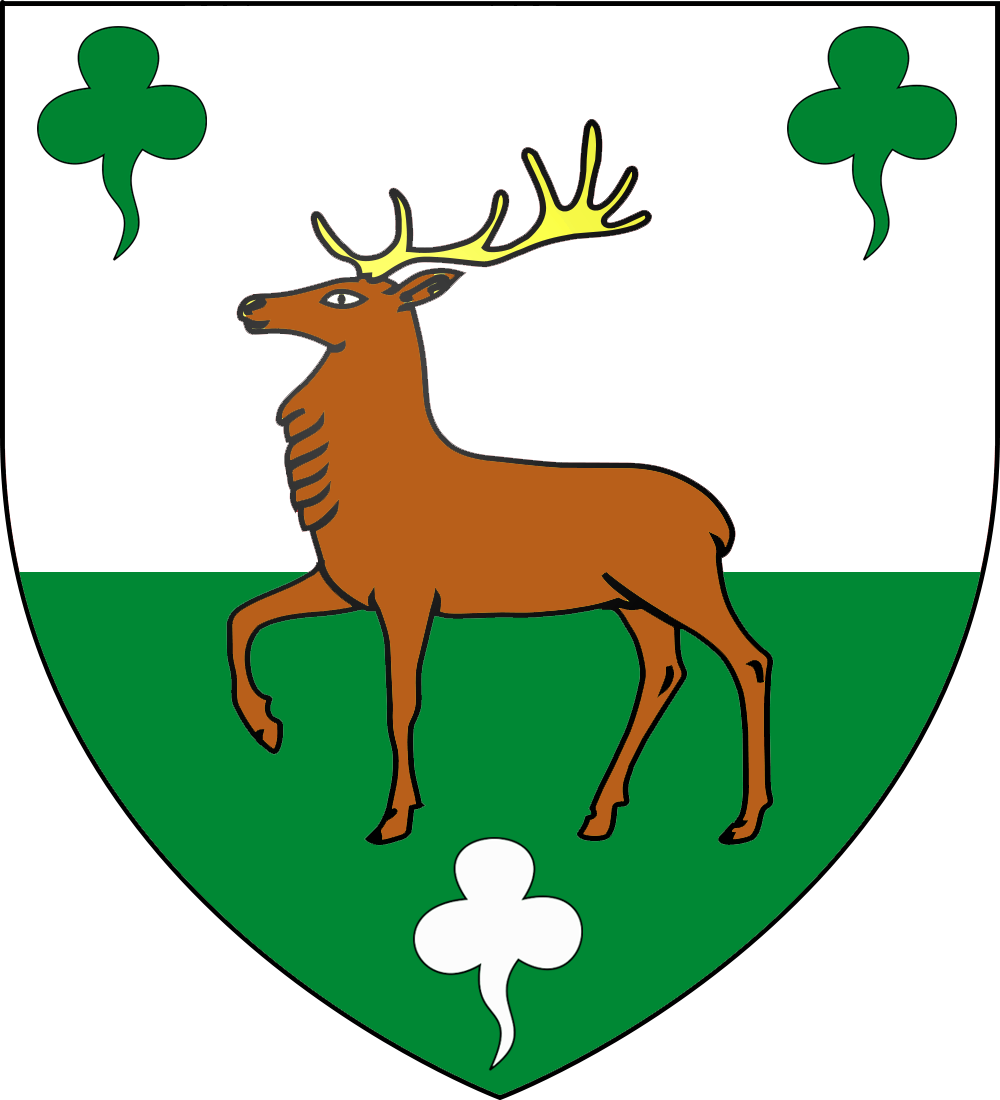
O'Connell.

The O'Connell family, principally of Derrynane, are a Gaelic Irish Noble family of County Kerry in Munster. The principal seat of the senior line of the family was Derrynane Abbey, now an Irish National Monument.

== Ancestry and extraction ==
According to tradition, the O'Connell family descends from the ancient Uí Fidgenti (Uí Chonaill Gabra sept) of County Limerick, being descendants of Dáire Cerbba, and are thus cousins of the O'Donovans and O'Collins. Other ancestors, through marriage, include the Kings of Thomond of the great O'Brien dynasty, the MacCarthy Mor dynasty of the great Kingdom of Desmond, the two O'Sullivan dynasties Beare and Mor, O'Callaghan, O'Connor Kerry, O'Donovan of Clancahill, and the O'Donoghue Dhuv sept of O'Donoghue of the Glens.

== Origins ==
It has been suggested that the O'Connells are a sept of the Corcu Duibne, the Ua Congaile, a kingdom native to County Kerry. This is supported by historian C. Thomas Cairney who said that the O'Connells were from the Corcu Duibne tribe, who in turn were from the Erainn tribe, the second wave of Celts to settle in Ireland from about 500 to 100 BC. While this is a possibility, there remains more supporting evidence for a descent from the Uí Chonaill Gabra of County Limerick: a family using the sept name of their former kingdom as their surname following its disintegration is not something unheard of in Ireland, and the claims of Count O'Connell to descent from Dáire Cerbba cannot simply be dismissed as career-minded, when the Uí Fidgenti had long since faded and a Corcu Duibne ancestry would have been no less attractive. A descent from the Corcu Duibne would make the O'Connells of Derrynane kin to the O'Sheas and O'Falveys, and descendants of the legendary Conaire Mór, ancestor also of the Dál Riata monarchs of Scotland.

Thus the O'Connells are not technically allowed to be of royal extraction because they cannot conclusively prove their patrilineal ancestors to have been kings of any specific septs or territories, even if they might have been. But through marriage they are closely related to the various ancient royal families of Munster, and in fact to a greater extent than those are to each other. The province of Munster was itself divided into several exclusive provinces but the O'Connells were successful in bridging this.

== Notable family members ==
- John Ó Connell (d. 1740)
- James Ó Connell
  - Maurice O'Connell, of Tarmons (1703–1770)
    - Baron Moritz O'Connell (1738–1830)
    - Daniel O'Connell "of the Stallions"
    - Geoffrey O'Connell (1728–1820)
- Daniel O'Connell (1701–1770)
  - Patrick O’Connell (1703-1794) “The Forefather”
      - Morgan O'Connell (1739–1809)
        - Daniel O'Connell (1775–1847) "The Liberator"
        - Maurice O'Connell (1801–1853)
        - Morgan O'Connell (1804–1885)
        - Ellen Fitzsimon (1805-1883)
        - John O'Connell (MP) (1810–1858)
        - Daniel O'Connell Jnr (1816–1897)
      - John O'Connell (1778–1853)
        - Morgan John O'Connell (1811–1875)
      - Sir James O'Connell, 1st Baronet (1786–1872)
        - later O'Connell Baronets
    - Eibhlín Dubh Ní Chonaill (1743–1800)
    - Daniel Charles O'Connell (1745–1833)

Cousins of the O'Connells of Derrynane were Sir Maurice Charles O'Connell and son Maurice Charles O'Connell (Australian politician). Another cousin was Daniel O'Connell (journalist).

== See also ==
- Irish clans
- Irish nobility
- O'Connell Street
