= John O'Connell =

John O'Connell may refer to:

== Politicians ==
- John A. O'Connell (1939–2000), American politician, member of the California legislature
- John Matthew O'Connell (1872–1941), American politician, Congressman from Rhode Island
- John O'Connell (Dublin politician) (1927–2013), Irish Labour Party and Fianna Fáil politician
- John O'Connell (mayor) (1826–1909), American political figure, mayor of Marlborough, Massachusetts
- John O'Connell (MP) (1810–1858), Irish politician, son of nationalist leader Daniel O'Connell
- John J. O'Connell (politician) (1919–1998), American attorney and politician from Washington
- John A. O'Connell (San Francisco politician) (1873–1948), Secretary of the San Francisco Labor Council

== Sportspeople ==
- John O'Connell (catcher) (1904–1992), former baseball player, 1928–1929
- John O'Connell (footballer, born 1951) (1951–1989), Australian rules footballer for Carlton
- John O'Connell (footballer, born 1932) (1932–2026), Australian rules footballer for Claremont and Geelong
- John O'Connell (second baseman) (1872–1908), former baseball player, 1891–1902
- John O'Connell (soccer) (died 1988), American soccer player
- John O'Connell (Gaelic footballer), Gaelic footballer from County Laois
- John O'Connell (sprinter), winner of the 60 yards at the 1952 USA Indoor Track and Field Championships
- Johnny O'Connell (born 1962), American race car driver

== Others ==
- John J. O'Connell (police officer) (1884–1946), New York policeman
- John Joseph O'Connell (1894–1949), American federal judge
- John Robert O'Connell (1868–1943), Irish lawyer and businessman
- John O'Connell (director) (born 1959), American television soap opera director
- John O'Connell Bridge, a bridge crossing Sitka Channel in Sitka, Alaska, named for John W. O'Connell

== See also ==
- Jack O'Connell (disambiguation)
- John Connell (disambiguation)
