= Charles Connell (disambiguation) =

Charles Connell was a Canadian politician.

Charles Connell may also refer to:

- Charles Gibson Connell (1899–1986), Scottish advocate and ornithologist
- Charles R. Connell (1864–1922), Republican member of the U.S. House of Representatives
- Charles Connell and Company, Scottish shipbuilding company
- Charles Connell House, historic former home of the Canadian politician
- Charlie Connell, see Ottawa Rough Riders all-time records and statistics

== See also ==
- Charles O'Connell (disambiguation)
