= O'Connell baronets =

Baronetcy in the Baronetage of the United Kingdom

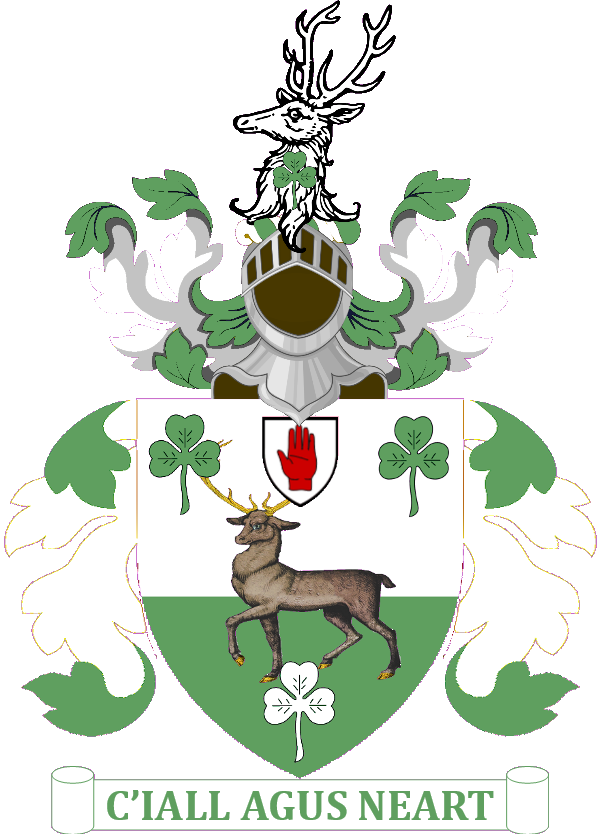
- Crest: A stag's head erased Argent charged with a trefoil slipped Vert.
- Shield: Per fess Argent and Vert a stag trippant Proper between three trefoils slipped counterchanged.
- Motto: C'iall Agus Neart (Reason and Strength)

The O'Connell Baronetcy, of Lakeview in Killarney in the County of Kerry and of Ballybeggan in Tralee in the County of Kerry, is a title in the Baronetage of the United Kingdom. It was created on 29 October 1869 for James O'Connell. He was the youngest brother of the famous Irish politician Daniel O'Connell and the nephew of the soldier Lieutenant-General Daniel Charles, Count O'Connell.

== O'Connell baronets, of Lakeview and Ballybeggan (1869) ==
- Sir James O'Connell, 1st Baronet (1786–1872)
- Sir Maurice James O'Connell, 2nd Baronet (1821–1896)
- Sir Daniel Ross O'Connell, 3rd Baronet (1861–1905)
- Sir Morgan Ross O'Connell, 4th Baronet (1862–1919)
- Sir Maurice James Arthur O'Connell, 5th Baronet (1889–1949)
- Sir Morgan Donal Conail O'Connell, 6th Baronet (1923–1989)
- Sir Maurice James Donagh MacCarthy O'Connell, 7th Baronet (born 1958) – continues to own Lakeview House, (Fossa, Killarney).

The heir apparent to the baronetcy is the 7th Baronet's son, Morgan O'Connell (born 2003).

== See also ==
- O'Connell of Derrynane
