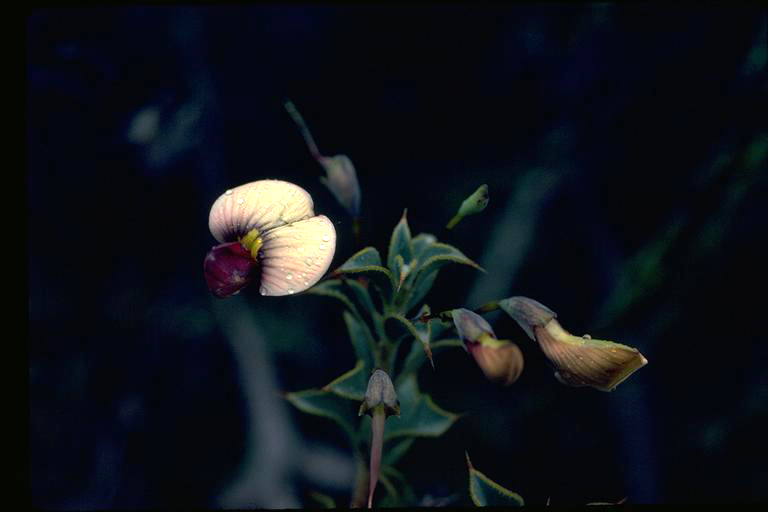
- Near Nyabing

Scientific classification
- Kingdom: Plantae
- Clade: Tracheophytes
- Clade: Angiosperms
- Clade: Eudicots
- Clade: Rosids
- Order: Fabales
- Family: Fabaceae
- Subfamily: Faboideae
- Genus: Daviesia
- Species: D. uniflora

Binomial name
- Daviesia uniflora Crisp

= Daviesia uniflora =

Species of legume

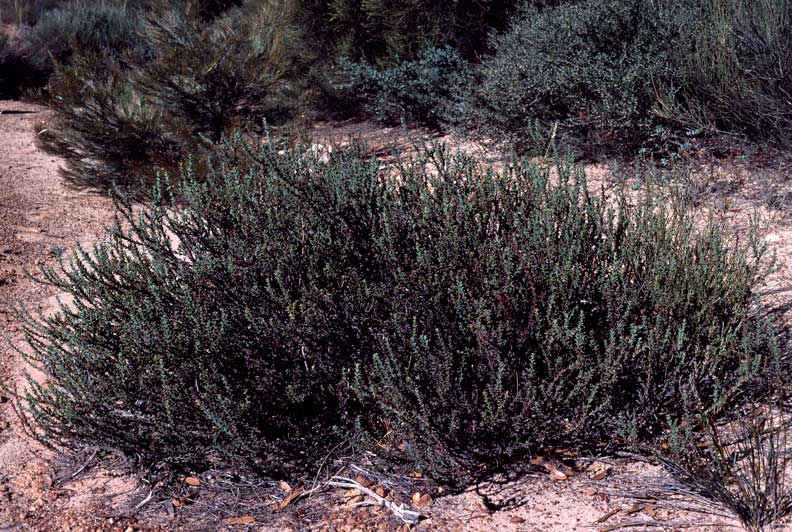
Habit near Narembeen

Daviesia uniflora is a species of flowering plant in the family Fabaceae and is endemic to the south-west of Western Australia. It is a spreading or low-lying shrub with hairy branchlets, crowded egg-shaped, sharply-pointed phyllodes with the narrower end towards the base and pale yellow and purple flowers.

== Description ==
Daviesia uniflora is a spreading or low-lying shrub that typically grows up to 70 cm (28 in) high and 4 m (13 ft) wide bristly-hairy branchlets. Its phyllodes are crowded and overlapping, egg-shaped with the narrower end towards the base, 7–13 mm (0.28–0.51 in) long, 3–8 mm (0.12–0.31 in) wide and sharply pointed. The flowers are arranged singly in leaf axils on a peduncle 8–12 mm (0.31–0.47 in) long, the pedicel 4–8 mm (0.16–0.31 in) long with narrowly oblong to linear bracts at the base. The sepals are 5–6 mm (0.20–0.24 in) long and joined at the base, the upper two lobes joined for most of their length and the lower three triangular. The standard petal is broadly egg-shaped, 10–15 mm (0.39–0.59 in) long, 10–14 mm (0.39–0.55 in) wide and pale yellow with purplish markings and a rich yellow centre. The wings are 9–12 mm (0.35–0.47 in) long and purple, the keel 13–15 mm (0.51–0.59 in) long and purple. Flowering occurs from July to November and the fruit is a triangular pod 10–15 mm (0.39–0.59 in) long.

== Taxonomy ==
Daviesia uniflora was first formally described in 1922 by Desmond Herbert in the Journal and Proceedings of the Royal Society of Western Australia from specimens he collected with Herbert Ward Wilson near Yoting in 1922. The specific epithet (uniflora) means "one-flowered".

== Distribution and habitat ==
This daviesia mainly grows in kwongan in the area between Kojonup, Ravensthorpe and the Great Eastern Highway in the Avon Wheatbelt and Mallee bioregions of south-western Western Australia.

== Conservation status ==
Daviesia uniflora is classified as "not threatened" by the Government of Western Australia Department of Biodiversity, Conservation and Attractions.
