= Jimmy O'Connell =

Jimmy O'Connell may refer to:

- Jimmy O'Connell (baseball) (1901–1976), outfielder in Major League Baseball
- Jimmy O'Connell (hurler) (1908–?), Irish hurler

== See also ==
- James Connell (disambiguation)
- James O'Connell (disambiguation)
