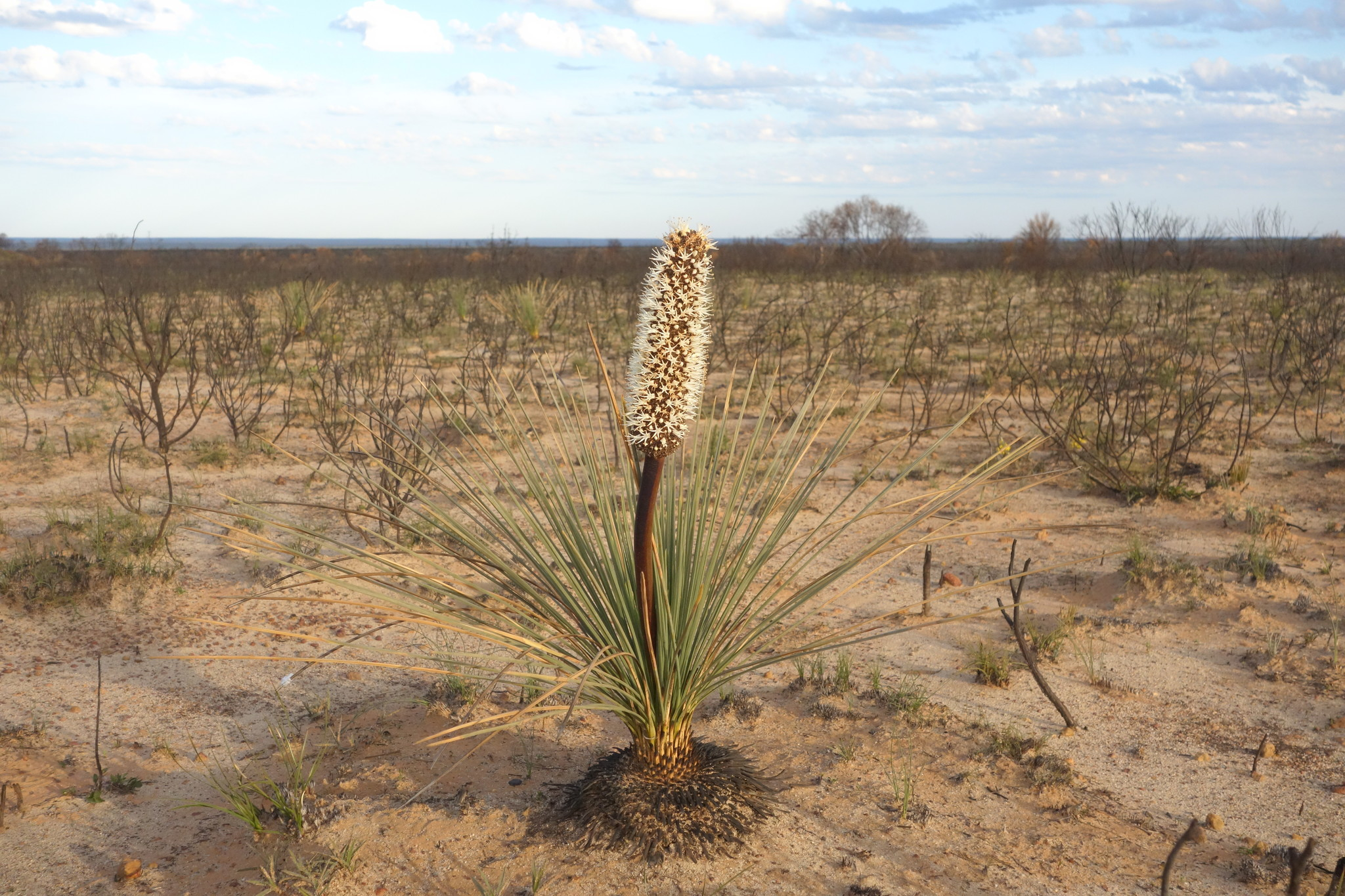

Scientific classification
- Kingdom: Plantae
- Clade: Tracheophytes
- Clade: Angiosperms
- Clade: Monocots
- Order: Asparagales
- Family: Asphodelaceae
- Subfamily: Xanthorrhoeoideae
- Genus: Xanthorrhoea
- Species: X. nana

Binomial name
- Xanthorrhoea nana D.A.Herb.

= Xanthorrhoea nana =

Species of flowering plant

Xanthorrhoea nana, commonly known as dwarf grasstree, is a species of grasstree of the genus Xanthorrhoea native to Western Australia.

== Description ==
The perennial grass tree typically grows to a height of 1 metre (3 ft) with the trunk reaching 0 to 0.5 metres (0 to 2 ft), scape of 0.3 metres (1.0 ft) and the flower spike to 0.3 metres (1 ft). It blooms between August and October producing cream-white flowers.

== Distribution ==
It has a scattered distribution the Wheatbelt and western Goldfields-Esperance regions of Western Australia where grows in sandy soils.
