= David Connell =

David Connell may refer to:

- David Connell (cinematographer) (born 1955), Australian cinematographer
- David Connell (football), former manager of East Stirlingshire F.C.
- David Connell (television producer) (1931–1995), American television producer
- David Connell (musician), bass guitarist and member of The Connells, American band
- David H. Connell (musician), organist and choral conductor; director of the Yale Glee Club 1991–2001
- David Connell (actor) (1935–2013), American actor
- W. David Connell (born 1954), amateur astronomer after whom the asteroid 25957 Davidconnell is named

== See also ==
- David O'Connell (disambiguation)
