= Xanthorrhoea brevistyla =

Conservation status
- Priority Four — Rare Taxa (DEC)

Scientific classification
- Kingdom: Plantae
- Clade: Tracheophytes
- Clade: Angiosperms
- Clade: Monocots
- Order: Asparagales
- Family: Asphodelaceae
- Subfamily: Xanthorrhoeoideae
- Genus: Xanthorrhoea
- Species: X. brevistyla

Binomial name
- Xanthorrhoea brevistyla D.A.Herb.

Species of flowering plant

Xanthorrhoea brevistyla is a species of grasstree of the genus Xanthorrhoea native to Western Australia.

== Description ==
The perennial grass tree typically grows to a height of 3.5 metres (11 ft) usually with no trunk but with a scape of 0.8 to 1.25 metres (2.6 to 4.1 ft) and the flower spike to 0.25 to 1.0 metre (1 to 3 ft). It blooms between October and December producing white flowers.

== Classification ==
The species was first formally described by Desmond Herbert in 1921 as part of the work The genus Xanthorrhoea in Western Australia as published in Journal and Proceedings of the Royal Society of Western Australia.

== Distribution ==
It has a limited distribution in the Wheatbelt and Great Southern regions of Western Australia. It extends from Narrogin in the north to Cranbrook in the south where it grows in sandy-clay soils over laterite.
