= Conal (given name) =

Conal is an Irish male given name (and rarely a surname). Notable people with the name include:

- Saint Conal, Irish bishop who flourished in the fifth century
- Conal Bonnar (born 1969), former Irish sportsperson
- Conal Coad, opera singer
- Conal Gallen, Irish comedian and singer
- Conal Gregory (born 1947), UK Conservative Party MP for York 1983–1992
- Conal Groom (born 1973), head coach at Seattle Rowing Center, Seattle, Washington
- Conal Holmes O'Connell O'Riordan (1874–1948), Irish dramatist and novelist
- Conal Keaney, Irish footballer and hurler
- Conal O'Brien (born 1956), American television soap opera director
- Conal Platt (born 1986), professional footballer

== As surname ==
- Robbie Conal (born 1944), American guerilla poster artist noted

== See also ==
- St Conal's Hospital, psychiatric hospital in Letterkenny, County Donegal, Ireland
- Conall (disambiguation)
