= John Connell =

John Connell may refer to:

- John Connell (artist) (1940–2009), American artist
- John Connell (actor) (1923–2015), American actor
- John Henry Connell (1860–1952), Australian hotelier and patron of the arts
- John Connell (geographer) (born 1946), Australian-British geographer
- Sir John Connell (c.1765–1831), Scottish judge

== See also ==
- John Connill, 16th-century Irish soldier
