= Desmond Herbert =

Australian botanist (1898–1976)

Desmond Andrew Herbert CMG (17 June 1898 – 8 September 1976) was an Australian botanist.

The son of a fruit-grower, Herbert was born in Diamond Creek, Victoria in 1898; was educated at Malvern State School and the Melbourne Church of England Grammar School, then matriculated to the University of Melbourne, from which he obtained a BSc in Biology in 1918 and a MSc in Botany in 1920. He was a nephew of Melbourne art collector and philanthropist John Henry Connell, who helped fund his education.

He began his botanic career in 1919 as a botanical assistant in the Explosives Section of Western Australia's Mines Department. He was later appointed Economic Botanist and Plant Pathologist for Western Australia, and also lectured part-time in agricultural botany and plant pathology at the University of Western Australia. During this time he made a number of collecting expeditions in south-west Western Australia, and published a number of plant taxa, of which Daviesia uniflora, Xanthorrhoea brevistyla and Xanthorrhoea nana (dwarf grasstree) remain current. In 1921, he published a book, The Poison Plants of Western Australia.

In 1921, Herbert took up a position as Professor of Plant Physiology and Pathology at the University of the Philippines. On 11 December 1922 he married his assistant Vera McNeilance Prowse, daughter of John Henry Prowse; they had two sons and two daughters. Herbert returned to Australia in 1924, joining the Botany Department of the University of Queensland. Initially his position was that of lecturer, but in 1929 he obtained his D.Sc. from the University of Melbourne, and he was awarded an honorary D.Sc. by the University of Queensland in 1935. In 1946 he was promoted to associate professor; two years later he was appointed acting professor, and shortly afterwards foundation professor of botany. He was later made Dean of the Faculty of Science.

Herbert was President of the Queensland Naturalists' Club in 1926; of the Royal Society of Queensland in 1928; of the botany section of the Australian and New Zealand Association for the Advancement of Science in 1932; of the Horticultural Society of Queensland from 1936 to 1942; of the Orchid Society of Queensland in 1940; and of the Queensland branch of the Australian Institute of Agricultural Science in 1942. He lectured on horticulture for the Australian Broadcasting Commission, judged garden competitions, and wrote for the Sunday Mail. In 1952 he published a compilation of his Sunday Mail articles entitled Gardening in Warm Climates. During World War II he helped select sites for research into chemical warfare, and co-wrote a survival manual for the Royal Australian Air Force entitled Friendly Fruits and Vegetables.

Herbert retired in 1965, and a year later was appointed CMG. He died in Royal Brisbane Hospital on 8 September 1976, and his body was cremated.

One of his sons, John Desmond, was a Member of the Legislative Assembly of Queensland, and a minister in Frank Nicklin's Country Party government. A daughter born in 1930, Joan Winifred (Cribb), herself became a botanist of some renown.

Eucalyptus herbertiana was named in his honour.

Herbert was red-green colour blind.
