= Charles O'Connell =

Charles O'Connell may refer to:

- Charlie O'Connelll (born 1975), American actor and reality television personality.
- Charles O'Connell (Irish politician) (1805–1877)
- Charles Underwood O'Connell (1838–1902), Fenian activist
- Charles K. O'Connell, Kentucky secretary of state, see Political party strength in Kentucky
- Charles O'Connell (music producer)

== See also ==
- Charlie O'Connell (disambiguation)
- Charles Connell (disambiguation)
