= Patrick O'Connell =

Patrick O'Connell may refer to:

- Patrick O'Connell (American football) (born 1998), American football player
- Patrick O'Connell (actor) (1934–2017), Irish film and television actor
- Patrick O'Connell (chef) (born 1945), author, chef, and owner of the Inn at Little Washington
- Patrick O'Connell (footballer) (1887–1959), Irish footballer and manager
- Patrick O'Connell (poet) (1944–2005), Canadian poet
- Paddy O'Connell (born 1966), BBC TV presenter
- Paddy O'Connell (Gaelic footballer) (1888–1980), Irish Gaelic footballer
- Pat O'Connell (surfer) (born 1971), American surfer
- Pat O'Connell (baseball) (1861–1943), Major League Baseball center fielder
- Pat O'Connell (footballer) (born 1937), English footballer
- Patrick O'Connell, husband of actress Maggie Baird and father of musicians Billie Eilish and Finneas O'Connell
