= James Connell (lawyer) =

American Human Rights Attorney

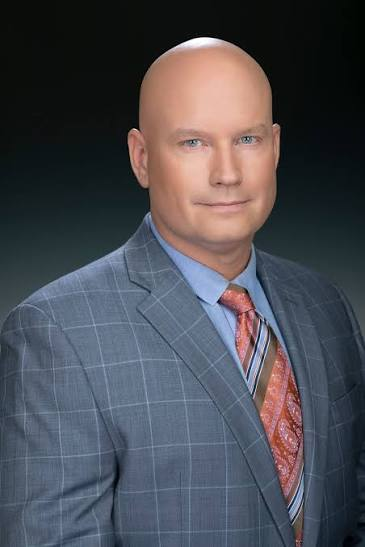
- Education: Berklee College of Music; William & Mary Law School
- Occupation: lawyer
- Website: https://www.connell.law

James Connell is an American human rights attorney best known for his work in death penalty cases. He was one of the federal habeas attorneys for John Allen Mohammad, who was executed in 2009 for the D.C. sniper attacks. Connell is currently lead counsel for Ammar al-Baluchi in the United States Military Commissions at Naval Station Guantanamo Bay and represents Muhammad Rahim al Afghani, also detained at Guantanamo.

== Early life and education ==
Connell grew up in Valdosta, Georgia, and attended Valdosta High School. He attended college at Florida State University and graduated law school in 1996 at William & Mary Law School. In addition Connell has a Master's in Music Business from Berklee College of Music, and will continue to use it to protect artists in the music industry.

== Career ==
After working in state and federal defender offices, Connell practiced law in Fairfax, Virginia. With several partners, Connell primarily handled cases in which Virginia or other jurisdictions sought the death penalty.

In the late 2000s, Connell handled the federal habeas corpus case of John Allen Mohammad. Connell represented Mohammad until his execution in 2009.

In 2011, Connell left his Virginia law firm to work for the United States Department of Defense, Military Commissions Defense Organization. In 2013, he left federal employment to form his own law firm, Connell Law. In August 2013, Connell was the first attorney to visit a client at the secretive Camp 7 prison.

Connell provided some legal services in the first 9/11 military commission in 2008. He began representing Al Baluchi full time in 2011 after the Obama Administrative revived the military commissions. In the military commissions, Connell showed clips of the film Zero Dark Thirty as part of an effort to obtain information of the use of Ammar al Baluchi as the foundation for the character “Ammar” in the film. Connell has made extensive use of the Freedom of Information Act to obtain records and compare with the information provided by the military commission prosecution. Connell spearheaded the effort to exclude Federal Bureau of Investigation interrogations of al Baluchi and others by linking them to Central Intelligence Agency interrogation under torture on the same topics.

In 2015, Connell led the presentation on the Human Rights Situation of Persons Deprived of Liberty at the Guantánamo Naval Base to the Inter-American Commission on Human Rights.

Connell was a legal consultant for the Sundance TV drama Rectify.

In 2025, Connell was recognized in a lawsuit forcing the CIA to confirm or deny any records regarding any operational control over Camp VII at GTMO. ultimately the court ruled in favor of the CIA claiming the agency never officially waived its right to issue a Glomar (neither confirms nor denies) response.

=== Berklee College of Music ===
Connell, uses his masters from Berklee College of music to help artists with the following: Agency and management with publishing contracts, band agreements, copyright/trademark, licensing agreements, clearing samples, and fair use.

During his time at Berklee, Connell completed his Master's thesis about copyright and the use of AI in modern music, and will continue to his legal knowledge to support artists in the future.

== External Link ==
Official website
