= Joe O'Connell =

Joe or Joseph O'Connell may refer to:

- Joe M. O'Connell (fl. 1980s–2020s), American novelist
- Joe O'Connell (Irish republican) (born 1951), Irish republican and member of the Balcombe Street gang
- Joe O'Connell, indie recording artist of Elephant Micah
- Joseph E. O'Connell (died 1960), American businessman and racehorse owner
- Joseph F. O'Connell (1872–1942), U.S. representative
- Joseph J. O'Connell (1905–1983), American lawyer and government official
- Joseph John O'Connell (1861–1959), engineer and inventor
- Joseph O'Connell (bishop) (1931–2013), Australian bishop
