= Charlie O'Connell (disambiguation) =

Charlie O'Connell (born 1975) is an American actor and reality television personality.

Charlie O'Connell may also refer to:

- Charlie O'Connell (footballer) (born 2002), English footballer
- Charlie O'Connell (roller derby) (1935–2015), American roller derby skater
- Charlie O'Connell (rugby union), New Zealand player in Otago Rugby Football Union

== See also ==
- Charles O'Connell (disambiguation)
