= Conall =

Conall may refer to the following:

== Persons ==
- Conall mac Taidg, Scottish king
- Conall Cremthainne, Irish king
- Conall Grant (died 718), a king of Brega, north of Dublin, Ireland
- Conall Gulban, Irish king
- Conall Crandomna, Scottish king
- Conall Guthbinn, Irish king
- Conall mac Comgaill, Scottish king
- Conall mac Áedáin, Scottish King
- Conall O Ceidigh, Irish Actor

== Mythology ==
- Conall Cernach, Irish mythic warrior
- Conall Collamrach, legendary Irish king

== Other ==
- Conall Cra Bhuidhe, Scottish fairy tales
- Storm Conall, in the Netherlands and the United Kingdom, November 2024

== See also ==
- Conal (given name)
