= Sir James O'Connell, 1st Baronet =

Sir James O'Connell Bt
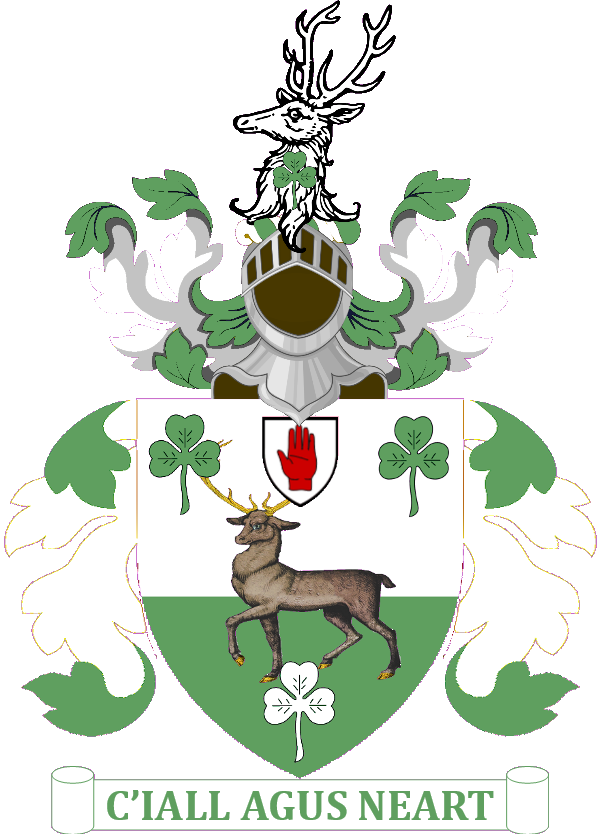
- Born: 10 January 1786
- Died: 28 July 1872 (aged 86)
- Spouse: Jane O'Donoghue
- Children: 5

Sir James O'Connell, 1st Baronet (10 January 1786 – 28 July 1872) was an Irish baronet and younger brother of Daniel O'Connell.

== Life ==
James O’Connell established himself at Killarney (County Kerry, Ireland) in the early nineteenth century, leasing lands from the Herbert family of Muckross House. On 29 October 1869 he was created a "Baronet of Lakeview and of Ballybeggan".

In 1870 Sir James O’Connell built "Lakeview House", replacing an earlier house called "Lakeville". It was built in 1740 and located in the southern end of the townland of "Maulagh". Lakeview House still exists and is in the possession of descendants of Sir James O'Connell.

His estate amounted to over 18,000 acres in the 1870s and included lands in the parish of Ratass in the barony of Trughanacmy (County Kerry).

== Family ==
Sir James was the son of Morgan O'Connell, a general store proprietor, and Catherine O'Mullane - both parents being from a Roman Catholic family. O'Connell was the younger brother of Daniel O'Connell and the nephew of the soldier Lieutenant-General Daniel Charles, Count O'Connell. He was married to Jane O'Donoghue and had five children, the eldest son succeeding as Sir Maurice James O'Connell, 2nd Baronet (1821–1896).

Coat of arms of Sir James O'Connell, 1st Baronet

Crest
A stag's head erased Argent charged with a trefoil slipped Vert.
Escutcheon
Per fess Argent and Vert a stag trippant Proper between three trefoils slipped counterchanged.
Motto
C'iall Agus Neart (Reason and Strength)

== See also ==
- O'Connell baronets

Baronetage of the United Kingdom
New creation	Baronet (of Lakeview and Ballybeggan); 1869–1872	Succeeded by Maurice James O'Connell
