= David O'Connell =

David O'Connell may refer to:

- Dáithí Ó Conaill (1938–1991), Irish republican
- David O'Connell (politician) (born 1940), American politician
- David G. O'Connell (1953–2023), Irish-born American auxiliary bishop Roman Catholic Archdiocese of Los Angeles, 2015–2023
- David J. O'Connell (politician) (1868–1930), U.S. Representative from New York
- David J. O'Connell (producer) (1916–1996), American editor, producer and production manager
- David M. O'Connell (born 1955), American bishop of the Roman Catholic Diocese of Trenton
- David O'Connell (footballer) (born 1963), Australian rules footballer

== See also ==
- David Connell (disambiguation)
