= Jack O'Connell =

Jack O'Connell may refer to:

- Jack O'Connell (actor) (born 1990), English actor
- Jack O'Connell (Australian politician) (1903–1972), member of the Victorian Legislative Council
- Jack O'Connell (diplomat) (1921–2010), American diplomat and CIA Station chief in Amman, Jordan, 1963–1971
- Jack O'Connell (filmmaker) (1923–2019), American director of the 1968 film Revolution
- Jack O'Connell (English footballer) (born 1994), English footballer
- Jack O'Connell (Australian footballer) (1902–1975), Australian rules footballer
- Jack O'Connell (American politician) (born 1951), American politician
- Jack O'Connell (rugby union) (born 1990), Irish rugby union player
- Jack O'Connell (author) (1959–2024), American novelist

== See also ==
- John O'Connell (disambiguation)
