= Martin O'Connell =

Martin O'Connell may refer to:

- Martin O'Connell (Gaelic footballer) (born 1963), Irish Gaelic footballer
- Martin O'Connell (politician) (1916–2003), Canadian politician
- Martin O'Connell (racing driver), British Formula Three National Class champion 1997 and 1999
- Joe O'Connell (Irish republican) (Martin Joseph O'Connell, born 1951)
