= John Henry Connell =

Australian hotelier and patron of the arts

John Henry Connell (24 May, 1860–9 December, 1952) was an Australian hotelier and patron of the arts.

Connell was born in East Collingwood, Melbourne, son of William Henry Connell of Dublin, and Mary Connell (née Ingall) of London. As a young man, he worked at the Prince's Bridge Hotel, owned by Henry Figsby Young and Thomas Joshua Jackson (Jackson was married to Connell's aunt, Sarah, widow of Michael Cavanagh). The hotel was widely known as 'Young and Jackson's' and was famous for its collection of Victorian paintings and South Sea Island weapons lined the walls of the Prince's Bridge Hotel. In 1900, he took over the lease of the Railway Hotel in Elizabeth Street.

In 1888 he married Emily Baker (1866–1913), who has been given credit for cultivating his taste in art. In September 1913, after Emily's death, he married Ellen (‘Nellie’) Harris (1870–1950), the widow of his cousin, James Cavanagh.

He was a major benefactor to the National Gallery of Victoria, donating a major collection of furniture, decorative arts, and pictures in 1914, described as having 'helped educate and form the taste of a whole generation of Melburnians'. Connell Place in the Canberra suburb of Conder is named in his honour.

His sister Winifred Herbert was the mother of the botanist Desmond Herbert.
