= Maurice O'Connell =

Maurice O'Connell may refer to:

- Maurice O'Connell (MP) (c. 1801–1853), Irish politician, member of parliament (MP) for Tralee 1832–1837 and 1838–1853, son of Daniel O'Connell
- Maurice O'Connell (Fine Gael politician) (born 1936), Irish Fine Gael senator
- Maurice O'Connell (banker) (died 2019), governor of the Central Bank of Ireland
- Maurice Charles O'Connell (Australian politician) (1812–1879)
- Maurice Charles O'Connell (1768–1848), commander of forces and lieutenant-governor of New South Wales
- Maurice D. O'Connell (1839–1922), Iowa attorney
- Maurice O'Connell (landowner) (1728–1825), Irish landowner and smuggler
- Maurice O'Connell (actor) (born 1941) in The Satanic Rites of Dracula
