= Sarah O'Connell =

Sarah O'Connell (1822?–1870) was a New Zealand runholder. She was born in Mallow, County Cork, Ireland in 1822.
