= Daniel Charles O'Connell =

Count Daniel O'Connell Dónal Ó Conaill
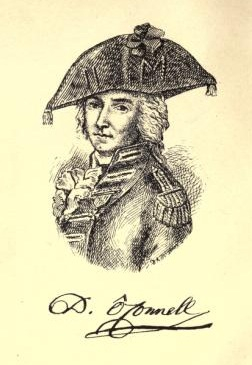
- Born: 21 May 1745; Derrynane, County Kerry, Ireland
- Died: 9 July 1833 (aged 88); Château de Mâdon, Blois, France
- Occupation: Soldier

Daniel Charles, Count O'Connell (21 May 1745 – 9 July 1833) was the uncle of Daniel O'Connell "the Liberator." He was from a noble family of Derrynane House, County Kerry, Ireland, but because of the Penal Laws (Ireland) of the time, which forbade a Catholic to have any education or profession, he, like many other ambitious young Irishmen, went to the Continent for an education, and remained abroad. He entered the service of the king of France in the Royal Swedish Regiment (Royal Suédois) in 1761, and in 1769 was transferred to Lord Clare's Regiment of the Irish Brigade (French) and served in Europe and Mauritius until 1778. Then he was appointed Lieutenant-Colonel and transferred back to the Royal Swedish Regiment, with which he saw action at the siege of Port Mahón and at the Great Siege of Gibraltar. "At Gibraltar he was on board one of the famous floating batteries and was severely wounded." He was later appointed Colonel Commander of the Régiment de Salm-Salm, and was created a Chevalier of the Order of Saint Louis. He also was appointed to a military committee charged with revising French infantry tactics.

Daniel Charles O'Connell was created Count O'Connell by Louis XVI in 1785.

He became an officer in the French king's Irish Brigade. He was a friend of, among others, Benoît de Boigne.

O'Connell left France for England after the French Revolution. The laws against Catholics were weakening, and in 1794, at the instigation of British Prime Minister William Pitt the Younger, he now joined the British Army and raised the fourth regiment of the Irish Brigade of the British Army, which he commanded until the corps was disbanded.

After visiting France in 1802, he was seized by Napoleon, and remained his prisoner until 1814.

He died at Blois, France, at the chateau of his stepdaughter, in July 1833, holding the ranks of General in the French and Colonel in the British army.

== See also ==
- O'Connell of Derrynane
- Irish nobility
- Uí Fidgenti
