= List of townlands of County Galway =

This is a sortable table of the approximately 4,556 townlands in County Galway, Ireland.

It does not show townlands in the Civil Parish of Inishbofin that were transferred to Galway from Mayo in 1873 or a few townlands transferred into Galway in 1899 to complete the Ballinsloe Town boundary.

It does show townlands transferred to Roscommon, Mayo and Clare in 1899.

Duplicate names occur where there is more than one townland with the same name in the county. Names marked in bold typeface are Towns (not Townlands) and villages, and the word Town appears for those entries in the Acres column.

== Townland list ==
Townland	Acres	Barony	Civil parish	Poor law union
Abberanville	24	Athenry	Kiltullagh	Loughrea
Abbert	178	Tiaquin	Monivea	Tuam
Abbert Demesne	1293	Tiaquin	Monivea	Tuam
Abbey	875	Tiaquin	Abbeyknockmoy	Tuam
Abbey	334	Leitrim	Ballynakill	Portumna
Abbeyfield	18	Kilconnell	Kilconnell	Ballinasloe
Abbeygormacan	94	Longford	Abbeygormacan	Ballinasloe
Abbeygrey (or Monasternalea)	503	Killian	Athleague	Mountbellew
Abbeygrey (or Monasternalea)	157	Killian	Killeroran	Mountbellew
Abbeyland Great	812	Longford	Clonfert	Ballinasloe
Abbeyland Little	231	Longford	Clonfert	Ballinasloe
Abbeyland North	26	Dunmore	Dunmore	Tuam
Abbeyland South	22	Dunmore	Dunmore	Tuam
Abbeypark	283	Clonmacnowen	Clontuskert	Ballinasloe
Abbeytown	263	Clare	Donaghpatrick	Tuam
Abbeyville	95	Leitrim	Ballynakill	Portumna
Acre Beg	44	Loughrea	Kilteskill	Loughrea
Acre East	154	Killian	Ahascragh	Mountbellew
Acre More	85	Loughrea	Kilteskill	Loughrea
Acre West	11	Killian	Ahascragh	Mountbellew
Acres	191	Tiaquin	Kilkerrin	Glennamaddy
Acres	23	Leitrim	Ballynakill	Loughrea
Acres	8	Dunmore	Tuam	Tuam
Acres	4	Galway	Rahoon	Galway
Addergoole	2658	Ballynahinch	Ballynakill	Clifden
Addergoole	606	Longford	Abbeygormacan	Ballinasloe
Addergoole	493	Clare	Annaghdown	Galway
Addergoole	151	Clare	Killererin	Tuam
Addergoole Beg	161	Dunmore	Dunmore	Tuam
Addergoole More	278	Dunmore	Dunmore	Tuam
Addergoole North	1068	Killian	Ahascragh	Ballinasloe
Addergoole South	54	Clonmacnowen	Ahascragh	Ballinasloe
Addergoole West	53	Clonmacnowen	Ahascragh	Ballinasloe
Addragool	149	Moycullen	Moycullen	Galway
Aggard Beg	313	Dunkellin	Killora	Loughrea
Aggard More	333	Dunkellin	Killora	Loughrea
Aghafadda	128	Tiaquin	Monivea	Loughrea
Aghalateeve	434	Ballymoe	Kilbegnet	Glennamaddy
Aghanahil	223	Tiaquin	Killoscobe	Mountbellew
Aghany	59	Longford	Killimorbologue	Portumna
Aghlisk	186	Dunmore	Tuam	Tuam
Aghrane (or Castlekelly)	751	Killian	Athleague	Mountbellew
Aghrane (or Castlekelly)	564	Killian	Killeroran	Mountbellew
Agrimhill	88	Longford	Lickmolassy	Portumna
Ahaglugger	19	Galway	Rahoon	Galway
Ahanduff Beg	68	Longford	Killimorbologue	Portumna
Ahanduff More	176	Longford	Killimorbologue	Portumna
Ahapouleen	187	Dunkellin	Ballynacourty	Galway
**Ahascragh**	Town	Kilconnell	Ahascragh	Ballinasloe
Ahascragh East	123	Clonmacnowen	Ahascragh	Ballinasloe
Ahascragh West	376	Kilconnell	Ahascragh	Ballinasloe
Ahaun	181	Tiaquin	Kilkerrin	Glennamaddy
Ahgloragh	393	Dunmore	Tuam	Tuam
Aille	798	Moycullen	Killannin	Galway
Aille	534	Galway	Rahoon	Galway
Aille	379	Leitrim	Kilteskill	Loughrea
Aille	213	Dunmore	Dunmore	Tuam
Aille	29	Loughrea	Killeenadeema	Loughrea
Aillebrack	601	Ballynahinch	Ballindoon	Clifden
Aillenacally	339	Ballynahinch	Moyrus	Clifden
Aillenaveagh	964	Ballynahinch	Omey	Clifden
Airgloomy	205	Dunmore	Tuam	Tuam
Allaphreaghaun	228	Moycullen	Rahoon	Galway
Alleendarra East	890	Leitrim	Ballynakill	Loughrea
Alleendarra West	1684	Leitrim	Ballynakill	Loughrea
Alloon Lower	81	Tiaquin	Ballymacward	Ballinasloe
Alloon Upper	381	Tiaquin	Ballymacward	Ballinasloe
Alloonbaun	388	Tiaquin	Ballymacward	Ballinasloe
Allygola	226	Leitrim	Ballynakill	Loughrea
Allykeolaun	316	Leitrim	Ballynakill	Loughrea
**Anbally**	Town	Clare	Kilmoylan	Tuam
Anbally	495	Clare	Kilmoylan	Tuam
Angliham (or Gortacallow)	269	Galway	Oranmore	Galway
Annagh	800	Kilconnell	Ballymacward	Mountbellew
Annagh	619	Clare	Kilmoylan	Tuam
Annagh	271	Kiltartan	Kilbeacanty	Gort
Annagh East	221	Clare	Annaghdown	Galway
Annagh Hill	283	Clare	Kilmoylan	Tuam
Annagh West	169	Clare	Annaghdown	Galway
Annaghbeg	720	Clonmacnowen	Ahascragh	Ballinasloe
Annaghbeg	305	Tiaquin	Kilkerrin	Glennamaddy
Annaghbeg	55	Moycullen	Kilcummin	Oughterard
Annaghbride	345	Leitrim	Kilmeen	Loughrea
Annaghcallow	282	Longford	Clonfert	Ballinasloe
Annaghcorrib	841	Longford	Clonfert	Ballinasloe
Annaghdown	686	Clare	Annaghdown	Galway
Annaghkeelaun	145	Moycullen	Kilcummin	Oughterard
Annaghkeen	633	Clare	Killursa	Tuam
Annaghminnoge	1	Moycullen	Kilcummin	Oughterard
Annaghmore East	1	Tiaquin	Moylough	Mountbellew
Annaghmore West	857	Tiaquin	Moylough	Mountbellew
Annaghvaan	311	Moycullen	Killannin	Oughterard
Annaghwood	22	Moycullen	Kilcummin	Oughterard
Apple Island	1	Kiltartan	Beagh	Gort
Ard	106	Moycullen	Kilcummin	Oughterard
Ard East	217	Ballynahinch	Moyrus	Clifden
Ard West	405	Ballynahinch	Moyrus	Clifden
Ardacong	200	Dunmore	Liskeevy	Tuam
Ardagh	1052	Ballynahinch	Ballindoon	Clifden
Ardagh	279	Ballymoe	Ballynakill	Glennamaddy
Ardamullivan	514	Kiltartan	Beagh	Gort
Ardaun	102	Dunkellin	Oranmore	Galway
Ardaun East	245	Ross	Cong	Oughterard
Ardaun West	210	Ross	Cong	Oughterard
Ardawarry	138	Clare	Killererin	Tuam
Ardbear	390	Ballynahinch	Moyrus	Clifden
Ardberreen	76	Longford	Killoran	Ballinasloe
Ardcloon	169	Dunmore	Addergoole	Tuam
Ardderroo	844	Moycullen	Killannin	Galway
Ardderrynagleragh	1410	Moycullen	Kilcummin	Oughterard
Ardeevin	95	Ballymoe	Boyounagh	Glennamaddy
Ardfintan	177	Clare	Killursa	Tuam
Ardfry	145	Dunkellin	Ballynacourty	Galway
Ardgaineen	616	Clare	Annaghdown	Tuam
Ardgraigue	284	Longford	Kilquain	Portumna
Ardillaun	8	Ballynahinch	Ballindoon	Clifden
Ardillaun	6	Ross	Cong	Oughterard
Ardkyle	209	Ballynahinch	Ballynakill	Clifden
Ardmore	497	Ballynahinch	Moyrus	Clifden
Ardmore	58	Ballynahinch	Omey	Clifden
Ardmore Island	1	Ballynahinch	Omey	Clifden
Ardnacross Island	2	Ballynahinch	Moyrus	Clifden
Ardnadoman East	71	Loughrea	Kilconickny	Loughrea
Ardnadoman West	181	Loughrea	Kilconickny	Loughrea
Ardnagall	259	Dunmore	Tuam	Tuam
Ardnageeha	211	Ross	Cong	Oughterard
Ardnagno	168	Kiltartan	Killinny	Gort
Ardnagreevagh	161	Ballynahinch	Ballynakill	Clifden
Ardnasillagh	244	Moycullen	Kilcummin	Oughterard
Ardnasodan	111	Clare	Kilmoylan	Tuam
Ardoslough	410	Ballymoe	Boyounagh	Glennamaddy
Ardour	551	Dunmore	Kilconla	Tuam
**Ardrahan**	Town	Dunkellin	Ardrahan	Gort
Ardrahan North	35	Dunkellin	Ardrahan	Gort
Ardrahan South	119	Dunkellin	Ardrahan	Gort
Ardranny Beg	302	Clonmacnowen	Clontuskert	Ballinasloe
Ardranny More	197	Clonmacnowen	Clontuskert	Ballinasloe
Ardros	148	Kilconnell	Killallaghtan	Ballinasloe
Ardrumkilla	674	Clare	Belclare	Tuam
Ardrumkilla	35	Clare	Killower	Tuam
Ardskea Beg	716	Clare	Kilmoylan	Tuam
Ardskea More	430	Clare	Kilmoylan	Tuam
Ardultagh	182	Longford	Kilquain	Portumna
Ardvarna	18	Moycullen	Kilcummin	Oughterard
Arkeen Beg	302	Ballynahinch	Moyrus	Clifden
Arkeen More	518	Ballynahinch	Moyrus	Clifden
Ash Island	1	Loughrea	Killeenadeema	Loughrea
Ashbrook	469	Kilconnell	Killaan	Ballinasloe
Ashfield	449	Ballymoe	Boyounagh	Glennamaddy
Ashfield	406	Tiaquin	Ballymacward	Mountbellew
Ashfield	40	Longford	Tiranascragh	Portumna
Ashfield Demesne	463	Kiltartan	Beagh	Gort
Ashford (or Cappacorcoge)	178	Ross	Cong	Oughterard
**Athenry**	Town	Athenry	Athenry	Loughrea
Athenry	65	Athenry	Athenry	Loughrea
Athry	1613	Ballynahinch	Moyrus	Clifden
Attibrassil	175	Clonmacnowen	Clontuskert	Ballinasloe
Atticlogh	392	Ballynahinch	Omey	Clifden
Atticoffey East	41	Clonmacnowen	Clontuskert	Ballinasloe
Atticoffey West	131	Clonmacnowen	Clontuskert	Ballinasloe
Attidavock	198	Tiaquin	Kilkerrin	Glennamaddy
Attidermot	197	Kilconnell	Aughrim	Ballinasloe
Attifarry	92	Killian	Athleague	Mountbellew
Attifineen	167	Kiltartan	Beagh	Gort
Attiflynn	118	Ballymoe	Dunmore	Glennamaddy
Attigara	116	Longford	Lickmolassy	Portumna
Attigoddaun	183	Ballynahinch	Omey	Clifden
Attikee	105	Longford	Kiltormer	Ballinasloe
Attimany	86	Tiaquin	Clonkeen	Loughrea
Attimonbeg	254	Tiaquin	Killimordaly	Loughrea
Attimonmore North	27	Tiaquin	Killimordaly	Loughrea
Attimonmore South	633	Kilconnell	Killimordaly	Loughrea
Attiregan	469	Kilconnell	Ballymacward	Ballinasloe
Attirowerty	498	Ballynahinch	Ballynakill	Clifden
Attithomasrevagh	81	Galway	Rahoon	Galway
Attyshonock	291	Galway	Rahoon	Galway
Aubwee	69	Moycullen	Moycullen	Galway
Aubwee	37	Galway	Rahoon	Galway
Aucloggeen	265	Clare	Annaghdown	Galway
Aughnanure	244	Moycullen	Kilcummin	Oughterard
**Aughrim**	Town	Kilconnell	Aughrim	Ballinasloe
Aughrim Plots (or Garrynamishaun)	125	Kilconnell	Aughrim	Ballinasloe
Aughrus Beg	443	Ballynahinch	Omey	Clifden
Aughrus More	482	Ballynahinch	Omey	Clifden
Avery Island	2	Ballynahinch	Moyrus	Clifden
Avough Island	2	Kiltartan	Kinvarradoorus	Gort
Back	39	Clonmacnowen	Kilcloony	Ballinasloe
Backpark	109	Athenry	Kiltullagh	Loughrea
Ballagh	170	Galway	Rahoon	Galway
Ballagh	78	Clare	Belclare	Tuam
Ballagh East	142	Clonmacnowen	Clontuskert	Ballinasloe
Ballagh East	80	Dunmore	Dunmore	Tuam
Ballagh West	163	Clonmacnowen	Clontuskert	Ballinasloe
Ballagh West	70	Dunmore	Dunmore	Tuam
Ballaghalode	285	Ballymoe	Tuam	Tuam
Ballaghaugeag East	257	Ballymoe	Kilcroan	Glennamaddy
Ballaghaugeag West	384	Ballymoe	Kilcroan	Glennamaddy
Ballaghbaun	268	Clare	Belclare	Tuam
Ballaghdacker	48	Killian	Athleague	Mountbellew
Ballaghdorragha	325	Ballymoe	Dunmore	Glennamaddy
Ballaghduff	471	Tiaquin	Kilkerrin	Glennamaddy
Ballaghnagrosheen	387	Tiaquin	Killoscobe	Mountbellew
Ballaghymurry	403	Ballymoe	Kilcroan	Glennamaddy
Ballard	250	Ross	Cong	Oughterard
Ballard East	65	Galway	Rahoon	Galway
Ballard West	29	Galway	Rahoon	Galway
Ballardiggan	141	Kiltartan	Kilbeacanty	Gort
Ballina	738	Clare	Killererin	Tuam
Ballina	63	Loughrea	Isertkelly	Loughrea
Ballinaboy	298	Ballynahinch	Ballindoon	Clifden
Ballinafad	871	Ballynahinch	Moyrus	Clifden
Ballinaleama	121	Ballynahinch	Ballindoon	Clifden
Ballinapeaka	109	Ballymoe	Boyounagh	Glennamaddy
**Ballinasloe**	Town	Clonmacnowen	Kilcloony	Ballinasloe
Ballinastack	294	Ballymoe	Boyounagh	Glennamaddy
Ballincurry	633	Ballymoe	Ballynakill	Glennamaddy
Ballinderreen	186	Dunkellin	Drumacoo	Gort
Ballinderry	544	Clare	Cummer	Tuam
Ballinderry	496	Kilconnell	Kilconnell	Ballinasloe
Ballindooly	497	Galway	Oranmore	Galway
Ballindrimna	250	Leitrim	Tynagh	Loughrea
Ballinduff	297	Clare	Kilcoona	Tuam
Ballinduff	238	Kiltartan	Ardrahan	Gort
Ballinfoile	256	Galway	St. Nicholas	Galway
Balling	175	Ballymoe	Ballynakill	Glennamaddy
Ballingarry	326	Dunkellin	Kilchreest	Loughrea
Ballingarry	274	Loughrea	Kilconickny	Loughrea
Ballingatta	144	Tiaquin	Moylough	Mountbellew
Ballinillaun	284	Dunkellin	Stradbally	Galway
Ballinlass	572	Killian	Ballynakill	Mountbellew
Ballinlass	280	Killian	Killeroran	Mountbellew
Ballinlass	165	Ballymoe	Dunmore	Glennamaddy
Ballinlaur	140	Leitrim	Kilreekill	Loughrea
Ballinlawless	1349	Leitrim	Kilteskill	Loughrea
Ballinlough	199	Leitrim	Ballynakill	Loughrea
Ballinlough	93	Kilconnell	Ballymacward	Ballinasloe
Ballinloughaun	364	Clare	Athenry	Galway
Ballinlug	98	Longford	Tiranascragh	Portumna
**Ballinphuil**	Town	Clare	Cummer	Tuam
Ballinphuil	369	Clare	Cummer	Tuam
Ballinphuill	285	Tiaquin	Boyounagh	Glennamaddy
Ballinphuill	199	Kilconnell	Killallaghtan	Ballinasloe
Ballinphuill	190	Tiaquin	Kilkerrin	Glennamaddy
Ballinphuill	142	Dunmore	Tuam	Tuam
Ballinphuill	119	Kilconnell	Grange	Loughrea
Ballinrooaun	648	Tiaquin	Moylough	Mountbellew
Ballinrooaun	361	Longford	Killoran	Ballinasloe
Ballinrooaun	104	Loughrea	Ardrahan	Loughrea
Ballinrooaun	100	Leitrim	Clonrush	Scarriff
Ballinsmaul	109	Leitrim	Tynagh	Portumna
Ballintava	502	Ballymoe	Dunmore	Glennamaddy
Ballintemple	286	Dunkellin	Oranmore	Galway
Ballintise	222	Dunmore	Dunmore	Tuam
Ballintleva	549	Moycullen	Kilcummin	Galway
Ballintleva	301	Clare	Killower	Tuam
Ballintleva	297	Tiaquin	Killosolan	Mountbellew
Ballintober	203	Clare	Cummer	Tuam
Ballintober	132	Kilconnell	Killallaghtan	Ballinasloe
Ballintober	25	Kilconnell	Kilconnell	Ballinasloe
Ballintober East	269	Leitrim	Kilreekill	Ballinasloe
Ballintober West	248	Leitrim	Kilreekill	Loughrea
Ballinvoher	136	Clare	Lackagh	Galway
Ballinvoher	124	Clare	Donaghpatrick	Tuam
Ballinvoher North	236	Killian	Killeroran	Mountbellew
Ballinvoher South	355	Killian	Killeroran	Mountbellew
Ballooly	18	Longford	Kiltormer	Ballinasloe
Ballooly (Eyre)	38	Longford	Killoran	Ballinasloe
Ballooly (Kelly)	56	Longford	Killoran	Ballinasloe
Ballooly (McDermott)	74	Longford	Killoran	Ballinasloe
Ballyaneen North	138	Kiltartan	Kiltartan	Gort
Ballyaneen South	130	Kiltartan	Kiltartan	Gort
Ballyara	300	Tiaquin	Killoscobe	Mountbellew
Ballyargadaun	486	Leitrim	Leitrim	Loughrea
Ballybaan Beg	441	Galway	St. Nicholas	Galway
Ballybaan More	222	Galway	St. Nicholas	Galway
Ballybackagh	318	Clare	Athenry	Galway
Ballybackagh	78	Loughrea	Ardrahan	Loughrea
Ballybanagher	270	Clare	Cummer	Tuam
Ballybaun	287	Killian	Killian	Mountbellew
Ballybaun	271	Tiaquin	Abbeyknockmoy	Tuam
Ballybaun	247	Kiltartan	Kilmacduagh	Gort
Ballybaun	236	Kilconnell	Ahascragh	Mountbellew
Ballybaun	229	Loughrea	Kilconickny	Loughrea
Ballybaun	219	Tiaquin	Moylough	Mountbellew
Ballybaun	154	Clare	Kilcoona	Tuam
Ballybaun	154	Kilconnell	Killallaghtan	Ballinasloe
Ballybaun	139	Loughrea	Killogilleen	Loughrea
Ballybaun	115	Dunkellin	Ardrahan	Gort
Ballyboggan	534	Kilconnell	Monivea	Loughrea
Ballyboggan	336	Kilconnell	Ahascragh	Mountbellew
Ballyboy	671	Dunmore	Kilbennan	Tuam
Ballyboy	363	Kiltartan	Beagh	Gort
Ballyboy	136	Dunkellin	Ardrahan	Gort
Ballybranagan	153	Kiltartan	Kinvarradoorus	Gort
Ballybrian	178	Clonmacnowen	Killallaghtan	Ballinasloe
Ballybrit	325	Galway	St. Nicholas	Galway
Ballybroder	372	Loughrea	Loughrea	Loughrea
Ballybroder	135	Loughrea	Kilmeen	Loughrea
Ballybrone	770	Clare	Athenry	Galway
Ballybuck North	342	Kiltartan	Killinny	Gort
Ballybuck South	223	Kiltartan	Killinny	Gort
Ballyburke	127	Galway	Rahoon	Galway
Ballycahalan	461	Kiltartan	Kilbeacanty	Gort
Ballycahill	156	Longford	Killimorbologue	Portumna
Ballycasey	413	Clare	Kilcoona	Tuam
Ballyclery	708	Dunkellin	Killeenavarra	Gort
Ballycolgan	192	Clare	Kilkilvery	Tuam
Ballyconlought	291	Clare	Cargin	Tuam
Ballyconneely	1339	Ballynahinch	Ballindoon	Clifden
Ballyconnell	245	Kiltartan	Kilbeacanty	Gort
Ballycoony	305	Loughrea	Killeenadeema	Loughrea
Ballycorban	120	Leitrim	Ballynakill	Loughrea
Ballycrossaun	211	Longford	Tiranascragh	Portumna
Ballycuddy	301	Dunkellin	Kilchreest	Loughrea
Ballycuirke East	130	Moycullen	Moycullen	Galway
Ballycuirke West	323	Moycullen	Moycullen	Galway
Ballyculloo	131	Dunkellin	Kilcolgan	Gort
Ballydaly	46	Leitrim	Ballynakill	Loughrea
Ballydavid	339	Leitrim	Kilcooly	Loughrea
Ballydavid Middle	201	Athenry	Athenry	Galway
Ballydavid North	197	Athenry	Athenry	Galway
Ballydavid South	477	Athenry	Athenry	Loughrea
Ballydonagh	629	Longford	Kiltormer	Ballinasloe
Ballydonagh	105	Leitrim	Tynagh	Portumna
Ballydonnellan	401	Clare	Kilcoona	Tuam
Ballydonnellan East	296	Kilconnell	Killallaghtan	Ballinasloe
Ballydonnellan West	273	Kilconnell	Killallaghtan	Ballinasloe
Ballydoogan	690	Leitrim	Kilmeen	Loughrea
Ballydoogan	252	Kilconnell	Fohanagh	Mountbellew
Ballydoolough	719	Ross	Ross	Oughterard
Ballydotia	311	Moycullen	Moycullen	Galway
Ballydotia East	130	Clare	Belclare	Tuam
Ballydotia West	124	Clare	Belclare	Tuam
Ballyedmond	650	Ballymoe	Clonbern	Glennamaddy
Ballyeighter	257	Kiltartan	Kilbeacanty	Gort
Ballyeighter	249	Clonmacnowen	Aughrim	Ballinasloe
Ballyeighter	153	Leitrim	Kilteskill	Loughrea
Ballyeighter (Dowdall)	142	Clonmacnowen	Ahascragh	Ballinasloe
Ballyeighter (Mahon)	214	Clonmacnowen	Ahascragh	Ballinasloe
Ballyfinegan	120	Ballymoe	Kilbegnet	Glennamaddy
Ballyfintan	328	Leitrim	Abbeygormacan	Loughrea
Ballyfruit	168	Clare	Kilkilvery	Tuam
Ballygaddy	189	Dunmore	Kilbennan	Tuam
Ballygally	420	Moycullen	Kilcummin	Oughterard
**Ballygar**	Town	Killian	Killeroran	Mountbellew
Ballygar	293	Killian	Killeroran	Mountbellew
Ballygarraun	667	Loughrea	Isertkelly	Loughrea
Ballygarraun	173	Galway	Oranmore	Galway
Ballygarraun North	224	Athenry	Athenry	Loughrea
Ballygarraun South	238	Athenry	Athenry	Loughrea
Ballygarraun West	250	Athenry	Athenry	Loughrea
Ballygarriff	127	Dunkellin	Killeely	Gort
Ballygasty	280	Loughrea	Loughrea	Loughrea
Ballygeagin	109	Kiltartan	Beagh	Gort
Ballyglass	722	Tiaquin	Clonkeen	Loughrea
Ballyglass	560	Kilconnell	Kilconnell	Ballinasloe
Ballyglass	211	Leitrim	Tynagh	Portumna
Ballyglass	195	Clare	Athenry	Galway
Ballyglass	145	Clonmacnowen	Ahascragh	Ballinasloe
Ballyglass	44	Leitrim	Ballynakill	Loughrea
Ballyglass	44	Leitrim	Clonrush	Scarriff
Ballyglass (Mahon)	274	Clonmacnowen	Ahascragh	Ballinasloe
Ballyglass East	254	Dunkellin	Ardrahan	Loughrea
Ballyglass Middle	68	Ballymoe	Kilcroan	Glennamaddy
Ballyglass North	195	Ballymoe	Kilcroan	Glennamaddy
Ballyglass South	555	Ballymoe	Kilcroan	Glennamaddy
Ballyglass West	335	Dunkellin	Ardrahan	Gort
Ballyglass West	184	Ballymoe	Kilcroan	Glennamaddy
Ballyglooneen	427	Clare	Kilmoylan	Tuam
Ballygowan	741	Leitrim	Ballynakill	Loughrea
Ballygrany	151	Tiaquin	Ballymacward	Loughrea
Ballygunneen	456	Loughrea	Killinan	Loughrea
Ballyhale	352	Clare	Cargin	Tuam
Ballyhanry	137	Longford	Lickmolassy	Portumna
Ballyhard	621	Ballymoe	Boyounagh	Glennamaddy
Ballyhinch	718	Leitrim	Clonrush	Scarriff
Ballyhogan	349	Leitrim	Abbeygormacan	Loughrea
Ballyhoolahan	61	Clonmacnowen	Aughrim	Ballinasloe
Ballyhoose	283	Longford	Clonfert	Ballinasloe
Ballyhugh	311	Kiltartan	Kilmacduagh	Gort
Ballykeaghra	282	Clare	Cummer	Tuam
Ballykeeran	331	Loughrea	Lickerrig	Loughrea
Ballykilladea	135	Kiltartan	Killinny	Gort
Ballyknock	66	Loughrea	Kilteskill	Loughrea
Ballyknock	9	Loughrea	Killeenadeema	Loughrea
Ballylahy	154	Kiltartan	Kilthomas	Gort
Ballylara	267	Dunkellin	Ardrahan	Gort
Ballylee	219	Kiltartan	Kiltartan	Gort
Ballylee	82	Kiltartan	Kilthomas	Gort
Ballylee	71	Clare	Annaghdown	Galway
Ballyleen	176	Leitrim	Tynagh	Portumna
Ballylennan	56	Kiltartan	Kilmacduagh	Gort
Ballylin East	174	Dunkellin	Killogilleen	Loughrea
Ballylin West	245	Dunkellin	Killogilleen	Loughrea
Ballylouge	415	Clonmacnowen	Killoran	Ballinasloe
Ballyloughan	98	Kiltartan	Kiltartan	Gort
**Ballyloughaun**	Town	Galway	St. Nicholas	Galway
Ballymabilla	867	Kilconnell	Killallaghtan	Ballinasloe
Ballymaconry (or Kingstown Glebe)	78	Ballynahinch	Omey	Clifden
Ballymacward	223	Tiaquin	Ballymacward	Ballinasloe
Ballymageraghty	276	Tiaquin	Moylough	Mountbellew
Ballymaglancy	50	Ross	Cong	Oughterard
Ballymanagh	449	Longford	Clontuskert	Ballinasloe
Ballymanagh	96	Dunkellin	Killogilleen	Loughrea
Ballymaquiff North	249	Dunkellin	Ardrahan	Gort
Ballymaquiff South	108	Kiltartan	Ardrahan	Gort
Ballymarcahaun	194	Kiltartan	Ardrahan	Gort
Ballymariscal	80	Dunkellin	Ardrahan	Gort
Ballymartin	68	Longford	Lickmolassy	Portumna
Ballymary	41	Dunmore	Addergoole	Tuam
Ballymerret	285	Leitrim	Leitrim	Loughrea
Ballymoat	418	Dunmore	Tuam	Tuam
**Ballymoe**	Town	Ballymoe	Drumatemple	Glennamaddy
Ballymoneen	583	Clare	Lackagh	Galway
Ballymoneen	146	Loughrea	Killogilleen	Loughrea
Ballymoneen East	37	Galway	Rahoon	Galway
Ballymoneen West	87	Galway	Rahoon	Galway
Ballymoney North	173	Dunmore	Dunmore	Tuam
Ballymoney South	259	Dunmore	Dunmore	Tuam
Ballymore	384	Dunkellin	Killora	Loughrea
Ballymore	368	Dunkellin	Killeenavarra	Gort
Ballymore Lower	366	Longford	Clonfert	Ballinasloe
Ballymore Upper	246	Longford	Clonfert	Ballinasloe
Ballymulfaig	164	Kiltartan	Kilmacduagh	Gort
Ballymullen	142	Loughrea	Killinan	Loughrea
Ballymurphy	26	Kiltartan	Kiltartan	Gort
Ballymurry	177	Athenry	Kiltullagh	Loughrea
Ballynabanaba	442	Kilconnell	Fohanagh	Ballinasloe
Ballynaboorkagh	319	Tiaquin	Monivea	Tuam
Ballynabucky	331	Dunkellin	Killeely	Gort
Ballynabucky	117	Kiltartan	Kilthomas	Gort
Ballynaclogh	427	Kilconnell	Killallaghtan	Ballinasloe
Ballynacloghy	370	Dunkellin	Ballynacourty	Galway
Ballynacorra (Davies)	111	Killian	Killian	Mountbellew
Ballynacorra (Ffrench)	349	Killian	Killian	Mountbellew
Ballynacorra (Netterville)	110	Killian	Killian	Mountbellew
Ballynacourty	469	Dunkellin	Ballynacourty	Galway
Ballynacreg North	224	Clare	Cummer	Tuam
Ballynacreg South	440	Clare	Cummer	Tuam
Ballynacregga	234	Clare	Cargin	Tuam
Ballynacurragh	535	Loughrea	Kilchreest	Loughrea
Ballynagar	108	Leitrim	Ballynakill	Loughrea
Ballynageeha	214	Dunkellin	Oranmore	Galway
Ballynageeragh	175	Dunkellin	Kilconierin	Loughrea
Ballynagittagh	259	Dunmore	Kilconla	Tuam
Ballynagran	197	Dunkellin	Killeeneen	Gort
Ballynagran	131	Loughrea	Kilchreest	Loughrea
Ballynagreeve	306	Loughrea	Killeenadeema	Loughrea
Ballynahallia	668	Moycullen	Moycullen	Galway
Ballynahattina	269	Tiaquin	Killosolan	Mountbellew
Ballynaheskeragh	431	Longford	Killimorbologue	Portumna
Ballynahinch	790	Ballynahinch	Moyrus	Clifden
Ballynahistil	191	Leitrim	Kilcooly	Loughrea
Ballynahivnia	161	Loughrea	Kilconierin	Loughrea
Ballynahown	267	Moycullen	Rahoon	Galway
Ballynahown	98	Athenry	Lickerrig	Loughrea
Ballynahown	72	Clonmacnowen	Aughrim	Ballinasloe
Ballynahown East	63	Galway	Rahoon	Galway
Ballynahown North	206	Moycullen	Killannin	Galway
Ballynahown South	616	Moycullen	Killannin	Galway
Ballynahowna	358	Ballymoe	Kilbegnet	Glennamaddy
Ballynahowna	257	Loughrea	Kilthomas	Gort
Ballynahowna	81	Killian	Ballynakill	Mountbellew
Ballynakill	596	Longford	Clonfert	Ballinasloe
Ballynakill	385	Kiltartan	Beagh	Gort
Ballynakill	287	Ballymoe	Ballynakill	Glennamaddy
Ballynakill	146	Leitrim	Ballynakill	Loughrea
Ballynakilla	335	Tiaquin	Abbeyknockmoy	Tuam
Ballynakilla	170	Clare	Killererin	Tuam
Ballynakillew	108	Clare	Cargin	Tuam
Ballynakillew	84	Leitrim	Clonrush	Scarriff
Ballynalacka	122	Clare	Cargin	Tuam
Ballynalahy	249	Killian	Killian	Mountbellew
Ballynamanagh East	591	Dunkellin	Ballynacourty	Galway
Ballynamanagh West	396	Dunkellin	Ballynacourty	Galway
Ballynamannin	203	Dunkellin	Killora	Loughrea
Ballynamantan	100	Kiltartan	Kiltartan	Gort
Ballynamockagh	262	Clonmacnowen	Kilcloony	Ballinasloe
Ballynamona	427	Tiaquin	Moylough	Mountbellew
Ballynamona	215	Tiaquin	Abbeyknockmoy	Tuam
Ballynamona	169	Leitrim	Duniry	Portumna
Ballynamona	147	Leitrim	Clonrush	Scarriff
Ballynamona	89	Dunmore	Tuam	Tuam
Ballynamona	54	Ross	Cong	Oughterard
Ballynamucka	68	Dunkellin	Kilconickny	Loughrea
Ballynamuddagh	273	Longford	Donanaghta	Portumna
Ballynamuddagh	214	Clonmacnowen	Killallaghtan	Ballinasloe
Ballynamurdoo	200	Leitrim	Abbeygormacan	Loughrea
Ballynanulty	254	Tiaquin	Killimordaly	Loughrea
Ballynapark	274	Clare	Killererin	Tuam
Ballynascragh	97	Dunkellin	Killogilleen	Loughrea
Ballynasheeog	178	Clare	Lackagh	Galway
Ballynasoorag Eighter	144	Tiaquin	Killoscobe	Mountbellew
Ballynasoorag Oughter	249	Tiaquin	Killoscobe	Mountbellew
Ballynastaig	214	Kiltartan	Kilmacduagh	Gort
Ballynastaig	175	Dunkellin	Killeely	Gort
Ballynastucka	426	Clare	Kilmoylan	Tuam
Ballynew	493	Ballynahinch	Ballynakill	Clifden
Ballynew	160	Longford	Lickmolassy	Portumna
Ballynew	140	Clare	Kilcoona	Tuam
Ballynew	24	Clonmacnowen	Clontuskert	Ballinasloe
Ballyroe	171	Ballymoe	Templetogher	Glennamaddy
Ballyscully	131	Leitrim	Duniry	Loughrea
Ballyshea	413	Dunkellin	Killinan	Loughrea
Ballysheedy	365	Kiltartan	Kilmacduagh	Gort
Ballyshrule	223	Longford	Lickmolassy	Portumna
Ballyskeagh	130	Tiaquin	Monivea	Tuam
Ballyterrim	216	Clonmacnowen	Killallaghtan	Ballinasloe
Ballytrasna	321	Dunmore	Tuam	Tuam
Ballyturick	64	Longford	Kiltormer	Ballinasloe
Ballyturin	866	Kiltartan	Kilbeacanty	Gort
Ballyvaheen	93	Longford	Abbeygormacan	Ballinasloe
Ballyvoher	159	Kiltartan	Kilmacduagh	Gort
Ballyvoneen	211	Kilconnell	Killosolan	Mountbellew
Ballyvoneen	59	Tiaquin	Ballymacward	Ballinasloe
Ballyvullaun	192	Dunkellin	Drumacoo	Gort
Ballywataire	237	Ballymoe	Dunmore	Glennamaddy
Ballywatteen & Knockauneevin	367	Longford	Tynagh	Portumna
Ballyweeann	680	Ross	Ross	Oughterard
Ballywinna	415	Dunkellin	Killora	Loughrea
Ballywulash (or Crinnage)	401	Dunkellin	Killora	Loughrea
Balrickard	270	Clare	Cargin	Tuam
Balrobuck Beg	336	Clare	Annaghdown	Tuam
Balrobuck More	259	Clare	Annaghdown	Tuam
Banagher	399	Dunmore	Liskeevy	Tuam
Banraghbaun North	383	Moycullen	Killannin	Galway
Banraghbaun South	915	Moycullen	Killannin	Galway
Banuyknav	148	Leitrim	Ballynakill	Loughrea
Barbersfort	387	Clare	Killererin	Tuam
Bargarriff	196	Leitrim	Clonrush	Scarriff
**Barna**	Town	Galway	Rahoon	Galway
Barna	295	Ballymoe	Boyounagh	Glennamaddy
Barna	134	Kiltartan	Beagh	Gort
Barna	124	Galway	Rahoon	Galway
Barnaboy	299	Clare	Athenry	Galway
Barnaboy	280	Leitrim	Ballynakill	Loughrea
Barnaboy	209	Clare	Kilkilvery	Tuam
Barnaboy	169	Longford	Clontuskert	Ballinasloe
Barnacragh	57	Clonmacnowen	Kilcloony	Ballinasloe
Barnacranny	101	Galway	Rahoon	Galway
Barnacurra	162	Killian	Killian	Mountbellew
Barnacurragh	352	Dunmore	Tuam	Tuam
Barnaderg North	308	Clare	Killererin	Tuam
Barnaderg South	152	Clare	Killererin	Tuam
Barnagorteeny	728	Moycullen	Kilcummin	Oughterard
Barnahallia	85	Ballynahinch	Omey	Clifden
Barnahowna	1325	Ross	Ballinrobe	Ballinrobe
Barnanang	1199	Ballynahinch	Moyrus	Clifden
Barnanoraun	895	Ballynahinch	Moyrus	Clifden
Barnanoraun	366	Ballynahinch	Omey	Clifden
Barnavihall	354	Kilconnell	Kilconnell	Ballinasloe
Barnpark	79	Clonmacnowen	Clontuskert	Ballinasloe
Barnwellsgrove	174	Killian	Ballynakill	Mountbellew
Barraderry	765	Moycullen	Killannin	Oughterard
Barragarraun	192	Loughrea	Killeenadeema	Loughrea
Barrany	1181	Clare	Annaghdown	Galway
Barratleva	480	Moycullen	Kilcummin	Oughterard
Barratoor	250	Leitrim	Ballynakill	Loughrea
Barratreana	187	Dunkellin	Ardrahan	Gort
Barratrough (or Streamstown)	1000	Ballynahinch	Omey	Clifden
Barravilla	93	Clare	Annaghdown	Galway
Barrettspark	251	Clare	Athenry	Galway
Barrevagh	783	Ross	Ross	Oughterard
Barrslievenaroy	602	Ross	Ross	Oughterard
Barrusheen	114	Moycullen	Kilcummin	Oughterard
Baunmore	211	Athenry	Athenry	Loughrea
Baunmore	121	Clare	Annaghdown	Galway
Baunmore	109	Dunmore	Dunmore	Tuam
Baunoge	933	Ballynahinch	Ballynakill	Clifden
Baunoge	109	Loughrea	Loughrea	Loughrea
Baunoges	337	Tiaquin	Ballymacward	Mountbellew
Baunoges North	50	Ballymoe	Dunmore	Glennamaddy
Baunoges South	2	Ballymoe	Dunmore	Tuam
Baunragh	26	Kiltartan	Kiltartan	Gort
Bauntia	203	Leitrim	Ballynakill	Portumna
Bauttagh	43	Dunkellin	Killogilleen	Loughrea
Bawnmore (or Stonepark)	101	Clare	Donaghpatrick	Tuam
Beagh	650	Dunmore	Kilconla	Tuam
Beagh	629	Ballymoe	Templetogher	Glennamaddy
Beagh	331	Kiltartan	Beagh	Gort
Beagh (Browne)	97	Dunmore	Dunmore	Tuam
Beagh (Donnellan)	111	Dunmore	Dunmore	Tuam
Beagh Beg	362	Clare	Donaghpatrick	Tuam
Beagh Island	4	Kiltartan	Beagh	Gort
Beagh More	2316	Clare	Donaghpatrick	Tuam
Beagha	847	Ballynahinch	Moyrus	Clifden
Beaghbaun	107	Dunmore	Dunmore	Tuam
Beaghcauneen	664	Ballynahinch	Ballindoon	Clifden
Beaghroe	135	Dunmore	Tuam	Tuam
Beaghroe	39	Dunmore	Dunmore	Tuam
Beaghy Island	9	Ballynahinch	Moyrus	Clifden
Beaghy North	6	Ballynahinch	Moyrus	Clifden
Bealadangan	998	Moycullen	Killannin	Oughterard
Bealnalappa	31	Moycullen	Kilcummin	Oughterard
Bech Hill	580	Kilconnell	Grange	Loughrea
Beefield	42	Kilconnell	Killaan	Ballinasloe
Belderny North	202	Killian	Moylough	Mountbellew
Belderny South	408	Killian	Moylough	Mountbellew
Bellaconeen	57	Dunmore	Addergoole	Tuam
Bellafa	6	Kilconnell	Grange	Loughrea
Bellagad (or Rookwood)	316	Killian	Athleague	Mountbellew
Bellalegaun	82	Loughrea	Killeenadeema	Loughrea
Bellanagarraun	531	Clare	Donaghpatrick	Tuam
Bellayarha North	491	Loughrea	Bullaun	Loughrea
Bellayarha South	410	Loughrea	Bullaun	Loughrea
Belleek	312	Ballynahinch	Omey	Clifden
Belleville Demesne	245	Clare	Monivea	Galway
Belmont	1905	Dunmore	Liskeevy	Tuam
Belview (or Lissareaghaun)	969	Longford	Kiltormer	Ballinasloe
Ben Beg	304	Loughrea	Grange	Loughrea
Ben More	636	Loughrea	Grange	Loughrea
Bettyspark	30	Dunmore	Dunmore	Tuam
Big Island	44	Ross	Ross	Oughterard
Big Island	9	Moycullen	Killannin	Oughterard
Biggera Beg	362	Clare	Annaghdown	Tuam
Biggera More	306	Clare	Annaghdown	Tuam
Bigisland	168	Longford	Meelick	Portumna
Bilberry Island	2	Moycullen	Kilcummin	Oughterard
Billymore (or Carrowntober)	303	Moycullen	Kilcummin	Oughterard
Bingarra	347	Tiaquin	Monivea	Loughrea
Binn	89	Tiaquin	Monivea	Loughrea
Birbeg Island	2	Ballynahinch	Moyrus	Clifden
Birchhall (or Curraveha)	116	Moycullen	Kilcummin	Oughterard
Birchpark	48	Leitrim	Clonrush	Scarriff
Birmingham Demesne	398	Dunmore	Tuam	Tuam
Birmore Island	32	Ballynahinch	Moyrus	Clifden
Black Weir	1	Kiltartan	Kinvarradoorus	Gort
Blackacre	63	Dunmore	Tuam	Tuam
Blackgarden	178	Dunkellin	Kilconickny	Loughrea
Blackrock	125	Loughrea	Kilthomas	Loughrea
Blacksticks	104	Longford	Clonfert	Ballinasloe
Blean	223	Athenry	Athenry	Loughrea
Bleannagloos	373	Killian	Killian	Mountbellew
Bleanoran (or Burnthouse)	132	Moycullen	Killannin	Oughterard
Blindwell	1412	Dunmore	Kilconla	Tuam
Boadaun	289	Dunmore	Kilconla	Tuam
Boggaun	98	Loughrea	Kilchreest	Loughrea
Boggauns	420	Killian	Killian	Mountbellew
Boggauns	416	Ballymoe	Kilbegnet	Glennamaddy
Bogpark	138	Clonmacnowen	Clontuskert	Ballinasloe
Bohaboy	637	Loughrea	Killeenadeema	Loughrea
Bohatch North	1090	Leitrim	Inishcaltra	Scarriff
Bohatch South	453	Leitrim	Inishcaltra	Scarriff
Bohaun	443	Ross	Ross	Oughterard
Boheeshal	2542	Ballynahinch	Moyrus	Clifden
Boherbannagh	299	Killian	Killian	Mountbellew
Bohercuill	269	Clare	Kilcoona	Tuam
Boherduff	163	Dunkellin	Kilconickny	Loughrea
Bohilmore Island	8	Moycullen	Moycullen	Galway
Bohoona East	418	Moycullen	Killannin	Galway
Bohoona West	494	Moycullen	Killannin	Galway
Bolag	433	Leitrim	Ballynakill	Loughrea
Boley	72	Longford	Kilmalinoge	Portumna
Boley	60	Longford	Lickmolassy	Portumna
Boleybeg	520	Loughrea	Killeenadeema	Loughrea
Boleybeg & Killimor	105	Longford	Killimorbologue	Portumna
Boleybeg East	153	Galway	Rahoon	Galway
Boleybeg West	58	Galway	Rahoon	Galway
Boleycurheen	95	Loughrea	Killeenadeema	Loughrea
Boleydorragha	20	Dunkellin	Kilconierin	Loughrea
Boleylaan	139	Dunmore	Tuam	Tuam
Boleymore	59	Kilconnell	Grange	Loughrea
Boleynagoagh North	614	Leitrim	Clonrush	Scarriff
Boleynagoagh South	248	Leitrim	Clonrush	Scarriff
Boleynaminna	184	Longford	Tynagh	Portumna
Boleynanollag	135	Leitrim	Ballynakill	Portumna
Boleynasruhaun	167	Galway	Rahoon	Galway
Boleyneendorrish	2168	Loughrea	Ardrahan	Gort
Boleyphaudeen	198	Kiltartan	Beagh	Gort
Boleyroe	159	Longford	Abbeygormacan	Portumna
Boleythomas	238	Ballymoe	Kilbegnet	Glennamaddy
Boleyvaunaun	29	Moycullen	Killannin	Oughterard
Bolinsheen	251	Clare	Annaghdown	Tuam
Boliska Eighter	1401	Moycullen	Killannin	Galway
Boliska Oughter	1669	Moycullen	Killannin	Galway
Boocaun	169	Ross	Ross	Oughterard
Booey	6	Ross	Cong	Oughterard
Bookalagh	680	Ballymoe	Kilcroan	Glennamaddy
Bookeen	391	Loughrea	Killeenadeema	Loughrea
Bookeen North	38	Athenry	Lickerrig	Loughrea
Bookeen South	399	Dunkellin	Lickerrig	Loughrea
Boolagare	543	Ballynahinch	Ballindoon	Clifden
Boolard	372	Ballynahinch	Omey	Clifden
Boolard Island	12	Ballynahinch	Omey	Clifden
Bottom	100	Athenry	Athenry	Loughrea
Boughil	432	Killian	Taghboy	Mountbellew
Bouluskeagh (or Flowerhill)	321	Longford	Tynagh	Portumna
Bovinion	771	Killian	Moylough	Mountbellew
Bovroughaun	1750	Moycullen	Killannin	Galway
Boyhill	180	Athenry	Athenry	Loughrea
Boyounagh Beg	325	Tiaquin	Boyounagh	Glennamaddy
Boyounagh More	714	Tiaquin	Boyounagh	Glennamaddy
Braadillaun	4	Ballynahinch	Ballynakill	Clifden
**Brackernagh**	Town	Clonmacnowen	Kilcloony	Ballinasloe
Brackernagh (Clancarty)	85	Clonmacnowen	Kilcloony	Ballinasloe
Brackernagh (Persse)	108	Clonmacnowen	Kilcloony	Ballinasloe
Brackery	108	Leitrim	Duniry	Loughrea
Brackery North	124	Leitrim	Tynagh	Portumna
Brackery South	197	Leitrim	Tynagh	Portumna
Bracklagh	397	Ballymoe	Kilcroan	Glennamaddy
Bracklagh	216	Leitrim	Duniry	Portumna
Bracklagh	168	Dunmore	Dunmore	Tuam
Bracklagh	115	Ballymoe	Clonbern	Glennamaddy
Bracklagh	7	Dunmore	Tuam	Tuam
Bracklagh Grange	98	Leitrim	Duniry	Loughrea
Bracklin	458	Ballymoe	Dunamon	Roscommon
Brackloon	840	Athenry	Killimordaly	Loughrea
Brackloon	364	Ballymoe	Clonbern	Tuam
Brackloon	300	Clare	Kilmoylan	Tuam
Brackloon	288	Longford	Clonfert	Ballinasloe
Brackloon	215	Kilconnell	Killallaghtan	Ballinasloe
Brackloon	83	Clare	Killererin	Tuam
Brackloon	76	Kilconnell	Grange	Loughrea
Brackloon	65	Dunkellin	Killeenavarra	Gort
Brackloonbeg	436	Athenry	Kiltullagh	Loughrea
Brannock Island	48	Aran	Inishmore	Galway
Breandrim	177	Ross	Cong	Oughterard
Breanloughaun	149	Dunkellin	Oranmore	Galway
Breanra	138	Ballymoe	Dunmore	Tuam
Bredagh	345	Clare	Kilcoona	Tuam
Bredagh	257	Kilconnell	Killosolan	Mountbellew
Breenaun	1069	Ross	Ross	Oughterard
Bridgepark	45	Leitrim	Ballynakill	Loughrea
Brierfield	77	Tiaquin	Moylough	Mountbellew
Brierfield (Blake)	138	Tiaquin	Abbeyknockmoy	Tuam
Brierfield (Burke)	362	Tiaquin	Abbeyknockmoy	Tuam
Brierfield (North)	37	Tiaquin	Abbeyknockmoy	Tuam
Brierfield (Stevens)	136	Tiaquin	Abbeyknockmoy	Tuam
Brierfield (Toole)	204	Tiaquin	Abbeyknockmoy	Tuam
Brierfield South	551	Tiaquin	Abbeyknockmoy	Tuam
Brierfort	358	Ballymoe	Templetogher	Glennamaddy
Brimnoge	2	Longford	Meelick	Portumna
Brockagh	444	Clare	Cummer	Tuam
Brockagh	239	Galway	Oranmore	Galway
Brockagh	216	Dunmore	Tuam	Tuam
Brockagh	115	Dunkellin	Killeeneen	Gort
Brooklodge Demesne	204	Clare	Killererin	Tuam
Brownville	155	Galway	Rahoon	Galway
Brucken	72	Dunkellin	Killogilleen	Loughrea
Brusk	259	Athenry	Kiltullagh	Loughrea
Budellagh and Cloghbrack	166	Longford	Donanaghta	Portumna
Buffy	567	Moycullen	Killannin	Oughterard
Bulcaun	109	Dunmore	Kilconla	Tuam
Bullaun	747	Clare	Kilmoylan	Tuam
Bullaun	141	Loughrea	Bullaun	Loughrea
Bullaunagh	178	Loughrea	Ardrahan	Gort
Bullaunagh	99	Kiltartan	Kilthomas	Gort
Bunagarraun	242	Dunmore	Kilbennan	Tuam
Bunanraun	87	Clare	Kilkilvery	Tuam
Bunatober	461	Clare	Annaghdown	Tuam
Bunavan	165	Kilconnell	Ahascragh	Mountbellew
Buncam	25	Killian	Killian	Mountbellew
Bundouglas	88	Ballynahinch	Ballynakill	Clifden
Bunnaconeen	119	Clare	Kilkilvery	Tuam
Bunnagippaun	331	Moycullen	Kilcummin	Oughterard
Bunnaglass	387	Kiltartan	Kilthomas	Gort
Bunnahevelly Beg	139	Clare	Annaghdown	Tuam
Bunnahevelly More	547	Clare	Annaghdown	Tuam
Bunnahown	671	Ballynahinch	Moyrus	Clifden
Bunnakill	541	Moycullen	Kilcummin	Oughterard
Bunnasillagh	237	Clare	Donaghpatrick	Tuam
Bunnasrah	373	Kiltartan	Beagh	Gort
Bunnaviskaun	1592	Ross	Ross	Oughterard
Bunoghanaun	472	Clare	Annaghdown	Tuam
Bunowen	1452	Ballynahinch	Ballynakill	Clifden
Bunowen Beg	566	Ballynahinch	Ballindoon	Clifden
Bunowen Island	1	Longford	Lickmolassy	Portumna
Bunowen More	243	Ballynahinch	Ballindoon	Clifden
Bunscanniff	1102	Moycullen	Kilcummin	Oughterard
Burnthouse (or Bleanoran)	132	Moycullen	Killannin	Oughterard
Burr Island	2	Ross	Cong	Oughterard
Burroge	475	Loughrea	Killeenadeema	Loughrea
Burroge	99	Leitrim	Ballynakill	Loughrea
Bush Island	1	Dunkellin	Ballynacourty	Galway
Bushfield	290	Dunkellin	Oranmore	Galway
Bushfield	204	Loughrea	Kilconickny	Loughrea
Bushtown	181	Ballymoe	Boyounagh	Glennamaddy
Bushy Island	22	Longford	Clonfert	Ballinasloe
Bushy Island	16	Leitrim	Inishcaltra	Scarriff
Bushypark	91	Galway	Rahoon	Galway
Caher	747	Ballynahinch	Moyrus	Clifden
Caher	163	Longford	Lickmolassy	Portumna
Caher	66	Clonmacnowen	Kilcloony	Ballinasloe
Caher	58	Longford	Killimorbologue	Portumna
Caheradangan	80	Dunkellin	Killora	Loughrea
Caheradine	233	Dunkellin	Killeeneen	Gort
Caherakeeny	269	Clare	Donaghpatrick	Tuam
Caherakilleen	89	Dunkellin	Kilconierin	Loughrea
Caheraloggy East	77	Dunkellin	Killeely	Gort
Caheraloggy West	132	Dunkellin	Killeely	Gort
Caherapheepa	165	Dunkellin	Killeeneen	Gort
Caherateemore North	552	Clare	Lackagh	Galway
Caherateemore South	369	Clare	Lackagh	Galway
Caherateige	343	Dunkellin	Ardrahan	Gort
Caheratrim	458	Loughrea	Killeenadeema	Loughrea
Caheratrim	250	Dunkellin	Ardrahan	Gort
Caheravoley	412	Clare	Kilmoylan	Tuam
Caherawoneen North	370	Kiltartan	Kinvarradoorus	Gort
Caherawoneen South	485	Kiltartan	Kinvarradoorus	Gort
Caherbrian	34	Kiltartan	Beagh	Gort
Caherbriskaun	373	Clare	Athenry	Galway
Caherbroder	354	Kiltartan	Beagh	Gort
Caherbulligin	160	Dunkellin	Killeeneen	Gort
Cahercarney	445	Kiltartan	Kinvarradoorus	Gort
Cahercon	427	Kiltartan	Killinny	Gort
Cahercormick	35	Dunkellin	Kilconierin	Loughrea
Cahercrea East	326	Loughrea	Killeenadeema	Loughrea
Cahercrea West	92	Loughrea	Killeenadeema	Loughrea
Cahercrin	325	Dunkellin	Killeeneen	Loughrea
Caherdaly	221	Dunkellin	Ardrahan	Gort
Caherduff	97	Dunkellin	Ardrahan	Gort
Cahererillan	498	Kiltartan	Killinny	Gort
Caherfinesker	250	Athenry	Athenry	Loughrea
Caherfurvaus	188	Dunkellin	Killeeneen	Gort
Cahergal	260	Clare	Killererin	Tuam
Cahergal	251	Ross	Ross	Oughterard
Cahergal	248	Clare	Cargin	Tuam
Cahergal	83	Dunkellin	Killogilleen	Loughrea
Caherglassaun	273	Kiltartan	Ardrahan	Gort
Caherglassaun	241	Kiltartan	Kinvarradoorus	Gort
Cahergowan (or Summerfield)	841	Dunkellin	Claregalway	Galway
Caherhenryhoe	467	Loughrea	Kilconickny	Loughrea
Caherhugh	239	Clare	Belclare	Tuam
Caherkelly	166	Dunkellin	Ardrahan	Gort
Caherkinmonwee	38	Dunkellin	Kilconierin	Loughrea
Caherlavine	191	Loughrea	Loughrea	Loughrea
Caherlea	188	Clare	Belclare	Tuam
Caherlea	147	Dunkellin	Claregalway	Galway
Caherlea	114	Clare	Annaghdown	Galway
Caherlinny	166	Loughrea	Killinan	Loughrea
Caherlissakill	748	Tiaquin	Monivea	Tuam
Caherlustraun	156	Clare	Donaghpatrick	Tuam
Cahermacanally	199	Clare	Killursa	Tuam
Cahermore	262	Kiltartan	Kinvarradoorus	Gort
Cahermore	247	Kiltartan	Ardrahan	Gort
Cahermorris	501	Clare	Annaghdown	Tuam
Cahernagarry	818	Leitrim	Kilreekill	Loughrea
Cahernaglass	416	Tiaquin	Monivea	Tuam
Cahernagormuck	82	Loughrea	Loughrea	Loughrea
Cahernagry	83	Clare	Killererin	Tuam
Cahernaheeny	146	Clare	Kilkilvery	Tuam
Cahernahoon	177	Clare	Lackagh	Tuam
Cahernalee	187	Dunkellin	Kilconierin	Loughrea
Cahernalinsky	104	Dunkellin	Killeenavarra	Gort
Cahernaman	279	Loughrea	Kilconickny	Loughrea
Cahernamona	56	Loughrea	Kilconickny	Loughrea
Cahernamuck East	236	Loughrea	Kilconickny	Loughrea
Cahernamuck West	116	Loughrea	Kilconickny	Loughrea
Cahernashilleeny	679	Clare	Lackagh	Galway
Caheronaun	251	Loughrea	Loughrea	Loughrea
Caherpeak East	390	Dunkellin	Kilcolgan	Gort
Caherpeak West	405	Dunkellin	Kilcolgan	Gort
Caherphuca	260	Tiaquin	Abbeyknockmoy	Tuam
Caherroyn	269	Athenry	Athenry	Loughrea
Caherskeehaun	101	Dunkellin	Killogilleen	Loughrea
Cahertinny	270	Loughrea	Kilconickny	Loughrea
Caherwalter	65	Loughrea	Loughrea	Loughrea
Caherweelder	479	Dunkellin	Killeely	Gort
Calf Island	2	Longford	Lickmolassy	Portumna
Calf Island	1	Ballynahinch	Ballindoon	Clifden
Callancruck	1032	Ballynahinch	Moyrus	Clifden
Callatra	124	Leitrim	Ballynakill	Loughrea
Callow	997	Ballynahinch	Ballindoon	Clifden
Callow	336	Kilconnell	Kilconnell	Ballinasloe
Callow Beg	67	Longford	Meelick	Portumna
Callow More	120	Longford	Meelick	Portumna
Callowfinish	803	Ballynahinch	Moyrus	Clifden
Callownamuck	581	Moycullen	Kilcummin	Oughterard
Callownaskeagh	1	Clare	Cargin	Tuam
**Caltra**	Town	Tiaquin	Killosolan	Mountbellew
Caltra	651	Tiaquin	Killosolan	Mountbellew
Caltragh	537	Clare	Killower	Tuam
Caltragh	505	Longford	Clonfert	Ballinasloe
Caltragh	140	Tiaquin	Clonkeen	Loughrea
Caltragh	135	Kilconnell	Aughrim	Ballinasloe
Caltragh	129	Clare	Belclare	Tuam
Caltragh	83	Clare	Kilkilvery	Tuam
Caltraghbreedy	168	Kilconnell	Killimordaly	Loughrea
Caltraghcreen	227	Tiaquin	Killoscobe	Mountbellew
Caltraghduff	350	Killian	Taghboy	Mountbellew
Caltraghlea	482	Clonmacnowen	Kilgerrill	Ballinasloe
Caltrapallas	40	Tiaquin	Killosolan	Mountbellew
Camderry	468	Ballymoe	Kilbegnet	Glennamaddy
Camgort and Corballymore	140	Longford	Donanaghta	Portumna
Cammanagh	1241	Ross	Ross	Oughterard
Camus	250	Longford	Meelick	Portumna
Camus Eighter	1830	Moycullen	Kilcummin	Oughterard
Camus Oughter	1498	Moycullen	Kilcummin	Oughterard
Cangarrow	543	Ross	Ross	Oughterard
Cankilly	392	Longford	Clonfert	Ballinasloe
Cannaver Island	9	Ross	Cong	Oughterard
Canower	271	Ballynahinch	Moyrus	Clifden
Canrawer East	14	Moycullen	Kilcummin	Oughterard
Canrawer West	146	Moycullen	Kilcummin	Oughterard
Canteeny	145	Clare	Lackagh	Galway
Capira	204	Longford	Lickmolassy	Portumna
Cappacasheen	364	Kiltartan	Killinny	Gort
Cappacorcoge	136	Ross	Cong	Oughterard
Cappacorcoge (or Ashford)	178	Ross	Cong	Oughterard
Cappacuilla	116	Longford	Tynagh	Portumna
Cappacur	346	Leitrim	Tynagh	Portumna
Cappadavock	287	Ballymoe	Tuam	Tuam
Cappaduff	510	Leitrim	Inishcaltra	Scarriff
Cappagarriff	50	Moycullen	Kilcummin	Oughterard
Cappagh	834	Dunmore	Dunmore	Tuam
Cappagh	657	Tiaquin	Kilkerrin	Glennamaddy
Cappagh	469	Leitrim	Tynagh	Portumna
Cappagh	444	Longford	Tiranascragh	Portumna
Cappagh	423	Kilconnell	Kilgerrill	Ballinasloe
Cappagh	401	Galway	Rahoon	Galway
Cappagh	387	Killian	Killian	Mountbellew
Cappagh	336	Leitrim	Ballynakill	Loughrea
Cappagh	101	Clonmacnowen	Clontuskert	Ballinasloe
Cappagh Beg	247	Kiltartan	Killinny	Gort
Cappagh More	473	Kiltartan	Killinny	Gort
Cappagh North	40	Dunkellin	Kilconierin	Loughrea
Cappagh South	37	Dunkellin	Kilconierin	Loughrea
Cappagha	74	Leitrim	Clonrush	Scarriff
Cappaghcon	91	Leitrim	Ballynakill	Loughrea
Cappaghcon East	127	Leitrim	Ballynakill	Loughrea
Cappaghcon West	131	Leitrim	Ballynakill	Loughrea
Cappaghconbeg	62	Leitrim	Ballynakill	Loughrea
Cappaghmoyle	231	Tiaquin	Monivea	Loughrea
Cappaghnagapple (or Petersburgh)	655	Ross	Ross	Oughterard
Cappaghnanool	429	Kilconnell	Killimordaly	Loughrea
Cappaghoosh	2160	Ballynahinch	Moyrus	Clifden
Cappakeela	11	Longford	Tiranascragh	Portumna
Cappaluane	41	Longford	Clonfert	Portumna
Cappanabornia	12	Galway	St. Nicholas	Galway
Cappanacreha	1855	Ross	Ballinchalla	Ballinrobe
Cappanaghtan	321	Longford	Abbeygormacan	Ballinasloe
Cappanalaurabaun	184	Moycullen	Kilcummin	Oughterard
Cappanapisha North	121	Kiltartan	Kilmacduagh	Gort
Cappanapisha South	165	Kiltartan	Kilmacduagh	Gort
Cappanasruhaun	675	Kilconnell	Killimordaly	Loughrea
Cappanaveagh	50	Galway	Rahoon	Galway
Cappanraheen	79	Dunkellin	Killora	Loughrea
Cappantruhaun	277	Ballymoe	Dunmore	Glennamaddy
Cappantruhaun	119	Leitrim	Clonrush	Scarriff
Cappard Demesne	471	Loughrea	Kilthomas	Gort
Cappasallagh	634	Longford	Kilmalinoge	Portumna
Cappataggle	390	Kilconnell	Killallaghtan	Ballinasloe
Cappavarna	51	Kiltartan	Kilmacduagh	Gort
Cappaveha	179	Kilconnell	Killallaghtan	Ballinasloe
Caranavoodaun	102	Dunkellin	Kilcolgan	Gort
Caraun	486	Athenry	Athenry	Galway
Caraun	282	Clare	Monivea	Galway
Caraun	124	Clare	Lackagh	Galway
Caraun Beg	246	Kilconnell	Killimordaly	Loughrea
Caraun More	353	Kilconnell	Killimordaly	Loughrea
Caraunduff	193	Clare	Athenry	Galway
Caraunduff	155	Leitrim	Kilmeen	Loughrea
Caraunkeelwy	116	Clare	Lackagh	Galway
Cargin	138	Clare	Cargin	Tuam
Carheen	159	Dunkellin	Killogilleen	Loughrea
Carheenadiveane	205	Dunkellin	Killeeneen	Gort
Carheenard	274	Clare	Donaghpatrick	Tuam
Carheendoo	73	Leitrim	Leitrim	Loughrea
Carheenlea	506	Clare	Lackagh	Galway
Carheennascovoge	166	Dunkellin	Killeeneen	Loughrea
Carheens	425	Clare	Belclare	Tuam
Carheenshowagh	307	Clare	Cummer	Tuam
Carheeny	94	Clare	Annaghdown	Galway
Carheeny	62	Clare	Lackagh	Galway
Carheeny Beg	166	Kiltartan	Beagh	Gort
Carheeny More	264	Kiltartan	Beagh	Gort
Carheenybaun	278	Kiltartan	Beagh	Gort
Carhoon	245	Longford	Tynagh	Portumna
Carhoon	88	Kiltartan	Beagh	Gort
Carn	225	Loughrea	Loughrea	Loughrea
Carna	1080	Ballynahinch	Moyrus	Clifden
Carnakelly	70	Athenry	Kiltullagh	Loughrea
Carnakelly North	788	Kilconnell	Kiltullagh	Loughrea
Carnakelly South	383	Kilconnell	Kiltullagh	Loughrea
Carnanthomas	58	Dunkellin	Killora	Loughrea
Carnaun	98	Leitrim	Kilreekill	Loughrea
Carnaun	58	Dunmore	Tuam	Tuam
Carnmore	169	Clare	Athenry	Galway
Carnmore East	88	Clare	Claregalway	Galway
Carnmore West	2186	Dunkellin	Claregalway	Galway
Carra	1466	Loughrea	Killaan	Loughrea
Carra	444	Leitrim	Killoran	Loughrea
Carra Island	2	Ballynahinch	Moyrus	Clifden
Carragh	283	Kiltartan	Kilbeacanty	Gort
Carraghadoo	429	Dunkellin	Kilcolgan	Gort
Carraghy	271	Clare	Annaghdown	Galway
Carraunrevagh	80	Tiaquin	Monivea	Tuam
Carrick East	600	Ross	Cong	Oughterard
Carrick Middle	370	Ross	Cong	Oughterard
Carrick West	336	Ross	Cong	Oughterard
Carrigeen East	429	Dunkellin	Killeely	Gort
Carrigeen West	350	Dunkellin	Killeely	Gort
Carrowbaun	239	Loughrea	Lickerrig	Loughrea
Carrowbaun	197	Dunmore	Tuam	Tuam
Carrowbaun	164	Ross	Cong	Oughterard
Carrowbaun	156	Dunmore	Dunmore	Tuam
Carrowbaun East	84	Kiltartan	Kiltartan	Gort
Carrowbaun West	99	Kiltartan	Kiltartan	Gort
Carrowbeg	238	Clare	Killursa	Tuam
Carrowbeg North	186	Clare	Belclare	Tuam
Carrowbeg North	110	Clare	Annaghdown	Galway
Carrowbeg South	178	Clare	Belclare	Tuam
Carrowbeg South	122	Clare	Annaghdown	Galway
Carrowbrowne	861	Galway	Oranmore	Galway
Carrowclogh	152	Dunkellin	Kilconickny	Loughrea
Carrowconlaun	140	Clare	Donaghpatrick	Tuam
Carrowcreevanagh	156	Leitrim	Duniry	Loughrea
Carrowcrin	120	Leitrim	Ballynakill	Loughrea
Carrowculleen	238	Dunmore	Dunmore	Tuam
Carrowculleen (Hoare)	28	Dunmore	Dunmore	Tuam
Carrowferrikeen	79	Tiaquin	Moylough	Mountbellew
Carrowgarriff	659	Ross	Cong	Oughterard
Carrowgarriff	291	Kiltartan	Beagh	Gort
Carrowgarriff North	128	Dunkellin	Ardrahan	Gort
Carrowgarriff South	344	Dunkellin	Ardrahan	Gort
Carrowgorm	214	Tiaquin	Killererin	Tuam
Carrowhekeen	225	Ross	Cong	Oughterard
Carrowholla	515	Kilconnell	Ballymacward	Ballinasloe
Carrowkeel	526	Ballymoe	Dunmore	Glennamaddy
Carrowkeel	373	Athenry	Kiltullagh	Loughrea
Carrowkeel	253	Leitrim	Leitrim	Loughrea
Carrowkeel	185	Ballymoe	Dunamon	Roscommon
Carrowkeel	139	Clonmacnowen	Clontuskert	Ballinasloe
Carrowkeel	129	Ross	Cong	Oughterard
Carrowkeel	103	Tiaquin	Moylough	Mountbellew
Carrowkeel	44	Dunkellin	Oranmore	Galway
Carrowkeelanahglass	390	Ballymoe	Dunmore	Glennamaddy
Carrowkilleen	472	Kiltartan	Killinny	Gort
Carrowleana	196	Tiaquin	Kilkerrin	Glennamaddy
Carrowlustraun	116	Moycullen	Moycullen	Galway
Carrowmacowan	333	Dunmore	Kilbennan	Tuam
Carrowmanagh	449	Dunmore	Dunmore	Tuam
Carrowmanagh	300	Kilconnell	Kilconnell	Ballinasloe
Carrowmanagh	181	Tiaquin	Killererin	Tuam
Carrowmanagh	140	Moycullen	Kilcummin	Oughterard
Carrowmaneen	111	Dunkellin	Killeely	Gort
Carrowmoneash	344	Dunkellin	Oranmore	Galway
Carrowmoneen	573	Dunmore	Tuam	Tuam
Carrowmore	756	Kilconnell	Aughrim	Ballinasloe
Carrowmore	576	Loughrea	Bullaun	Loughrea
Carrowmore	515	Tiaquin	Monivea	Tuam
Carrowmore	346	Dunkellin	Kilconickny	Loughrea
Carrowmore	345	Dunkellin	Ballynacourty	Galway
Carrowmore	286	Kilconnell	Kilconnell	Ballinasloe
Carrowmore	282	Leitrim	Kilmeen	Loughrea
Carrowmore	251	Tiaquin	Moylough	Mountbellew
Carrowmore	176	Leitrim	Duniry	Loughrea
Carrowmore	127	Clare	Donaghpatrick	Tuam
Carrowmore (Cheevers)	101	Killian	Killian	Mountbellew
Carrowmore (Kelly)	51	Killian	Killian	Mountbellew
Carrowmore East	65	Clonmacnowen	Clontuskert	Ballinasloe
Carrowmore West	116	Clonmacnowen	Clontuskert	Ballinasloe
Carrowmoreknock	555	Moycullen	Kilcummin	Oughterard
Carrowmunna	190	Dunkellin	Killogilleen	Loughrea
Carrowmunniagh	227	Dunmore	Dunmore	Tuam
Carrownabo	330	Tiaquin	Moylough	Mountbellew
Carrownacregg East	185	Tiaquin	Killoscobe	Mountbellew
Carrownacregg West	272	Tiaquin	Killoscobe	Mountbellew
Carrownacreggaun	123	Dunkellin	Drumacoo	Gort
Carrownacroagh	316	Clare	Killursa	Tuam
Carrownafinnoge	220	Longford	Meelick	Portumna
Carrownafreevy	403	Killian	Killian	Mountbellew
Carrownagannive	353	Killian	Ballynakill	Mountbellew
Carrownagappul	1058	Killian	Ballynakill	Mountbellew
Carrownagarraun	93	Dunmore	Tuam	Tuam
Carrownagarry	372	Dunmore	Tuam	Tuam
Carrownageeha	241	Dunmore	Liskeevy	Tuam
Carrownaglogh	601	Ballymoe	Dunamon	Roscommon
Carrownaglogh	257	Athenry	Killimordaly	Loughrea
Carrownagower	183	Dunkellin	Lickerrig	Loughrea
Carrownagur	339	Ballymoe	Dunmore	Glennamaddy
Carrownaherick East	112	Clare	Belclare	Tuam
Carrownaherick West	111	Clare	Belclare	Tuam
Carrownakelly	40	Kilconnell	Ballymacward	Ballinasloe
Carrownakib	517	Clare	Killursa	Tuam
Carrownamaddra	774	Kiltartan	Kinvarradoorus	Gort
Carrownamona	135	Kiltartan	Ardrahan	Gort
Carrownamorrissy	202	Dunkellin	Kilconierin	Loughrea
Carrownaseer North	397	Dunmore	Dunmore	Tuam
Carrownaseer South	224	Dunmore	Dunmore	Tuam
Carrownavohanaun	131	Kiltartan	Kiltartan	Gort
Carrownderry	272	Ballymoe	Templetogher	Glennamaddy
Carrowndulla	156	Moycullen	Kilcummin	Oughterard
Carrownea	115	Kilconnell	Ballymacward	Ballinasloe
Carrownea Lower	129	Kilconnell	Ballymacward	Ballinasloe
Carrownea Upper	129	Kilconnell	Ballymacward	Ballinasloe
Carrowneany	235	Ballymoe	Templetogher	Glennamaddy
Carrownlisheen	1131	Aran	Inishmaan	Galway
Carrownrooaun	134	Clare	Annaghdown	Tuam
Carrowntanlis	249	Dunmore	Tuam	Tuam
Carrowntemple	1121	Aran	Inishmaan	Galway
Carrowntemple	104	Clare	Belclare	Tuam
Carrowntober	136	Leitrim	Abbeygormacan	Loughrea
Carrowntober (or Billymore)	303	Moycullen	Kilcummin	Oughterard
Carrowntober East	1049	Tiaquin	Kilkerrin	Glennamaddy
Carrowntober East	566	Athenry	Athenry	Galway
Carrowntober West	375	Tiaquin	Kilkerrin	Glennamaddy
Carrowntober West	200	Athenry	Athenry	Galway
Carrowntomush	204	Dunmore	Addergoole	Tuam
Carrowntootagh	182	Dunmore	Addergoole	Tuam
Carrowntryla	729	Ballymoe	Dunmore	Glennamaddy
Carrownurlaur	1583	Dunmore	Liskeevy	Tuam
Carrowpadeen East	324	Dunmore	Dunmore	Tuam
Carrowpadeen West	198	Dunmore	Dunmore	Tuam
Carrowpeter	45	Dunmore	Tuam	Tuam
Carrowreagh	416	Kilconnell	Fohanagh	Ballinasloe
Carrowreagh	258	Dunmore	Dunmore	Tuam
Carrowreagh	258	Longford	Killoran	Ballinasloe
Carrowreagh	169	Athenry	Killimordaly	Loughrea
Carrowreagh	139	Clare	Cummer	Tuam
Carrowreagh East	744	Tiaquin	Abbeyknockmoy	Tuam
Carrowreagh West	8	Clare	Abbeyknockmoy	Tuam
Carrowrevagh	266	Dunkellin	Kilconierin	Loughrea
Carrowrevagh Beg	97	Dunmore	Tuam	Tuam
Carrowrevagh More	222	Dunmore	Tuam	Tuam
Carrowroe	399	Leitrim	Kilcooly	Loughrea
Carrowroe	199	Ballymoe	Templetogher	Glennamaddy
Carrowroe	190	Leitrim	Ballynakill	Loughrea
Carrowroe East	144	Ballymoe	Dunmore	Tuam
Carrowroe North	2288	Moycullen	Kilcummin	Oughterard
Carrowroe North	129	Athenry	Lickerrig	Loughrea
Carrowroe South	995	Moycullen	Kilcummin	Oughterard
Carrowroe South	19	Dunkellin	Lickerrig	Loughrea
Carrowroe West	1081	Moycullen	Kilcummin	Oughterard
Carrowroe West	469	Ballymoe	Dunmore	Tuam
Carrowshanbally	295	Leitrim	Abbeygormacan	Loughrea
Carrowsteelagh	148	Loughrea	Killogilleen	Loughrea
Carta	961	Longford	Clonfert	Ballinasloe
Cartoor	165	Moycullen	Moycullen	Galway
Cartoorbeg	73	Ballynahinch	Omey	Clifden
Cartron	367	Dunmore	Tuam	Tuam
Cartron	277	Killian	Killeroran	Mountbellew
Cartron	250	Loughrea	Killogilleen	Loughrea
Cartron	241	Ballynahinch	Ballynakill	Clifden
Cartron	236	Dunkellin	Killeenavarra	Gort
Cartron	210	Leitrim	Duniry	Loughrea
Cartron	157	Dunkellin	Drumacoo	Gort
Cartron	145	Dunmore	Addergoole	Tuam
Cartron	137	Clare	Annaghdown	Tuam
Cartron	133	Ballymoe	Kilbegnet	Roscommon
Cartron	129	Kiltartan	Kinvarradoorus	Gort
Cartron	124	Clare	Belclare	Tuam
Cartron	119	Dunkellin	Oranmore	Galway
Cartron	114	Clonmacnowen	Killallaghtan	Ballinasloe
Cartron	111	Moycullen	Killannin	Galway
Cartron	91	Tiaquin	Monivea	Tuam
Cartron	85	Dunmore	Kilconla	Tuam
Cartron	73	Leitrim	Clonrush	Scarriff
Cartron	55	Kilconnell	Killosolan	Mountbellew
Cartron	20	Kilconnell	Grange	Loughrea
Cartron East	36	Ballymoe	Templetogher	Glennamaddy
Cartron South	71	Leitrim	Ballynakill	Loughrea
Cartron West	44	Ballymoe	Templetogher	Glennamaddy
Cartrondoogan	338	Kilconnell	Fohanagh	Mountbellew
Cartrondoogan	189	Kilconnell	Kilconnell	Ballinasloe
Cartronearl	121	Killian	Killeroran	Mountbellew
Cartronlahan	1013	Moycullen	Kilcummin	Galway
Cartronroe	362	Dunmore	Tuam	Tuam
Cartronsheela	98	Kilconnell	Aughrim	Ballinasloe
Cartrontrellick	188	Kiltartan	Kinvarradoorus	Gort
Cashel	1281	Ballynahinch	Moyrus	Clifden
Cashel	594	Tiaquin	Boyounagh	Glennamaddy
Cashla	292	Clare	Athenry	Galway
Cashla	282	Clare	Lackagh	Galway
Cashlaundarragh	255	Tiaquin	Monivea	Tuam
Cashleen	350	Ballynahinch	Ballynakill	Clifden
Castle	479	Ballymoe	Dunmore	Glennamaddy
Castle Ellen	379	Athenry	Athenry	Galway
Castle Ffrench	443	Kilconnell	Killosolan	Mountbellew
Castle Ffrench East	369	Killian	Ahascragh	Mountbellew
Castle Ffrench West	336	Kilconnell	Ahascragh	Mountbellew
Castle Island	8	Kiltartan	Beagh	Gort
Castlebellew	300	Tiaquin	Moylough	Mountbellew
Castlebin East	308	Kilconnell	Killaan	Ballinasloe
Castlebin North	291	Kilconnell	Killaan	Ballinasloe
Castlebin South	147	Kilconnell	Killaan	Ballinasloe
**Castleblakeney**	Town	Tiaquin	Killosolan	Mountbellew
Castleblakeney	105	Tiaquin	Killosolan	Mountbellew
Castleboy	456	Loughrea	Killinan	Loughrea
Castlecreevy	405	Clare	Annaghdown	Galway
Castledaly	228	Loughrea	Ardrahan	Gort
Castlefarm	192	Dunmore	Dunmore	Tuam
Castlefield	284	Ballymoe	Templetogher	Glennamaddy
Castlegar	799	Killian	Ballynakill	Mountbellew
Castlegar	528	Galway	St. Nicholas	Galway
Castlegar	289	Dunkellin	Killeely	Gort
Castlegar East	927	Killian	Ahascragh	Ballinasloe
Castlegar West	311	Clonmacnowen	Ahascragh	Ballinasloe
Castlegrove East	261	Dunmore	Kilbennan	Tuam
Castlegrove West	357	Dunmore	Kilbennan	Tuam
Castlehacket	902	Clare	Killower	Tuam
Castlekelly (or Aghrane)	751	Killian	Athleague	Mountbellew
Castlekelly (or Aghrane)	564	Killian	Killeroran	Mountbellew
Castlelambert	588	Clare	Athenry	Galway
Castlemoyle	198	Dunmore	Killererin	Tuam
Castlenancy	363	Leitrim	Abbeygormacan	Loughrea
Castlepark	50	Loughrea	Isertkelly	Loughrea
Castlequarter	343	Kiltartan	Kilmacduagh	Gort
Castlequarter	107	Clare	Annaghdown	Galway
Castletaylor North	267	Dunkellin	Ardrahan	Gort
Castletaylor South	431	Dunkellin	Ardrahan	Gort
Castletogher	429	Ballymoe	Templetogher	Glennamaddy
Castletown	381	Tiaquin	Kilkerrin	Glennamaddy
Castletown	253	Kiltartan	Kiltartan	Gort
Castletown	140	Dunmore	Tuam	Tuam
Castletown	123	Longford	Abbeygormacan	Ballinasloe
Castleturvin	388	Athenry	Athenry	Loughrea
Cave	590	Kilconnell	Ballymacward	Ballinasloe
Cave	199	Clare	Killower	Tuam
Chapel Island	10	Ballynahinch	Ballindoon	Clifden
Chapelfield	20	Tiaquin	Abbeyknockmoy	Tuam
Chapelpark	245	Clonmacnowen	Clontuskert	Ballinasloe
Charlestown (or Pollnamucka)	88	Killian	Killeroran	Mountbellew
Chelsea	206	Kilconnell	Killallaghtan	Ballinasloe
Church Island	1	Longford	Lickmolassy	Portumna
Churchfield Lower	373	Ross	Ballinrobe	Ballinrobe
Churchfield Upper	355	Ross	Ballinrobe	Ballinrobe
Claddagh East	295	Ballymoe	Clonbern	Tuam
Claddagh West	352	Ballymoe	Clonbern	Tuam
Claddaghduff	416	Ballynahinch	Omey	Clifden
Claggan	412	Ross	Cong	Oughterard
Claggernagh East	237	Longford	Lickmolassy	Portumna
Claggernagh West	28	Longford	Lickmolassy	Portumna
Clamperpark	110	Athenry	Athenry	Loughrea
Clarary	152	Longford	Killimorbologue	Portumna
Clare	78	Moycullen	Kilcummin	Oughterard
Claregalway	585	Clare	Claregalway	Galway
Claremadden	576	Longford	Kilquain	Portumna
Claremount	569	Moycullen	Kilcummin	Oughterard
Claretuam	379	Clare	Belclare	Tuam
**Clarinbridge**	Town	Dunkellin	Stradbally	Galway
Clashaganny	480	Dunmore	Liskeevy	Tuam
Clashaganny	179	Athenry	Kiltullagh	Loughrea
Clashard	203	Tiaquin	Abbeyknockmoy	Tuam
Classaghroe	448	Ballymoe	Boyounagh	Glennamaddy
Claureen	71	Dunmore	Kilbennan	Tuam
Cleaghmore	138	Clonmacnowen	Kilcloony	Ballinasloe
Cleenillaun	9	Ross	Cong	Oughterard
Cleggan	889	Ballynahinch	Ballynakill	Clifden
Clerhaun	593	Clare	Killursa	Tuam
**Clifden**	Town	Ballynahinch	Omey	Clifden
Clifden	310	Ballynahinch	Omey	Clifden
Clifden Demesne	206	Ballynahinch	Omey	Clifden
Clogh	1638	Tiaquin	Clonkeen	Loughrea
Clogh North	198	Clare	Cummer	Tuam
Clogh South	243	Clare	Cummer	Tuam
Cloghagalla Eighter	350	Clonmacnowen	Aughrim	Ballinasloe
Cloghagalla Oughter	332	Clonmacnowen	Aughrim	Ballinasloe
Cloghalahard	300	Dunkellin	Stradbally	Galway
Cloghanower	404	Clare	Killeany	Tuam
Clogharevaun	286	Athenry	Kiltullagh	Loughrea
Clogharoasty	144	Leitrim	Kilmeen	Loughrea
Cloghastookeen	169	Dunkellin	Kilconickny	Loughrea
Cloghatanna	124	Longford	Lickmolassy	Portumna
Cloghatisky	33	Galway	Rahoon	Galway
Cloghaun	976	Loughrea	Killinan	Loughrea
Cloghaun	96	Clare	Lackagh	Galway
Cloghaun	11	Clare	Claregalway	Galway
Cloghaunard	208	Ballynahinch	Omey	Clifden
Cloghballymore	223	Dunkellin	Killeenavarra	Gort
Cloghboley	397	Dunkellin	Killeenavarra	Gort
Cloghbrack	65	Killian	Killian	Mountbellew
Cloghbrack	64	Leitrim	Kilmeen	Loughrea
Cloghbrack and Budellagh	166	Longford	Donanaghta	Portumna
Cloghbrack Lower	642	Ross	Ross	Oughterard
Cloghbrack Middle	110	Ross	Ross	Oughterard
Cloghbrack Upper	1041	Ross	Ross	Oughterard
Clogher	174	Ross	Cong	Oughterard
Clogherboy	587	Clare	Killererin	Tuam
Cloghermorre	1958	Moycullen	Kilcummin	Oughterard
Cloghernagun	2324	Moycullen	Killannin	Galway
Cloghernalaura	716	Moycullen	Killannin	Galway
Cloghmore North	1091	Moycullen	Killannin	Galway
Cloghmore South	284	Moycullen	Killannin	Galway
Cloghnakeava	184	Kiltartan	Beagh	Gort
Cloghnakeava	75	Kiltartan	Kilbeacanty	Gort
Cloghscoltia	204	Galway	Rahoon	Galway
Cloghvoley	900	Leitrim	Ballynakill	Loughrea
Clonbern	937	Ballymoe	Clonbern	Tuam
Clonbrock	97	Kilconnell	Ahascragh	Mountbellew
Clonbrock Demesne	1761	Kilconnell	Fohanagh	Mountbellew
Clonco	683	Leitrim	Ballynakill	Loughrea
Clonfert (Buston)	1605	Longford	Clonfert	Ballinasloe
Clonfert (Seymour) North	171	Longford	Clonfert	Ballinasloe
Clonfert (Seymour) South	16	Longford	Clonfert	Ballinasloe
Clonfert Demesne	526	Longford	Clonfert	Ballinasloe
Clonfertdemesne Bog	270	Longford	Clonfert	Ballinasloe
Clonkeenkerrill	905	Tiaquin	Clonkeen	Loughrea
Clonrush	176	Leitrim	Clonrush	Scarriff
Cloocah	765	Kilconnell	Killimordaly	Loughrea
Cloocah	364	Ballymoe	Ballynakill	Glennamaddy
Clookeen Oughter	453	Tiaquin	Kilkerrin	Glennamaddy
Cloomore	889	Clare	Tuam	Tuam
Cloon	440	Dunkellin	Claregalway	Galway
Cloon	353	Kiltartan	Kilbeacanty	Gort
Cloon	342	Ballynahinch	Ballynakill	Clifden
Cloon	94	Ballynahinch	Omey	Clifden
Cloonacalleen	158	Kilconnell	Kilconnell	Ballinasloe
Cloonacalleen	118	Kilconnell	Killaan	Ballinasloe
Cloonacastle	227	Leitrim	Duniry	Portumna
Cloonacauneen	449	Galway	Oranmore	Galway
Cloonacauneen	29	Dunkellin	Claregalway	Galway
Cloonadarragh	328	Ballymoe	Drumatemple	Glennamaddy
Cloonagawnagh	71	Ballymoe	Clonbern	Tuam
Cloonagh	566	Ballymoe	Dunmore	Glennamaddy
Cloonagh	449	Dunmore	Dunmore	Tuam
Cloonagh	45	Clare	Annaghdown	Tuam
Cloonaghgarve	191	Dunmore	Addergoole	Tuam
Cloonaghmore	45	Longford	Kilquain	Portumna
Cloonagrower	33	Galway	Rahoon	Galway
Cloonahinch	215	Kilconnell	Killaan	Ballinasloe
Cloonameragaun	101	Kilconnell	Aughrim	Ballinasloe
Cloonamirran	397	Leitrim	Inishcaltra	Scarriff
Cloonanearla	137	Kiltartan	Kiltartan	Gort
Cloonarkan	356	Ballymoe	Clonbern	Tuam
Cloonascarberry (Cheevers)	190	Killian	Killian	Mountbellew
Cloonascarberry North	95	Killian	Killian	Mountbellew
Cloonascarberry South	206	Killian	Killian	Mountbellew
Cloonascragh	1020	Longford	Clontuskert	Ballinasloe
Cloonascragh	870	Clare	Tuam	Tuam
Cloonascragh	405	Tiaquin	Moylough	Mountbellew
Cloonascragh	224	Dunmore	Kilbennan	Tuam
Cloonatleva Lower	405	Kilconnell	Fohanagh	Mountbellew
Cloonatleva Upper	61	Kilconnell	Fohanagh	Mountbellew
Cloonatloukaun	113	Kilconnell	Killaan	Ballinasloe
Cloonavihony	453	Killian	Killian	Mountbellew
Cloonbanniv	342	Killian	Ahascragh	Ballinasloe
Cloonbar	858	Dunmore	Kilconla	Tuam
Cloonbeg	330	Ballynahinch	Moyrus	Clifden
Cloonbenes	420	Kilconnell	Grange	Loughrea
Cloonberg	32	Kiltartan	Kilbeacanty	Gort
Cloonboo	425	Clare	Annaghdown	Galway
Cloonboo Beg	134	Ballymoe	Dunmore	Glennamaddy
Cloonbrone	280	Ross	Cong	Oughterard
Cloonbrusk	321	Kilconnell	Monivea	Loughrea
Cloonbrusk	160	Dunmore	Addergoole	Tuam
Cloonbur	194	Ross	Ross	Oughterard
Clooncallaga	571	Tiaquin	Moylough	Mountbellew
Clooncallis	264	Kilconnell	Killallaghtan	Ballinasloe
Clooncallis	30	Kilconnell	Killaan	Ballinasloe
Clooncannon	277	Killian	Athleague	Mountbellew
Clooncannon (Dillon)	284	Clonmacnowen	Ahascragh	Mountbellew
Clooncannon (Kelly)	392	Clonmacnowen	Ahascragh	Mountbellew
Clooncon East	682	Ballymoe	Boyounagh	Glennamaddy
Clooncon West	744	Ballymoe	Boyounagh	Glennamaddy
Clooncona	256	Longford	Killimorbologue	Portumna
Cloonconabeg	55	Longford	Killimorbologue	Portumna
Cloonconore	468	Tiaquin	Kilkerrin	Glennamaddy
Cloonconra	233	Longford	Clonfert	Ballinasloe
Cloonconra	228	Dunmore	Killererin	Tuam
Clooncree	79	Ballynahinch	Ballynakill	Clifden
Clooncullaun	691	Ballymoe	Ballynakill	Glennamaddy
Clooncunny	357	Ballymoe	Ballynakill	Glennamaddy
Clooncurreen	202	Tiaquin	Moylough	Mountbellew
Cloondadauv	151	Leitrim	Ballynakill	Portumna
Cloondahamper (Blake)	471	Ballymoe	Killererin	Tuam
Cloondahamper(Brown)	202	Ballymoe	Killererin	Tuam
Cloondarone	557	Clare	Tuam	Tuam
Cloondayle Beg	188	Ballymoe	Boyounagh	Glennamaddy
Cloondergan	709	Dunmore	Dunmore	Tuam
Cloondine	92	Kiltartan	Kilbeacanty	Gort
Cloondoyle More	88	Ballymoe	Boyounagh	Glennamaddy
Cloondroon	357	Dunmore	Addergoole	Tuam
Cloonederowen	100	Ballynahinch	Ballynakill	Clifden
Cloonee	287	Clare	Kilkilvery	Tuam
Cloonee	249	Ballymoe	Drumatemple	Glennamaddy
Clooneen	142	Clare	Killeany	Tuam
Clooneen	65	Dunmore	Dunmore	Tuam
Clooneen	44	Leitrim	Ballynakill	Loughrea
Clooneen	17	Loughrea	Kilthomas	Gort
Cloonfaghna	587	Ballymoe	Ballynakill	Glennamaddy
Cloonfane	492	Dunmore	Dunmore	Tuam
Cloonfinnoge	99	Killian	Killian	Mountbellew
Cloonfush	398	Clare	Tuam	Tuam
Cloongawna	199	Tiaquin	Ballymacward	Ballinasloe
Clooniff	1131	Moycullen	Moycullen	Galway
Cloonigmy	1024	Clonmacnowen	Kilgerrill	Ballinasloe
Clooninagh	409	Clare	Cummer	Tuam
Cloonineen	323	Longford	Kiltormer	Ballinasloe
Cloonisle	904	Ballynahinch	Moyrus	Clifden
Cloonkea	207	Longford	Clonfert	Ballinasloe
Cloonkeely	108	Clare	Killursa	Tuam
Cloonkeen	971	Dunmore	Dunmore	Tuam
Cloonkeen	525	Tiaquin	Moylough	Tuam
Cloonkeen	241	Tiaquin	Boyounagh	Glennamaddy
Cloonkeen (Davies)	93	Killian	Killian	Mountbellew
Cloonkeen (Ffrench)	166	Killian	Killian	Mountbellew
Cloonkeen (Kelly)	122	Killian	Killian	Mountbellew
Cloonkeen (Netterrillie)	95	Killian	Killian	Mountbellew
Cloonkeen (Waldron)	206	Tiaquin	Kilkerrin	Glennamaddy
Cloonkeen Eighter	229	Tiaquin	Kilkerrin	Glennamaddy
Cloonkeen North	553	Clare	Cummer	Tuam
Cloonkeen South	127	Clare	Cummer	Tuam
Cloonkeen Wast	217	Clonmacnowen	Killallaghtan	Ballinasloe
Cloonkeen West	189	Clonmacnowen	Killallaghtan	Ballinasloe
Cloonkeenbeg	413	Tiaquin	Monivea	Loughrea
Cloonkeenclare	293	Tiaquin	Kilkerrin	Glennamaddy
Cloonkeenleananode	348	Tiaquin	Kilkerrin	Glennamaddy
Cloonkeenmore North	471	Tiaquin	Monivea	Loughrea
Cloonkeenmore South	502	Kilconnell	Monivea	Loughrea
Cloonkeennagran	404	Tiaquin	Kilkerrin	Glennamaddy
Cloonlahan (Eyre)	302	Longford	Killoran	Ballinasloe
Cloonlahan (Geoghegan)	173	Longford	Killoran	Ballinasloe
Cloonlara North	215	Ballymoe	Boyounagh	Glennamaddy
Cloonlara South	508	Ballymoe	Boyounagh	Glennamaddy
Cloonlee	551	Leitrim	Duniry	Loughrea
Cloonleenaun	220	Clare	Annaghdown	Galway
Cloonlooaun	832	Ballynahinch	Ballynakill	Clifden
Cloonlusk	339	Clare	Killererin	Tuam
Cloonlyon	1078	Killian	Killeroran	Mountbellew
Cloonmaghaura	706	Ballymoe	Templetogher	Glennamaddy
Cloonmain	360	Leitrim	Killoran	Loughrea
Cloonminda	293	Ballymoe	Boyounagh	Glennamaddy
Cloonmohaun	83	Leitrim	Clonrush	Scarriff
Cloonmore	959	Ballymoe	Dunmore	Glennamaddy
Cloonmore	331	Moycullen	Killannin	Oughterard
Cloonmore	287	Clare	Belclare	Tuam
Cloonmorris	124	Kiltartan	Kilbeacanty	Gort
Cloonmoylan	1141	Leitrim	Ballynakill	Portumna
Cloonmoylan	383	Leitrim	Tynagh	Portumna
Cloonmoyle	192	Dunmore	Tuam	Tuam
Cloonmweelaun	752	Tiaquin	Moylough	Mountbellew
Cloonmweelaun	370	Dunmore	Kilconla	Tuam
Cloonnabinnia	440	Moycullen	Moycullen	Galway
Cloonnabricka	404	Killian	Killeroran	Mountbellew
Cloonnacartan	1569	Ballynahinch	Moyrus	Clifden
Cloonnacat	423	Ballymoe	Clonbern	Glennamaddy
Cloonnacorra	126	Dunmore	Liskeevy	Tuam
Cloonnacross	245	Ballymoe	Boyounagh	Glennamaddy
Cloonnacross	154	Dunmore	Addergoole	Tuam
Cloonnacusha	340	Longford	Tynagh	Portumna
Cloonnafunshin	225	Kiltartan	Kilmacduagh	Gort
Cloonnagark	99	Longford	Tynagh	Portumna
Cloonnaglasha	1027	Dunmore	Kilconla	Tuam
Cloonnahaha	339	Kiltartan	Beagh	Gort
Cloonnamarve	68	Ross	Cong	Oughterard
Cloonnamaskry	283	Longford	Kilquain	Portumna
Cloonnasee	478	Kiltartan	Kinvarradoorus	Gort
Cloonnavaddoge	596	Clare	Athenry	Galway
Cloonnavarnoge	158	Clare	Kilkilvery	Tuam
Cloononaghaun	254	Clare	Killursa	Tuam
Cloonoo East	220	Loughrea	Kilconickny	Loughrea
Cloonoo West	102	Loughrea	Kilconickny	Loughrea
Cloonoolia North	130	Leitrim	Clonrush	Scarriff
Cloonoolia South	287	Leitrim	Clonrush	Scarriff
Cloonoolish	316	Longford	Killimorbologue	Portumna
Cloonoon	375	Leitrim	Ballynakill	Portumna
Cloonoran	263	Tiaquin	Moylough	Mountbellew
Cloonoranoughter	473	Tiaquin	Killoscobe	Mountbellew
Cloonpee	114	Tiaquin	Killosolan	Mountbellew
Cloonprask	188	Longford	Duniry	Loughrea
Cloonrane	476	Dunmore	Addergoole	Tuam
Cloonreleagh (Bellew)	360	Killian	Ballynakill	Mountbellew
Cloonreleagh East	9	Killian	Ballynakill	Mountbellew
Cloonreleagh West	126	Killian	Ballynakill	Mountbellew
Cloonriddia	179	Clare	Killererin	Tuam
Cloonruff	699	Killian	Athleague	Mountbellew
Cloonruff	255	Ballymoe	Kilcroan	Glennamaddy
Cloonshease (Daty)	76	Longford	Clonfert	Ballinasloe
Cloonshease (Persse)	296	Longford	Clonfert	Ballinasloe
Cloonshee	75	Killian	Ahascragh	Mountbellew
Cloonshee (Dillon)	209	Killian	Ahascragh	Mountbellew
Cloonshee (Kelly)	83	Killian	Ahascragh	Mountbellew
Cloonshee (Rochfort)	518	Killian	Ahascragh	Mountbellew
Cloonshee (Trench)	226	Killian	Ahascragh	Mountbellew
Cloonsheecahill	710	Kilconnell	Killimordaly	Loughrea
Cloonsheen	581	Dunmore	Kilconla	Tuam
Cloonshivna	274	Killian	Killian	Mountbellew
Cloonshivna (Kelly)	283	Killian	Killian	Mountbellew
Cloonteen	775	Dunmore	Kilconla	Tuam
Cloonteen	54	Kiltartan	Kilmacduagh	Gort
Cloontooa	484	Clare	Tuam	Tuam
Cloontyconnaught	165	Leitrim	Inishcaltra	Scarriff
Cloonyconaum	124	Kilconnell	Grange	Loughrea
Cloonykeevan	147	Longford	Clonfert	Ballinasloe
Cloonymorris	110	Kilconnell	Killaan	Ballinasloe
Cloosh	252	Kiltartan	Kinvarradoorus	Gort
Clooshgereen	913	Moycullen	Kilcummin	Oughterard
Cloran	431	Athenry	Athenry	Loughrea
Cloverfield	73	Tiaquin	Killoscobe	Mountbellew
Cloverpark	22	Kilconnell	Killaan	Ballinasloe
Cluid	271	Ballymoe	Dunmore	Glennamaddy
Cluidrevagh	678	Clare	Annaghdown	Tuam
Clybaun	221	Galway	Rahoon	Galway
Clydagh	306	Moycullen	Moycullen	Galway
Clydagh	299	Clare	Cargin	Tuam
Clydagh (or Staunton's Island)	2	Clare	Cargin	Tuam
Clynagh	837	Moycullen	Killannin	Oughterard
Clynagh Island	102	Moycullen	Kilcummin	Oughterard
Coalpits	386	Killian	Athleague	Mountbellew
Coarsefield	267	Galway	Oranmore	Galway
Coarsepark (or Parkgarve)	118	Clare	Killursa	Tuam
Coarseparks	152	Leitrim	Ballynakill	Loughrea
Cockstown	85	Kiltartan	Ardrahan	Gort
Cockstown West	100	Kiltartan	Ardrahan	Gort
Cogaula	618	Ballymoe	Dunmore	Glennamaddy
Coldwood (or Foorkill)	602	Dunkellin	Athenry	Galway
Colesgrove	158	Dunkellin	Killora	Loughrea
Colmanstown	1456	Tiaquin	Clonkeen	Loughrea
Colmanstown	79	Tiaquin	Monivea	Loughrea
Colt Island	4	Ballynahinch	Moyrus	Clifden
Common	77	Clare	Kilmoylan	Tuam
Common	36	Clare	Tuam	Tuam
Common	25	Ballymoe	Boyounagh	Glennamaddy
Common (or Turloughnaroyey)	93	Clare	Belclare	Tuam
Commons	367	Loughrea	Kilteskill	Loughrea
Commons	191	Loughrea	Killeenadeema	Loughrea
Commons East	430	Leitrim	Ballynakill	Loughrea
Commons West	380	Leitrim	Ballynakill	Loughrea
Conagher	813	Dunmore	Dunmore	Tuam
Conicar	125	Leitrim	Ballynakill	Portumna
Conicar	117	Dunkellin	Kilconickny	Loughrea
Connet	68	Leitrim	Tynagh	Portumna
Conor's Island	1	Ross	Cong	Oughterard
Conorspark	49	Longford	Killimorbologue	Portumna
Cool	187	Clonmacnowen	Ahascragh	Ballinasloe
Coolacloy	129	Ballynahinch	Omey	Clifden
Coolacurn North	36	Longford	Clonfert	Ballinasloe
Coolacurn South	101	Longford	Clonfert	Ballinasloe
Cooladooaun	151	Dunmore	Addergoole	Tuam
Coolagarraun	57	Longford	Kiltormer	Ballinasloe
Coolagh	365	Galway	St. Nicholas	Galway
Coolagh	333	Dunkellin	Oranmore	Galway
Coolagh	157	Longford	Abbeygormacan	Ballinasloe
Coolagh	67	Moycullen	Moycullen	Galway
Coolanillaun	312	Galway	Oranmore	Galway
Coolaran	512	Clare	Athenry	Galway
Coolaspaddaun	166	Killian	Athleague	Mountbellew
Coolbaun	87	Longford	Killimorbologue	Portumna
Coolbaun West	79	Longford	Killimorbologue	Portumna
Coolbeg	215	Longford	Clontuskert	Ballinasloe
Coolcarta East	647	Longford	Clonfert	Ballinasloe
Coolcarta West	684	Longford	Clonfert	Ballinasloe
Cooldorragha	198	Clare	Killererin	Tuam
Cooldorragha	166	Longford	Lickmolassy	Portumna
Coole Demesne	1355	Kiltartan	Kiltartan	Gort
Cooleeny	340	Leitrim	Kilreekill	Loughrea
Cooleeny East	181	Longford	Kiltormer	Ballinasloe
Cooleeny West	104	Longford	Kiltormer	Ballinasloe
Coolfin	451	Leitrim	Ballynakill	Portumna
Coolfin	133	Kiltartan	Ardrahan	Gort
Coolfowerbeg	113	Clare	Killererin	Tuam
Coolin	427	Ross	Ross	Oughterard
Coollicknalea	313	Dunmore	Addergoole	Tuam
Coolnageeragh	204	Longford	Lickmolassy	Portumna
Cooloo	984	Tiaquin	Moylough	Mountbellew
Cooloo Mountain	380	Tiaquin	Moylough	Mountbellew
Cooloola	361	Kilconnell	Aughrim	Ballinasloe
Cooloorta	73	Tiaquin	Abbeyknockmoy	Tuam
Coolpark	195	Dunmore	Tuam	Tuam
Coolpowra	362	Longford	Lickmolassy	Portumna
Coolraugh	252	Dunkellin	Lickerrig	Loughrea
Coolrevagh	293	Clare	Killererin	Tuam
Coolroghaun	110	Ballymoe	Kilbegnet	Roscommon
Coolsraha	172	Dunkellin	Ballynacourty	Galway
Coolsraha	131	Dunkellin	Stradbally	Galway
Cooltymurraghy	429	Kilconnell	Aughrim	Ballinasloe
Cooltymurraghy	327	Clonmacnowen	Killallaghtan	Ballinasloe
Coolwoneen	98	Tiaquin	Moylough	Mountbellew
Cooracurkia	314	Leitrim	Abbeygormacan	Loughrea
Coorbaun	81	Loughrea	Kilconickny	Loughrea
Coorinch	30	Longford	Clonfert	Ballinasloe
Coorinch	16	Longford	Meelick	Portumna
Coos North	1200	Leitrim	Ballynakill	Portumna
Coos South	973	Leitrim	Ballynakill	Portumna
Coosaun	71	Moycullen	Kilcummin	Oughterard
Coothagh	95	Ballymoe	Templetogher	Glennamaddy
Coppanagh	2275	Loughrea	Killeenadeema	Loughrea
Coppanagh	177	Kilconnell	Killaan	Ballinasloe
Corandoo	160	Tiaquin	Moylough	Tuam
Corbally	222	Clare	Annaghdown	Galway
Corbally	63	Moycullen	Moycullen	Galway
Corbally (Hogan)	279	Longford	Abbeygormacan	Ballinasloe
Corbally Beg	112	Longford	Abbeygormacan	Ballinasloe
Corbally More	572	Longford	Abbeygormacan	Ballinasloe
Corbally North	795	Clare	Kilmoylan	Tuam
Corbally North	169	Clare	Kilmoylan	Tuam
Corballymore and Camgort	140	Longford	Donanaghta	Portumna
Corbaun	271	Leitrim	Kilcooly	Loughrea
Corboley (Lynch)	247	Galway	Rahoon	Galway
Corboley (Morgan)	660	Galway	Rahoon	Galway
Corcullen	272	Galway	Rahoon	Galway
Corcullen	10	Moycullen	Moycullen	Galway
Cordarragh	413	Clare	Killursa	Tuam
Corgarve	120	Ballymoe	Ballynakill	Glennamaddy
Corgerry Eighter	360	Tiaquin	Killoscobe	Mountbellew
Corgerry Oughter	413	Tiaquin	Killoscobe	Mountbellew
Corillaun	230	Clare	Donaghpatrick	Tuam
Corker	460	Kiltartan	Kiltartan	Gort
Corlackan	376	Ballymoe	Kilbegnet	Glennamaddy
Corlackan	108	Ballymoe	Kilcroan	Glennamaddy
Corliskea	450	Ballymoe	Drumatemple	Glennamaddy
Cormacuagh East	215	Tiaquin	Monivea	Loughrea
Cormacuagh West	411	Tiaquin	Monivea	Loughrea
Cormeelick North	105	Dunmore	Addergoole	Tuam
Cormeelick South	87	Dunmore	Addergoole	Tuam
Cormick	110	Longford	Duniry	Loughrea
Cormick	107	Longford	Abbeygormacan	Ballinasloe
Cornacartan	209	Dunmore	Killererin	Tuam
Cornacask (or Easterfield)	484	Killian	Athleague	Mountbellew
Cornacoyntia	131	Ballymoe	Boyounagh	Glennamaddy
Cornadrum	65	Killian	Killeroran	Mountbellew
Cornaminaun	53	Ballymoe	Clonbern	Glennamaddy
Cornamona	333	Ross	Cong	Oughterard
**Cornamucklagh**	Town	Ballymoe	Kilcroan	Glennamaddy
Cornamucklagh	401	Clonmacnowen	Ahascragh	Ballinasloe
Cornamucklagh	376	Ballymoe	Kilcroan	Glennamaddy
Cornanaff	195	Ballymoe	Templetogher	Glennamaddy
Cornananta Beg	267	Killian	Killeroran	Mountbellew
Cornananta More	227	Killian	Killeroran	Mountbellew
Cornarona	1568	Moycullen	Killannin	Galway
Cornaveagh	655	Ballymoe	Dunamon	Roscommon
Corr	476	Longford	Kilmalinoge	Portumna
Corrabaun	250	Kilconnell	Grange	Loughrea
Corrabaun	226	Killian	Killeroran	Mountbellew
Corrabaun	94	Clonmacnowen	Clontuskert	Ballinasloe
Corrabaun (or Nurserypark)	48	Tiaquin	Monivea	Tuam
Corracullin	362	Tiaquin	Kilkerrin	Glennamaddy
Corrafaireen	516	Tiaquin	Monivea	Tuam
Corralea	217	Tiaquin	Killererin	Tuam
Corralea	185	Ballymoe	Tuam	Tuam
Corralea	171	Tiaquin	Monivea	Tuam
Corralea West	1	Clare	Tuam	Tuam
Corralough	529	Ballymoe	Templetogher	Glennamaddy
Corralough South	74	Ballymoe	Templetogher	Glennamaddy
Corramaeeagh	591	Tiaquin	Kilkerrin	Glennamaddy
Corrandrum	432	Clare	Kilmoylan	Tuam
Corrandrum	107	Clare	Annaghdown	Tuam
Corrandulla	384	Clare	Annaghdown	Galway
Corraneena	418	Kilconnell	Kilconnell	Ballinasloe
Corranellistrum	234	Moycullen	Kilcummin	Oughterard
Corrantarramud	828	Tiaquin	Monivea	Loughrea
Corrcollia	297	Killian	Taghboy	Mountbellew
Corrofin	781	Clare	Cummer	Tuam
Corrspark	191	Ballymoe	Ballynakill	Glennamaddy
Corry	133	Longford	Killimorbologue	Portumna
Corry	115	Ballymoe	Tuam	Tuam
Corskeagh (Daly)	736	Tiaquin	Ballymacward	Loughrea
Corskeagh (Trench)	334	Tiaquin	Ballymacward	Ballinasloe
Corskeagh Beg	117	Dunmore	Killererin	Tuam
Corskeagh More	253	Dunmore	Killererin	Tuam
Cosmona	399	Loughrea	Loughrea	Loughrea
Cossaun	269	Clare	Athenry	Galway
Cossaunaclamper	74	Leitrim	Kilteskill	Loughrea
Costello's Island	4	Longford	Clonfert	Ballinasloe
Costellospark	69	Tiaquin	Monivea	Tuam
Coteenty	358	Clare	Annaghdown	Galway
Cottage	164	Dunkellin	Ballynacourty	Galway
Cottage	148	Clare	Killererin	Tuam
Couravoughill	398	Ballynahinch	Omey	Clifden
Courhoor	531	Ballynahinch	Omey	Clifden
Cournageeha	91	Kiltartan	Kilbeacanty	Gort
Course	279	Tiaquin	Killosolan	Mountbellew
Cow Island	3	Moycullen	Killannin	Oughterard
Coxtown	309	Longford	Kiltormer	Ballinasloe
Craghalan Big	14	Longford	Clonfert	Ballinasloe
Craghalan Little	1	Longford	Clonfert	Ballinasloe
Crane Island	2	Leitrim	Clonrush	Scarriff
Crannagh	546	Kiltartan	Kilmacduagh	Gort
Crannagh	407	Kiltartan	Ardrahan	Gort
Crannagh	252	Leitrim	Tynagh	Portumna
Crannagh	104	Tiaquin	Killosolan	Mountbellew
Crappagh	117	Moycullen	Kilcummin	Oughterard
**Craughwell**	Town	Dunkellin	Killora	Loughrea
Craughwell	767	Longford	Kiltormer	Ballinasloe
Craughwell	149	Dunkellin	Killora	Loughrea
Creelogh	444	Moycullen	Killannin	Oughterard
Creeraun	244	Tiaquin	Ballymacward	Loughrea
Creevagh	168	Kilconnell	Killimordaly	Loughrea
Creevaghbaun	150	Dunmore	Killererin	Tuam
Creeveroe (Davies)	127	Killian	Killian	Mountbellew
Creeveroe (Ffrench)	272	Killian	Killian	Mountbellew
Cregaclare Demesne	531	Dunkellin	Ardrahan	Gort
Cregballymore	150	Dunkellin	Killeenavarra	Gort
Cregboy	676	Dunkellin	Claregalway	Galway
Cregboy	335	Kiltartan	Beagh	Gort
Cregboy	84	Kiltartan	Kinvarradoorus	Gort
Cregcarragh	251	Clare	Lackagh	Galway
Cregdotia	45	Ross	Cong	Oughterard
Cregduff	640	Clare	Annaghdown	Galway
Cregg	1304	Ballynahinch	Omey	Clifden
Cregg	400	Moycullen	Kilcummin	Oughterard
Cregg	381	Leitrim	Clonrush	Scarriff
Cregg	234	Clare	Annaghdown	Galway
Cregg	162	Leitrim	Ballynakill	Loughrea
Cregg	57	Dunkellin	Kilconierin	Loughrea
Cregg Demesne	318	Kiltartan	Beagh	Gort
Cregganagrogy (or St. Brendan's)	530	Killian	Killian	Mountbellew
Creggananta	65	Dunkellin	Killeeneen	Gort
Cregganna Beg	324	Dunkellin	Ballynacourty	Galway
Cregganna More	328	Dunkellin	Ballynacourty	Galway
Cregganore	207	Loughrea	Killinan	Loughrea
Creggaree	90	Ross	Cong	Oughterard
Creggaturlough	122	Dunkellin	Kilconierin	Loughrea
Creggaun	764	Clonmacnowen	Ahascragh	Ballinasloe
Creggaun	387	Tiaquin	Kilkerrin	Glennamaddy
Creggaun	318	Tiaquin	Ballymacward	Mountbellew
Creggaun	112	Dunkellin	Killora	Loughrea
Creggaun	70	Killian	Ahascragh	Mountbellew
Creggaun (Dillon)	40	Killian	Ahascragh	Mountbellew
Creggaun (Machugh)	72	Killian	Ahascragh	Mountbellew
Creggaunnagroagh	158	Tiaquin	Killosolan	Mountbellew
Creggauns	226	Ballymoe	Kilbegnet	Glennamaddy
Creggauns	186	Tiaquin	Moylough	Mountbellew
Creggeen	151	Longford	Lickmolassy	Portumna
Creggoduff	145	Ballynahinch	Ballindoon	Clifden
Creggpark	8	Leitrim	Ballynakill	Loughrea
**Creggs**	Town	Ballymoe	Kilbegnet	Glennamaddy
Creggs	244	Ballymoe	Kilbegnet	Glennamaddy
Creggymulgreny	98	Dunkellin	Killogilleen	Loughrea
Creglucas	89	Dunkellin	Killeenavarra	Gort
Cregmahon	228	Kiltartan	Beagh	Gort
Cregmore	374	Clare	Lackagh	Galway
Cregmore	201	Dunkellin	Ardrahan	Gort
Cribby Island	3	Leitrim	Inishcaltra	Scarriff
Crinnage (or Ballywulash)	401	Dunkellin	Killora	Loughrea
Croaghill	456	Ballymoe	Templetogher	Glennamaddy
Croaghnakeela Island	141	Ballynahinch	Moyrus	Clifden
Croaghrim	32	Ross	Cong	Oughterard
Crocknaraw	884	Ballynahinch	Ballynakill	Clifden
Croghnut	15	Ballynahinch	Moyrus	Clifden
Cromwell's Island	5	Longford	Meelick	Portumna
Crooroe Park	49	Tiaquin	Monivea	Galway
Crosheen	174	Dunkellin	Drumacoo	Gort
Cross	292	Kilconnell	Grange	Loughrea
Cross Eighter	252	Tiaquin	Killoscobe	Mountbellew
Cross Oughter	442	Tiaquin	Killoscobe	Mountbellew
Crossaun (or Lettera)	86	Clare	Killursa	Tuam
Crossconnell Beg	32	Clonmacnowen	Clontuskert	Ballinasloe
Crossconnell More	178	Clonmacnowen	Clontuskert	Ballinasloe
Crossderry	80	Dunkellin	Lickerrig	Loughrea
Crossmacrin	101	Kilconnell	Grange	Loughrea
Crossooha	481	Kiltartan	Kinvarradoorus	Gort
Crossursa	551	Clare	Kilcoona	Tuam
Crow Island	16	Moycullen	Kilcummin	Oughterard
Crowsnest	463	Longford	Clontuskert	Ballinasloe
Cruagh	82	Ballynahinch	Omey	Clifden
Cruckeen Island	1	Kiltartan	Kinvarradoorus	Gort
Crumlin	661	Tiaquin	Abbeyknockmoy	Tuam
Crumlin East	1626	Ross	Ross	Oughterard
Crumlin West	1088	Ross	Ross	Oughterard
Crummagh	81	Kilconnell	Kilconnell	Ballinasloe
Crump Island	63	Ballynahinch	Ballynakill	Clifden
Crusheeny	141	Clare	Lackagh	Galway
Cuddoo East	276	Tiaquin	Monivea	Loughrea
Cuddoo West	470	Tiaquin	Monivea	Loughrea
Cuilbeg	86	Dunmore	Tuam	Tuam
Cuildooish	261	Dunkellin	Kilcolgan	Gort
Cuilleen	676	Ballynahinch	Moyrus	Clifden
Cuilleen	208	Clare	Cargin	Tuam
Cuilleen	102	Leitrim	Ballynakill	Loughrea
Cuilleendaeagh	81	Leitrim	Ballynakill	Loughrea
Cuilmore	309	Tiaquin	Kilkerrin	Glennamaddy
Cuilmore	140	Loughrea	Kilthomas	Loughrea
Cuilnacappy	184	Ballymoe	Kilbegnet	Glennamaddy
Cuilsallagh	247	Tiaquin	Kilkerrin	Glennamaddy
Culfin	324	Ballynahinch	Ballynakill	Clifden
Cullairbaun	186	Athenry	Athenry	Loughrea
Culleen	360	Clare	Belclare	Tuam
Culleenalena	97	Ross	Cong	Oughterard
Cullenagh	663	Leitrim	Ballynakill	Loughrea
Cullenagh Beg	176	Dunkellin	Ardrahan	Gort
Cullenagh More	381	Dunkellin	Ardrahan	Gort
Culliagh Beg	342	Ross	Ross	Oughterard
Culliagh More	649	Ross	Ross	Oughterard
Culliagh North	361	Tiaquin	Abbeyknockmoy	Tuam
Culliagh South	440	Tiaquin	Abbeyknockmoy	Tuam
Culnagore	129	Longford	Killoran	Ballinasloe
Cultiafadda	346	Ballymoe	Boyounagh	Glennamaddy
Cummer	559	Clare	Cummer	Tuam
Cummer	534	Ross	Ross	Ballinrobe
Cur	1069	Ross	Ross	Oughterard
Curheen	259	Loughrea	Killeenadeema	Loughrea
Curhoor	692	Loughrea	Killeenadeema	Loughrea
Curhownagh	91	Ballynahinch	Ballindoon	Clifden
Curra	174	Moycullen	Moycullen	Galway
Curragh	271	Clonmacnowen	Kilcloony	Ballinasloe
Curragh	159	Leitrim	Ballynakill	Loughrea
Curragh	103	Ballynahinch	Ballynakill	Clifden
Curragh Beg	126	Tiaquin	Kilkerrin	Glennamaddy
Curragh Beg	33	Athenry	Kiltullagh	Loughrea
Curragh East	49	Ballymoe	Templetogher	Glennamaddy
Curragh More	273	Tiaquin	Kilkerrin	Glennamaddy
Curragh More	95	Athenry	Kiltullagh	Loughrea
Curragh West	485	Ballymoe	Templetogher	Glennamaddy
Curraghaderry	272	Dunmore	Liskeevy	Tuam
Curraghaun	589	Dunmore	Dunmore	Tuam
Curraghaun	426	Dunmore	Tuam	Tuam
Curraghbaghla	178	Killian	Athleague	Mountbellew
Curraghbog	123	Ballymoe	Kilbegnet	Glennamaddy
Curraghboy	167	Killian	Killeroran	Mountbellew
Curraghcreen	354	Ballymoe	Tuam	Tuam
Curraghcreen	36	Dunmore	Tuam	Tuam
Curraghduff East	147	Moycullen	Kilcummin	Oughterard
Curraghduff Middle	106	Moycullen	Kilcummin	Oughterard
Curraghduff West	258	Moycullen	Kilcummin	Oughterard
Curraghlehanagh	407	Tiaquin	Kilkerrin	Glennamaddy
Curraghmore	792	Clare	Claregalway	Galway
Curraghmore	365	Clare	Killursa	Tuam
Curraghmore	130	Longford	Lickmolassy	Portumna
Curraghmulmurry	512	Ballymoe	Ballynakill	Glennamaddy
Curraghrevagh	429	Ballymoe	Kilbegnet	Glennamaddy
Curraghroe	99	Loughrea	Kilconickny	Loughrea
Curraghs	55	Loughrea	Loughrea	Loughrea
Curragrean	249	Galway	Oranmore	Galway
Currarevagh	813	Ross	Ross	Oughterard
Currarevagh	179	Moycullen	Kilcummin	Oughterard
Curratober	34	Leitrim	Inishcaltra	Scarriff
Curraun Beg	147	Moycullen	Kilcummin	Oughterard
Curraun Hill	233	Moycullen	Kilcummin	Oughterard
Curraun More	93	Moycullen	Kilcummin	Oughterard
Curraveha (or Birchhall)	116	Moycullen	Kilcummin	Oughterard
Currawatia	122	Moycullen	Moycullen	Galway
Curries	186	Ballymoe	Kilcroan	Glennamaddy
Curry	106	Killian	Ahascragh	Ballinasloe
Curry Eighter	116	Clare	Cummer	Tuam
Curry Oughter	65	Clare	Cummer	Tuam
Currylaur	32	Clare	Cummer	Tuam
Currywongaun	644	Ballynahinch	Ballynakill	Clifden
Curtaun	284	Kiltartan	Beagh	Gort
Cuscarrick	256	Loughrea	Loughrea	Loughrea
Cushatrough	501	Ballynahinch	Omey	Clifden
Cushatrower	1028	Ballynahinch	Moyrus	Clifden
Cusheen Island	9	Kiltartan	Kinvarradoorus	Gort
Cushmaigmore	241	Moycullen	Rahoon	Galway
Cussafoor Island	1	Moycullen	Kilcummin	Oughterard
Dalgin	202	Dunmore	Addergoole	Tuam
Dalysgrove	408	Killian	Ahascragh	Ballinasloe
Dalystown Demesne	509	Leitrim	Leitrim	Loughrea
Dangan Eighter	431	Tiaquin	Killererin	Tuam
Dangan Lower	260	Galway	Rahoon	Galway
Dangan Oughter	357	Tiaquin	Killererin	Tuam
Dangan Upper	280	Galway	Rahoon	Galway
Danganbeg	233	Tiaquin	Killererin	Tuam
Darrary North	160	Dunmore	Dunmore	Tuam
Darrary South	168	Dunmore	Dunmore	Tuam
Dartfield	367	Leitrim	Kilreekill	Loughrea
Dawros	188	Clare	Kilmoylan	Tuam
Dawros Beg	170	Ballynahinch	Ballynakill	Clifden
Dawros Lower	102	Dunmore	Addergoole	Tuam
Dawros More	612	Ballynahinch	Ballynakill	Clifden
Dawros Upper	185	Dunmore	Addergoole	Tuam
Deer Island	4	Ballynahinch	Moyrus	Clifden
Deerfield (or Gortnavea)	57	Moycullen	Moycullen	Galway
Deerpark	468	Athenry	Kilconierin	Loughrea
Deerpark	298	Clare	Killeany	Tuam
Deerpark	214	Longford	Kilquain	Portumna
Deerpark	191	Clonmacnowen	Kilcloony	Ballinasloe
Deerpark	153	Dunkellin	Killeely	Gort
Deerpark	147	Dunmore	Tuam	Tuam
Deerpark	121	Clare	Athenry	Galway
Deerpark	117	Dunkellin	Kilchreest	Loughrea
Deerpark	110	Longford	Lickmolassy	Portumna
Deerpark	108	Clare	Kilkilvery	Tuam
Deerpark	97	Ross	Cong	Oughterard
Deerpark	65	Dunkellin	Oranmore	Galway
Deerpark	50	Kiltartan	Kiltartan	Gort
Demesne	374	Dunmore	Tuam	Tuam
Derradda	1506	Moycullen	Kilcummin	Oughterard
Derradda	230	Longford	Killimorbologue	Portumna
Derradda	225	Clonmacnowen	Kilclooney	Ballinasloe
Derradda South	107	Longford	Killimorbologue	Portumna
Derrainy	615	Leitrim	Clonrush	Scarriff
Derravonniff	1102	Moycullen	Kilcummin	Oughterard
Derreen	708	Ross	Ross	Oughterard
Derreen	597	Kiltartan	Kilbeacanty	Gort
Derreen	559	Killian	Taghboy	Mountbellew
Derreen	379	Longford	Kiltormer	Ballinasloe
Derreen	211	Ballymoe	Ballynakill	Glennamaddy
Derreen	198	Ballynahinch	Omey	Clifden
Derreen	186	Tiaquin	Abbeyknockmoy	Tuam
Derreen Lower	181	Tiaquin	Kilkerrin	Glennamaddy
Derreen Upper	351	Tiaquin	Kilkerrin	Glennamaddy
Derreenboy	145	Longford	Killoran	Ballinasloe
Derreenmeel	426	Moycullen	Kilcummin	Oughterard
Derreennagusfoor	762	Moycullen	Kilcummin	Oughterard
Derreennamucka	767	Leitrim	Ballynakill	Loughrea
Derreighter	877	Moycullen	Kilcummin	Oughterard
Derrew	357	Longford	Kilquain	Portumna
Derrew	150	Longford	Killimorbologue	Portumna
Derrigimlagh	2636	Ballynahinch	Ballindoon	Clifden
Derrinlough	236	Tiaquin	Kilkerrin	Glennamaddy
Derroogh	391	Tiaquin	Monivea	Loughrea
Derroogh North	1232	Moycullen	Kilcummin	Oughterard
Derroogh South	1679	Moycullen	Kilcummin	Oughterard
Derrooghs	650	Tiaquin	Kilkerrin	Glennamaddy
Derroran East	887	Leitrim	Inishcaltra	Scarriff
Derroran West	993	Leitrim	Inishcaltra	Scarriff
Derroura	646	Moycullen	Kilcummin	Oughterard
Derry	2101	Ross	Ballinchalla	Ballinrobe
Derry	879	Longford	Meelick	Portumna
Derry	353	Kiltartan	Beagh	Gort
Derry	208	Dunkellin	Ballynacourty	Galway
Derryadd East	421	Ballynahinch	Moyrus	Clifden
Derryadd West	1414	Ballynahinch	Moyrus	Clifden
Derrybaun	175	Clare	Killererin	Tuam
Derrybeg	214	Moycullen	Kilcummin	Oughterard
Derrybeg	151	Leitrim	Tynagh	Portumna
Derrybrien East	2602	Loughrea	Killeenadeema	Loughrea
Derrybrien North	2846	Loughrea	Killeenadeema	Loughrea
Derrybrien South	2473	Loughrea	Killeenadeema	Loughrea
Derrybrien West	2145	Loughrea	Killeenadeema	Loughrea
Derrycallan Commons	269	Kiltartan	Beagh	Gort
Derrycallan North	327	Kiltartan	Beagh	Gort
Derrycallan South	265	Kiltartan	Beagh	Gort
Derryclare	2531	Ballynahinch	Moyrus	Clifden
Derrycon Lower	273	Leitrim	Inishcaltra	Scarriff
Derrycon Upper	788	Leitrim	Inishcaltra	Scarriff
Derrycrag	283	Leitrim	Ballynakill	Loughrea
Derrycrib	445	Moycullen	Rahoon	Galway
Derrycunlagh	2128	Ballynahinch	Moyrus	Clifden
Derrydonnell Beg	296	Dunkellin	Athenry	Galway
Derrydonnell More	523	Athenry	Athenry	Loughrea
Derrydonnell North	317	Dunkellin	Athenry	Galway
Derryeighter	116	Ballynahinch	Ballindoon	Clifden
Derryerglinna	661	Moycullen	Kilcummin	Oughterard
Derryfadda	1688	Killian	Taghboy	Mountbellew
Derryfrench	676	Leitrim	Tynagh	Loughrea
Derrygarriff	66	Leitrim	Ballynakill	Loughrea
Derrygill	544	Leitrim	Ballynakill	Portumna
Derryglassaun	873	Tiaquin	Moylough	Mountbellew
Derrygoolin North	2202	Leitrim	Ballynakill	Portumna
Derrygoolin South	2079	Leitrim	Ballynakill	Portumna
Derryherbert	552	Ballynahinch	Ballynakill	Clifden
Derryherbert	157	Moycullen	Kilcummin	Oughterard
Derryhippoo	565	Ballymoe	Kilbegnet	Roscommon
Derryhiveney North	751	Longford	Kilmalinoge	Portumna
Derryhiveney South	570	Longford	Kilmalinoge	Portumna
Derryhoyle Beg	197	Dunkellin	Lickerrig	Loughrea
Derryhoyle More	250	Dunkellin	Lickerrig	Loughrea
Derryinver	867	Ballynahinch	Ballynakill	Clifden
Derrykeel	590	Kiltartan	Kilbeacanty	Gort
Derrykyle	1428	Moycullen	Killannin	Galway
Derrylahan	118	Leitrim	Ballynakill	Loughrea
Derrylahan	67	Ballynahinch	Ballynakill	Clifden
Derrylaura	86	Moycullen	Kilcummin	Oughterard
Derrylea	1634	Ballynahinch	Moyrus	Clifden
Derryloney	43	Galway	Rahoon	Galway
Derryloughaun East	378	Moycullen	Moycullen	Galway
Derryloughaun West	300	Moycullen	Moycullen	Galway
Derrymaclaughna	207	Clare	Athenry	Galway
Derrymore	370	Tiaquin	Killosolan	Mountbellew
Derrymore	360	Clare	Donaghpatrick	Tuam
Derrymore	238	Kilconnell	Fohanagh	Mountbellew
Derrymore	176	Dunmore	Dunmore	Tuam
Derrymullan	225	Clonmacnowen	Kilcloony	Ballinasloe
Derrynabrin	318	Tiaquin	Kilkerrin	Glennamaddy
Derrynacleigh	1058	Ballynahinch	Ballynakill	Clifden
Derrynagran	302	Tiaquin	Kilkerrin	Glennamaddy
Derrynamanagh	705	Kilconnell	Grange	Loughrea
Derrynavglaun	1362	Ballynahinch	Moyrus	Clifden
Derrynea	1122	Moycullen	Killannin	Oughterard
Derryneen	221	Ballynahinch	Moyrus	Clifden
Derryoober East	477	Leitrim	Ballynakill	Portumna
Derryoober West	1198	Leitrim	Ballynakill	Portumna
Derryoughter	74	Moycullen	Rahoon	Galway
Derrypark	279	Ross	Ballinchalla	Ballinrobe
Derryrush	1634	Ballynahinch	Moyrus	Clifden
Derrysillagh	137	Ballynahinch	Moyrus	Clifden
Derrysiskal	177	Longford	Killimorbologue	Portumna
Derryvealawauma	1434	Ballynahinch	Moyrus	Clifden
Derryvicrune	852	Ballynahinch	Moyrus	Clifden
Derryvoghil	579	Moycullen	Killannin	Oughterard
Derryvokeel	457	Loughrea	Ardrahan	Gort
Derryvoreada	740	Ballynahinch	Moyrus	Clifden
Derryvrisk	973	Moycullen	Kilcummin	Oughterard
Derryvunlan	1146	Leitrim	Ballynakill	Portumna
Derrywee East	143	Kiltartan	Kilthomas	Gort
Derrywee West	761	Kiltartan	Kilthomas	Gort
Derrywode	482	Ballymoe	Templetogher	Glennamaddy
Devenish Island	9	Moycullen	Kilcummin	Oughterard
Dinish	95	Moycullen	Kilcummin	Oughterard
Dirkbeg	1519	Ross	Ballinchalla	Ballinrobe
Dog Island	4	Moycullen	Kilcummin	Oughterard
Dog Island	1	Longford	Clonfert	Ballinasloe
Dolan	1084	Ballynahinch	Ballindoon	Clifden
Donaghpatrick	693	Clare	Donaghpatrick	Tuam
Doocreggaun	195	Clonmacnowen	Aughrim	Ballinasloe
Doogarraun	272	Dunkellin	Kilconickny	Loughrea
Dooghcloon	728	Kilconnell	Killimordaly	Loughrea
Dooghta	1567	Ross	Cong	Oughterard
Doohulla	887	Ballynahinch	Ballindoon	Clifden
Dooletter	904	Ross	Ross	Ballinrobe
Dooletter East	739	Ballynahinch	Moyrus	Clifden
Dooletter West	527	Ballynahinch	Moyrus	Clifden
Doon	957	Moycullen	Killannin	Oughterard
Doon	855	Leitrim	Kilreekill	Loughrea
Doon	554	Ballynahinch	Omey	Clifden
Doon Lower	116	Kilconnell	Fohanagh	Mountbellew
Doon Upper	1126	Kilconnell	Fohanagh	Mountbellew
Doonally East	380	Loughrea	Kilthomas	Gort
Doonally West	113	Loughrea	Kilthomas	Gort
Doonard	43	Dunkellin	Killora	Loughrea
Doonaree	217	Kilconnell	Killallaghtan	Ballinasloe
Doonaun	144	Tiaquin	Moylough	Mountbellew
Doonbeg	249	Clare	Kilmoylan	Tuam
Dooneen	24	Ballynahinch	Ballynakill	Clifden
Dooneen Island	4	Ross	Ross	Oughterard
Doonloughan	186	Ballynahinch	Ballindoon	Clifden
Doonowen	279	Kiltartan	Kilmacduagh	Gort
Doonreaghan	158	Ballynahinch	Moyrus	Clifden
Doonwood	323	Tiaquin	Killoscobe	Mountbellew
Dooros	1057	Leitrim	Ballynakill	Portumna
Dooros	535	Ross	Cong	Oughterard
Dooros	266	Longford	Clonfert	Ballinasloe
Dooros	66	Leitrim	Inishcaltra	Scarriff
Dooroy	409	Ross	Cong	Oughterard
Doorus	261	Kiltartan	Kinvarradoorus	Gort
Doorus Demesne	90	Kiltartan	Kinvarradoorus	Gort
Dooruspark	136	Kiltartan	Kinvarradoorus	Gort
Dooyeher	347	Ballynahinch	Moyrus	Clifden
Doughiska	615	Galway	Oranmore	Galway
Dovepark	46	Moycullen	Moycullen	Galway
Drimcong	117	Moycullen	Moycullen	Galway
Drimmavohaun	497	Moycullen	Moycullen	Galway
Drimmeen	257	Ballynahinch	Ballindoon	Clifden
Drimna East	76	Leitrim	Tynagh	Portumna
Drimna West	77	Leitrim	Tynagh	Portumna
Drimnahoon	88	Moycullen	Killannin	Oughterard
Drimneen	59	Moycullen	Moycullen	Galway
Drimneen	39	Moycullen	Kilcummin	Oughterard
Drin	697	Ross	Ross	Oughterard
Drinagh	393	Ballynahinch	Ballindoon	Clifden
Drinaun	873	Killian	Killeroran	Mountbellew
Drinaun	37	Dunmore	Tuam	Tuam
Drishaghaun	512	Ross	Ross	Oughterard
Dromorehill	144	Kiltartan	Kilthomas	Gort
Dromorehill	53	Kiltartan	Kiltartan	Gort
Drought	482	Leitrim	Kilreekill	Loughrea
Drum	688	Leitrim	Ballynakill	Loughrea
Drum	279	Dunmore	Addergoole	Tuam
Drum	256	Dunmore	Tuam	Tuam
Drum	108	Clonmacnowen	Clontuskert	Ballinasloe
Drum East	197	Galway	Rahoon	Galway
Drum West	226	Galway	Rahoon	Galway
Drumacoo	246	Dunkellin	Drumacoo	Gort
Drumaskin	178	Dunmore	Tuam	Tuam
Drumaskin	25	Dunmore	Dunmore	Tuam
Drumatober	310	Longford	Abbeygormacan	Ballinasloe
Drumbane	402	Dunmore	Dunmore	Tuam
Drumbaun	35	Clare	Annaghdown	Galway
Drumbulcaun	228	Dunmore	Tuam	Tuam
Drumeyre	275	Longford	Abbeygormacan	Ballinasloe
Drumgooaun	135	Kiltartan	Beagh	Gort
Drumgriffin	233	Clare	Annaghdown	Galway
Drumharsna North	127	Dunkellin	Ardrahan	Gort
Drumharsna South	689	Dunkellin	Ardrahan	Gort
Drumhogan	108	Longford	Abbeygormacan	Ballinasloe
Drumkeary East	484	Leitrim	Ballynakill	Loughrea
Drumkeary East	242	Leitrim	Ballynakill	Loughrea
Drummaan East	359	Leitrim	Clonrush	Scarriff
Drummaan South	199	Leitrim	Clonrush	Scarriff
Drummaan West	189	Leitrim	Clonrush	Scarriff
Drummaanadeevan	32	Leitrim	Clonrush	Scarriff
Drummaveg	272	Moycullen	Moycullen	Galway
Drummin	816	Kiltartan	Kilbeacanty	Gort
Drummin	381	Loughrea	Kilteskill	Loughrea
Drummin	210	Leitrim	Ballynakill	Portumna
Drummin	108	Loughrea	Killeenadeema	Loughrea
Drumminacloghaun	218	Kiltartan	Kilmacduagh	Gort
Drumminacoosaun	156	Loughrea	Kilthomas	Gort
Drumminalough	216	Kiltartan	Kilbeacanty	Gort
Drumminnakill	50	Moycullen	Kilcummin	Oughterard
Drumminnamuckla North	299	Leitrim	Ballynakill	Loughrea
Drumminnamuckla South	524	Leitrim	Ballynakill	Loughrea
Drumscar	353	Longford	Lickmolassy	Portumna
Drumsnauv	486	Ross	Cong	Oughterard
Duck Island	13	Ballynahinch	Ballindoon	Clifden
Dunamon	348	Ballymoe	Dunamon	Roscommon
Dunblaney	450	Ballymoe	Dunmore	Tuam
Dundoogan	205	Clonmacnowen	Kilgerrill	Ballinasloe
Dungory East	132	Kiltartan	Kinvarradoorus	Gort
Dungory West	76	Kiltartan	Kinvarradoorus	Gort
Duniry	117	Leitrim	Duniry	Portumna
Dunkellin	101	Dunkellin	Killeely	Gort
Dunlo	346	Clonmacnowen	Kilcloony	Ballinasloe
**Dunmore**	Town	Dunmore	Dunmore	Tuam
**Dunmore**	Town	Ballymoe	Dunmore	Tuam
Dunmore	142	Dunmore	Dunmore	Tuam
Dunmore Demesne	121	Dunmore	Dunmore	Tuam
Dunsandle	651	Loughrea	Lickerrig	Loughrea
Durrow	229	Ballymoe	Drumatemple	Glennamaddy
Eaglehill	160	Leitrim	Ballynakill	Loughrea
Earls Island	6	Ross	Ross	Oughterard
Earlspark	587	Loughrea	Killeenadeema	Loughrea
Earlspark	326	Loughrea	Loughrea	Loughrea
Eashal Island	12	Ballynahinch	Omey	Clifden
Easterfield	251	Leitrim	Ballynakill	Portumna
Easterfield (or Cornacask)	484	Killian	Athleague	Mountbellew
Eastwell	597	Kilconnell	Killallaghtan	Ballinasloe
Edenhill	73	Loughrea	Killogilleen	Loughrea
Eglish	567	Killian	Ahascragh	Ballinasloe
Eighterard	116	Moycullen	Kilcummin	Oughterard
Ellagh	359	Kilconnell	Kilconnell	Ballinasloe
Ellagh	128	Clare	Killursa	Tuam
Elmhill	308	Tiaquin	Moylough	Mountbellew
Emlagh	313	Ballynahinch	Omey	Clifden
Emlagh	236	Leitrim	Kilreekill	Loughrea
Emlagh	213	Dunkellin	Killogilleen	Loughrea
Emlagharan	398	Ballynahinch	Ballindoon	Clifden
Emlaghdauroe	750	Ballynahinch	Moyrus	Clifden
Emlaghmore	1736	Ballynahinch	Moyrus	Clifden
Emlaghmore	1178	Ballynahinch	Ballindoon	Clifden
Englishtown	222	Longford	Killoran	Ballinasloe
Eragh Island South	10	Moycullen	Kilcummin	Oughterard
Errisbeg East	1471	Ballynahinch	Moyrus	Clifden
Errisbeg West	1120	Ballynahinch	Moyrus	Clifden
Ervallagh	353	Ballynahinch	Moyrus	Clifden
Ervallagh Eighter	110	Clonmacnowen	Ahascragh	Ballinasloe
Ervallagh Oughter	536	Clonmacnowen	Ahascragh	Ballinasloe
Esker	1633	Longford	Clonfert	Ballinasloe
Esker	811	Tiaquin	Ballymacward	Mountbellew
Esker	262	Athenry	Kiltullagh	Loughrea
Esker	79	Tiaquin	Moylough	Mountbellew
Esker Island	9	Longford	Clonfert	Ballinasloe
Eskerballycahill	363	Kilconnell	Killosolan	Mountbellew
Eskerboy	743	Longford	Abbeygormacan	Ballinasloe
Eskerkeel	34	Clonmacnowen	Clontuskert	Ballinasloe
Eskermore	222	Killian	Ahascragh	Mountbellew
Eskermurry	51	Killian	Killeroran	Mountbellew
Eskeroe	321	Tiaquin	Killoscobe	Mountbellew
Eskeromullacaun	864	Tiaquin	Boyounagh	Glennamaddy
Eskerroe	19	Clonmacnowen	Kilcloony	Ballinasloe
Eskershanore	203	Loughrea	Kilchreest	Loughrea
Evneenmore Island	24	Moycullen	Kilcummin	Oughterard
Eyrecourt Demesne	723	Longford	Donanaghta	Portumna
Eyrecourt Demesne	61	Longford	Clonfert	Portumna
Eyrephort	142	Ballynahinch	Omey	Clifden
Faartan	519	Ballymoe	Ballynakill	Glennamaddy
Fahy	808	Longford	Fahy	Portumna
Fahy	208	Kilconnell	Killallaghtan	Ballinasloe
Fahy	208	Tiaquin	Clonkeen	Loughrea
Fahy	204	Ballynahinch	Omey	Clifden
Fahy	110	Moycullen	Killannin	Oughterard
Fahy	105	Ross	Ross	Oughterard
Fahymactibbot	233	Dunkellin	Killeeneen	Gort
Fahysvillage	89	Athenry	Athenry	Galway
Fairfield	936	Clonmacnowen	Kilgerrill	Ballinasloe
Fairfield	422	Ballymoe	Kilbegnet	Glennamaddy
Fairfield	145	Loughrea	Loughrea	Loughrea
Fairfield (or Gortrea)	279	Longford	Kilmalinoge	Portumna
Fairhill	401	Tiaquin	Killoscobe	Mountbellew
Fairyhill	350	Longford	Lickmolassy	Portumna
Fakeeragh	137	Ballynahinch	Omey	Clifden
Farm	503	Ballymoe	Templetogher	Glennamaddy
Farmhill	181	Tiaquin	Abbeyknockmoy	Tuam
Farnaght	257	Ross	Cong	Oughterard
Farnaun	112	Loughrea	Kilthomas	Gort
Farranablake East	148	Athenry	Athenry	Loughrea
Farranablake West	51	Athenry	Athenry	Loughrea
Farranalynch	40	Loughrea	Loughrea	Loughrea
Farrangavnagh	57	Clare	Cargin	Tuam
Farrannabox	25	Clare	Tuam	Tuam
Farrannuamartin	93	Clare	Tuam	Tuam
Farravaun	1125	Clare	Monivea	Galway
Farravaun	232	Moycullen	Kilcummin	Oughterard
Farta	133	Athenry	Kiltullagh	Loughrea
Fartagar	196	Dunmore	Kilbennan	Tuam
Fartamore	563	Dunmore	Kilconly	Tuam
Faul	185	Ballynahinch	Moyrus	Clifden
Faulkner's Island	1	Longford	Lickmolassy	Portumna
Faunin	90	Kiltartan	Kilmacduagh	Gort
Fawnarevagh	284	Dunkellin	Kilcolgan	Gort
Feagh	332	Leitrim	Duniry	Portumna
Feagh	97	Longford	Kiltormer	Ballinasloe
Feagh East	206	Tiaquin	Abbeyknockmoy	Tuam
Feagh West	498	Tiaquin	Abbeyknockmoy	Tuam
Feaghbeg	746	Longford	Fahy	Portumna
Feaghmore Eighter	221	Longford	Fahy	Portumna
Feaghmore Oughter	164	Longford	Fahy	Portumna
Fear Beg	37	Dunmore	Dunmore	Tuam
Fear More	79	Dunmore	Dunmore	Tuam
Fearagha	762	Clare	Kilcoona	Tuam
Fearmore	178	Longford	Clonfert	Portumna
Fearmore	82	Longford	Meelick	Portumna
Feebrack (or Nutgrove)	264	Longford	Tynagh	Portumna
Felimspark	45	Ballymoe	Boyounagh	Glennamaddy
Ffrenchpark	14	Kilconnell	Killosolan	Mountbellew
Ffrenchpark Acres	20	Killian	Killian	Mountbellew
Fiddaun	757	Kiltartan	Beagh	Gort
Fiddaun	296	Dunkellin	Ardrahan	Loughrea
Fiddaun	225	Tiaquin	Kilkerrin	Glennamaddy
Fiddaun Island	4	Dunkellin	Drumacoo	Galway
Finish Island	153	Ballynahinch	Moyrus	Clifden
Finisklin	558	Moycullen	Moycullen	Galway
Finnaun	7555	Moycullen	Killannin	Galway
Finnisglin	1086	Ballynahinch	Ballynakill	Clifden
Finnure	317	Leitrim	Abbeygormacan	Loughrea
Finny	278	Ross	Ross	Ballinrobe
Firpark	91	Tiaquin	Abbeyknockmoy	Tuam
Flaskagh Beg	509	Ballymoe	Dunmore	Glennamaddy
Flaskagh More	649	Ballymoe	Dunmore	Glennamaddy
Flat Island	1	Ballynahinch	Moyrus	Clifden
Flowerhill (or Bouluskeagh)	321	Longford	Tynagh	Portumna
Foats (or Levallynearl)	224	Kilconnell	Aughrim	Ballinasloe
Fohanagh	633	Kilconnell	Fohanagh	Mountbellew
Foher	623	Ballynahinch	Ballynakill	Clifden
Foolagh	106	Longford	Tynagh	Portumna
Foorannagh	3	Moycullen	Kilcummin	Oughterard
Foorglass	222	Ballynahinch	Ballindoon	Clifden
Foorkill (or Coldwood)	602	Dunkellin	Athenry	Galway
Formweel	1246	Moycullen	Kilcummin	Galway
Forramoyle East	255	Galway	Rahoon	Galway
Forramoyle West	221	Galway	Rahoon	Galway
Fortbrown	270	Ballymoe	Clonbern	Glennamaddy
Fortpark	35	Dunmore	Dunmore	Tuam
Fortyacres	185	Dunmore	Tuam	Tuam
Fortyacres	161	Ballymoe	Templetogher	Glennamaddy
Fortyacres	72	Clare	Killererin	Tuam
Fough East	43	Moycullen	Kilcummin	Oughterard
Fough West	20	Moycullen	Kilcummin	Oughterard
Fountainhill (or Knockacilra)	143	Ballynahinch	Omey	Clifden
Fox Island	3	Ballynahinch	Ballindoon	Clifden
Foxhall	304	Longford	Abbeygormacan	Loughrea
Foxhall Little	389	Longford	Abbeygormacan	Loughrea
Frass	285	Ballymoe	Boyounagh	Glennamaddy
Freaghillaun	39	Ballynahinch	Moyrus	Clifden
Freaghillaun North	9	Ballynahinch	Ballynakill	Clifden
Freaghillaun South	57	Ballynahinch	Ballynakill	Clifden
Freaghillaun-beg	26	Moycullen	Kilcummin	Oughterard
Freaghillaun-more	22	Moycullen	Kilcummin	Oughterard
Freaghillaun-more	8	Moycullen	Kilcummin	Oughterard
Freeheen Island	1	Moycullen	Kilcummin	Oughterard
Freeport	40	Galway	Rahoon	Galway
**Frenchfort**	Town	Dunkellin	Oranmore	Galway
Frenchfort	1379	Dunkellin	Oranmore	Galway
Frenchpark	163	Dunkellin	Kilcolgan	Gort
Friar Island	24	Ballynahinch	Omey	Clifden
Friars Island	29	Moycullen	Moycullen	Galway
Friarsisland	127	Longford	Meelick	Portumna
Friarsland	32	Longford	Meelick	Portumna
Friary	12	Leitrim	Ballynakill	Portumna
Funshadaun	583	Loughrea	Killeenadeema	Loughrea
Funshin	532	Ballymoe	Kilbegnet	Glennamaddy
Funshin Beg	549	Kiltartan	Kinvarradoorus	Gort
Funshin More	832	Kiltartan	Kinvarradoorus	Gort
Furboghgarve	125	Moycullen	Rahoon	Galway
Furnace	218	Moycullen	Kilcummin	Oughterard
Furnace	144	Leitrim	Clonrush	Scarriff
Furzypark	210	Dunkellin	Ardrahan	Gort
Furzypark	58	Loughrea	Isertkelly	Loughrea
Furzypark	42	Athenry	Athenry	Loughrea
Fynagh	274	Longford	Clonfert	Ballinasloe
Galboley	451	Athenry	Kiltullagh	Loughrea
Galboley	104	Athenry	Killimordaly	Loughrea
Gallagh	425	Tiaquin	Killosolan	Mountbellew
**Galway**	Town	Borough of Galway	Rahoon	Galway
**Galway**	Town	Borough of Galway	St. Nicholas	Galway
Gannaveen	407	Longford	Clontuskert	Ballinasloe
Gannoughs	233	Ballynahinch	Omey	Clifden
Gannow	94	Kilconnell	Grange	Loughrea
Ganty	135	Dunkellin	Kilconierin	Loughrea
Garbally	74	Tiaquin	Moylough	Mountbellew
Garbally Demesne	1042	Clonmacnowen	Kilcloony	Ballinasloe
Gardenblake	303	Loughrea	Kilthomas	Gort
Gardenblake Commons	537	Loughrea	Kilthomas	Gort
Gardenfield	314	Dunmore	Tuam	Tuam
Gardenham (or Garrymore)	145	Clare	Annaghdown	Galway
Gardenham (or Garrymore)	65	Clare	Lackagh	Galway
Garra	124	Clare	Killererin	Tuam
Garracloon	74	Dunmore	Tuam	Tuam
Garracloon North	87	Dunkellin	Kilconierin	Loughrea
Garracloon South	93	Dunkellin	Kilconierin	Loughrea
Garrafine	242	Kilconnell	Ballymacward	Mountbellew
Garrafine (Trench)	229	Kilconnell	Ballymacward	Mountbellew
Garrafine (Ussher)	561	Kilconnell	Ballymacward	Mountbellew
Garrafrauns	201	Dunmore	Dunmore	Tuam
Garranagerra	1342	Ross	Ballinrobe	Ballinrobe
Garrankyle East	49	Dunkellin	Kilconierin	Loughrea
Garrankyle West	77	Dunkellin	Kilconierin	Loughrea
Garraun	251	Leitrim	Tynagh	Portumna
Garraun	168	Clare	Lackagh	Galway
Garraun	96	Dunkellin	Killeely	Gort
Garraun	64	Leitrim	Ballynakill	Loughrea
Garraun	48	Leitrim	Clonrush	Scarriff
Garraun	33	Clare	Killererin	Tuam
Garraun (Coyle)	222	Clare	Killererin	Tuam
Garraun Beg	102	Clare	Killererin	Tuam
Garraun Lower	214	Dunkellin	Ballynacourty	Galway
Garraun More	172	Clare	Killererin	Tuam
Garraun North	500	Dunkellin	Oranmore	Galway
Garraun North	280	Clare	Belclare	Tuam
Garraun North	225	Ballymoe	Kilbegnet	Roscommon
Garraun South	347	Clare	Belclare	Tuam
Garraun South	248	Dunkellin	Oranmore	Galway
Garraun South	154	Ballymoe	Kilbegnet	Roscommon
Garraun Upper	174	Dunkellin	Ballynacourty	Galway
Garraunard	167	Tiaquin	Monivea	Tuam
Garraunbaun	293	Ballymoe	Clonbern	Tuam
Garraunbaun	171	Ballynahinch	Ballynakill	Clifden
Garrauncreen	213	Clare	Kilmoylan	Tuam
Garraunmore	245	Ballymoe	Kilbegnet	Glennamaddy
Garraunnameetagh	303	Longford	Tynagh	Portumna
Garraunphaudeen	46	Leitrim	Ballynakill	Loughrea
Garrauns	177	Ballymoe	Clonbern	Tuam
Garrauns	165	Dunmore	Dunmore	Tuam
Garrauns	150	Dunmore	Tuam	Tuam
Garreer	176	Killian	Athleague	Mountbellew
Garrison	107	Longford	Kiltormer	Ballinasloe
Garrivinnagh	360	Moycullen	Kilcummin	Oughterard
Garroman	1966	Ballynahinch	Moyrus	Clifden
Garryad & Garryduff	346	Longford	Killimorbologue	Portumna
Garryboghala	125	Leitrim	Abbeygormacan	Loughrea
Garryduff	406	Longford	Clonfert	Ballinasloe
Garryduff	166	Tiaquin	Killosolan	Mountbellew
Garryduff	70	Clonmacnowen	Clontuskert	Ballinasloe
Garryduff and Garryad	346	Longford	Killimorbologue	Portumna
Garryeighter	289	Leitrim	Clonrush	Scarriff
Garryhubert	110	Leitrim	Duniry	Loughrea
Garryland	350	Kiltartan	Kilmacduagh	Gort
Garrylawrence	42	Clonmacnowen	Clontuskert	Ballinasloe
Garrymore	446	Kilconnell	Ballymacward	Ballinasloe
Garrymore	273	Kilconnell	Aughrim	Ballinasloe
Garrymore	7	Dunmore	Tuam	Tuam
Garrymore (or Gardenham)	145	Clare	Annaghdown	Galway
Garrymore (or Gardenham)	65	Clare	Lackagh	Galway
Garrynaglogh	98	Leitrim	Ballynakill	Portumna
Garrynagry	168	Moycullen	Killannin	Oughterard
Garrynamishaun (or Aughrim Plots)	125	Kilconnell	Aughrim	Ballinasloe
Garrynasillagh	51	Longford	Killimorbologue	Portumna
Gaterstreet	1	Ballymoe	Dunmore	Tuam
Geehy North	68	Kiltartan	Kinvarradoorus	Gort
Geehy South	134	Kiltartan	Kinvarradoorus	Gort
Gilkagh	553	Tiaquin	Moylough	Mountbellew
Gilkagh East	106	Ballymoe	Kilcroan	Glennamaddy
Gilkagh West	141	Ballymoe	Kilcroan	Glennamaddy
Gilroe	340	Kiltartan	Beagh	Gort
Ginnaun	172	Ballymoe	Tuam	Tuam
Glassillaun	322	Ballynahinch	Ballynakill	Clifden
Glassillaun	4	Moycullen	Kilcummin	Oughterard
Glassillaun	2	Ballynahinch	Ballynakill	Clifden
Glassillaun Islands	1	Ballynahinch	Ballindoon	Clifden
Glassillaunvealnacurra	6	Ballynahinch	Ballindoon	Clifden
Glebe	132	Kilconnell	Killosolan	Mountbellew
Glebe	66	Longford	Clonfert	Ballinasloe
Glebe	65	Tiaquin	Kilkerrin	Glennamaddy
Glebe	55	Clare	Kilkilvery	Tuam
Glebe	53	Dunkellin	Kilconierin	Loughrea
Glebe	45	Kilconnell	Kilconnell	Ballinasloe
Glebe	37	Moycullen	Kilcummin	Oughterard
Glebe	33	Clare	Annaghdown	Galway
Glebe	23	Clare	Tuam	Tuam
Glebe	14	Clare	Cummer	Tuam
Glen	291	Ballynahinch	Omey	Clifden
Glen	175	Dunmore	Dunmore	Tuam
Glen	167	Tiaquin	Kilkerrin	Glennamaddy
Glenaclara East	173	Loughrea	Killeenadeema	Loughrea
Glenaclara West	128	Loughrea	Killeenadeema	Loughrea
Glenanail	178	Galway	St. Nicholas	Galway
Glenatallan	119	Dunkellin	Kilconickny	Loughrea
Glenaun	104	Clonmacnowen	Clontuskert	Ballinasloe
Glenbeg East	244	Ross	Ross	Ballinrobe
Glenbeg West	511	Ross	Ross	Ballinrobe
Glenbrack	631	Kiltartan	Kiltartan	Gort
Glenbrickeen	567	Ballynahinch	Omey	Clifden
Glencoaghan	3139	Ballynahinch	Moyrus	Clifden
Glencoh	626	Moycullen	Kilcummin	Oughterard
Glencraff	1562	Ballynahinch	Ballynakill	Clifden
Glencrees	95	Ballynahinch	Moyrus	Clifden
Glendaruid	550	Ballynahinch	Moyrus	Clifden
Glengowla East	366	Moycullen	Kilcummin	Oughterard
Glengowla West	597	Moycullen	Kilcummin	Oughterard
Glenicmurrin	2482	Moycullen	Kilcummin	Galway
Gleninagh	2654	Ballynahinch	Moyrus	Clifden
Gleninagh	657	Ballynahinch	Ballynakill	Clifden
Glenloughaun	299	Clonmacnowen	Clontuskert	Ballinasloe
Glenlusk	401	Ross	Cong	Oughterard
Glenmeen	220	Leitrim	Kilreekill	Loughrea
Glenmore	224	Clare	Lackagh	Galway
Glennafosha	481	Clare	Belclare	Tuam
Glennagarraun	109	Clare	Kilkilvery	Tuam
Glennagevlagh	1203	Ross	Ross	Oughterard
Glennagloghaun	533	Tiaquin	Monivea	Loughrea
Glennagloghaun North	418	Tiaquin	Monivea	Tuam
Glennagloghaun South	365	Tiaquin	Monivea	Tuam
**Glennamaddy**	Town	Ballymoe	Boyounagh	Glennamaddy
Glennamaddy	299	Ballymoe	Boyounagh	Glennamaddy
Glennamucka	347	Tiaquin	Ballymacward	Loughrea
Glennaneeny	180	Clare	Cummer	Tuam
Glennascaul	947	Dunkellin	Oranmore	Galway
Glennaskehy	422	Leitrim	Kilreekill	Loughrea
Glennaslat	168	Tiaquin	Monivea	Tuam
Glennaslat	168	Leitrim	Kilteskill	Loughrea
Glennaun	1228	Moycullen	Killannin	Galway
Glennaun	397	Ballynahinch	Moyrus	Clifden
Glennavaddoge	111	Clonmacnowen	Kilcloony	Ballinasloe
Glennavaddoge	68	Longford	Meelick	Portumna
Glennaveel	274	Tiaquin	Abbeyknockmoy	Tuam
Glenrevagh	553	Clare	Annaghdown	Tuam
Glenrevagh	133	Dunkellin	Oranmore	Galway
Glentrasna	1850	Moycullen	Kilcummin	Oughterard
Glenwanish.	490	Leitrim	Inishcaltra	Scarriff
Glinsk	1161	Ballynahinch	Moyrus	Clifden
Glinsk	871	Ballymoe	Ballynakill	Glennamaddy
Gloves East	265	Athenry	Kiltullagh	Loughrea
Gloves Middle	370	Athenry	Kiltullagh	Loughrea
Gloves Middle	216	Athenry	Athenry	Loughrea
Gloves South	326	Athenry	Kiltullagh	Loughrea
Gloves West	155	Athenry	Athenry	Loughrea
Gloves West	105	Athenry	Kiltullagh	Loughrea
Goatland	24	Longford	Clonfert	Ballinasloe
Golam	34	Moycullen	Kilcummin	Oughterard
Goldenpark	134	Clare	Killower	Tuam
Gooreen	145	Ballynahinch	Omey	Clifden
Gooreenatinny	117	Ballynahinch	Omey	Clifden
Goose Island	3	Dunkellin	Ballynacourty	Galway
Goose Island	1	Longford	Lickmolassy	Portumna
**Gort**	Town	Kiltartan	Kiltartan	Gort
**Gort**	Town	Kiltartan	Kilmacduagh	Gort
**Gort**	Town	Kiltartan	Beagh	Gort
Gort	170	Kiltartan	Kiltartan	Gort
Gortaboy	163	Dunkellin	Killeenavarra	Gort
Gortacallow (or Angliham)	269	Galway	Oranmore	Galway
Gortacarnaun	1611	Kiltartan	Kilbeacanty	Gort
Gortacarnaun	446	Moycullen	Killannin	Oughterard
Gortachalla	452	Moycullen	Moycullen	Galway
Gortacoosaun	186	Killian	Killeroran	Mountbellew
Gortadeegan	31	Kilconnell	Kilconnell	Ballinasloe
Gortadooey	229	Clare	Claregalway	Galway
Gortadragaun	724	Loughrea	Kilthomas	Gort
Gortadullisk	172	Longford	Tiranascragh	Portumna
Gortaganny	296	Tiaquin	Boyounagh	Glennamaddy
Gortaganny	97	Tiaquin	Moylough	Mountbellew
Gortagarraun	479	Ballymoe	Clonbern	Tuam
Gortaghokera	229	Moycullen	Moycullen	Galway
Gortagowan	76	Dunkellin	Kilconierin	Loughrea
Gortaha	368	Longford	Lickmolassy	Portumna
Gortakeeran	219	Athenry	Kiltullagh	Loughrea
Gortaleam	343	Ballymoe	Dunmore	Glennamaddy
Gortaloman	78	Loughrea	Kilthomas	Loughrea
Gortalough	115	Longford	Abbeygormacan	Ballinasloe
Gortaloughane	22	Longford	Clonfert	Ballinasloe
Gortananny	152	Killian	Taghboy	Mountbellew
Gortaneare	59	Longford	Duniry	Loughrea
Gortanummera	199	Longford	Lickmolassy	Portumna
Gortard	378	Dunkellin	Stradbally	Galway
Gortard	88	Loughrea	Isertkelly	Loughrea
Gortarica	176	Clare	Kilkilvery	Tuam
Gortaroe	100	Dunkellin	Kilcolgan	Gort
Gortatleva	336	Dunkellin	Claregalway	Galway
Gortatleva	218	Galway	Rahoon	Galway
Gortavally	32	Tiaquin	Killosolan	Mountbellew
Gortavaura	55	Clare	Abbeyknockmoy	Galway
Gortavoher	270	Kiltartan	Beagh	Gort
Gortavoher	167	Longford	Killoran	Ballinasloe
Gortawullaun	183	Longford	Kilmalinoge	Portumna
Gortawullaun	112	Dunkellin	Kilconickny	Loughrea
Gortbeg	260	Clare	Kilmoylan	Tuam
Gortbeg	223	Clare	Killererin	Tuam
Gortbrack	199	Tiaquin	Ballymacward	Loughrea
Gortbrackmoor	135	Clonmacnowen	Ahascragh	Ballinasloe
Gortcam	110	Loughrea	Bullaun	Loughrea
Gortcloonmore	517	Clare	Claregalway	Galway
Gortdrishagh	88	Moycullen	Kilcummin	Oughterard
Gortdrishagh	80	Leitrim	Abbeygormacan	Loughrea
Gortdrishagh	54	Ballymoe	Templetogher	Glennamaddy
Gortduff	143	Ballymoe	Templetogher	Glennamaddy
Gorteen	900	Ballymoe	Dunmore	Glennamaddy
Gorteen	428	Tiaquin	Ballymacward	Loughrea
Gorteen	299	Ballymoe	Templetogher	Glennamaddy
Gorteen	150	Killian	Ballynakill	Mountbellew
Gorteen	96	Clonmacnowen	Kilcloony	Ballinasloe
Gorteenacra	60	Athenry	Athenry	Loughrea
Gorteenanillaun	231	Loughrea	Kilchreest	Loughrea
Gorteenaniska	148	Loughrea	Kilthomas	Gort
Gorteenapheebera	154	Loughrea	Loughrea	Loughrea
Gorteenaveela	229	Clonmacnowen	Clontuskert	Ballinasloe
Gorteenawillin	218	Kilconnell	Killallaghtan	Ballinasloe
Gorteenayanka	214	Leitrim	Ballynakill	Loughrea
Gorteenboy	420	Kiltartan	Kilbeacanty	Gort
Gorteencahill	88	Clonmacnowen	Clontuskert	Ballinasloe
Gorteendrishagh	118	Tiaquin	Moylough	Mountbellew
Gorteenfadda	238	Ballymoe	Kilbegnet	Glennamaddy
Gorteenlahard	128	Tiaquin	Moylough	Mountbellew
Gorteennabohogy	118	Loughrea	Loughrea	Loughrea
Gorteennaglogh	283	Ballynahinch	Ballynakill	Clifden
Gorteenphadder	264	Longford	Lickmolassy	Portumna
Gorteenruckaun	228	Killian	Athleague	Mountbellew
Gorteeny	1111	Leitrim	Ballynakill	Portumna
Gorterwulla	200	Moycullen	Kilcummin	Oughterard
Gortfadda	142	Kilconnell	Killaan	Ballinasloe
Gortgarrow	395	Ballymoe	Clonbern	Glennamaddy
Gortknappagh	127	Longford	Abbeygormacan	Ballinasloe
Gortlemon	78	Kilconnell	Killaan	Ballinasloe
Gortlusky	107	Longford	Lickmolassy	Portumna
Gortmore	543	Moycullen	Kilcummin	Oughterard
Gortmore	526	Ross	Ballinrobe	Ballinrobe
Gortmore	408	Moycullen	Killannin	Oughterard
Gortmore	173	Kilconnell	Killaan	Ballinasloe
Gortmore	136	Longford	Abbeygormacan	Ballinasloe
Gortmore	127	Clonmacnowen	Clontuskert	Ballinasloe
Gortmorris	215	Ballymoe	Kilbegnet	Glennamaddy
Gortnabarnaboy	14	Dunkellin	Kilconickny	Loughrea
Gortnaboha	172	Kilconnell	Killimordaly	Loughrea
Gortnaclassagh	78	Ross	Cong	Oughterard
Gortnaclassagh	25	Kiltartan	Kilbeacanty	Gort
Gortnacloghy	153	Longford	Lickmolassy	Portumna
Gortnacooheen	132	Longford	Lickmolassy	Portumna
Gortnacross	36	Tiaquin	Clonkeen	Loughrea
Gortnacullia	268	Kiltartan	Kilmacduagh	Gort
Gortnadeeve East	201	Ballymoe	Ballynakill	Glennamaddy
Gortnadeeve West	717	Ballymoe	Ballynakill	Glennamaddy
Gortnagier East	233	Ballymoe	Boyounagh	Glennamaddy
Gortnagier West	99	Ballymoe	Boyounagh	Glennamaddy
Gortnagleav	686	Loughrea	Killinan	Loughrea
Gortnaglogh	666	Kiltartan	Killinny	Gort
Gortnaglogh	262	Clonmacnowen	Kilgerrill	Ballinasloe
Gortnaglogh	81	Tiaquin	Moylough	Tuam
Gortnagoyne	689	Dunmore	Dunmore	Tuam
Gortnagroagh	128	Moycullen	Killannin	Oughterard
Gortnagunned	217	Dunmore	Addergoole	Tuam
Gortnahaskany	67	Tiaquin	Kilkerrin	Glennamaddy
Gortnahimrissan	58	Kilconnell	Killallaghtan	Ballinasloe
Gortnahoon	249	Kilconnell	Killallaghtan	Ballinasloe
Gortnahoon	217	Moycullen	Killannin	Oughterard
Gortnahorna. (or Clancarty)	240	Clonmacnowen	Clontuskert	Ballinasloe
Gortnahorna. (or Clanricarde)	448	Clonmacnowen	Clontuskert	Ballinasloe
Gortnahown	60	Athenry	Athenry	Loughrea
Gortnahultra	370	Tiaquin	Ballymacward	Loughrea
Gortnakilla	195	Longford	Donanaghta	Portumna
Gortnakilla	142	Leitrim	Ballynakill	Loughrea
Gortnalavey	155	Ballymoe	Kilbegnet	Glennamaddy
Gortnalea	473	Dunmore	Dunmore	Tuam
Gortnalecka	14	Galway	Rahoon	Galway
Gortnalone North	337	Tiaquin	Clonkeen	Loughrea
Gortnalone South	277	Tiaquin	Clonkeen	Loughrea
Gortnaloura	67	Dunmore	Addergoole	Tuam
Gortnalug	24	Longford	Kiltormer	Ballinasloe
Gortnamackan	153	Dunkellin	Kilchreest	Loughrea
Gortnamannagh East	413	Loughrea	Kilchreest	Loughrea
Gortnamannagh West	426	Loughrea	Kilchreest	Loughrea
Gortnamona	184	Clonmacnowen	Clontuskert	Ballinasloe
Gortnamona	169	Leitrim	Ballynakill	Loughrea
Gortnamona	58	Clare	Kilkilvery	Tuam
Gortnamona (or Moorfield)	460	Longford	Kilquain	Portumna
Gortnamona (or Moorfield)	109	Longford	Fahy	Portumna
Gortnamona East	85	Moycullen	Moycullen	Galway
Gortnamona West	95	Moycullen	Moycullen	Galway
Gortnanark	70	Loughrea	Kilthomas	Gort
Gortnandarragh (or Oakfield)	259	Moycullen	Killannin	Oughterard
Gortnaporia	253	Clare	Kilcoona	Tuam
Gortnaraheen	148	Longford	Kiltormer	Ballinasloe
Gortnarup	187	Ross	Cong	Oughterard
Gortnascreeny	301	Leitrim	Clonrush	Scarriff
Gortnasculloge	85	Clare	Donaghpatrick	Tuam
Gortnashingaun	69	Moycullen	Kilcummin	Oughterard
Gortnasillagh	171	Leitrim	Tynagh	Portumna
Gortnasteal	142	Kiltartan	Kilmacduagh	Gort
Gortnavea (or Deerfield)	57	Moycullen	Moycullen	Galway
Gortrea (or Fairfield)	279	Longford	Kilmalinoge	Portumna
Gortrevagh	222	Moycullen	Kilcummin	Oughterard
Gortroe	312	Clare	Annaghdown	Galway
Gortroe	124	Dunkellin	Kilcolgan	Gort
Gortroe	109	Athenry	Athenry	Loughrea
Gortronnagh	184	Tiaquin	Clonkeen	Loughrea
Gortrory (or Rogersfield)	52	Clare	Killeany	Tuam
Gortrummagh	283	Ballynahinch	Omey	Clifden
Gortsheela	19	Loughrea	Kilconickny	Loughrea
Gortskeagh	139	Kiltartan	Killinny	Gort
Gortstuckanagh	84	Kiltartan	Kilbeacanty	Gort
Gortyloughlin	332	Moycullen	Moycullen	Galway
Gortymadden	449	Longford	Abbeygormacan	Ballinasloe
Gortyneill	102	Longford	Kilmalinoge	Portumna
Gortyroyan East	119	Kilconnell	Ballymacward	Ballinasloe
Gortyroyan West	98	Kilconnell	Ballymacward	Ballinasloe
Gowil	120	Longford	Lickmolassy	Portumna
Gowla	3167	Ballynahinch	Moyrus	Clifden
Gowla	1107	Killian	Ahascragh	Mountbellew
Gowlan East	3042	Ballynahinch	Moyrus	Clifden
Gowlan West	768	Ballynahinch	Moyrus	Clifden
Gowlaun	1370	Ross	Ross	Oughterard
Gowlaun	275	Moycullen	Kilcummin	Oughterard
Gowlaunlee	1734	Ross	Ross	Oughterard
Graddoge	119	Clare	Killererin	Tuam
Graigabbey	4	Tiaquin	Monivea	Loughrea
Graigabbey South	346	Kilconnell	Monivea	Loughrea
Graigue	275	Loughrea	Loughrea	Loughrea
Graigue	196	Dunmore	Tuam	Tuam
Graigue	136	Tiaquin	Killoscobe	Mountbellew
Graigueachullaire	593	Dunmore	Dunmore	Tuam
Graigueagowan	293	Longford	Lickmolassy	Portumna
Graigueakilleen	243	Longford	Lickmolassy	Portumna
Graigueawoneen	311	Clonmacnowen	Clontuskert	Ballinasloe
Graiguebaun	350	Tiaquin	Monivea	Tuam
Graiguenavaddoge	245	Tiaquin	Killosolan	Mountbellew
Grallagh	248	Leitrim	Leitrim	Loughrea
Grallagh	160	Ballynahinch	Omey	Clifden
Grange	262	Clare	Annaghdown	Galway
Grange	260	Dunmore	Tuam	Tuam
Grange	254	Clare	Killererin	Tuam
Grange	243	Longford	Fahy	Portumna
Grange	220	Loughrea	Killeenadeema	Loughrea
Grange	210	Clonmacnowen	Kilcloony	Ballinasloe
Grange	188	Dunmore	Dunmore	Tuam
Grange	127	Kilconnell	Grange	Loughrea
Grange Beg	111	Leitrim	Duniry	Loughrea
Grange East	1831	Clare	Lackagh	Galway
Grange More	367	Leitrim	Duniry	Loughrea
Grange Park	65	Loughrea	Killeenadeema	Loughrea
Grange West	5	Clare	Lackagh	Galway
Grannagh	501	Loughrea	Ardrahan	Loughrea
Grannagh	162	Kiltartan	Kilthomas	Loughrea
Grannagh Beg	78	Loughrea	Ardrahan	Loughrea
Graveshill	228	Longford	Kiltormer	Ballinasloe
Great Island	49	Longford	Clonfert	Ballinasloe
Green Island	1	Kiltartan	Kinvarradoorus	Gort
Greenaun	548	Ross	Ballinrobe	Ballinrobe
Greeneenagh	71	Loughrea	Loughrea	Loughrea
Greenfield (or Shanbally)	199	Clare	Killursa	Tuam
Greenhills	392	Kilconnell	Ballymacward	Ballinasloe
Greenville	410	Tiaquin	Killosolan	Mountbellew
Greethill	248	Athenry	Athenry	Loughrea
Greeve Island	1	Ballynahinch	Moyrus	Clifden
Greyford	365	Athenry	Kiltullagh	Loughrea
Griggins	1513	Ross	Ross	Oughterard
Gunnode	632	Killian	Killian	Mountbellew
Gurlaun Island	1	Moycullen	Killannin	Oughterard
Gut Island	2	Leitrim	Ballynakill	Portumna
Gweeneeny	92	Leitrim	Clonrush	Scarriff
Halfcartron	339	Moycullen	Kilcummin	Oughterard
Halfmace	119	Ballynahinch	Moyrus	Clifden
Halfstraddle	81	Dunmore	Tuam	Tuam
Hampstead	547	Kilconnell	Ballymacward	Ballinasloe
Hardwood	139	Clonmacnowen	Aughrim	Ballinasloe
Hare Island	5	Galway	St. Nicholas	Galway
Hawthorn Island	1	Kiltartan	Kilbeacanty	Gort
Hazelfort	452	Kilconnell	Killallaghtan	Ballinasloe
**Headford**	Town	Clare	Killursa	Tuam
**Headford**	Town	Clare	Kilkilvery	Tuam
**Headford**	Town	Clare	Cargin	Tuam
Headford	142	Clare	Killursa	Tuam
Hearnsebrooke Demesne	83	Longford	Killimorbologue	Portumna
Heathlawn	718	Longford	Killimorbologue	Portumna
Hermitage	287	Killian	Killeroran	Mountbellew
Herringback Island	1	Longford	Kilmalinoge	Portumna
High Island	82	Ballynahinch	Omey	Clifden
Highfield	164	Kilconnell	Aughrim	Ballinasloe
Highfield	51	Kilconnell	Kilgerrill	Ballinasloe
Highpark	189	Kilconnell	Killaan	Loughrea
Highstreet	79	Tiaquin	Kilkerrin	Glennamaddy
Hillpark	54	Dunkellin	Stradbally	Galway
Hillsbrook Demesne	415	Clare	Killererin	Tuam
Hillswood	457	Kilconnell	Kilconnell	Ballinasloe
Hillswood east	481	Dunmore	Tuam	Tuam
Hillswood West	44	Dunmore	Tuam	Tuam
Hog Island	9	Ballynahinch	Omey	Clifden
Holly Island	1	Kiltartan	Kilbeacanty	Gort
Hollygrove	273	Killian	Athleague	Mountbellew
Hollymount	603	Loughrea	Kilthomas	Gort
Hollymount	59	Kiltartan	Beagh	Gort
Hollypark	133	Dunkellin	Kilconierin	Loughrea
Holy Island (or Inishcaltra)	45	Leitrim	Inishcaltra	Scarriff
Horse Island	13	Ballynahinch	Ballindoon	Clifden
Hundredacres	202	Tiaquin	Ballymacward	Mountbellew
Hundredacres	120	Tiaquin	Monivea	Tuam
Illananirey	1	Dunkellin	Killeenavarra	Gort
Illaun	302	Dunmore	Addergoole	Tuam
Illaunaconaun	26	Moycullen	Kilcummin	Oughterard
Illaunacroghaul	23	Ballynahinch	Moyrus	Clifden
Illaunacrusha	1	Dunkellin	Drumacoo	Gort
Illaunadroughearla	1	Longford	Meelick	Portumna
Illaunagawna	1	Ross	Cong	Oughterard
Illaunaglee	1	Longford	Meelick	Portumna
Illaunagoughal	1	Longford	Meelick	Portumna
Illaunagreasy	3	Moycullen	Killannin	Oughterard
Illaunaknick	1	Ross	Cong	Oughterard
Illaunaknock	3	Ballynahinch	Moyrus	Clifden
Illaunaleama	20	Ballynahinch	Ballindoon	Clifden
Illaunamenara	5	Ballynahinch	Ballindoon	Clifden
Illaunamid	29	Ballynahinch	Ballindoon	Clifden
Illaunanarrew	2	Ross	Cong	Oughterard
Illaunanarroor	2	Dunkellin	Kilcolgan	Gort
Illaunanbissan	1	Longford	Meelick	Portumna
Illaunane	11	Ballynahinch	Ballindoon	Clifden
Illaunaneel	13	Clare	Annaghdown	Galway
Illaunaneel West	2	Clare	Annaghdown	Galway
Illaunard	12	Ballynahinch	Moyrus	Clifden
Illaunatraghta	5	Moycullen	Killannin	Oughterard
Illaunaveel	5	Moycullen	Killannin	Oughterard
Illaunaveetry	1	Clare	Annaghdown	Galway
Illaunboy	2	Longford	Meelick	Portumna
Illauncarbry	4	Moycullen	Kilcummin	Oughterard
Illauncarbry	2	Clare	Cargin	Tuam
Illauncosheen	16	Moycullen	Kilcummin	Oughterard
Illauncurragilka	1	Moycullen	Killannin	Oughterard
Illaundarragh	2	Ross	Cong	Oughterard
Illaundaulaur	3	Ross	Cong	Oughterard
Illaundauvrack	1	Moycullen	Kilcummin	Oughterard
Illaundonoghrevy	3	Ross	Cong	Oughterard
Illauneeragh	89	Moycullen	Killannin	Oughterard
Illauneeragh West	77	Moycullen	Kilcummin	Oughterard
Illaunfadda	5	Moycullen	Killannin	Oughterard
Illaunfadda	2	Ballynahinch	Moyrus	Clifden
Illaunfadda Beg	5	Moycullen	Kilcummin	Oughterard
Illaunfadda More	10	Moycullen	Kilcummin	Oughterard
Illaungorm North	33	Ballynahinch	Moyrus	Clifden
Illaungorm South	12	Ballynahinch	Moyrus	Clifden
Illaungurraig	3	Ballynahinch	Moyrus	Clifden
Illaunhobert	5	Leitrim	Clonrush	Scarriff
Illaunkyle	2	Longford	Meelick	Portumna
Illaunleenagh	1	Moycullen	Killannin	Oughterard
Illaunmaan	1	Ballynahinch	Moyrus	Clifden
Illaunmahon	1	Moycullen	Moycullen	Galway
Illaunmore	212	Leitrim	Kilbarron	Scarriff
Illaunmore	95	Moycullen	Kilcummin	Oughterard
Illaunnaboolia	4	Moycullen	Killannin	Oughterard
Illaunnacroaghbeg	2	Ballynahinch	Moyrus	Clifden
Illaunnacroaghmore	12	Ballynahinch	Moyrus	Clifden
Illaunnafinnoge	1	Moycullen	Moycullen	Galway
Illaunnagappul	17	Moycullen	Kilcummin	Oughterard
Illaunnagappul	4	Moycullen	Kilcummin	Oughterard
Illaunnaginga	1	Moycullen	Kilcummin	Oughterard
Illaunnagower	3	Moycullen	Kilcummin	Oughterard
Illaunnaguroge	1	Kiltartan	Kinvarradoorus	Gort
Illaunnakirka	8	Ballynahinch	Moyrus	Clifden
Illaunnamoe	1	Longford	Lickmolassy	Portumna
Illaunnanownim	24	Moycullen	Killannin	Oughterard
Illaunnashinnagh	10	Moycullen	Moycullen	Galway
Illaunnaskeagh	6	Moycullen	Moycullen	Galway
Illaunord	1	Longford	Meelick	Portumna
Illaunribbeen	15	Ross	Cong	Oughterard
Illaunrie	2	Ross	Cong	Oughterard
Illaunroe	104	Clare	Cummer	Tuam
Illaunroe	9	Moycullen	Killannin	Oughterard
Illaunroe	8	Moycullen	Kilcummin	Oughterard
Illaunroe	1	Moycullen	Killannin	Oughterard
Illaunrossalough	2	Moycullen	Kilcummin	Oughterard
Illaunrush	2	Ballynahinch	Ballindoon	Clifden
Illaunurra	21	Ballynahinch	Ballindoon	Clifden
Illeny	1841	Moycullen	Kilcummin	Oughterard
Illion	477	Ballynahinch	Ballynakill	Clifden
Illion East	1531	Ballynahinch	Moyrus	Clifden
Illion West	662	Ballynahinch	Moyrus	Clifden
Inchaboy North	48	Kiltartan	Kilbeacanty	Gort
Inchaboy South	575	Kiltartan	Kilbeacanty	Gort
Inchacommaun Islands	6	Moycullen	Moycullen	Galway
Inchaghaun	28	Moycullen	Killannin	Oughterard
Inchagoill	80	Ross	Cong	Oughterard
Inchamakinna	108	Moycullen	Kilcummin	Oughterard
Inchamakinna	1	Moycullen	Kilcummin	Oughterard
Inchamore	208	Kiltartan	Kilthomas	Gort
Inchinaskeagh	9	Longford	Clonfert	Ballinasloe
Inchiquin	229	Clare	Killursa	Tuam
Inchy	161	Leitrim	Ballynakill	Loughrea
Inga (or Nail)	200	Longford	Killimorbologue	Portumna
Inish	69	Clare	Kilcoona	Tuam
Inishannagh	9	Ross	Cong	Oughterard
Inishbarna	19	Ballynahinch	Ballynakill	Clifden
Inishbarra	262	Moycullen	Killannin	Oughterard
Inishbeagh	3	Moycullen	Kilcummin	Oughterard
Inishbiana	8	Moycullen	Killannin	Oughterard
Inishbigger	8	Ballynahinch	Moyrus	Clifden
Inishbroon	12	Ballynahinch	Ballynakill	Clifden
Inishcaltra (or Holy Island)	45	Leitrim	Inishcaltra	Scarriff
Inishcash	8	Moycullen	Kilcummin	Oughterard
Inishconga	1	Ross	Cong	Oughterard
Inishcorra	42	Dunkellin	Ballynacourty	Galway
Inishdala	13	Leitrim	Ballynakill	Portumna
Inishdala	4	Leitrim	Ballynakill	Portumna
Inishdala	2	Leitrim	Ballynakill	Portumna
Inishdauwee	26	Ross	Cong	Oughterard
Inishdauwee	9	Moycullen	Kilcummin	Oughterard
Inishdawros	22	Ballynahinch	Ballindoon	Clifden
Inishdoorus	142	Ross	Cong	Oughterard
Inishdugga	42	Ballynahinch	Ballindoon	Clifden
Inishee	70	Longford	Clonfert	Ballinasloe
Inisheer	1400	Aran	Inisheer	Galway
Inisheltia	66	Moycullen	Kilcummin	Oughterard
Inisherk	64	Moycullen	Kilcummin	Oughterard
Inishflynn	2	Moycullen	Kilcummin	Oughterard
Inishgarraunbeg	3	Moycullen	Kilcummin	Oughterard
Inishgarraunmore	12	Moycullen	Kilcummin	Oughterard
Inishkeeragh	24	Ballynahinch	Ballindoon	Clifden
Inishlackan	129	Ballynahinch	Moyrus	Clifden
Inishlannaun	9	Moycullen	Kilcummin	Oughterard
Inishlay	21	Moycullen	Killannin	Oughterard
Inishlusk	12	Moycullen	Killannin	Oughterard
Inishmicatreer	203	Moycullen	Killannin	Oughterard
Inishmuskerry	18	Ballynahinch	Moyrus	Clifden
Inishnancan	4	Ross	Cong	Oughterard
Inishnee	856	Ballynahinch	Moyrus	Clifden
Inishool	10	Moycullen	Kilcummin	Oughterard
Inishroo	185	Kiltartan	Kinvarradoorus	Gort
Inishshaaboe	16	Moycullen	Kilcummin	Oughterard
Inishskehan	3	Clare	Killursa	Tuam
Inishthee	7	Ross	Cong	Oughterard
Inishtravin	190	Ballynahinch	Moyrus	Clifden
Inishtreh	10	Ballynahinch	Moyrus	Clifden
Inishtroghenmore	11	Ballynahinch	Moyrus	Clifden
Inishturk	132	Ballynahinch	Omey	Clifden
Inishule	6	Ballynahinch	Ballindoon	Clifden
Inishvinlush	2	Ross	Cong	Oughterard
Innplot	18	Dunkellin	Oranmore	Galway
Inveran	673	Moycullen	Killannin	Galway
Ironpool	450	Dunmore	Kilconla	Tuam
Isertkelly North	365	Loughrea	Isertkelly	Loughrea
Isertkelly South	350	Loughrea	Isertkelly	Loughrea
Island	124	Clare	Lackagh	Galway
Island	53	Kilconnell	Killimordaly	Loughrea
Island East	298	Ballymoe	Templetogher	Glennamaddy
Island Eddy	137	Dunkellin	Drumacoo	Galway
Island M'Coo	1	Loughrea	Killeenadeema	Loughrea
Island West	222	Ballymoe	Templetogher	Glennamaddy
Islandagu	2	Leitrim	Ballynakill	Portumna
Islandbeg	3	Ross	Ross	Oughterard
Islandmore	223	Clare	Lackagh	Galway
Islandmore	119	Kiltartan	Kilbeacanty	Gort
Islandmore	7	Ross	Ross	Oughterard
Islands	665	Killian	Killian	Mountbellew
Islands	95	Tiaquin	Killosolan	Mountbellew
Johnstown	119	Clare	Killower	Tuam
Joycegrove	154	Dunmore	Tuam	Tuam
Joyces Island	1	Ballynahinch	Moyrus	Clifden
Joyces Park	70	Clare	Donaghpatrick	Tuam
Kanargad	6	Loughrea	Kilconickny	Loughrea
Kanrawer	70	Ballynahinch	Ballynakill	Clifden
Kead	450	Ballymoe	Clonbern	Glennamaddy
Keaghery Island	1	Kiltartan	Beagh	Gort
Keamsellagh East	217	Dunkellin	Killeenavarra	Gort
Keamsellagh West	233	Dunkellin	Killeenavarra	Gort
Keave	94	Kilconnell	Ahascragh	Mountbellew
Keeagh	599	Moycullen	Moycullen	Galway
Keekill	435	Clare	Killeany	Tuam
Keelderry	1088	Loughrea	Kilthomas	Gort
Keelkyle	1006	Ballynahinch	Ballynakill	Clifden
Keeloge	236	Longford	Meelick	Portumna
Keeloges	98	Dunmore	Tuam	Tuam
Keeloges	83	Kilconnell	Ahascragh	Mountbellew
Keeloges East	941	Ballymoe	Ballynakill	Glennamaddy
Keeloges West	525	Ballymoe	Ballynakill	Glennamaddy
Keelogesbeg	185	Ballymoe	Ballynakill	Glennamaddy
Keenaghan	143	Longford	Clonfert	Portumna
Keeraun	134	Galway	Rahoon	Galway
Keeraunbeg	708	Moycullen	Killannin	Oughterard
Keeraunnagark North	918	Moycullen	Killannin	Galway
Keeraunnagark South	702	Moycullen	Killannin	Galway
Keerhaun North	100	Ballynahinch	Ballindoon	Clifden
Keerhaun South	185	Ballynahinch	Ballindoon	Clifden
Keerhaunmore	163	Ballynahinch	Ballindoon	Clifden
Keernaun	486	Clare	Killeany	Tuam
Kelly's Island	2	Ross	Cong	Oughterard
Kellysgrove	1753	Clonmacnowen	Clontuskert	Ballinasloe
Kentfield	144	Galway	Rahoon	Galway
Kentstown	98	Killian	Killian	Mountbellew
Kilbeacanty	223	Kiltartan	Kilbeacanty	Gort
Kilbeg	995	Loughrea	Killinan	Loughrea
Kilbeg	752	Ballymoe	Templetogher	Glennamaddy
Kilbeg	348	Longford	Abbeygormacan	Ballinasloe
Kilbeg	266	Tiaquin	Moylough	Tuam
Kilbeg	217	Clare	Cargin	Tuam
Kilbeg Lower	148	Ross	Ross	Oughterard
Kilbeg Upper	328	Ross	Ross	Oughterard
Kilbegnet	400	Ballymoe	Kilbegnet	Roscommon
Kilbegnet	29	Ballymoe	Dunamon	Roscommon
Kilboght	218	Leitrim	Kilreekill	Loughrea
Kilbrickan	520	Moycullen	Kilcummin	Oughterard
Kilbride	1963	Ross	Ross	Ballinrobe
Kilbride	236	Leitrim	Abbeygormacan	Loughrea
Kilcahill	429	Clare	Annaghdown	Tuam
Kilcaimin	36	Dunkellin	Ballynacourty	Galway
Kilcarrooraun	294	Loughrea	Kilthomas	Gort
**Kilchreest**	Town	Dunkellin	Kilchreest	Loughrea
Kilchreest	267	Dunkellin	Kilchreest	Loughrea
Kilcloggaun	189	Moycullen	Moycullen	Galway
Kilclogh	422	Killian	Killian	Mountbellew
Kilcloghans	367	Dunmore	Tuam	Tuam
Kilcloony	1259	Clonmacnowen	Kilcloony	Ballinasloe
Kilcloony	302	Dunmore	Liskeevy	Tuam
Kilcloony	61	Dunmore	Tuam	Tuam
Kilcolgan	231	Dunkellin	Kilcolgan	Gort
Kilcolumb	427	Ballymoe	Ballynakill	Glennamaddy
Kilcommadan	448	Clonmacnowen	Aughrim	Ballinasloe
Kilconierin	91	Dunkellin	Kilconierin	Loughrea
**Kilconnell**	Town	Kilconnell	Kilconnell	Ballinasloe
Kilcooley	376	Ballymoe	Kilcroan	Glennamaddy
Kilcooly	414	Leitrim	Kilcooly	Loughrea
Kilcoona	169	Clare	Kilcoona	Tuam
Kilcooney	131	Leitrim	Clonrush	Scarriff
Kilcoosh	381	Killian	Killian	Mountbellew
Kilcorban	208	Leitrim	Tynagh	Portumna
Kilcorkey	34	Galway	Rahoon	Galway
Kilcornan	814	Dunkellin	Stradbally	Galway
Kilcornan	414	Kilconnell	Monivea	Loughrea
Kilcornan	187	Tiaquin	Kilkerrin	Glennamaddy
Kilcreevanty	1581	Dunmore	Kilbennan	Tuam
Kilcrimple	340	Kiltartan	Kilbeacanty	Gort
Kilcrin	129	Killian	Ahascragh	Ballinasloe
Kilcrow	215	Longford	Killimorbologue	Portumna
Kilcurriv Eighter	409	Clare	Cummer	Tuam
Kilcurrivard	610	Clare	Cummer	Tuam
Kildaree	370	Ballymoe	Templetogher	Glennamaddy
Kildaree	161	Clare	Killursa	Tuam
Kildrum	193	Clare	Donaghpatrick	Tuam
Kilfelligy	83	Tiaquin	Killoscobe	Mountbellew
Kilgarriff	283	Clare	Kilcoona	Tuam
Kilgarriff North	214	Ballymoe	Tuam	Tuam
Kilgarriff South	77	Ballymoe	Tuam	Tuam
Kilgarve North	315	Tiaquin	Abbeyknockmoy	Tuam
Kilgarve South	57	Tiaquin	Abbeyknockmoy	Tuam
Kilgerrill	186	Clonmacnowen	Kilgerrill	Ballinasloe
Kilgevrin	767	Dunmore	Liskeevy	Tuam
Kilgill	311	Clare	Annaghdown	Tuam
Kilglass	465	Clonmacnowen	Ahascragh	Mountbellew
Kilhonerush (or Woodlands)	116	Longford	Meelick	Portumna
Kilkerrin	234	Tiaquin	Kilkerrin	Glennamaddy
Kilkieran	2255	Ballynahinch	Moyrus	Clifden
Kilkilvery	189	Clare	Kilkilvery	Tuam
Kilkittaun	224	Leitrim	Clonrush	Scarriff
Kill	416	Longford	Kiltormer	Ballinasloe
Kill	325	Longford	Tiranascragh	Portumna
Kill	289	Ballynahinch	Ballindoon	Clifden
Kill	274	Ballynahinch	Omey	Clifden
Kill	120	Clonmacnowen	Clontuskert	Ballinasloe
Killaan	345	Kilconnell	Killaan	Ballinasloe
Killachunna	525	Longford	Kilquain	Portumna
Killaclogher	695	Tiaquin	Monivea	Tuam
Killaderry	590	Killian	Taghboy	Mountbellew
Killadullisk	382	Longford	Kilquain	Portumna
Killafeen	157	Kiltartan	Kilbeacanty	Gort
Killagh Beg	429	Kilconnell	Killallaghtan	Ballinasloe
Killagh More	1016	Kilconnell	Killallaghtan	Ballinasloe
Killaghaun	209	Tiaquin	Ballymacward	Mountbellew
Killagoola	883	Moycullen	Moycullen	Galway
Killaguile	1062	Moycullen	Killannin	Oughterard
Killallaghtan	95	Clonmacnowen	Killallaghtan	Ballinasloe
Killaloonty	428	Clare	Tuam	Tuam
Killaltanagh	374	Longford	Clonfert	Ballinasloe
Killamanagh	128	Clare	Donaghpatrick	Tuam
Killamude East	273	Tiaquin	Ballymacward	Mountbellew
Killamude West	62	Tiaquin	Ballymacward	Mountbellew
Killannin	410	Moycullen	Killannin	Oughterard
Killarainy	213	Moycullen	Moycullen	Galway
Killareeny	168	Kilconnell	Aughrim	Ballinasloe
Killarriv	411	Athenry	Kiltullagh	Loughrea
Killascaul	293	Athenry	Kiltullagh	Loughrea
Killasmuggaun	281	Tiaquin	Kilkerrin	Glennamaddy
Killaspugmoylan	188	Dunkellin	Kilconickny	Loughrea
Killateeaun	211	Ross	Ballinrobe	Ballinrobe
Killavoher	954	Ballymoe	Dunmore	Glennamaddy
Killeany	2188	Aran	Inishmore	Galway
**Killeany Town**	Town	Aran	Inishmore	Galway
Killederdaowen	67	Leitrim	Duniry	Portumna
Killeelaun	437	Clare	Tuam	Tuam
Killeely Beg	288	Dunkellin	Killeely	Gort
Killeely More	278	Dunkellin	Killeely	Gort
Killeen	462	Kiltartan	Beagh	Gort
Killeen	429	Ballynahinch	Moyrus	Clifden
Killeen	269	Leitrim	Leitrim	Loughrea
Killeen	203	Kilconnell	Ahascragh	Mountbellew
Killeen	125	Galway	Oranmore	Galway
Killeen	118	Clonmacnowen	Kilcloony	Ballinasloe
Killeen	111	Dunmore	Tuam	Tuam
Killeen	86	Galway	Rahoon	Galway
Killeen East	98	Longford	Killimorbologue	Portumna
Killeen North	252	Leitrim	Tynagh	Portumna
Killeen South	178	Leitrim	Tynagh	Portumna
Killeen West	52	Longford	Killimorbologue	Portumna
Killeenadeema West	770	Loughrea	Killeenadeema	Loughrea
Killeenan Beg	81	Dunmore	Tuam	Tuam
Killeenan More	282	Dunmore	Tuam	Tuam
Killeenaran	211	Dunkellin	Drumacoo	Gort
Killeenavarra	116	Dunkellin	Killeenavarra	Gort
Killeeneen Beg	217	Dunkellin	Killeeneen	Gort
Killeeneen More	735	Dunkellin	Killeeneen	Gort
Killeenhugh	275	Dunkellin	Killeenavarra	Gort
Killeenmunterland South	150	Dunkellin	Kilcolgan	Gort
Killeenmunterlane North	173	Dunkellin	Kilcolgan	Gort
Killeenpatrick	71	Loughrea	Isertkelly	Loughrea
Killeen's Island	1	Longford	Meelick	Portumna
Killeighter	166	Clare	Killererin	Tuam
Killenadeema East	310	Loughrea	Killeenadeema	Loughrea
Killeragh	188	Longford	Clonfert	Ballinasloe
Killerneen	138	Dunmore	Addergoole	Tuam
Killeroran	839	Killian	Killeroran	Mountbellew
Killescragh	309	Athenry	Killimordaly	Loughrea
Killevny	455	Longford	Clonfert	Ballinasloe
Killian	333	Killian	Killian	Mountbellew
Killiane	196	Longford	Killimorbologue	Portumna
Killimor	697	Kilconnell	Killimordaly	Loughrea
Killimor and Boleybeg	105	Longford	Killimorbologue	Portumna
**Killimor Town**	Town	Longford	Killimorbologue	Portumna
Killinny East	266	Kiltartan	Killinny	Gort
Killinny West	533	Kiltartan	Killinny	Gort
Killogilleen	93	Dunkellin	Killogilleen	Loughrea
Killola	193	Moycullen	Killannin	Oughterard
Killomoran	266	Kiltartan	Kilmacduagh	Gort
Killooaun	302	Tiaquin	Clonkeen	Mountbellew
Killooaun	106	Tiaquin	Ballymacward	Mountbellew
Killooaun (Browne)	128	Tiaquin	Ballymacward	Mountbellew
Killooaun (Eyre)	403	Tiaquin	Ballymacward	Mountbellew
Killora	172	Dunkellin	Killora	Loughrea
Killoran	642	Longford	Killoran	Ballinasloe
Killoran	125	Longford	Clonfert	Ballinasloe
Killoscobe	109	Tiaquin	Killoscobe	Mountbellew
Killosolan	1799	Tiaquin	Killosolan	Mountbellew
Killough	786	Moycullen	Moycullen	Galway
Killower	315	Clare	Killower	Tuam
Killuney	635	Ballymoe	Dunmore	Glennamaddy
Killuppaun (or Clonbrock)	259	Clonmacnowen	Ahascragh	Ballinasloe
Killuppaun (or Mahon)	50	Clonmacnowen	Ahascragh	Ballinasloe
Killure Beg	441	Clonmacnowen	Kilgerrill	Ballinasloe
Killure Castle	636	Clonmacnowen	Kilgerrill	Ballinasloe
Killure More	1249	Clonmacnowen	Kilgerrill	Ballinasloe
Killymongaun	491	Ballynahinch	Moyrus	Clifden
Kilmacduagh	237	Kiltartan	Kilmacduagh	Gort
Kilmachugh	336	Longford	Meelick	Portumna
Kilmacrah	329	Leitrim	Leitrim	Loughrea
Kilmacrickard	376	Ballymoe	Ballynakill	Glennamaddy
Kilmacshane (Macklin)	272	Longford	Clonfert	Ballinasloe
Kilmacshane (Turbett)	2167	Longford	Clonfert	Ballinasloe
Kilmalaw	559	Clonmacnowen	Kilgerrill	Ballinasloe
Kilmalinoge	215	Longford	Kilmalinoge	Portumna
Kilmeelickin	475	Ross	Ross	Oughterard
Kilmeen	699	Leitrim	Kilmeen	Loughrea
Kilmore	1324	Killian	Killeroran	Mountbellew
Kilmore	474	Dunmore	Killererin	Tuam
Kilmore	442	Ballymoe	Templetogher	Glennamaddy
Kilmore	440	Clare	Tuam	Tuam
Kilmore	349	Longford	Killimorbologue	Portumna
Kilmore	194	Ross	Ross	Ballinrobe
Kilmurry	313	Ballymoe	Clonbern	Tuam
Kilmurry	113	Longford	Tynagh	Portumna
Kilmurry	63	Clare	Cargin	Tuam
Kilmurry	9	Dunkellin	Kilconickny	Loughrea
Kilmurvy	1769	Aran	Inishmore	Galway
Kilnaborris	382	Longford	Clonfert	Ballinasloe
Kilnagappagh	445	Loughrea	Killinan	Loughrea
Kilnahown	136	Clonmacnowen	Clontuskert	Ballinasloe
Kilnalag	214	Ballymoe	Templetogher	Glennamaddy
Kilnalappa	351	Ballymoe	Dunmore	Glennamaddy
Kilnamullaun	168	Longford	Killimorbologue	Portumna
Kilnamullaun	31	Longford	Abbeygormacan	Ballinasloe
Kilnaslieve	329	Dunmore	Dunmore	Tuam
Kilphrasoga	307	Dunmore	Liskeevy	Tuam
Kilquain	373	Longford	Kilquain	Portumna
Kilquain	220	Dunkellin	Killora	Loughrea
Kilrateera Lower	146	Leitrim	Inishcaltra	Scarriff
Kilrateera Upper	335	Leitrim	Inishcaltra	Scarriff
Kilroe	83	Clare	Kilcoona	Tuam
Kilroe East	822	Moycullen	Killannin	Galway
Kilroe West	910	Moycullen	Killannin	Galway
Kilroghter	345	Galway	Oranmore	Galway
**Kilronan**	Town	Aran	Inishmore	Galway
Kilsallagh	951	Ballymoe	Kilcroan	Glennamaddy
Kilshanvy	1266	Dunmore	Kilconla	Tuam
Kilskeagh	576	Clare	Athenry	Galway
Kiltartan	104	Kiltartan	Kiltartan	Gort
Kiltiernan East	486	Dunkellin	Kilcolgan	Gort
Kiltiernan West	198	Dunkellin	Kilcolgan	Gort
Kiltivna	191	Ballymoe	Dunmore	Glennamaddy
**Kiltormer**	Town	Longford	Kiltormer	Ballinasloe
Kiltormer East	406	Longford	Kiltormer	Ballinasloe
Kiltormer West	196	Longford	Kiltormer	Ballinasloe
Kiltrasna	291	Clare	Killeany	Tuam
Kiltroge	446	Clare	Lackagh	Galway
Kiltroge	98	Clare	Claregalway	Galway
Kiltullagh	952	Dunkellin	Oranmore	Galway
Kiltullagh	696	Tiaquin	Kilkerrin	Glennamaddy
Kiltullagh North	590	Athenry	Kiltullagh	Loughrea
Kiltullagh South	107	Athenry	Kiltullagh	Loughrea
Kiltybannan	184	Ballymoe	Templetogher	Glennamaddy
Kilwullaun	196	Clare	Donaghpatrick	Tuam
Kimmeenmore	43	Galway	Rahoon	Galway
Kinclare	471	Tiaquin	Killosolan	Mountbellew
Kincullia	442	Loughrea	Loughrea	Loughrea
Kingsland North	90	Athenry	Athenry	Loughrea
Kingsland South	236	Athenry	Athenry	Loughrea
Kingstown Glebe (or Ballymaconry)	78	Ballynahinch	Omey	Clifden
Kinincha	103	Kiltartan	Kiltartan	Gort
Kiniska	505	Clare	Claregalway	Galway
Kinmona North	147	Dunkellin	Ardrahan	Gort
Kinmona South	108	Dunkellin	Ardrahan	Gort
Kinnakinelly	693	Dunmore	Addergoole	Tuam
Kinnaveelish	33	Kilconnell	Aughrim	Ballinasloe
Kinnelly Islands	4	Ballynahinch	Moyrus	Clifden
Kinreask	259	Tiaquin	Ballymacward	Ballinasloe
**Kinvarra**	Town	Kiltartan	Kinvarradoorus	Gort
Kinvarra	1086	Moycullen	Kilcummin	Oughterard
Kinvarra	338	Kiltartan	Kinvarradoorus	Gort
Kippaunagh	273	Ballymoe	Dunmore	Glennamaddy
Knavagh	32	Longford	Tiranascragh	Portumna
Knock	956	Moycullen	Moycullen	Galway
Knock	302	Moycullen	Killannin	Oughterard
Knock	203	Clare	Killererin	Tuam
Knock	46	Ballynahinch	Ballindoon	Clifden
Knock North	84	Moycullen	Killannin	Oughterard
Knock South	605	Moycullen	Killannin	Galway
Knockaboy	77	Tiaquin	Clonkeen	Loughrea
Knockacarrigeen	288	Clare	Belclare	Tuam
Knockadaumore	249	Dunkellin	Kilconickny	Loughrea
Knockadav	4595	Moycullen	Kilcummin	Oughterard
Knockadikeen	286	Loughrea	Loughrea	Loughrea
Knockadoagh	643	Moycullen	Killannin	Galway
Knockadrum	140	Leitrim	Ballynakill	Loughrea
Knockakilleen	153	Kiltartan	Kinvarradoorus	Gort
Knockalough	1121	Moycullen	Moycullen	Galway
Knockaloura East	216	Dunmore	Tuam	Tuam
Knockaloura West	215	Dunmore	Tuam	Tuam
Knockanarra	308	Ballymoe	Templetogher	Glennamaddy
Knockanavoddy	191	Moycullen	Rahoon	Galway
Knockanima	117	Loughrea	Loughrea	Loughrea
Knockaphort	119	Leitrim	Inishcaltra	Scarriff
Knockaphreaghaun	996	Moycullen	Kilcummin	Oughterard
Knockarasser	814	Moycullen	Moycullen	Galway
Knockash	164	Loughrea	Kilteskill	Loughrea
Knockatee East	194	Dunmore	Dunmore	Tuam
Knockatee West	286	Dunmore	Dunmore	Tuam
Knockatober (or Pollboy)	268	Tiaquin	Monivea	Tuam
Knockatogher	679	Athenry	Kiltullagh	Loughrea
Knockatoo	251	Kiltartan	Beagh	Gort
Knockatoo Mountain	95	Kiltartan	Beagh	Gort
Knockatoor	126	Dunkellin	Killeeneen	Loughrea
Knockaun	246	Longford	Abbeygormacan	Ballinasloe
Knockaun	132	Leitrim	Ballynakill	Loughrea
Knockaunarainy	158	Killian	Athleague	Mountbellew
Knockaunatouk	238	Kiltartan	Kilmacduagh	Gort
Knockaunawadda	53	Kiltartan	Kilbeacanty	Gort
Knockaunbaun	1234	Ross	Ross	Oughterard
Knockaunbaun	100	Leitrim	Kilteskill	Loughrea
Knockaunbaun	87	Leitrim	Ballynakill	Loughrea
Knockaunbrack	345	Ballymoe	Dunmore	Glennamaddy
Knockauncarragh	732	Leitrim	Ballynakill	Loughrea
Knockauncarragh	370	Tiaquin	Monivea	Tuam
Knockauncoura	132	Loughrea	Kilconickny	Loughrea
Knockauncoura	123	Kiltartan	Kilmacduagh	Gort
Knockauncoura	28	Loughrea	Loughrea	Loughrea
Knockaundarragh	326	Leitrim	Ballynakill	Loughrea
Knockauneevin and Ballywatteen	367	Longford	Tynagh	Portumna
Knockaunglass	29	Athenry	Athenry	Loughrea
Knockaunkeel	33	Dunmore	Addergoole	Tuam
Knockaunnacarragh	113	Galway	Rahoon	Galway
Knockaunnagat	232	Dunmore	Dunmore	Tuam
Knockaunnageeha	131	Ballymoe	Templetogher	Glennamaddy
Knockaunnakirkeen	34	Leitrim	Ballynakill	Loughrea
Knockaunranny	1356	Moycullen	Moycullen	Galway
Knockaunroe	107	Killian	Ahascragh	Ballinasloe
Knockauns East	219	Ballymoe	Boyounagh	Glennamaddy
Knockauns West	357	Ballymoe	Boyounagh	Glennamaddy
Knockavally	202	Ballynahinch	Omey	Clifden
Knockavanny	173	Dunmore	Tuam	Tuam
Knockavilla	256	Tiaquin	Killoscobe	Mountbellew
Knockavilra (or Fountainhill)	143	Ballynahinch	Omey	Clifden
Knockawuddy	67	Dunkellin	Ballynacourty	Galway
Knockballyclery	83	Dunkellin	Killeenavarra	Gort
Knockballyvishteal	741	Dunmore	Dunmore	Tuam
Knockbane	214	Moycullen	Moycullen	Galway
Knockbaron	278	Leitrim	Kilmeen	Loughrea
Knockbaun	214	Athenry	Athenry	Galway
Knockbaun	99	Ballynahinch	Omey	Clifden
Knockbaun	77	Moycullen	Kilcummin	Oughterard
Knockbaun	51	Loughrea	Killeenadeema	Loughrea
Knockboy	914	Ballynahinch	Moyrus	Clifden
Knockbrack	665	Tiaquin	Monivea	Loughrea
Knockbrack	195	Ballynahinch	Omey	Clifden
Knockbrack	83	Leitrim	Tynagh	Portumna
Knockbrack	34	Kilconnell	Killaan	Ballinasloe
Knockcorrandoo	215	Tiaquin	Moylough	Tuam
Knockdoebeg East	261	Clare	Lackagh	Galway
Knockdoebeg West	554	Clare	Lackagh	Galway
Knockdoemore	330	Clare	Lackagh	Galway
Knockdoemore	269	Clare	Claregalway	Galway
Knockdrummore	54	Leitrim	Ballynakill	Loughrea
Knockereen	160	Clare	Kilcoona	Tuam
**Knockgarra**	Town	Kiltartan	Kinvarradoorus	Gort
Knockglass	58	Clonmacnowen	Kilcloony	Ballinasloe
Knockkillaree	90	Moycullen	Kilcummin	Oughterard
Knocklawrence	245	Kiltartan	Beagh	Gort
Knockmascahill	564	Ballymoe	Ballynakill	Glennamaddy
Knockmore	125	Kilconnell	Killaan	Ballinasloe
Knockmoyle East	626	Leitrim	Ballynakill	Loughrea
Knockmoyle West	371	Leitrim	Ballynakill	Loughrea
Knocknaboley	63	Kilconnell	Grange	Loughrea
Knocknacarragh	134	Galway	Rahoon	Galway
Knocknacreeva	228	Clare	Athenry	Galway
Knocknadaula	252	Athenry	Kiltullagh	Loughrea
Knocknadaula	117	Athenry	Killimordaly	Loughrea
Knocknagappagh	88	Kilconnell	Killallaghtan	Ballinasloe
Knocknagarrivhan	839	Moycullen	Kilcummin	Oughterard
Knocknagreana	240	Moycullen	Rahoon	Galway
Knocknagreana	17	Clonmacnowen	Kilcloony	Ballinasloe
Knocknahaw	72	Ballynahinch	Ballynakill	Clifden
Knocknamanaugh	41	Dunkellin	Killogilleen	Loughrea
Knockogonnell	451	Ballymoe	Kilcroan	Glennamaddy
Knockoura	845	Loughrea	Kilthomas	Gort
Knockouran	262	Kiltartan	Kilbeacanty	Gort
Knockranny	1748	Moycullen	Moycullen	Galway
Knockroe	502	Kilconnell	Killimordaly	Loughrea
Knockroe	290	Kiltartan	Kilbeacanty	Gort
Knockroe	288	Ballymoe	Clonbern	Tuam
Knockroe	277	Dunkellin	Kilconickny	Loughrea
Knockroe	197	Clonmacnowen	Kilclooney	Ballinasloe
Knockroe	184	Loughrea	Killeenadeema	Loughrea
Knockroe	48	Leitrim	Ballynakill	Loughrea
Knockroebeg	19	Dunkellin	Kilconickny	Loughrea
Knockshanbally	298	Moycullen	Moycullen	Galway
Knockshangarry	59	Leitrim	Kilmeen	Loughrea
Knockshangarry	59	Loughrea	Loughrea	Loughrea
Knocktoby	191	Kiltartan	Beagh	Gort
Kylagowan	328	Leitrim	Ballynakill	Loughrea
Kyleaglannawood	164	Leitrim	Ballynakill	Loughrea
Kylebeg	199	Leitrim	Tynagh	Loughrea
Kylebrack	6	Leitrim	Duniry	Loughrea
Kylebrack East	370	Leitrim	Leitrim	Loughrea
Kylebrack West	372	Leitrim	Leitrim	Loughrea
Kylebroghlan	307	Moycullen	Moycullen	Galway
Kyleegan	132	Leitrim	Duniry	Portumna
Kylegarriff	97	Loughrea	Killeenadeema	Loughrea
Kylemore	5034	Ballynahinch	Ballynakill	Clifden
Kylemore	1411	Longford	Clonfert	Ballinasloe
Kylemore	513	Leitrim	Ballynakill	Portumna
Kylemore	454	Moycullen	Killannin	Oughterard
Kylenagappa	157	Leitrim	Ballynakill	Loughrea
Kylenamelly	403	Leitrim	Ballynakill	Portumna
Kylesalia	1484	Ballynahinch	Moyrus	Clifden
Lack	177	Dunmore	Addergoole	Tuam
Lackabaun	182	Leitrim	Duniry	Portumna
Lackabaun	167	Dunkellin	Kilchreest	Loughrea
Lackabaun	99	Dunkellin	Killinan	Loughrea
Lackafinna North	77	Loughrea	Kilconickny	Loughrea
Lackafinna South	321	Loughrea	Kilconickny	Loughrea
Lackagh	83	Kilconnell	Killallaghtan	Ballinasloe
Lackagh More	550	Clare	Lackagh	Galway
Lackalea	725	Loughrea	Kilconickny	Loughrea
Lackan	378	Leitrim	Ballynakill	Portumna
Lackan	173	Dunkellin	Ardrahan	Gort
Lackanroe	99	Clare	Kilmoylan	Tuam
Lackavrea	1656	Moycullen	Kilcummin	Oughterard
Lacklea	48	Galway	Rahoon	Galway
Laggoo	912	Leitrim	Ballynakill	Loughrea
Laghanabba	207	Ballynahinch	Omey	Clifden
Laghtgannon	186	Moycullen	Killannin	Oughterard
Laghtgeorge	31	Clare	Claregalway	Galway
Laghtonora	129	Tiaquin	Monivea	Loughrea
Laghtphilip	193	Dunkellin	Killeeneen	Gort
Laghtyshaughnessy	312	Kiltartan	Beagh	Gort
Lahacrogher	126	Killian	Killian	Mountbellew
Lahaghglass North	53	Ballymoe	Kilbegnet	Glennamaddy
Lahaghglass South	118	Ballymoe	Kilbegnet	Glennamaddy
Lahardaun	541	Kiltartan	Kilbeacanty	Gort
Lahardaun	61	Dunkellin	Ballynacourty	Galway
Lahardaun	47	Dunkellin	Killinan	Loughrea
Lakefield	191	Clonmacnowen	Clontuskert	Ballinasloe
Lakeview	353	Dunkellin	Claregalway	Galway
Lakyle	186	Leitrim	Clonrush	Scarriff
Lakyle	87	Dunkellin	Killogilleen	Loughrea
Lambhill	25	Dunmore	Tuam	Tuam
Lambs Island	1	Kiltartan	Kinvarradoorus	Gort
Laragh	644	Kilconnell	Killimordaly	Loughrea
Laragh Beg	413	Clare	Abbeyknockmoy	Galway
Laragh More	700	Clare	Abbeyknockmoy	Galway
Largan	602	Clare	Donaghpatrick	Tuam
Larraga	206	Leitrim	Ballynakill	Loughrea
Larragan	273	Moycullen	Killannin	Oughterard
Lattoon	843	Kilconnell	Ahascragh	Mountbellew
Laughil	1155	Moycullen	Moycullen	Galway
Laughil	347	Kiltartan	Beagh	Gort
Laughil	205	Ballymoe	Clonbern	Glennamaddy
Laughil	138	Tiaquin	Moylough	Mountbellew
Laughil	105	Leitrim	Ballynakill	Loughrea
Laughil	97	Dunkellin	Lickerrig	Loughrea
Laughil	82	Longford	Killimorbologue	Portumna
Laurclavagh	412	Clare	Cummer	Tuam
**Laurencetown**	Town	Longford	Clonfert	Ballinasloe
Laurencetown	26	Longford	Clonfert	Ballinasloe
Lavagh	182	Kilconnell	Killallaghtan	Ballinasloe
Lavally	410	Dunkellin	Killeely	Gort
Lavally	208	Kiltartan	Kiltartan	Gort
Lavally	133	Kiltartan	Beagh	Gort
Lavallyconor	125	Dunkellin	Killeely	Gort
Leagaun	403	Moycullen	Moycullen	Galway
Leagaun	122	Ballynahinch	Omey	Clifden
Leagh North	233	Kiltartan	Kinvarradoorus	Gort
Leagh South	408	Kiltartan	Kinvarradoorus	Gort
Leaghcarrick	211	Ballynahinch	Ballindoon	Clifden
Leaha	662	Ballymoe	Kilbegnet	Glennamaddy
Lealetter	551	Moycullen	Moycullen	Galway
Leam East	1910	Moycullen	Kilcummin	Oughterard
Leam West	2348	Moycullen	Kilcummin	Oughterard
Leamcon	184	Leitrim	Kilteskill	Loughrea
Lecarrow	602	Ross	Ross	Oughterard
Lecarrow	416	Tiaquin	Moylough	Tuam
Lecarrow	173	Longford	Tynagh	Portumna
Lecarrow	162	Longford	Lickmolassy	Portumna
Lecarrow	150	Dunkellin	Lickerrig	Loughrea
Lecarrow	119	Kilconnell	Killosolan	Mountbellew
Lecarrow	92	Dunkellin	Killora	Loughrea
Lecarrow	78	Dunkellin	Killeeneen	Loughrea
Lecarrow	3	Leitrim	Kilmeen	Loughrea
Lecarrow North	119	Leitrim	Ballynakill	Loughrea
Lecarrow South	131	Leitrim	Ballynakill	Loughrea
Lecarrowmactully	165	Kilconnell	Kilconnell	Ballinasloe
Lecarrowmore	47	Clare	Claregalway	Galway
Lecarrownagappoge	139	Leitrim	Kilreekill	Loughrea
Lecarrowntruhaun	105	Kilconnell	Grange	Loughrea
Lecknabegga	105	Loughrea	Kilthomas	Loughrea
Lecknavarna	1275	Ballynahinch	Ballynakill	Clifden
Lee	769	Ross	Ross	Oughterard
Leenaun	1845	Ross	Ross	Oughterard
Lee's Island	47	Moycullen	Killannin	Oughterard
Lehanagh	414	Tiaquin	Killosolan	Mountbellew
Lehanagh North	662	Ballynahinch	Moyrus	Clifden
Lehanagh South	922	Ballynahinch	Moyrus	Clifden
Lehid	350	Dunmore	Kilbennan	Tuam
Lehid	190	Ballynahinch	Ballindoon	Clifden
Lehinch	202	Tiaquin	Kilkerrin	Glennamaddy
Lehinch	59	Longford	Clonfert	Ballinasloe
Lehurick	155	Tiaquin	Kilkerrin	Glennamaddy
Leighon Island	10	Moycullen	Killannin	Oughterard
Leitrim Beg	258	Leitrim	Leitrim	Loughrea
Leitrim More	286	Leitrim	Leitrim	Loughrea
Lemnaheltia	736	Ballynahinch	Ballynakill	Clifden
Lemonfield	388	Moycullen	Kilcummin	Oughterard
Lenabower	38	Galway	Rahoon	Galway
Lenaboy	101	Ballymoe	Clonbern	Glennamaddy
Lenaboy	52	Galway	Rahoon	Galway
Lenafin	338	Clonmacnowen	Kilgerrill	Ballinasloe
Lenaloughra	124	Kilconnell	Fohanagh	Mountbellew
Lenamore	950	Tiaquin	Monivea	Loughrea
Lenamore	238	Kilconnell	Killimordaly	Loughrea
Lenamore	130	Dunmore	Tuam	Tuam
Lenamore	65	Longford	Clonfert	Ballinasloe
Lenanmarla	286	Ballymoe	Kilbegnet	Glennamaddy
Lenareagh	364	Tiaquin	Clonkeen	Loughrea
Lenareagh	128	Tiaquin	Killimordaly	Loughrea
Lenarevagh	102	Ballymoe	Kilbegnet	Glennamaddy
Lenarevagh	101	Galway	Rahoon	Galway
Lerhin	279	Ballymoe	Clonbern	Glennamaddy
Letter	1692	Moycullen	Killannin	Galway
Letter Beg	231	Ballynahinch	Ballynakill	Clifden
Letter More	236	Ballynahinch	Ballynakill	Clifden
Lettera	434	Ballymoe	Clonbern	Glennamaddy
Lettera	261	Ballymoe	Templetogher	Glennamaddy
Lettera (or Crossaun)	86	Clare	Killursa	Tuam
Letteragh	117	Galway	Rahoon	Galway
Letterard	840	Ballynahinch	Moyrus	Clifden
Letterbreckaun	1610	Ballynahinch	Ballynakill	Clifden
Letterbrickaun	451	Ross	Ross	Oughterard
Lettercallow	1245	Moycullen	Killannin	Oughterard
Lettercaunius	351	Ballynahinch	Moyrus	Clifden
Lettercraff	1374	Moycullen	Kilcummin	Oughterard
Lettercraffroe	1154	Moycullen	Kilcummin	Oughterard
Letterdeen	278	Ballynahinch	Omey	Clifden
Letterdeskert	282	Ballynahinch	Moyrus	Clifden
Letterdife	1590	Ballynahinch	Moyrus	Clifden
Lettereeneen	1235	Ross	Ballinrobe	Ballinrobe
Letterettrin	399	Ballynahinch	Ballynakill	Clifden
Letterfir	2296	Moycullen	Killannin	Galway
Letterfore	2274	Moycullen	Kilcummin	Oughterard
Letterfrack	1239	Ballynahinch	Ballynakill	Clifden
Lettergesh East	2180	Ballynahinch	Ballynakill	Clifden
Lettergesh West	1186	Ballynahinch	Ballynakill	Clifden
Lettergunnet	852	Moycullen	Rahoon	Galway
Letterkeeghaun	433	Moycullen	Kilcummin	Oughterard
Lettermas	846	Moycullen	Moycullen	Galway
Lettermore	1259	Moycullen	Kilcummin	Oughterard
Lettermore	1008	Moycullen	Killannin	Oughterard
Lettermuckoo	2496	Moycullen	Kilcummin	Oughterard
Lettermullan	787	Moycullen	Kilcummin	Oughterard
Letternoosh	397	Ballynahinch	Omey	Clifden
Letterpeak	595	Moycullen	Moycullen	Galway
Letterpibrum	607	Ballynahinch	Moyrus	Clifden
Lettershanbally	1382	Ballynahinch	Ballynakill	Clifden
Lettershanna	189	Ballynahinch	Omey	Clifden
Lettershea	629	Ballynahinch	Moyrus	Clifden
Lettershinna	4396	Ballynahinch	Moyrus	Clifden
Lettery	951	Ballynahinch	Moyrus	Clifden
Levally	110	Clare	Belclare	Tuam
Levally East	392	Ballymoe	Tuam	Tuam
Levally West	230	Ballymoe	Tuam	Tuam
Levallynearl (or Foats)	224	Kilconnell	Aughrim	Ballinasloe
Lickerrig	265	Dunkellin	Lickerrig	Loughrea
Lickmolassy	109	Longford	Lickmolassy	Portumna
Limehill	653	Leitrim	Duniry	Loughrea
Limepark North	258	Kiltartan	Kilthomas	Loughrea
Limepark South	86	Loughrea	Kilthomas	Loughrea
Lindsay's Farm	107	Tiaquin	Abbeyknockmoy	Tuam
Lippa	388	Moycullen	Moycullen	Galway
Lisbeg	353	Longford	Clonfert	Ballinasloe
Lisbrine	735	Kiltartan	Kilbeacanty	Gort
Liscananaun	951	Clare	Lackagh	Galway
Liscappul	121	Clonmacnowen	Kilcloony	Ballinasloe
Liscloonmeeltoge	165	Killian	Moylough	Mountbellew
Lisconly	61	Dunmore	Tuam	Tuam
Liscoyle	517	Longford	Abbeygormacan	Ballinasloe
Liscuill	640	Killian	Killian	Mountbellew
Liscune Lower	362	Kilconnell	Ballymacward	Ballinasloe
Liscune Upper	291	Kilconnell	Ballymacward	Ballinasloe
Lisdeligny	656	Longford	Killimorbologue	Portumna
Lisdonagh	258	Clare	Donaghpatrick	Tuam
Lisdonnellroe	130	Kilconnell	Kilconnell	Ballinasloe
Lisdooaun	318	Longford	Donanaghta	Portumna
Lisdoran	72	Tiaquin	Monivea	Loughrea
Lisduff	304	Dunmore	Dunmore	Tuam
Lisduff	264	Longford	Tynagh	Portumna
Lisduff	211	Loughrea	Loughrea	Loughrea
Lisduff	204	Kilconnell	Killimordaly	Loughrea
Lisduff	104	Ballymoe	Kilbegnet	Roscommon
Lisduff South	80	Leitrim	Tynagh	Portumna
Lisduneen	23	Longford	Tiranascragh	Portumna
Lisdurra	91	Leitrim	Ballynakill	Loughrea
Lisfinny	192	Longford	Donanaghta	Portumna
Lisgar	98	Longford	Clonfert	Ballinasloe
Lisgub (Ward)	46	Tiaquin	Ballymacward	Mountbellew
Lisgub East	473	Kilconnell	Ballymacward	Mountbellew
Lisgub West	112	Tiaquin	Ballymacward	Mountbellew
Lisheen	414	Kiltartan	Kilmacduagh	Gort
Lisheen	128	Tiaquin	Ballymacward	Mountbellew
Lisheen North	75	Leitrim	Duniry	Loughrea
Lisheen South	71	Leitrim	Duniry	Loughrea
Lisheenaclara	82	Loughrea	Kilteskill	Loughrea
Lisheenacrannagh	182	Kiltartan	Kilmacduagh	Gort
Lisheenaguile	319	Longford	Kiltormer	Ballinasloe
Lisheenahevnia	111	Leitrim	Abbeygormacan	Loughrea
Lisheenakeeran	47	Galway	Rahoon	Galway
Lisheenaleen	365	Leitrim	Kilteskill	Loughrea
Lisheenanoran	686	Clare	Annaghdown	Galway
Lisheenavalla	546	Clare	Lackagh	Galway
Lisheeneenaun East	156	Dunkellin	Killeenavarra	Gort
Lisheeneenaun West	243	Dunkellin	Killeenavarra	Gort
Lisheeneynaun	115	Loughrea	Ardrahan	Loughrea
Lisheenkyle East	174	Clare	Athenry	Galway
Lisheenkyle West	514	Clare	Athenry	Galway
Lisheennagat	69	Leitrim	Duniry	Portumna
Lisheennageeha	324	Clare	Killeany	Tuam
Lisheennaheltia	1090	Ballymoe	Boyounagh	Glennamaddy
Lisheennavannoge (Blake)	44	Clonmacnowen	Clontuskert	Ballinasloe
Lisheennavannoge (Clancarty)	78	Clonmacnowen	Clontuskert	Ballinasloe
Lisheenteige	230	Killian	Killeroran	Mountbellew
Lisheeny	81	Leitrim	Ballynakill	Loughrea
Liskea	211	Ballymoe	Templetogher	Glennamaddy
Liskeevy	619	Dunmore	Liskeevy	Tuam
Liskelly	205	Clonmacnowen	Clontuskert	Ballinasloe
Liskevin	126	Dunkellin	Kilcolgan	Gort
Lislea	302	Kilconnell	Killosolan	Mountbellew
Lisloughlin	581	Tiaquin	Ballymacward	Mountbellew
Lismacteige	162	Longford	Abbeygormacan	Ballinasloe
Lismafadda	101	Longford	Meelick	Portumna
Lismanny	1938	Longford	Clontuskert	Ballinasloe
Lismihil	208	Longford	Killimorbologue	Portumna
Lismoes	190	Tiaquin	Killoscobe	Mountbellew
Lismore Demesne	465	Longford	Clonfert	Ballinasloe
Lismoylan	138	Dunkellin	Killinan	Loughrea
Lismoyle	210	Tiaquin	Killoscobe	Mountbellew
Lismoyle	42	Kiltartan	Kilbeacanty	Gort
Lisnaclassagh	162	Kilconnell	Killosolan	Mountbellew
Lisnadrisha	256	Dunkellin	Kilconierin	Loughrea
Lisnageeragh	594	Ballymoe	Ballynakill	Glennamaddy
Lisnageeragh	188	Ballymoe	Kilcroan	Glennamaddy
Lisnagloos	74	Dunkellin	Killora	Loughrea
Lisnagranshy	182	Dunkellin	Kilcolgan	Gort
Lisnagree	217	Tiaquin	Killosolan	Mountbellew
Lisnagry	341	Leitrim	Leitrim	Loughrea
Lisnagyreeny	141	Kiltartan	Kilmacduagh	Gort
Lisnaminaun	263	Clare	Killererin	Tuam
Lisnamoltaun	351	Kilconnell	Killaan	Ballinasloe
Lisnascreena	275	Kilconnell	Fohanagh	Mountbellew
Lispheasty	118	Longford	Clonfert	Ballinasloe
Lisrabirra	43	Kiltartan	Kiltartan	Gort
Lisrivis	446	Ballymoe	Templetogher	Glennamaddy
Liss	486	Tiaquin	Abbeyknockmoy	Tuam
Liss	416	Clare	Killeany	Tuam
Liss	309	Leitrim	Ballynakill	Loughrea
Lissacarha	263	Tiaquin	Kilkerrin	Glennamaddy
Lissacullaun	109	Kilconnell	Killallaghtan	Ballinasloe
Lissacullaun	45	Longford	Killoran	Ballinasloe
Lissadoill	211	Loughrea	Kilthomas	Gort
Lissadulta	131	Kiltartan	Kilthomas	Gort
Lissagurraun	157	Moycullen	Moycullen	Galway
Lissaleen	227	Dunmore	Kilbennan	Tuam
Lissalondoon	115	Dunkellin	Kilconierin	Loughrea
Lissalumma	170	Leitrim	Abbeygormacan	Loughrea
Lissanacody	507	Longford	Donanaghta	Portumna
Lissananny	618	Dunmore	Kilbennan	Tuam
Lissanard East	228	Leitrim	Tynagh	Portumna
Lissanard West	67	Leitrim	Tynagh	Portumna
Lissaniska	211	Tiaquin	Abbeyknockmoy	Tuam
Lissaniska	148	Leitrim	Ballynakill	Loughrea
Lissaniska North	408	Longford	Killimorbologue	Portumna
Lissaniska South	630	Longford	Killimorbologue	Portumna
Lissapharson	83	Longford	Kiltormer	Ballinasloe
Lissaphuca	194	Leitrim	Kilmeen	Loughrea
Lissard	245	Kilconnell	Kilconnell	Ballinasloe
Lissareaghaun (or Belview)	969	Longford	Kiltormer	Ballinasloe
Lissarulla	365	Dunkellin	Claregalway	Galway
Lissatunny	151	Kiltartan	Kiltartan	Gort
Lissavahaun	171	Clonmacnowen	Aughrim	Ballinasloe
Lissavally	189	Clare	Killererin	Tuam
Lissavally (Jackson)	258	Dunmore	Tuam	Tuam
Lissavally (Vesey)	195	Dunmore	Tuam	Tuam
Lissavally Glebe	85	Clare	Killererin	Tuam
Lissavruggy	516	Killian	Killian	Mountbellew
Lissawullaun	186	Clonmacnowen	Killallaghtan	Ballinasloe
Lissindragan	90	Dunkellin	Killora	Loughrea
Lissoughter	1386	Ballynahinch	Moyrus	Clifden
Lissybroder	379	Dunmore	Dunmore	Tuam
Lissyconor	337	Ballymoe	Dunmore	Glennamaddy
Lissyegan (Hodson)	453	Killian	Ahascragh	Ballinasloe
Lissyegan (Mahon)	169	Killian	Ahascragh	Ballinasloe
Lobinish	1	Moycullen	Killannin	Oughterard
Lodge	107	Clare	Kilkilvery	Tuam
Lomaunaghbaun	342	Ballymoe	Clonbern	Tuam
Lomaunaghroe	375	Ballymoe	Clonbern	Tuam
Long Island	1	Longford	Meelick	Portumna
Long Island North	1	Clare	Cargin	Tuam
Longford	930	Longford	Tiranascragh	Portumna
Longford	334	Killian	Ballynakill	Mountbellew
Loobroe	49	Athenry	Athenry	Loughrea
Loonaghtan (Kelly)	94	Killian	Ahascragh	Mountbellew
Loonaghtan (Mahon)	194	Killian	Ahascragh	Mountbellew
Looscaun	363	Leitrim	Ballynakill	Portumna
Lord Fitzgerald's Island	1	Dunkellin	Oranmore	Galway
Loughaclerybeg	155	Kilconnell	Kilconnell	Ballinasloe
Loughaconeera	1434	Ballynahinch	Moyrus	Clifden
Loughanspark	17	Clare	Belclare	Tuam
Loughatorick North	3193	Leitrim	Ballynakill	Loughrea
Loughatorick South	2949	Leitrim	Ballynakill	Loughrea
Loughaun	42	Loughrea	Kilteskill	Loughrea
Loughaun Beg	1762	Moycullen	Killannin	Galway
Loughaun Island	2	Dunkellin	Kilcolgan	Gort
Loughauna	1050	Ballynahinch	Omey	Clifden
Loughaunawadda	145	Kiltartan	Kilthomas	Gort
Loughaunboy	130	Kilconnell	Killosolan	Mountbellew
Loughaunbrean	191	Kilconnell	Kilconnell	Ballinasloe
Loughaunbrean	68	Clonmacnowen	Clontuskert	Ballinasloe
Loughaunenaghan	136	Athenry	Athenry	Galway
Loughaunnavaag	147	Kilconnell	Killallaghtan	Ballinasloe
Loughaunroe East	246	Leitrim	Tynagh	Portumna
Loughaunroe West	79	Leitrim	Tynagh	Portumna
Loughawee	1100	Ballynahinch	Moyrus	Clifden
Loughbown	299	Clonmacnowen	Kilcloony	Ballinasloe
Loughburke	19	Loughrea	Killinan	Loughrea
Loughcooter Demesne	884	Kiltartan	Beagh	Gort
Loughcurra North	287	Kiltartan	Kinvarradoorus	Gort
Loughcurra South	336	Kiltartan	Kinvarradoorus	Gort
Loughinch	77	Galway	Rahoon	Galway
Loughpark	292	Ballymoe	Boyounagh	Glennamaddy
Loughpark	115	Leitrim	Ballynakill	Loughrea
Loughpark	86	Dunmore	Tuam	Tuam
**Loughrea**	Town	Loughrea	Loughrea	Loughrea
Loughrea	163	Loughrea	Loughrea	Loughrea
Loughturk East	33	Clonmacnowen	Clontuskert	Ballinasloe
Loughturk West	130	Clonmacnowen	Clontuskert	Ballinasloe
Lowpark	372	Longford	Killoran	Ballinasloe
Lowville	1555	Kilconnell	Fohanagh	Ballinasloe
Luggakeeraun	564	Moycullen	Killannin	Oughterard
Lugganaffrin	652	Moycullen	Kilcummin	Oughterard
Lugganimma	1139	Moycullen	Kilcummin	Oughterard
Luggatarriff	526	Ballynahinch	Ballynakill	Clifden
Luggawannia	253	Clare	Cargin	Tuam
Lughanagh	100	Kilconnell	Killosolan	Mountbellew
Luimnagh East	121	Clare	Kilcoona	Tuam
Luimnagh West	234	Clare	Kilcoona	Tuam
Lurga	166	Kiltartan	Beagh	Gort
Lurgabaun	122	Kiltartan	Kilbeacanty	Gort
Lurgan	639	Kilconnell	Killosolan	Mountbellew
Lurgan	315	Dunmore	Dunmore	Tuam
Lurgan	245	Dunmore	Addergoole	Tuam
Lurgan	226	Kiltartan	Kilbeacanty	Gort
Lurgan	131	Dunkellin	Kilconickny	Loughrea
Lurgan (or Shindilla)	1121	Moycullen	Kilcummin	Oughterard
Lurgan Beg	113	Longford	Abbeygormacan	Ballinasloe
Lurgan Great	302	Clonmacnowen	Killallaghtan	Ballinasloe
Lurgan Little	217	Clonmacnowen	Killallaghtan	Ballinasloe
Lurgan More	640	Longford	Abbeygormacan	Ballinasloe
Lurganshanny	90	Longford	Abbeygormacan	Ballinasloe
Lyalbeg	5	Ballynahinch	Ballindoon	Clifden
Lyalmore	14	Ballynahinch	Ballindoon	Clifden
Lydacan	852	Dunkellin	Claregalway	Galway
Lydacan	213	Kiltartan	Ardrahan	Gort
Mace	430	Clare	Annaghdown	Galway
Mace	251	Ballynahinch	Moyrus	Clifden
Mackney	198	Clonmacnowen	Kilcloony	Ballinasloe
Mackney (Clancarty)	282	Clonmacnowen	Clontuskert	Ballinasloe
Mackney (Kelly)	102	Clonmacnowen	Clontuskert	Ballinasloe
Maghera Beg	218	Moycullen	Kilcummin	Oughterard
Maghera More	929	Moycullen	Kilcummin	Oughterard
Magheramore	374	Longford	Killimorbologue	Portumna
Magheranearla	289	Longford	Tiranascragh	Portumna
Magherareagh	358	Leitrim	Inishcaltra	Scarriff
Mahanagh	222	Ballymoe	Clonbern	Tuam
Mahanagh	210	Clare	Cummer	Tuam
Mallyree	110	Killian	Athleague	Mountbellew
Malthooa	5	Ballynahinch	Omey	Clifden
Mannin	251	Dunkellin	Ardrahan	Loughrea
Mannin Beg	326	Ballynahinch	Ballindoon	Clifden
Mannin More	578	Ballynahinch	Ballindoon	Clifden
Manninard	215	Dunkellin	Ardrahan	Loughrea
Manuslynn	537	Clare	Kilcoona	Tuam
Marblehill	503	Leitrim	Ballynakill	Loughrea
Marganure	250	Tiaquin	Kilkerrin	Glennamaddy
Marlay	465	Tiaquin	Moylough	Mountbellew
Marley	97	Dunmore	Tuam	Tuam
Marnellsgrove	328	Ballymoe	Kilcroan	Glennamaddy
Marshallspark	26	Dunkellin	Ballynacourty	Galway
Masmore	106	Dunmore	Tuam	Tuam
Mason Island	92	Ballynahinch	Moyrus	Clifden
Masonbrook	298	Loughrea	Kilteskill	Loughrea
Maum	304	Ballynahinch	Ballindoon	Clifden
Maum East	481	Ross	Ross	Oughterard
Maum West	355	Ross	Ross	Oughterard
Maumeen	3510	Moycullen	Killannin	Oughterard
Maumfin	107	Ballynahinch	Ballynakill	Clifden
Maumgawnagh	725	Ross	Ross	Oughterard
Maumtrasna	1648	Ross	Ross	Ballinrobe
Mausrevagh	378	Clare	Kilcoona	Tuam
Maw	424	Ballynahinch	Omey	Clifden
Meanus	147	Leitrim	Kilreekill	Loughrea
Meelick	591	Tiaquin	Boyounagh	Glennamaddy
Meelick	443	Leitrim	Clonrush	Scarriff
Meelick	416	Longford	Meelick	Portumna
Meelick	240	Tiaquin	Killosolan	Mountbellew
Meelick East	127	Dunmore	Tuam	Tuam
Meelick West	137	Dunmore	Tuam	Tuam
Meelickbeg	154	Ballymoe	Clonbern	Tuam
Meelickmore	264	Ballymoe	Dunmore	Tuam
Meenalena	252	Dunmore	Dunmore	Tuam
Meeneen	358	Longford	Fahy	Portumna
Meheranspark	178	Loughrea	Isertkelly	Loughrea
**Menlough**	Town	Galway	Oranmore	Galway
Menlough	921	Galway	Oranmore	Galway
Menlough Commons	223	Tiaquin	Killoscobe	Mountbellew
Menlough Eighter	476	Tiaquin	Killoscobe	Mountbellew
Menlough Oughter	303	Tiaquin	Killoscobe	Mountbellew
Menus	152	Dunmore	Dunmore	Tuam
Menus Park	99	Dunmore	Dunmore	Tuam
Merlinpark	323	Galway	Oranmore	Galway
Middle Island	4	Moycullen	Killannin	Oughterard
Middleline North	467	Leitrim	Inishcaltra	Scarriff
Middleline South	214	Leitrim	Inishcaltra	Scarriff
Milestone	1	Galway	St. Nicholas	Galway
Millford	250	Ballymoe	Kilbegnet	Glennamaddy
Millpark	63	Athenry	Athenry	Loughrea
Millpark	37	Longford	Meelick	Portumna
Millpark	14	Ballymoe	Kilbegnet	Glennamaddy
Millpark	9	Ross	Ross	Oughterard
Millplot	4	Dunkellin	Oranmore	Galway
Milltown	439	Tiaquin	Kilkerrin	Glennamaddy
Milltown	102	Dunmore	Addergoole	Tuam
Mincloon	170	Galway	Rahoon	Galway
Minna	903	Moycullen	Kilcummin	Galway
Mira	512	Clare	Athenry	Galway
Mirehill	307	Clare	Donaghpatrick	Tuam
Moanbaun	603	Athenry	Athenry	Loughrea
Moanmore	184	Loughrea	Kilteskill	Loughrea
Moanmore East	198	Loughrea	Loughrea	Loughrea
Moanmore West	152	Loughrea	Loughrea	Loughrea
Moannakeeba East	457	Leitrim	Tynagh	Portumna
Moannakeeba West	477	Leitrim	Tynagh	Portumna
Moat	649	Tiaquin	Moylough	Glennamaddy
Moat	454	Ballymoe	Kilbegnet	Glennamaddy
Moat	238	Kilconnell	Aughrim	Ballinasloe
Moat	208	Longford	Killimorbologue	Portumna
Moaty	218	Longford	Kiltormer	Ballinasloe
Moaty	191	Longford	Clonfert	Ballinasloe
Moher	211	Tiaquin	Abbeyknockmoy	Tuam
Moher	154	Clonmacnowen	Kilcloony	Ballinasloe
Monacow	228	Dunmore	Tuam	Tuam
Monagormly	367	Tiaquin	Kilkerrin	Glennamaddy
Monairmore	126	Tiaquin	Kilkerrin	Glennamaddy
Monambraher	90	Kilconnell	Kilconnell	Ballinasloe
Monard	116	Clare	Lackagh	Galway
Monasternalea (or Abbeygrey)	157	Killian	Killeroran	Mountbellew
Monasterowen	185	Ballymoe	Templetogher	Glennamaddy
Monasteruales (or Abbeygrey)	503	Killian	Athleague	Mountbellew
Monearmore	53	Loughrea	Loughrea	Loughrea
Monearmore	9	Loughrea	Kilconickny	Loughrea
Moneen	522	Tiaquin	Killoscobe	Mountbellew
Moneen	292	Ballymoe	Templetogher	Glennamaddy
Moneen	125	Clare	Cummer	Tuam
Moneen	85	Tiaquin	Ballymacward	Mountbellew
Moneen	81	Ballymoe	Ballynakill	Glennamaddy
Moneen East	325	Loughrea	Ardrahan	Loughrea
Moneen WEst	113	Loughrea	Ardrahan	Loughrea
Moneenaheeltia	92	Longford	Clonfert	Ballinasloe
Moneenally	285	Ballymoe	Templetogher	Glennamaddy
Moneenaveena	94	Longford	Killimorbologue	Portumna
Moneenmore	660	Ross	Cong	Oughterard
Moneenpollagh	38	Dunmore	Dunmore	Tuam
Moneenroe	161	Ballymoe	Kilbegnet	Glennamaddy
Moneyduff	74	Dunkellin	Oranmore	Galway
Moneymore East	622	Dunkellin	Oranmore	Galway
Moneymore West	324	Dunkellin	Oranmore	Galway
Moneyscreebagh (or Mountscribe)	465	Kiltartan	Kinvarradoorus	Gort
Moneyteige	471	Dunkellin	Killeeneen	Loughrea
Moneyveen	746	Kilconnell	Kilconnell	Ballinasloe
**Monivea**	Town	Tiaquin	Monivea	Tuam
Monivea Demesne	924	Tiaquin	Monivea	Tuam
Monksfield	519	Dunkellin	Killogilleen	Loughrea
Monpelier	305	Athenry	Athenry	Galway
Monroe	315	Clare	Lackagh	Galway
Montaigh South	331	Dunkellin	Claregalway	Galway
Montiagh North	454	Clare	Claregalway	Galway
Monumentpark	125	Dunmore	Tuam	Tuam
Moor	658	Clare	Athenry	Galway
Moor	107	Leitrim	Duniry	Portumna
Moor Island	2	Moycullen	Kilcummin	Oughterard
Moor Island	1	Moycullen	Kilcummin	Oughterard
Moorfield	567	Ballymoe	Templetogher	Glennamaddy
Moorfield	211	Longford	Fahy	Portumna
Moorfield (or Gortnamona)	460	Longford	Kilquain	Portumna
Moorfield (or Gortnamona)	109	Longford	Fahy	Portumna
Moorneen	276	Ballynahinch	Omey	Clifden
Morgan's Island	1	Kiltartan	Kinvarradoorus	Gort
Mountain	81	Kilconnell	Killallaghtan	Ballinasloe
Mountain	66	Clonmacnowen	Ahascragh	Ballinasloe
Mountain North	220	Athenry	Athenry	Galway
Mountain South	177	Athenry	Athenry	Loughrea
Mountain West	198	Dunkellin	Athenry	Galway
Mountainpark	171	Leitrim	Ballynakill	Loughrea
**Mountbellew**	Town	Killian	Moylough	Mountbellew
Mountbellew Demesne	480	Killian	Moylough	Mountbellew
Mountbellew Demesne	73	Killian	Ballynakill	Mountbellew
Mountbernard	109	Tiaquin	Ballymacward	Mountbellew
Mountborwne	294	Clare	Abbeyknockmoy	Galway
Mountgarret	173	Tiaquin	Monivea	Loughrea
Mounthazel	422	Tiaquin	Ballymacward	Mountbellew
Mountkelly	457	Ballymoe	Boyounagh	Glennamaddy
Mountpleasant	154	Loughrea	Loughrea	Loughrea
Mountpotter	93	Dunmore	Tuam	Tuam
Mountross	416	Clare	Killeany	Tuam
Mountscribe (or Moneyscreebagh)	465	Kiltartan	Kinvarradoorus	Gort
**Mountshannon**	Town	Leitrim	Inishcaltra	Scarriff
Mountshannon	255	Leitrim	Inishcaltra	Scarriff
Mountsilk	106	Tiaquin	Moylough	Mountbellew
Mountventure	76	Tiaquin	Ballymacward	Ballinasloe
Moy	270	Kiltartan	Kinvarradoorus	Gort
Moyard	1172	Ballynahinch	Ballynakill	Clifden
Moyarwood	728	Kilconnell	Ballymacward	Ballinasloe
Moycola	160	Dunkellin	Killogilleen	Loughrea
Moycullen	426	Moycullen	Moycullen	Galway
Moyglass	878	Leitrim	Ballynakill	Loughrea
Moyleen	360	Loughrea	Loughrea	Loughrea
Moylough	68	Tiaquin	Moylough	Mountbellew
Moylough Beg	351	Tiaquin	Moylough	Mountbellew
Moylough More	524	Tiaquin	Moylough	Mountbellew
Moyne	536	Tiaquin	Abbeyknockmoy	Tuam
Moyode	824	Athenry	Kilconierin	Loughrea
Moyode Demesne	599	Athenry	Kilconierin	Loughrea
Moyower	314	Longford	Meelick	Portumna
Moyrus	1313	Ballynahinch	Moyrus	Clifden
Moyure	43	Tiaquin	Ballymacward	Mountbellew
Moyveela	893	Dunkellin	Athenry	Galway
Moyveela	500	Dunkellin	Stradbally	Galway
Moyvoon East	81	Moycullen	Kilcummin	Oughterard
Moyvoon West	60	Moycullen	Kilcummin	Oughterard
Muckanagh	373	Longford	Fahy	Portumna
Muckanagh North	624	Killian	Killeroran	Mountbellew
Muckanagh South	346	Killian	Killeroran	Mountbellew
Muckanaghederdauhaulia	470	Moycullen	Kilcummin	Oughterard
Muckanaghkillew	1238	Moycullen	Kilcummin	Oughterard
Muckcoort	648	Clare	Killeany	Tuam
Muckloon	905	Killian	Taghboy	Mountbellew
Muckrush	303	Clare	Annaghdown	Galway
Muggaunagh	145	Dunkellin	Kilcolgan	Gort
Muing	146	Longford	Clonfert	Ballinasloe
Muingbaun	661	Longford	Kilquain	Portumna
Mullagh	536	Dunmore	Kilbennan	Tuam
Mullagh Beg	183	Longford	Abbeygormacan	Ballinasloe
Mullagh More	394	Longford	Abbeygormacan	Ballinasloe
Mullaghadrum	35	Clare	Annaghdown	Galway
Mullaghglass	874	Ballynahinch	Ballynakill	Clifden
Mullaghmarkagh	66	Dunmore	Dunmore	Tuam
Mullaghmore East	824	Tiaquin	Moylough	Mountbellew
Mullaghmore North	238	Tiaquin	Moylough	Mountbellew
Mullaghmore South	443	Tiaquin	Moylough	Mountbellew
Mullaghmore West	496	Tiaquin	Moylough	Mountbellew
Mullaghruttery	180	Clare	Claregalway	Galway
Mulpit	181	Athenry	Athenry	Loughrea
Mulroney's Island	6	Kiltartan	Kinvarradoorus	Gort
Mulroog East	378	Dunkellin	Kilcolgan	Gort
Mulroog West	400	Dunkellin	Kilcolgan	Gort
Munga	902	Ballynahinch	Ballindoon	Clifden
Munterowen East	744	Ross	Ross	Oughterard
Munterowen Middle	531	Ross	Ross	Oughterard
Munterowen West	265	Ross	Ross	Oughterard
Murragh	9	Longford	Meelick	Portumna
Murrooogh	245	Galway	Oranmore	Galway
Murvagh Island	4	Moycullen	Killannin	Oughterard
Murvey	1087	Ballynahinch	Moyrus	Clifden
Mutton Island	4	Galway	Rahoon	Galway
Mutton Island	1	Ballynahinch	Moyrus	Clifden
Mweelin	652	Ballynahinch	Ballynakill	Clifden
Mweeloon	221	Dunkellin	Ballynacourty	Galway
Mweenish Island	572	Ballynahinch	Moyrus	Clifden
Mweenish Island	53	Dunkellin	Ballynacourty	Galway
Mweenisharan	13	Dunkellin	Drumacoo	Gort
Mylespark	115	Clare	Cummer	Tuam
Nail (or Inga)	200	Longford	Killimorbologue	Portumna
Needle Island (or Snahadaun)	1	Moycullen	Kilcummin	Oughterard
Newbridge	200	Killian	Killian	Mountbellew
Newcastle	611	Kilconnell	Aughrim	Ballinasloe
Newcastle	512	Galway	Rahoon	Galway
Newcastle	232	Tiaquin	Kilkerrin	Glennamaddy
Newcastle	218	Tiaquin	Monivea	Loughrea
Newcastle	136	Kilconnell	Killallaghtan	Ballinasloe
Newford	219	Athenry	Athenry	Loughrea
Newforest	995	Tiaquin	Kilkerrin	Glennamaddy
Newgarden (or Pollaturk)	425	Clare	Belclare	Tuam
Newgrove	619	Leitrim	Kilreekill	Loughrea
Newgrove	154	Killian	Killian	Mountbellew
Newhall	168	Kiltartan	Kiltartan	Gort
Newtown	497	Ballymoe	Ballynakill	Glennamaddy
Newtown	391	Moycullen	Moycullen	Galway
Newtown	385	Tiaquin	Abbeyknockmoy	Tuam
Newtown	226	Kiltartan	Kilmacduagh	Gort
Newtown	192	Kiltartan	Kiltartan	Gort
Newtown	88	Killian	Killeroran	Mountbellew
Newtown	70	Longford	Kilmalinoge	Portumna
Newtown (Darcy)	277	Dunmore	Dunmore	Tuam
Newtown (Darcy)	41	Dunmore	Tuam	Tuam
Newtown (Glynn)	102	Kiltartan	Kilmacduagh	Gort
Newtown (Lynott)	181	Dunmore	Dunmore	Tuam
Newtown (Regan)	140	Kiltartan	Kilmacduagh	Gort
**Newtown Bellew**	Town	Tiaquin	Moylough	Mountbellew
**Newtown Butler**	Town	Dunkellin	Oranmore	Galway
Newtown Kilcolgan	132	Dunkellin	Kilcolgan	Gort
Newtown North	134	Leitrim	Ballynakill	Loughrea
Newtown South	70	Leitrim	Ballynakill	Loughrea
Newtownblake	202	Loughrea	Kilthomas	Gort
Newtownbracklagh	139	Leitrim	Duniry	Portumna
Newtowneyre	181	Longford	Kiltormer	Ballinasloe
Newtownkelly	51	Clonmacnowen	Clontuskert	Ballinasloe
Newtownlynch	85	Kiltartan	Kinvarradoorus	Gort
Newvillage	1010	Moycullen	Kilcummin	Oughterard
Newvillage	136	Killian	Killian	Mountbellew
Newvillage	60	Galway	Rahoon	Galway
Nineacres	16	Clare	Annaghdown	Galway
Normangrove	568	Kiltartan	Killinny	Gort
North Island	11	Ballynahinch	Moyrus	Clifden
Northampton	112	Kiltartan	Kinvarradoorus	Gort
Northbrook	415	Kilconnell	Aughrim	Ballinasloe
Nunsacre	5	Longford	Clonfert	Ballinasloe
Nurserypark (or Corrabaun)	48	Tiaquin	Monivea	Tuam
Nut Island	1	Longford	Lickmolassy	Portumna
Nutgrove (or Feebrack)	264	Longford	Tynagh	Portumna
Oakfield (or Gortnandarragh)	259	Moycullen	Killannin	Oughterard
Oakwood North	369	Tiaquin	Abbeyknockmoy	Tuam
Oakwood South	89	Tiaquin	Abbeyknockmoy	Tuam
Oatfield	894	Kilconnell	Aughrim	Ballinasloe
Oddacres	84	Galway	Rahoon	Galway
Oghery	439	Moycullen	Moycullen	Galway
Oghil Beg	437	Longford	Clonfert	Ballinasloe
Oghil More	368	Longford	Clonfert	Ballinasloe
Oghill	1799	Aran	Inishmore	Galway
Oghilly	326	Leitrim	Ballynakill	Portumna
Oghly Island	12	Ballynahinch	Moyrus	Clifden
Oldcastle	103	Dunkellin	Kilconierin	Loughrea
Oldstreet	207	Longford	Kilquain	Portumna
Oltore	192	Clare	Donaghpatrick	Tuam
Omaun Beg	303	Clare	Killererin	Tuam
Omaun More	350	Clare	Killererin	Tuam
Omey Island, Cartoorbeg	73	Ballynahinch	Omey	Clifden
Omey Island, Cloon	94	Ballynahinch	Omey	Clifden
Omey Island, Gooreen	145	Ballynahinch	Omey	Clifden
Omey Island, Gooreenatinny	117	Ballynahinch	Omey	Clifden
Omey Island, Sturrakeen	91	Ballynahinch	Omey	Clifden
Onaght	1767	Aran	Inishmore	Galway
Oorid	1514	Moycullen	Kilcummin	Oughterard
Oran Beg	519	Dunkellin	Oranmore	Galway
Oran More	315	Dunkellin	Oranmore	Galway
Oranhill	346	Dunkellin	Oranmore	Galway
Oranhill	33	Galway	Rahoon	Galway
**Oranmore**	Town	Dunkellin	Oranmore	Galway
Ordnance Ground	6	Moycullen	Kilcummin	Oughterard
Otters Island	1	Longford	Lickmolassy	Portumna
Oughtagh	627	Ballymoe	Ballynakill	Glennamaddy
Oughtagh	77	Ballymoe	Kilbegnet	Roscommon
**Oughterard**	Town	Moycullen	Kilcummin	Oughterard
Oultort	471	Longford	Lickmolassy	Portumna
Owenbristy	69	Dunkellin	Ardrahan	Gort
Owenravaddy (or Riverstick)	71	Kilconnell	Killaan	Loughrea
Ower	1149	Moycullen	Killannin	Oughterard
Ower	668	Clare	Killursa	Tuam
Oxgrove	89	Longford	Killimorbologue	Portumna
Paddock	79	Dunmore	Dunmore	Tuam
Pallas	636	Leitrim	Tynagh	Portumna
Pallas	631	Kilconnell	Fohanagh	Mountbellew
Pallas	197	Longford	Lickmolassy	Portumna
Palmerstown	449	Dunkellin	Athenry	Galway
Park	554	Athenry	Athenry	Loughrea
Park	486	Moycullen	Killannin	Oughterard
Park	456	Moycullen	Moycullen	Galway
Park	207	Clonmacnowen	Killallaghtan	Ballinasloe
Park	167	Ballymoe	Kilbegnet	Glennamaddy
Park	165	Clare	Annaghdown	Galway
Park	40	Dunmore	Kilbennan	Tuam
Park East	357	Ballymoe	Clonbern	Glennamaddy
Park West	177	Ballymoe	Clonbern	Glennamaddy
Parkacurry	323	Tiaquin	Monivea	Tuam
Parkagarraun	68	Leitrim	Ballynakill	Loughrea
Parkaloughan	72	Dunkellin	Kilcolgan	Gort
Parkanallacan	95	Clare	Kilcoona	Tuam
Parkatleva	217	Dunkellin	Kilcolgan	Gort
Parkbaun	351	Ballymoe	Clonbern	Glennamaddy
Parkbaun	121	Dunkellin	Kilcolgan	Gort
Parkbaun	51	Ballymoe	Templetogher	Glennamaddy
Parkeighter	26	Dunkellin	Kilcolgan	Gort
Parkgarve	148	Clare	Kilmoylan	Tuam
Parkgarve	57	Clare	Lackagh	Galway
Parkgarve (or Coarsepark)	118	Clare	Killursa	Tuam
Parklaur	103	Tiaquin	Abbeyknockmoy	Tuam
Parkmore	194	Galway	St. Nicholas	Galway
Parkmore	130	Clare	Tuam	Tuam
Parknahown	90	Leitrim	Tynagh	Portumna
Parkroe	106	Dunkellin	Oranmore	Galway
Parkroe	95	Dunkellin	Killeeneen	Gort
Parkroe	94	Dunkellin	Killora	Loughrea
Parkroe	92	Dunkellin	Killeenavarra	Gort
Parkroe	63	Dunkellin	Killeely	Gort
Parsons Island	3	Kiltartan	Beagh	Gort
Patch	418	Ballymoe	Clonbern	Glennamaddy
Patch	101	Tiaquin	Kilkerrin	Glennamaddy
Patches	153	Ballynahinch	Omey	Clifden
Peak	223	Tiaquin	Monivea	Tuam
Peak	220	Clare	Claregalway	Galway
Peak	133	Clare	Killererin	Tuam
Peakroe	145	Clare	Athenry	Galway
Perssepark	303	Clonmacnowen	Kilcloony	Ballinasloe
Petersburg (or Cappaghnagapple)	655	Ross	Ross	Oughterard
Pollacappul	1077	Ballynahinch	Ballynakill	Clifden
Pollacappul	219	Clare	Killererin	Tuam
Pollacappul	171	Athenry	Athenry	Loughrea
Pollacorragune	1003	Dunmore	Kilbennan	Tuam
Pollacossaun Eighter	50	Clare	Cummer	Tuam
Pollacossaun Oughter	60	Clare	Cummer	Tuam
Pollacrossaun	321	Tiaquin	Moylough	Mountbellew
Pollacullaire	121	Clare	Kilkilvery	Tuam
Pollacurra	67	Loughrea	Ardrahan	Loughrea
Polladooey	156	Tiaquin	Killererin	Tuam
Pollagh	662	Moycullen	Killannin	Oughterard
Pollagh	335	Dunkellin	Killeenavarra	Gort
Pollagh	227	Kiltartan	Beagh	Gort
Pollagh	163	Galway	Rahoon	Galway
Pollagh	133	Athenry	Athenry	Galway
Pollagh	58	Leitrim	Ballynakill	Loughrea
Pollagh	51	Moycullen	Moycullen	Galway
Pollaghrevagh	417	Dunkellin	Claregalway	Galway
Pollagooil	97	Clare	Athenry	Galway
Pollaneyster	298	Ballymoe	Templetogher	Glennamaddy
Pollaphuca	200	Dunmore	Tuam	Tuam
Pollaphuca	66	Dunmore	Dunmore	Tuam
Pollarassa	134	Ballymoe	Templetogher	Glennamaddy
Pollataggle	63	Kiltartan	Ardrahan	Gort
Pollatlugga	188	Clonmacnowen	Killallaghtan	Ballinasloe
Pollaturick	261	Dunmore	Addergoole	Tuam
Pollaturk (or Newgarden)	425	Clare	Belclare	Tuam
Pollavullaun	84	Tiaquin	Monivea	Tuam
Pollawarla	261	Tiaquin	Abbeyknockmoy	Tuam
Pollbaun	132	Clare	Killererin	Tuam
Pollboy	856	Clonmacnowen	Kilcloony	Ballinasloe
Pollboy (or Knockatober)	268	Tiaquin	Monivea	Tuam
Polldarragh	223	Clare	Belclare	Tuam
Polldonoghoe	76	Kiltartan	Ardrahan	Gort
Polldorragha	326	Dunmore	Tuam	Tuam
Polleagh North	112	Ballymoe	Templetogher	Glennamaddy
Polleagh South	134	Ballymoe	Templetogher	Glennamaddy
Polleens	67	Dunmore	Tuam	Tuam
Polleeny	941	Moycullen	Rahoon	Galway
Polleha	341	Moycullen	Moycullen	Galway
Pollfeeneen	38	Longford	Tynagh	Portumna
Pollinashinnagh	116	Dunkellin	Killinan	Loughrea
Pollinaveagh	178	Kiltartan	Kinvarradoorus	Gort
Pollkeen	606	Galway	Oranmore	Galway
Pollleghter	298	Ballymoe	Clonbern	Glennamaddy
Pollnabanny	278	Dunkellin	Killora	Loughrea
Pollnabrone	486	Tiaquin	Killoscobe	Mountbellew
Pollnaclogha	1391	Moycullen	Moycullen	Galway
Pollnagarragh East	175	Dunkellin	Killeely	Gort
Pollnagarragh West	149	Dunkellin	Killeely	Gort
Pollnagroagh	355	Athenry	Athenry	Loughrea
Pollnahallia	733	Clare	Donaghpatrick	Tuam
Pollnahincha	80	Longford	Killimorbologue	Portumna
Pollnamal	487	Clare	Killower	Tuam
Pollnamal	175	Clare	Belclare	Tuam
Pollnamucka (or Charlestown)	88	Killian	Killeroran	Mountbellew
Pollnarooma East	81	Galway	Rahoon	Galway
Pollnarooma West	166	Galway	Rahoon	Galway
Pollremon	345	Ballymoe	Templetogher	Glennamaddy
Pollrevagh	158	Ballynahinch	Ballindoon	Clifden
Pollroebuck	39	Loughrea	Loughrea	Loughrea
Pollshask	121	Ballymoe	Templetogher	Glennamaddy
**Pollsillagh**	Town	Clare	Kilmoylan	Tuam
Pollsillagh	303	Clare	Kilmoylan	Tuam
Polltalloon East	58	Leitrim	Tynagh	Portumna
Polltalloon West	93	Leitrim	Tynagh	Portumna
Pollynoon	114	Ballymoe	Templetogher	Glennamaddy
Poppyhill	381	Longford	Killoran	Ballinasloe
Poppyhill	13	Kilconnell	Killallaghtan	Ballinasloe
Porridgetown East	240	Moycullen	Killannin	Oughterard
Porridgetown West	135	Moycullen	Killannin	Oughterard
Portacarron	233	Moycullen	Kilcummin	Oughterard
Portacarron Beg	48	Moycullen	Kilcummin	Oughterard
Portdarragh	440	Moycullen	Moycullen	Galway
**Portumna**	Town	Longford	Lickmolassy	Portumna
Portumna	783	Longford	Lickmolassy	Portumna
Portumna Demesne	1400	Longford	Lickmolassy	Portumna
Potato Island	1	Moycullen	Kilcummin	Oughterard
Poundcartron	809	Ross	Ross	Oughterard
Pribbaun	211	Moycullen	Killannin	Oughterard
Priests Island	1	Leitrim	Ballynakill	Portumna
Prospect	243	Kiltartan	Beagh	Gort
Prospect	105	Dunmore	Dunmore	Tuam
Prospect	53	Athenry	Athenry	Loughrea
Prospect Demesne	55	Longford	Meelick	Portumna
Prospecthill	282	Dunkellin	Ballynacourty	Galway
Puck Island	6	Moycullen	Killannin	Oughterard
Puckady Island	1	Longford	Lickmolassy	Portumna
Quarryhill	85	Leitrim	Tynagh	Portumna
Quarrymount	149	Dunmore	Dunmore	Tuam
Quarter	136	Dunmore	Dunmore	Tuam
Quaybaun	110	Dunmore	Dunmore	Tuam
Queensacres	26	Longford	Lickmolassy	Portumna
Queensfort	269	Dunmore	Tuam	Tuam
Quinaltagh	721	Dunmore	Addergoole	Tuam
Rabbit Island	18	Moycullen	Kilcummin	Oughterard
Rabbit Island	14	Clare	Annaghdown	Galway
Rabbit Island	3	Leitrim	Ballynakill	Portumna
Rabbit Island	1	Moycullen	Killannin	Oughterard
Rabbitpark	55	Ballymoe	Kilbegnet	Glennamaddy
Racecourse	117	Leitrim	Tynagh	Portumna
Racepark	40	Clare	Kilkilvery	Tuam
Racoona	117	Clare	Annaghdown	Galway
Radullaan	110	Kilconnell	Killaan	Ballinasloe
Rafarn	443	Leitrim	Kilmeen	Loughrea
Rafarn	13	Leitrim	Leitrim	Loughrea
Raford	431	Athenry	Kiltullagh	Loughrea
Rafwee	412	Clare	Killeany	Tuam
Raha	226	Moycullen	Kilcummin	Oughterard
Rahally	191	Kilconnell	Grange	Loughrea
Rahaly	407	Kiltartan	Kilthomas	Gort
Rahaneena	75	Dunkellin	Stradbally	Gort
Rahard	398	Athenry	Athenry	Loughrea
Rahasane	522	Dunkellin	Killeely	Gort
Raheen	542	Longford	Kilquain	Portumna
Raheen	252	Clare	Donaghpatrick	Tuam
Raheen	151	Athenry	Athenry	Loughrea
Raheen	42	Longford	Tynagh	Portumna
Raheen Demesne	313	Kiltartan	Ardrahan	Gort
Raheen Eighter	206	Dunkellin	Kilconickny	Loughrea
Raheen Kilkelly	232	Kiltartan	Ardrahan	Gort
Raheen Oughter	142	Loughrea	Kilconickny	Loughrea
Rahereen	124	Dunkellin	Kilconierin	Loughrea
Rahins	158	Tiaquin	Killoscobe	Mountbellew
Rahogarty North	164	Dunmore	Tuam	Tuam
Rahogarty South	166	Dunmore	Tuam	Tuam
Rahoon	754	Galway	Rahoon	Galway
Rahyconor	136	Longford	Tynagh	Portumna
Rahylin Glebe	28	Galway	St. Nicholas	Galway
Raigh	358	Ross	Ross	Oughterard
Rakerin	338	Kiltartan	Kilbeacanty	Gort
Ralusk	73	Clare	Donaghpatrick	Tuam
Rams Island	7	Ross	Ross	Oughterard
Ranamackan	231	Leitrim	Duniry	Loughrea
Raruddy East	328	Loughrea	Kilconickny	Loughrea
Raruddy West	354	Loughrea	Kilconickny	Loughrea
**Ratesh**	Town	Dunmore	Kilconla	Tuam
Rathanlon	69	Dunkellin	Ardrahan	Gort
Rathbaun	394	Dunkellin	Ardrahan	Gort
Rathbaun	267	Tiaquin	Killosolan	Mountbellew
Rathcosgry	369	Dunkellin	Ardrahan	Loughrea
Rathfee	449	Clare	Lackagh	Galway
Rathglass	502	Kilconnell	Killaan	Loughrea
Rathgorgin	604	Athenry	Kilconierin	Loughrea
Rathmore	231	Clare	Cummer	Tuam
Rathmore Demesne	302	Longford	Killimorbologue	Portumna
Rathmoreahanduff	88	Longford	Killimorbologue	Portumna
Rathmorrissy	617	Athenry	Athenry	Loughrea
Rathmoyle	67	Dunkellin	Killeely	Gort
Rathwilladoon	368	Kiltartan	Beagh	Gort
Rayhill	144	Kilconnell	Killallaghtan	Ballinasloe
Reaghan	493	Leitrim	Tynagh	Portumna
Reask	626	Longford	Clonfert	Ballinasloe
Reask	117	Leitrim	Tynagh	Portumna
Reaskgarriff	45	Dunkellin	Ardrahan	Gort
Reaskmore	306	Longford	Meelick	Portumna
Reaskmore	85	Dunkellin	Killora	Loughrea
Reaskrevagh	45	Dunkellin	Kilchreest	Loughrea
Red Island	16	Ross	Ross	Oughterard
Red Island	3	Ballynahinch	Moyrus	Clifden
Red Island	1	Ballynahinch	Moyrus	Clifden
Redpark	142	Leitrim	Tynagh	Portumna
Reynabrone	406	Leitrim	Ballynakill	Loughrea
Reynclamper	397	Leitrim	Ballynakill	Portumna
Reyrawer	579	Kiltartan	Kilthomas	Gort
Richmond	422	Tiaquin	Kilkerrin	Glennamaddy
Ricks Island	1	Kiltartan	Beagh	Gort
Rindifin	236	Kiltartan	Beagh	Gort
Ringeelaun	211	Dunkellin	Drumacoo	Gort
Rinkippeen	181	Dunmore	Tuam	Tuam
Rinmore	465	Galway	St. Nicholas	Galway
Rinn	433	Dunkellin	Killeely	Gort
Rinn	347	Dunkellin	Oranmore	Galway
Rinnaharney	160	Clare	Annaghdown	Galway
Rinnaknock	82	Clare	Killursa	Tuam
Rinneen	250	Moycullen	Moycullen	Galway
Rinneen	192	Kiltartan	Kiltartan	Gort
Rinneen	140	Kiltartan	Kinvarradoorus	Gort
Rinnerroon	72	Moycullen	Kilcummin	Oughterard
Rinrush	134	Kiltartan	Kiltartan	Gort
Rinskea	133	Leitrim	Clonrush	Scarriff
**Rinville**	Town	Dunkellin	Oranmore	Galway
Rinville East	248	Dunkellin	Oranmore	Galway
Rinville West	820	Dunkellin	Oranmore	Galway
Riversdale	116	Killian	Killeroran	Mountbellew
Riverstick (or Owenavaddy)	71	Kilconnell	Killaan	Loughrea
Rock Island	34	Aran	Inishmore	Galway
Rockfield	253	Dunkellin	Killeeneen	Loughrea
Rockfield East	319	Tiaquin	Kilkerrin	Glennamaddy
Rockfield West	161	Tiaquin	Kilkerrin	Glennamaddy
Rockhill	50	Dunkellin	Oranmore	Galway
Rocklands	75	Dunkellin	Oranmore	Galway
Rockpark	85	Kiltartan	Kilmacduagh	Gort
Rockwood	41	Dunkellin	Claregalway	Galway
Roeillaun	36	Ballynahinch	Ballynakill	Clifden
Roeillaun	18	Moycullen	Kilcummin	Oughterard
Roeillaun	3	Moycullen	Kilcummin	Oughterard
Roeillaun	3	Ballynahinch	Ballynakill	Clifden
Roeillaun	3	Ballynahinch	Omey	Clifden
Roeillaun East	2	Ross	Cong	Oughterard
Roeillaunbaun	1	Ross	Cong	Oughterard
Roeillaundoo	5	Ross	Cong	Oughterard
Roevehagh	679	Dunkellin	Killeely	Gort
Rogersfield (or Gortrory)	52	Clare	Killeany	Tuam
Roo	847	Kiltartan	Kilmacduagh	Gort
Roo	742	Dunkellin	Killora	Loughrea
Roo Demesne	309	Kiltartan	Kinvarradoorus	Gort
Rooaun	636	Longford	Clonfert	Ballinasloe
Rooaun	175	Kilconnell	Killallaghtan	Ballinasloe
Rooaunmore	251	Dunkellin	Ardrahan	Gort
Rooaunmore	250	Clare	Claregalway	Galway
Rooghan	170	Longford	Clonfert	Ballinasloe
Rooghaun	215	Dunkellin	Ardrahan	Gort
Rookwood (or Ballagad)	316	Killian	Athleague	Mountbellew
Roscam	408	Galway	Oranmore	Galway
Roscrea	122	Ballynahinch	Ballynakill	Clifden
Rosdaul	125	Ballymoe	Ballynakill	Glennamaddy
Roskeeda	199	Moycullen	Kilcummin	Oughterard
Rosleague	218	Ballynahinch	Ballynakill	Clifden
Rosmearan	169	Dunmore	Addergoole	Tuam
Rosmore	1011	Leitrim	Ballynakill	Portumna
Rosmoylan	464	Ballymoe	Kilbegnet	Roscommon
Rosmoylan	54	Ballymoe	Dunamon	Roscommon
Rosmuck	523	Moycullen	Kilcummin	Oughterard
Rosroe	1049	Ballynahinch	Moyrus	Clifden
Rosroe	296	Ballynahinch	Ballynakill	Clifden
Ross	138	Ballynahinch	Ballynakill	Clifden
Ross	83	Leitrim	Ballynakill	Loughrea
Ross	29	Clare	Killursa	Tuam
Ross Demesne	477	Moycullen	Killannin	Oughterard
Rossadillisk	185	Ballynahinch	Omey	Clifden
Rossaveel	809	Moycullen	Kilcummin	Galway
Rosscahill East	330	Moycullen	Killannin	Oughterard
Rosscahill West	324	Moycullen	Killannin	Oughterard
Rosseeshal	49	Leitrim	Ballynakill	Loughrea
Rosshill	139	Ross	Ross	Oughterard
Rossroe Island	57	Moycullen	Kilcummin	Oughterard
Rostollus	194	Leitrim	Ballynakill	Portumna
Rosturra	511	Leitrim	Ballynakill	Loughrea
Roundfield	210	Tiaquin	Monivea	Tuam
**Roundstone**	Town	Ballynahinch	Moyrus	Clifden
Roundstone	210	Ballynahinch	Moyrus	Clifden
Roxborough	392	Loughrea	Killinan	Loughrea
Roy	242	Dunmore	Dunmore	Tuam
Roymore	25	Dunkellin	Kilcolgan	Gort
Rusheen	61	Ballynahinch	Omey	Clifden
Rusheen	27	Galway	Rahoon	Galway
Rusheen East	202	Ross	Ross	Oughterard
Rusheen West	123	Ross	Ross	Oughterard
Rusheenduff	287	Ballynahinch	Ballynakill	Clifden
Rusheennacholla	78	Ballynahinch	Moyrus	Clifden
Rusheennamanagh	926	Ballynahinch	Moyrus	Clifden
Rusheens North	315	Clare	Tuam	Tuam
Rusheens South	195	Clare	Tuam	Tuam
Rusheeny	1673	Moycullen	Kilcummin	Oughterard
Rusheeny	121	Longford	Killimorbologue	Portumna
Rusheenyvulligan	103	Ballynahinch	Moyrus	Clifden
Rushestown	882	Killian	Killian	Mountbellew
Rushveala	151	Moycullen	Kilcummin	Oughterard
Russaun	236	Kiltartan	Kilbeacanty	Gort
Russelstown	652	Dunmore	Addergoole	Tuam
Ryehill	302	Dunmore	Tuam	Tuam
Ryehill Demesne	172	Tiaquin	Monivea	Tuam
Saintclerans	626	Dunkellin	Lickerrig	Loughrea
Saintellen	90	Athenry	Athenry	Galway
Sally Island	1	Kiltartan	Beagh	Gort
Salrock	288	Ballynahinch	Ballynakill	Clifden
Sawnagh	367	Longford	Lickmolassy	Portumna
Scalp	211	Loughrea	Ardrahan	Gort
Scalp	153	Dunkellin	Killeeneen	Gort
Scarreth	105	Kilconnell	Ballymacward	Mountbellew
Scarriff	158	Kiltartan	Beagh	Gort
Scotland	193	Ballymoe	Boyounagh	Glennamaddy
Scrahallia	191	Ballynahinch	Moyrus	Clifden
Scregg East	327	Tiaquin	Kilkerrin	Glennamaddy
Scregg West	308	Tiaquin	Kilkerrin	Glennamaddy
Seafield	85	Dunkellin	Ballynacourty	Galway
Seal Island	3	Kiltartan	Kinvarradoorus	Gort
Seapoint	17	Galway	Rahoon	Galway
Seecon	1828	Moycullen	Killannin	Oughterard
Seefin	309	Dunkellin	Killogilleen	Loughrea
Seershin	286	Moycullen	Rahoon	Galway
Sellernaun East	372	Leitrim	Inishcaltra	Scarriff
Sellernaun West	370	Leitrim	Inishcaltra	Scarriff
Shanadullaun	372	Ross	Ross	Oughterard
Shanafaraghaun	1641	Ross	Ross	Oughterard
Shanakeever	259	Ballynahinch	Omey	Clifden
Shanaveag	287	Ballynahinch	Ballynakill	Clifden
Shanballard	254	Tiaquin	Clonkeen	Loughrea
Shanbally	213	Dunkellin	Killeeneen	Gort
Shanbally	213	Leitrim	Duniry	Portumna
Shanbally	165	Clare	Annaghdown	Galway
Shanbally	122	Longford	Kilquain	Portumna
Shanbally	71	Dunkellin	Killora	Loughrea
Shanbally (or Greenfield)	199	Clare	Killursa	Tuam
Shanballybeg	35	Killian	Killian	Mountbellew
Shanballycolman	45	Kilconnell	Killallaghtan	Ballinasloe
Shanballyduff	46	Galway	Rahoon	Galway
Shanballyeden	39	Ballymoe	Dunamon	Roscommon
Shanballyeeshal	261	Tiaquin	Clonkeen	Loughrea
Shanballymore	727	Dunmore	Addergoole	Tuam
Shanballymore	263	Tiaquin	Clonkeen	Loughrea
Shanballymore	218	Killian	Killeroran	Mountbellew
Shanballymore	24	Moycullen	Kilcummin	Oughterard
Shanboley	351	Clonmacnowen	Ahascragh	Ballinasloe
Shanboolard	283	Ballynahinch	Ballynakill	Clifden
Shanclogh	250	Kiltartan	Kinvarradoorus	Gort
Shancloon	464	Clare	Donaghpatrick	Tuam
Shangarry	409	Leitrim	Abbeygormacan	Loughrea
Shangarry	183	Leitrim	Tynagh	Loughrea
Shangort	48	Galway	Rahoon	Galway
Shankill	535	Killian	Moylough	Mountbellew
Shankill	198	Clare	Annaghdown	Galway
Shankill East	308	Tiaquin	Kilkerrin	Glennamaddy
Shankill West	391	Tiaquin	Kilkerrin	Glennamaddy
Shannadonnell	530	Ballynahinch	Moyrus	Clifden
Shannadullaghaun	555	Moycullen	Kilcummin	Oughterard
Shannafreaghoge	185	Moycullen	Rahoon	Galway
Shannagh Beg	298	Tiaquin	Kilkerrin	Glennamaddy
Shannagh More	500	Tiaquin	Kilkerrin	Glennamaddy
Shannagurraun	1225	Moycullen	Moycullen	Galway
Shannakeela	1907	Ballynahinch	Moyrus	Clifden
Shannanagower	139	Ballynahinch	Ballindoon	Clifden
Shannapheasteen	3104	Moycullen	Kilcummin	Galway
Shannaunnafeola	2888	Moycullen	Kilcummin	Oughterard
Shannavarra	929	Moycullen	Kilcummin	Oughterard
Shannawagh	100	Moycullen	Kilcummin	Oughterard
Shannawira	796	Ballynahinch	Moyrus	Clifden
Shannawona	1121	Moycullen	Kilcummin	Oughterard
Shannawoneen	1030	Moycullen	Killannin	Galway
Shantallow	287	Clare	Killererin	Tuam
Shantallow	198	Dunkellin	Athenry	Galway
Shantallow	154	Ballymoe	Clonbern	Glennamaddy
Shantallow	123	Galway	Rahoon	Galway
Shantallow	117	Tiaquin	Abbeyknockmoy	Tuam
Shantallow	114	Dunkellin	Ardrahan	Gort
Shanvally	1006	Moycullen	Kilcummin	Oughterard
Shanvally	211	Longford	Lickmolassy	Portumna
Shanvally	85	Dunmore	Tuam	Tuam
Shanvally	59	Kiltartan	Kilthomas	Gort
Shanvallybeg	10	Ballynahinch	Ballynakill	Clifden
Shanvallycahill	497	Ross	Ballinchalla	Ballinrobe
Shanvoher	35	Leitrim	Duniry	Loughrea
Shanvoley	42	Clonmacnowen	Clontuskert	Ballinasloe
Sheeaun	356	Kiltartan	Kilmacduagh	Gort
Sheeaun	178	Tiaquin	Clonkeen	Loughrea
Sheeaun	51	Longford	Kilmalinoge	Portumna
Sheeaunpark	118	Clare	Lackagh	Galway
Sheeaunroe	192	Moycullen	Moycullen	Galway
Sheeaunrush	54	Longford	Lickmolassy	Portumna
Sheeauns	666	Ballynahinch	Ballynakill	Clifden
Sheepwalk	145	Clonmacnowen	Clontuskert	Ballinasloe
Shessanagirba	148	Kiltartan	Kinvarradoorus	Gort
Shessareagh	93	Dunkellin	Killeenavarra	Gort
Shessy North	145	Kiltartan	Ardrahan	Gort
Shessy South	108	Kiltartan	Ardrahan	Gort
Shigaunagh	588	Kiltartan	Killinny	Gort
Shindilla (or Lurgan)	1121	Moycullen	Kilcummin	Oughterard
Shinnanagh	639	Ballynahinch	Omey	Clifden
Shoodaun	542	Tiaquin	Monivea	Loughrea
Shore Island	1	Loughrea	Killeenadeema	Loughrea
Shrub Island	1	Clare	Killursa	Tuam
Shrule	91	Dunmore	Dunmore	Tuam
Shrulegrove	214	Clare	Donaghpatrick	Tuam
Silver Island	1	Longford	Lickmolassy	Portumna
Silverhill	159	Ballynahinch	Ballindoon	Clifden
Silverstream	33	Leitrim	Ballynakill	Loughrea
Skeaghaderreen	169	Athenry	Athenry	Galway
Skeagharegan	112	Dunkellin	Kilconierin	Loughrea
Skeaghbeg	117	Clare	Kilkilvery	Tuam
Skecoor	432	Longford	Kiltormer	Ballinasloe
Skehaghard	278	Ballymoe	Kilbegnet	Glennamaddy
**Skehanagh**	Town	Kiltartan	Kilthomas	Gort
Skehanagh	550	Tiaquin	Moylough	Mountbellew
Skehanagh	324	Kiltartan	Kilthomas	Gort
Skehanagh	115	Longford	Tynagh	Portumna
Skehanagh	100	Longford	Kilquain	Portumna
Skehanagh	60	Kiltartan	Kiltartan	Gort
Skehanagh	41	Longford	Fahy	Portumna
Skehanagh North	209	Kilconnell	Killaan	Loughrea
Skehanagh South	104	Kilconnell	Killaan	Loughrea
Skenageehy	123	Longford	Kiltormer	Ballinasloe
Slaghta	135	Longford	Fahy	Portumna
Slatefield	185	Leitrim	Ballynakill	Loughrea
Slieve	573	Ballymoe	Dunmore	Glennamaddy
Slieveaneena	2993	Moycullen	Moycullen	Galway
Slieveaun	185	Dunkellin	Stradbally	Galway
Slieveburke	1460	Ballynahinch	Ballindoon	Clifden
Slievedarragh	116	Dunmore	Dunmore	Tuam
Slievedotia	72	Kilconnell	Grange	Loughrea
Slievefin	503	Clare	Annaghdown	Galway
Slievegorm	125	Tiaquin	Killererin	Tuam
Slievemurry	1162	Killian	Killeroran	Mountbellew
Slieveroe	461	Clare	Killursa	Tuam
Slieveroe	275	Dunkellin	Killora	Loughrea
Slieveroe	191	Tiaquin	Kilkerrin	Glennamaddy
Slihaun Beg	74	Kilconnell	Killallaghtan	Ballinasloe
Slihaun More	207	Kilconnell	Killallaghtan	Ballinasloe
Sloe Island	1	Leitrim	Ballynakill	Portumna
Smith's Island	2	Ross	Cong	Oughterard
Snahadaun (or Needle Island)	1	Moycullen	Kilcummin	Oughterard
Snauvbo	444	Moycullen	Kilcummin	Oughterard
Somerset	543	Longford	Clontuskert	Ballinasloe
Sonnagh	308	Clonmacnowen	Fohanagh	Ballinasloe
Sonnagh	282	Ballymoe	Kilbegnet	Glennamaddy
Sonnagh	139	Ballymoe	Ballynakill	Glennamaddy
Sonnagh East	231	Ballymoe	Boyounagh	Glennamaddy
Sonnagh New	503	Loughrea	Killeenadeema	Loughrea
Sonnagh Old	1640	Loughrea	Killeenadeema	Loughrea
Sonnagh West	139	Ballymoe	Boyounagh	Glennamaddy
**Spiddle**	Town	Moycullen	Moycullen	Galway
Spiddle East	377	Moycullen	Moycullen	Galway
Spiddle Middle	338	Moycullen	Moycullen	Galway
Spiddle West	727	Moycullen	Moycullen	Galway
Spindillaun	1	Longford	Lickmolassy	Portumna
Spring Garden	275	Leitrim	Tynagh	Portumna
Spring Grove (or Timsallagh)	740	Longford	Kilquain	Portumna
Springfield	463	Longford	Killoran	Ballinasloe
Springfield	166	Ballymoe	Templetogher	Glennamaddy
Springlawn	1124	Killian	Ballynakill	Mountbellew
Srah	444	Leitrim	Ballynakill	Portumna
Srah	196	Kiltartan	Kiltartan	Gort
Srah	188	Dunkellin	Kilconickny	Loughrea
Srah	31	Clonmacnowen	Kilgerrill	Ballinasloe
Srahaun	175	Longford	Clonfert	Ballinasloe
Srahaunananta	203	Leitrim	Kilteskill	Loughrea
Srahaunnagort (or Thornfield)	121	Killian	Athleague	Mountbellew
Srahdoo	67	Leitrim	Kilmeen	Loughrea
Sraheendoo	69	Athenry	Kiltullagh	Loughrea
Srahgarve	158	Killian	Taghboy	Mountbellew
Srahloughra	367	Killian	Ahascragh	Ballinasloe
Sranahaw	822	Ross	Ross	Oughterard
Sroove	76	Dunkellin	Kilcolgan	Gort
Srue	339	Moycullen	Kilcummin	Oughterard
Sruhaunfusta	127	Kilconnell	Killosolan	Mountbellew
St Brendans (or Cregganangrogy)	530	Killian	Killian	Mountbellew
St Laurencesfields	54	Loughrea	Loughrea	Loughrea
St Maedaras Island	60	Ballynahinch	Moyrus	Clifden
Stauntan's Island (or Clydagh)	2	Clare	Cargin	Tuam
Stonepark	117	Ballymoe	Boyounagh	Glennamaddy
Stonepark	81	Tiaquin	Monivea	Tuam
Stonepark (or Bawnmore)	101	Clare	Donaghpatrick	Tuam
Stonetown	274	Ballymoe	Boyounagh	Glennamaddy
Stonyisland	557	Longford	Lickmolassy	Portumna
Stowelodge	261	Clare	Killererin	Tuam
Stowlin	539	Longford	Kilquain	Portumna
**Stradbally**	Town	Dunkellin	Oranmore	Galway
Stradbally East	164	Dunkellin	Stradbally	Galway
Stradbally North	395	Dunkellin	Stradbally	Galway
Stradbally South	284	Dunkellin	Stradbally	Galway
Stradbally West	144	Dunkellin	Stradbally	Gort
Straid	148	Ballymoe	Templetogher	Glennamaddy
Straw Island	2	Clonmacnowen	Clontuskert	Ballinasloe
Stream	47	Moycullen	Killannin	Oughterard
Streamsford	278	Kilconnell	Killimordaly	Loughrea
Streamsford	237	Kilconnell	Grange	Loughrea
Streamstown	396	Leitrim	Duniry	Loughrea
Streamstown	132	Kiltartan	Kilbeacanty	Gort
Streamstown (or Barratrough)	1000	Ballynahinch	Omey	Clifden
Stripe	156	Clare	Cummer	Tuam
Stripe	77	Dunmore	Tuam	Tuam
Stripe	71	Moycullen	Rahoon	Galway
Stripe North	339	Dunmore	Dunmore	Tuam
Stripe South	38	Dunmore	Dunmore	Tuam
Sturrakeen	91	Ballynahinch	Omey	Clifden
Summerfield (or Cahergowan)	841	Dunkellin	Claregalway	Galway
Summerhill	225	Killian	Killian	Mountbellew
Summerville	342	Tiaquin	Moylough	Mountbellew
Sunhill	162	Tiaquin	Abbeyknockmoy	Tuam
Swan Island	1	Kiltartan	Beagh	Gort
Swiftsacre	14	Ballymoe	Boyounagh	Glennamaddy
Sycamorehill	520	Longford	Clonfert	Ballinasloe
Sylaun	479	Galway	Oranmore	Galway
Sylaun	273	Clare	Belclare	Tuam
Sylaun	68	Dunmore	Kilbennan	Tuam
Sylaun	36	Clare	Killower	Tuam
Sylaun East	230	Dunmore	Dunmore	Tuam
Sylaun West	90	Dunmore	Dunmore	Tuam
Sylaunnagran	186	Dunmore	Dunmore	Tuam
Tallavnamraher	231	Ballymoe	Kilbegnet	Glennamaddy
Tallowroe	368	Dunkellin	Killeeneen	Gort
Tarramud	451	Dunkellin	Stradbally	Galway
Tarrea	312	Dunkellin	Killeenavarra	Gort
Tawin East	179	Dunkellin	Ballynacourty	Galway
Tawin West	217	Dunkellin	Ballynacourty	Galway
Tawnagh East	158	Kiltartan	Kilmacduagh	Gort
Tawnagh East	111	Kiltartan	Kinvarradoorus	Gort
Tawnagh West	242	Kiltartan	Kinvarradoorus	Gort
Tawnagh West	66	Kiltartan	Kilmacduagh	Gort
Tawnaghbaun	259	Ballynahinch	Moyrus	Clifden
Tawnaghbaun	160	Tiaquin	Abbeyknockmoy	Tuam
Tawnaghbeg	194	Moycullen	Kilcummin	Oughterard
Tawnaghbeg	43	Clare	Cummer	Tuam
Tawnaghmore	600	Ballynahinch	Moyrus	Clifden
Tawnaghmore	410	Clare	Kilmoylan	Tuam
Tawnaleen	1399	Ross	Ross	Oughterard
Taylorstown	101	Clonmacnowen	Clontuskert	Ballinasloe
Teeranea	1613	Moycullen	Killannin	Oughterard
Teeranea	540	Ross	Ross	Oughterard
Teernakill North	1125	Ross	Ross	Oughterard
Teernakill South	4766	Ross	Ross	Oughterard
Temple	203	Tiaquin	Clonkeen	Loughrea
Templemartin	413	Dunkellin	Killora	Loughrea
Templemoyle	151	Tiaquin	Monivea	Loughrea
Templemoyle	82	Tiaquin	Moylough	Mountbellew
Templepark	118	Clonmacnowen	Clontuskert	Ballinasloe
Termon	645	Kiltartan	Kilmacduagh	Gort
Terryland	218	Galway	St. Nicholas	Galway
Thomastown	114	Clare	Belclare	Tuam
Thornfield	198	Longford	Lickmolassy	Portumna
Thornfield (or Srahaunnagort)	121	Killian	Athleague	Mountbellew
Tiaquin Demesne	427	Tiaquin	Monivea	Loughrea
Ticooly (Carr)	221	Kilconnell	Killosolan	Mountbellew
Ticooly (O'Kelly)	710	Tiaquin	Killosolan	Mountbellew
Tievebaun	1136	Ballynahinch	Omey	Clifden
Tievebreen	1561	Ballynahinch	Moyrus	Clifden
Tievegarriff	118	Ballynahinch	Ballynakill	Clifden
Tievegarriff	46	Galway	Rahoon	Galway
Tievemore	48	Ballynahinch	Ballynakill	Clifden
Tigreenaun	391	Clare	Killererin	Tuam
Timacat	486	Tiaquin	Kilkerrin	Glennamaddy
Timadooaun	594	Ballymoe	Dunmore	Glennamaddy
Timard	295	Ballymoe	Clonbern	Glennamaddy
Timsallagh (or Spring Grove)	740	Longford	Kilquain	Portumna
Tinageeragh	201	Loughrea	Killeenadeema	Loughrea
Tinkershill	195	Dunmore	Tuam	Tuam
Tintrim	206	Leitrim	Clonrush	Scarriff
Tiraloughan	97	Kiltartan	Beagh	Gort
Tiranascragh	1006	Longford	Tiranascragh	Portumna
Tirboy	154	Clare	Tuam	Tuam
Tirneevin	118	Kiltartan	Kilmacduagh	Gort
Tirrooaun	311	Longford	Clontuskert	Ballinasloe
Tirur	333	Killian	Killian	Mountbellew
Tisaxon	470	Tiaquin	Monivea	Loughrea
**Tober**	Town	Ballymoe	Kilcroan	Glennamaddy
Toberacreggaun	78	Dunkellin	Ardrahan	Gort
Toberbiroge	178	Ross	Cong	Oughterard
Toberbrackan	181	Dunkellin	Killeely	Gort
Toberconnelly	21	Athenry	Athenry	Loughrea
Tobercrossaun	119	Clare	Killursa	Tuam
Tobergrellan	83	Clonmacnowen	Kilcloony	Ballinasloe
Toberjarlath	114	Clare	Tuam	Tuam
Tobermina	190	Clare	Belclare	Tuam
Tobernaclug	392	Ballymoe	Dunmore	Glennamaddy
Tobernavean	363	Clare	Athenry	Galway
**Toberreendoney**	Town	Kiltartan	Beagh	Gort
Toberroe	482	Athenry	Athenry	Loughrea
Toberroe	390	Dunmore	Kilconla	Tuam
Toberroe East	114	Ballymoe	Ballynakill	Glennamaddy
Toberroe West	167	Ballymoe	Ballynakill	Glennamaddy
Tobinstown	89	Ballymoe	Kilcroan	Glennamaddy
Togher Beg	191	Clare	Killererin	Tuam
Togher More	360	Clare	Killererin	Tuam
Toghergar	42	Killian	Killian	Mountbellew
Tomany Beg	200	Leitrim	Ballynakill	Loughrea
Tomany More	347	Leitrim	Ballynakill	Loughrea
Tomanynambraher	101	Leitrim	Ballynakill	Loughrea
Tomnahulla	617	Clare	Annaghdown	Tuam
Tomree	595	Tiaquin	Moylough	Mountbellew
Tonabrocky	435	Galway	Rahoon	Galway
Tonacooleen	378	Clare	Donaghpatrick	Tuam
Tonacrick	101	Moycullen	Kilcummin	Galway
Tonacurra	305	Killian	Killian	Mountbellew
Tonacurragh	316	Galway	Oranmore	Galway
Tonadooravaun	259	Ballynahinch	Ballynakill	Clifden
Tonagarraun	546	Clare	Annaghdown	Galway
Tonaglanna	480	Ross	Ballinrobe	Ballinrobe
Tonamace	241	Clare	Annaghdown	Galway
Tonamace	108	Clare	Kilmoylan	Tuam
Tonamaddy	78	Ballymoe	Kilbegnet	Roscommon
Tonaroasty	58	Loughrea	Loughrea	Loughrea
Tonbaun	108	Dunkellin	Kilconickny	Loughrea
Tonlegee	343	Ross	Ross	Oughterard
Tonlegee	117	Dunmore	Kilbennan	Tuam
Tonmoyle	445	Dunmore	Tuam	Tuam
Tonranny	102	Kiltartan	Beagh	Gort
Tonranny Mountain	58	Kiltartan	Beagh	Gort
Tonrevagh	291	Dunmore	Tuam	Tuam
Tonroe	682	Dunkellin	Ballynacourty	Galway
Tonroe	291	Leitrim	Ballynakill	Loughrea
Tonroe	209	Dunkellin	Ardrahan	Gort
Tonroe	196	Clare	Kilkilvery	Tuam
Tonwee	66	Moycullen	Kilcummin	Oughterard
Tonweeroe	49	Moycullen	Kilcummin	Oughterard
Tooloobaunbeg	454	Loughrea	Lickerrig	Loughrea
Tooloobauntemple	244	Athenry	Kilconickny	Loughrea
Toomard	253	Killian	Killian	Mountbellew
Toombeola	461	Ballynahinch	Moyrus	Clifden
Toomore	135	Kilconnell	Killallaghtan	Ballinasloe
Tooraskeheen	715	Ballynahinch	Omey	Clifden
Toorclogher	59	Dunkellin	Killogilleen	Loughrea
Tooree	163	Kilconnell	Killallaghtan	Ballinasloe
Tooreen	757	Ballynahinch	Ballynakill	Clifden
Tooreen	236	Kilconnell	Killaan	Ballinasloe
Tooreen	163	Kiltartan	Beagh	Gort
Tooreen	148	Ballynahinch	Omey	Clifden
Tooreen	43	Dunmore	Dunmore	Tuam
Tooreen	33	Leitrim	Tynagh	Portumna
Tooreen East	288	Dunkellin	Killeenavarra	Gort
Tooreen North	103	Leitrim	Ballynakill	Loughrea
Tooreen South	192	Leitrim	Ballynakill	Loughrea
Tooreen West	214	Dunkellin	Killeenavarra	Gort
Tooreena	885	Ballynahinch	Ballynakill	Clifden
Tooreenacoona	539	Ballynahinch	Ballynakill	Clifden
Tooreenard	116	Clonmacnowen	Killallaghtan	Ballinasloe
Tooreeny	422	Moycullen	Moycullen	Galway
Tooremacnevin	1175	Loughrea	Killeenadeema	Loughrea
Toorkeel	111	Tiaquin	Monivea	Loughrea
Toorleitra	3358	Leitrim	Ballynakill	Loughrea
Toorloggagh	735	Ross	Ross	Oughterard
Toormacleane	103	Kilconnell	Grange	Loughrea
Toormore	65	Longford	Kilmalinoge	Portumna
Toorsmuttaun	95	Leitrim	Ballynakill	Loughrea
Tormaun	78	Kilconnell	Killimordaly	Loughrea
Townaloughra	261	Ballynahinch	Omey	Clifden
Townparks	501	Galway	St. Nicholas	Galway
Townparks	379	Galway	Rahoon	Galway
Townparks	119	Clonmacnowen	Kilcloony	Ballinasloe
Townparks	117	Longford	Donanaghta	Portumna
Townparks (1st Division)	148	Dunmore	Tuam	Tuam
Townparks (2nd Division)	102	Clare	Tuam	Tuam
Townparks (3rd Division)	34	Clare	Tuam	Tuam
Townparks (4th Division)	14	Clare	Tuam	Tuam
Townparks (5th Division)	191	Dunmore	Tuam	Tuam
Traskernagh	241	Leitrim	Kilmeen	Loughrea
Trasternagh North	153	Tiaquin	Moylough	Mountbellew
Trasternagh South	330	Tiaquin	Moylough	Glennamaddy
Trean	256	Ross	Ballinrobe	Ballinrobe
Trean	105	Ballynahinch	Omey	Clifden
Treananearla	391	Longford	Killimorbologue	Portumna
Treanbaun	285	Clare	Killower	Tuam
Treanbaun	172	Kilconnell	Killaan	Loughrea
Treanbaun	140	Clare	Belclare	Tuam
Treanboy	397	Ballymoe	Kilcroan	Glennamaddy
Treankyle	31	Dunkellin	Kilconierin	Loughrea
Treanlaur	179	Dunkellin	Ballynacourty	Galway
Treanpark	105	Ballymoe	Ballynakill	Glennamaddy
Treanrevagh	82	Killian	Moylough	Mountbellew
Trellick	227	Kiltartan	Kinvarradoorus	Gort
Treveg Island	1	Longford	Meelick	Portumna
Trihill East	273	Killian	Killeroran	Mountbellew
Trihill West	506	Killian	Killeroran	Mountbellew
Tristaun	751	Clonmacnowen	Clontuskert	Ballinasloe
Truska	415	Ballynahinch	Ballindoon	Clifden
Truskaunnagappul	189	Moycullen	Moycullen	Galway
Trusky East	305	Galway	Rahoon	Galway
Trusky West	294	Galway	Rahoon	Galway
Trust	238	Kilconnell	Kilconnell	Ballinasloe
**Tuam**	Town	Dunmore	Tuam	Tuam
**Tuam**	Town	Clare	Tuam	Tuam
Tulla	160	Leitrim	Ballynakill	Loughrea
Tullagh Lower	67	Loughrea	Loughrea	Loughrea
Tullagh Upper	86	Loughrea	Loughrea	Loughrea
Tullaghaboy	254	Moycullen	Kilcummin	Oughterard
Tullaghann	124	Tiaquin	Kilkerrin	Glennamaddy
Tullaghlumman Beg	394	Ballynahinch	Moyrus	Clifden
Tullaghlumman More	787	Ballynahinch	Moyrus	Clifden
Tullaghmore	441	Moycullen	Kilcummin	Oughterard
Tullawicky	182	Kilconnell	Ballymacward	Ballinasloe
Tullinlicky	363	Longford	Fahy	Portumna
Tullira	541	Dunkellin	Ardrahan	Gort
Tullokyne	174	Moycullen	Moycullen	Galway
Tully	518	Moycullen	Killannin	Galway
Tully	358	Killian	Killeroran	Mountbellew
Tully	122	Longford	Meelick	Portumna
Tully	106	Killian	Killian	Mountbellew
Tully Beg	187	Ballynahinch	Ballynakill	Clifden
Tully More	345	Ballynahinch	Ballynakill	Clifden
Tullybeg North	63	Dunmore	Tuam	Tuam
Tullybeg South	151	Dunmore	Tuam	Tuam
Tullybrattan	79	Kiltartan	Beagh	Gort
Tullyconor	424	Ballynahinch	Ballynakill	Clifden
Tullyroe	292	Killian	Killeroran	Mountbellew
Tullyvealnaslee	58	Moycullen	Kilcummin	Oughterard
Tullyvoheen	364	Ballynahinch	Omey	Clifden
Tullyvrick	60	Moycullen	Kilcummin	Oughterard
Tulrush	240	Clare	Killower	Tuam
Tummerillaun	148	Killian	Ahascragh	Ballinasloe
Tumnasrah	165	Moycullen	Moycullen	Galway
Tumneenaun	300	Ross	Cong	Oughterard
Turavaghla	74	Kiltartan	Kilmacduagh	Gort
Turbot Island	147	Ballynahinch	Omey	Clifden
Turkisland	136	Kilconnell	Killaan	Ballinasloe
Turlough	3078	Moycullen	Kilcummin	Oughterard
Turlough	614	Ballymoe	Kilcroan	Glennamaddy
Turloughalanger	104	Athenry	Athenry	Loughrea
Turloughbeg	269	Moycullen	Kilcummin	Oughterard
Turloughcartron	33	Clare	Cummer	Tuam
Turloughcor	272	Clare	Killeany	Tuam
Turloughgarve	339	Clare	Annaghdown	Tuam
Turloughkeeloge	128	Kiltartan	Kinvarradoorus	Gort
Turloughmartin	129	Clare	Cummer	Tuam
Turloughmore Common	105	Clare	Lackagh	Galway
Turloughnacloghdoo Comm	48	Loughrea	Kilthomas	Loughrea
Turloughnaroyey (or Common)	93	Clare	Belclare	Tuam
Turloughour	111	Clare	Cummer	Tuam
Turloughrevagh	145	Clare	Kilmoylan	Tuam
Turoe	392	Athenry	Kiltullagh	Loughrea
Turra Beg	52	Kiltartan	Kilbeacanty	Gort
Turra More	67	Kiltartan	Kilbeacanty	Gort
Twentyacres	34	Clare	Killererin	Tuam
**Tynagh**	Town	Leitrim	Tynagh	Portumna
Tynagh	232	Leitrim	Tynagh	Portumna
Tyrone	267	Dunkellin	Drumacoo	Gort
Uggool	1254	Moycullen	Killannin	Galway
Uggool	150	Moycullen	Moycullen	Galway
Ulicksmountain	387	Leitrim	Ballynakill	Loughrea
Ulrith	118	Clare	Killursa	Tuam
Ummeracly East	185	Dunmore	Addergoole	Tuam
Ummeracly West	174	Dunmore	Addergoole	Tuam
Ungwee	655	Ballynahinch	Ballynakill	Clifden
Urkaunbeg	5	Moycullen	Kilcummin	Oughterard
Urkaunmore	8	Moycullen	Kilcummin	Oughterard
Urracly	596	Dunmore	Kilconla	Tuam
Urraghy	635	Clonmacnowen	Clontuskert	Ballinasloe
Ussey	377	Ballymoe	Ballynakill	Glennamaddy
Vicarschoral Land	70	Clare	Tuam	Tuam
Wallscourt	321	Leitrim	Kilreekill	Loughrea
Walsh's Island	3	Clare	Killeany	Tuam
Walsh's Island	2	Clare	Annaghdown	Galway
Walshtown	260	Longford	Killoran	Ballinasloe
Waterdale	679	Clare	Claregalway	Galway
Weir Island	1	Kiltartan	Kinvarradoorus	Gort
Wellpark	58	Leitrim	Ballynakill	Portumna
Wellpark	19	Galway	St. Nicholas	Galway
Weston	270	Clonmacnowen	Ahascragh	Ballinasloe
White Island	33	Ross	Ross	Oughterard
Whitegate	264	Leitrim	Clonrush	Scarriff
Whitegates	28	Longford	Killimorbologue	Portumna
Whitepark	322	Kilconnell	Ballymacward	Ballinasloe
Willyrogue Island	1	Moycullen	Killannin	Oughterard
Windfield	404	Killian	Killian	Mountbellew
Windfield Demesne	691	Tiaquin	Moylough	Mountbellew
Windfield Lower	252	Tiaquin	Moylough	Mountbellew
Windfield Upper	252	Tiaquin	Moylough	Mountbellew
Wood Island	3	Ross	Ross	Oughterard
Woodberry	103	Kilconnell	Killallaghtan	Ballinasloe
Woodbrook	244	Killian	Killian	Mountbellew
Woodfield	1189	Ballymoe	Boyounagh	Glennamaddy
Woodfield	257	Longford	Kilquain	Portumna
Woodford	144	Leitrim	Ballynakill	Loughrea
**Woodfort**	Town	Leitrim	Ballynakill	Loughrea
Woodlands (or Kilhonerush)	116	Longford	Meelick	Portumna
Woodlawn	1368	Kilconnell	Killaan	Ballinasloe
Woodpark	276	Clare	Annaghdown	Galway
Woodpark	201	Leitrim	Inishcaltra	Scarriff
Woodquay	581	Clare	Belclare	Tuam
Wormhole	325	Moycullen	Killannin	Oughterard
Yellow Island	1	Longford	Meelick	Portumna
Yew Islands	1	Longford	Lickmolassy	Portumna
Young's Island	2	Leitrim	Inishcaltra	Scarriff
