= List of townlands of County Clare =

This is a sortable list of townlands of County Clare, Ireland.

Duplicate names occur where there is more than one townland with the same name in the county. Names marked in bold typeface are towns, and the word Town appears for those entries in the Acres column.

== Townland list ==
Townland	Acres	Barony	Civil Parish	Poor law union
Abbey East	301	Burren	Abbey	Ballyvaghan
Abbey West	444	Burren	Abbey	Ballyvaghan
Acres	387	Tulla Upper	Feakle	Tulla
Acres	253	Burren	Drumcreehy	Ballyvaghan
Acres	166	Ibrickan	Kilmacduane	Kilrush
Addergoole	114	Inchiquin	Kilkeedy	Corrofin
Addroon	148	Inchiquin	Ruan	Corrofin
Affick	1,679	Tulla Upper	Tulla	Tulla
Aghaglinny North	521	Burren	Gleninagh	Ballyvaghan
Aghaglinny South	461	Burren	Gleninagh	Ballyvaghan
Aghawinnaun	1,545	Burren	Oughtmama	Ballyvaghan
Aglish	413	Inchiquin	Killinaboy	Corrofin
Ahaclare	218	Tulla Lower	Kilseily	Limerick
Ahaga	215	Clonderalaw	Kilmihil	Kilrush
Aharinaghbeg	411	Tulla Lower	Killokennedy	Limerick
Aharinaghmore	261	Tulla Lower	O'Briensbridge	Limerick
Ahasla	192	Inchiquin	Dysert	Ennis
Aillbrack	169	Ibrickan	Kilfarboy	Ennistimon
Ailldavore	228	Islands	Kilmaley	Ennis
Aillemore	258	Tulla Lower	Killaloe	Limerick
Aillroe Beg	68	Clonderalaw	Kilfiddane	Killadysert
Aillroe More	231	Clonderalaw	Kilfiddane	Killadysert
Aillvaun	52	Tulla Upper	Feakle	Scarriff
Aillwee	801	Burren	Abbey	Ballyvaghan
Alva	178	Moyarta	Kilmacduane	Kilrush
Annagh	524	Ibrickan	Kilmurry	Kilrush
Annagh	272	Tulla Upper	Feakle	Scarriff
Annagh	75	Tulla Upper	Tulla	Tulla
Annagh	68	Inchiquin	Rath	Corrofin
Annaghneal	442	Tulla Upper	Kilnoe	Tulla
Anneville	91	Inchiquin	Killinaboy	Corrofin
Applefort	29	Bunratty Upper	Quin	Tulla
Applevale	201	Inchiquin	Rath	Corrofin
Ardataggle	694	Tulla Lower	O'Briensbridge	Limerick
Ardbooly Lower	54	Tulla Upper	Tulla	Tulla
Ardbooly Upper	68	Tulla Upper	Tulla	Tulla
Ardcarney	178	Bunratty Upper	Templemaley	Ennis
Ardcloony	459	Tulla Lower	Killaloe	Limerick
Ardeamush	163	Corcomroe	Killilagh	Ennistimon
Ardkyle	261	Bunratty Lower	Feenagh	Ennis
Ardmaclancy	194	Bunratty Lower	Kilfinaghta	Tulla
Ardmore	118	Corcomroe	Clooney	Ennistimon
Ardnacraa	109	Corcomroe	Kilmacrehy	Ennistimon
**Ardnacrusha**	Town	Bunratty Lower	St. Patrick's	Limerick
Ardnacullia North	75	Corcomroe	Kilmanaheen	Ennistimon
Ardnacullia South	344	Corcomroe	Kilmanaheen	Ennistimon
Ardnagla	284	Clonderalaw	Kilchreest	Killadysert
Ardnahea	48	Corcomroe	Kilmacrehy	Ennistimon
Ardrush	147	Corcomroe	Clooney	Corrofin
Ardskeagh	263	Tulla Lower	Kilseily	Limerick
Ardsollus	123	Bunratty Upper	Doora	Ennis
Asscarick	1	Bunratty Lower	Clonloghan	Ennis
Athlunkard	196	Bunratty Lower	St. Patrick's	Limerick
Attycristora	290	Corcomroe	Kilmanaheen	Ennistimon
Attyslany North	641	Inchiquin	Kilkeedy	Corrofin
Attyslany South	212	Inchiquin	Kilkeedy	Corrofin
Attyterrila	186	Inchiquin	Dysert	Ennis
Aughagarna	300	Moyarta	Kilmacduane	Kilrush
Aughavinna	71	Corcomroe	Killilagh	Ennistimon
Aughboy	337	Tulla Lower	Kiltenanlea	Limerick
Aughinish	484	Tulla Lower	Ogonnelloe	Scarriff
Aughinish	369	Burren	Oughtmama	Gort
**Aughinish**	Town	Burren	Oughtmama	Gort
Aughiska Beg	264	Corcomroe	Killilagh	Ennistimon
Aughiska More	380	Corcomroe	Killilagh	Ennistimon
Aughrim	616	Inchiquin	Kilkeedy	Corrofin
Aughrim	543	Tulla Upper	Tomgraney	Scarriff
Aughrim (Kelly)	151	Inchiquin	Dysert	Ennis
Aughrim (Ross)	136	Inchiquin	Dysert	Corrofin
Aughrim (Toohy)	144	Inchiquin	Dysert	Corrofin
Ayle Lower	367	Tulla Upper	Feakle	Scarriff
Ayle Upper	229	Tulla Upper	Feakle	Scarriff
Ayleacotty	141	Bunratty Lower	Tomfinlough	Ennis
Ballagh	1,052	Corcomroe	Kilfenora	Ennistimon
Ballagh	73	Bunratty Upper	Quin	Tulla
Ballaghafadda East	113	Islands	Clareabbey	Ennis
Ballaghafadda West	461	Islands	Clareabbey	Ennis
Ballaghaglash	261	Inchiquin	Kilkeedy	Corrofin
Ballaghaline	186	Corcomroe	Killilagh	Ennistimon
Ballaghboy	418	Bunratty Upper	Doora	Ennis
Ballaghboy	101	Inchiquin	Ruan	Corrofin
Ballard	965	Ibrickan	Killard	Kilrush
Ballard	248	Inchiquin	Killinaboy	Corrofin
Balleen	353	Islands	Kilmaley	Ennis
Ballina	553	Clonderalaw	Killofin	Killadysert
Ballingaddy East	510	Corcomroe	Kilmanaheen	Ennistimon
Ballingaddy West	487	Corcomroe	Kilmanaheen	Ennistimon
Ballinlisheen	341	Inchiquin	Kilkeedy	Corrofin
Ballinooskny	190	Bunratty Lower	Clonloghan	Ennis
Ballinooskny	98	Bunratty Lower	Kilmaleery	Ennis
Ballinphunta	374	Bunratty Lower	Kilfintinan	Limerick
Ballinphunta	238	Inchiquin	Killinaboy	Corrofin
Ballinruan	637	Bunratty Upper	Inchicronan	Tulla
Ballintlea North	29	Bunratty Lower	Kilfintinan	Limerick
Ballintlea South	272	Bunratty Lower	Kilfintinan	Limerick
Balliny North	225	Burren	Killonaghan	Ballyvaghan
Balliny South	209	Burren	Killonaghan	Ballyvaghan
Ballyalla	272	Corcomroe	Kilshanny	Ennistimon
Ballyallaban	752	Burren	Rathborney	Ballyvaghan
Ballyallia	295	Bunratty Upper	Templemaley	Ennis
Ballyartney	395	Clonderalaw	Killofin	Killadysert
Ballyasheea	500	Inchiquin	Kilnamona	Ennis
Ballybaun	289	Corcomroe	Kilfenora	Corrofin
Ballybeg	318	Islands	Clareabbey	Ennis
Ballyblood	1,396	Tulla Upper	Tulla	Tulla
Ballybornagh	730	Inchiquin	Kilkeedy	Corrofin
Ballybrack	347	Tulla Lower	O'Briensbridge	Limerick
Ballybran	274	Tulla Lower	Ogonnelloe	Scarriff
Ballybreen	713	Corcomroe	Kilfenora	Ennistimon
Ballybrody	179	Inchiquin	Dysert	Ennis
Ballybroghan	1,368	Tulla Lower	Ogonnelloe	Scarriff
Ballybroughan	116	Bunratty Lower	Kilfintinan	Limerick
Ballycahan	141	Corcomroe	Killilagh	Ennistimon
Ballycahill	519	Burren	Drumcreehy	Ballyvaghan
Ballycally	516	Bunratty Lower	Kilconry	Ennis
Ballycannan	96	Bunratty Lower	St. Patrick's	Limerick
Ballycannan East	219	Bunratty Lower	St. Munchin's	Limerick
Ballycannan North	65	Bunratty Lower	St. Munchin's	Limerick
Ballycannan West	318	Bunratty Lower	St. Munchin's	Limerick
Ballycar	932	Bunratty Lower	Tomfinlough	Ennis
Ballycar North	459	Tulla Lower	O'Briensbridge	Limerick
Ballycar South	357	Tulla Lower	O'Briensbridge	Limerick
Ballycarroll	244	Bunratty Upper	Templemaley	Corrofin
Ballycasey Beg	115	Bunratty Lower	Drumline	Ennis
Ballycasey More	367	Bunratty Lower	Drumline	Ennis
Ballycasheen	332	Inchiquin	Killinaboy	Corrofin
Ballyclancahill	238	Corcomroe	Kilfenora	Corrofin
Ballycloghessy	119	Islands	Clondagad	Killadysert
Ballyconneely	224	Bunratty Lower	Kilnasoolagh	Ennis
Ballyconnoe North	545	Burren	Killeany	Ballyvaghan
Ballyconnoe South	802	Burren	Killeany	Ballyvaghan
Ballyconry	789	Burren	Drumcreehy	Ballyvaghan
Ballyconry	181	Burren	Carran	Ballyvaghan
Ballycorban	857	Tulla Upper	Tomgraney	Scarriff
Ballycorey	156	Bunratty Upper	Templemaley	Ennis
Ballycorick	510	Islands	Clondagad	Killadysert
Ballycorney	347	Tulla Lower	Killaloe	Limerick
Ballycotteen North	904	Corcomroe	Kilmacrehy	Ennistimon
Ballycotteen South	274	Corcomroe	Kilmacrehy	Ennistimon
Ballycrighan	191	Bunratty Upper	Clooney	Ennis
Ballycroum	332	Tulla Upper	Feakle	Tulla
Ballycuggaran	601	Tulla Lower	Killaloe	Scarriff
Ballycullaun	101	Corcomroe	Killilagh	Ennistimon
Ballyculleeny	148	Corcomroe	Clooney	Corrofin
Ballycullen	314	Bunratty Lower	Kilfinaghta	Limerick
Ballycullinan	166	Inchiquin	Dysert	Ennis
Ballycunneen	163	Bunratty Lower	Drumline	Ennis
Ballycurraun	209	Clonderalaw	Kilmurry	Kilrush
Ballydeely	154	Corcomroe	Kilshanny	Ennistimon
Ballydonaghan	1,141	Tulla Upper	Kilnoe	Scarriff
Ballydonohoe	259	Islands	Kilmaley	Ennis
Ballydonohoe	217	Burren	Kilmoon	Ballyvaghan
Ballydoora	36	Burren	Carran	Ballyvaghan
Ballyduff	103	Bunratty Upper	Kilraghtis	Ennis
Ballyduff (Blake)	59	Bunratty Upper	Templemaley	Ennis
Ballyduff (Paterson)	100	Bunratty Upper	Templemaley	Ennis
Ballyduff Beg	612	Inchiquin	Inagh	Ennistimon
Ballyduff More	506	Inchiquin	Inagh	Ennistimon
Ballyduneen	1,080	Clonderalaw	Kilmihil	Kilrush
Ballyea	257	Islands	Killone	Ennis
Ballyea	40	Corcomroe	Kilmacrehy	Ennistimon
Ballyea North	474	Inchiquin	Inagh	Ennistimon
Ballyea South	1,109	Inchiquin	Inagh	Ennistimon
Ballyeighter	470	Inchiquin	Kilkeedy	Corrofin
Ballyellery	256	Corcomroe	Killaspuglonane	Ennistimon
Ballyelly	540	Burren	Killonaghan	Ballyvaghan
Ballyfaudeen	629	Corcomroe	Killaspuglonane	Ennistimon
Ballyfineen	252	Bunratty Lower	St. Patrick's	Limerick
Ballyganner North	644	Burren	Noughaval	Ballyvaghan
Ballyganner South	578	Burren	Noughaval	Corrofin
Ballygarreen	100	Tulla Lower	Killaloe	Scarriff
Ballygassen	200	Bunratty Upper	Inchicronan	Ennis
Ballygastell	503	Burren	Killeany	Ballyvaghan
Ballygeery East	250	Clonderalaw	Killofin	Killadysert
Ballygeery West	229	Clonderalaw	Killofin	Killadysert
Ballygirreen	541	Bunratty Lower	Kilnasoolagh	Ennis
Ballyglass	360	Bunratty Lower	St. Patrick's	Limerick
Ballyglass	252	Bunratty Upper	Doora	Ennis
Ballygoonaun	487	Corcomroe	Kilfenora	Ennistimon
Ballygriffy North	391	Inchiquin	Dysert	Ennis
Ballygriffy South	479	Inchiquin	Dysert	Ennis
Ballyhannan North	184	Bunratty Upper	Quin	Ennis
Ballyhannan South	221	Bunratty Upper	Quin	Ennis
Ballyharraghan	104	Inchiquin	Ruan	Corrofin
Ballyhee	210	Bunratty Upper	Templemaley	Ennis
Ballyheean	136	Corcomroe	Kilmacrehy	Ennistimon
Ballyheefy	243	Tulla Lower	Ogonnelloe	Scarriff
Ballyhehan	492	Burren	Abbey	Ballyvaghan
Ballyhenna	387	Burren	Kilmoon	Ballyvaghan
Ballyhennessy	218	Bunratty Lower	Kilconry	Ennis
Ballyherragh	269	Corcomroe	Kilmacrehy	Ennistimon
Ballyhickey	385	Bunratty Upper	Clooney	Tulla
Ballyhomulta	155	Corcomroe	Kilfenora	Ennistimon
Ballyhurly	225	Tulla Lower	Ogonnelloe	Scarriff
Ballyillaun	491	Islands	Kilmaley	Ennis
Ballyinsheen Beg	157	Burren	Kilmoon	Ballyvaghan
Ballyinsheen More	173	Burren	Kilmoon	Ballyvaghan
Ballykeel North	592	Corcomroe	Kilfenora	Ennistimon
Ballykeel South	424	Corcomroe	Kilfenora	Ennistimon
Ballykeelaun	264	Bunratty Lower	St. Patrick's	Limerick
Ballykelly	821	Tulla Lower	Kilseily	Limerick
Ballykett	1,018	Moyarta	Kilrush	Kilrush
Ballykildea	261	Tulla Lower	Killaloe	Scarriff
Ballykilty	597	Bunratty Upper	Quin	Tulla
Ballykinnacorra North	242	Inchiquin	Rath	Corrofin
Ballykinnacorra South	141	Inchiquin	Rath	Corrofin
Ballykinvarga	174	Corcomroe	Kilfenora	Ennistimon
Ballyknavin	387	Tulla Lower	O'Briensbridge	Limerick
Ballyknock	213	Inchiquin	Kilnamona	Ennis
Ballylaan	235	Corcomroe	Kilmacrehy	Ennistimon
Ballylaghan	516	Tulla Lower	Ogonnelloe	Scarriff
Ballylannidy	193	Islands	Drumcliff	Ennis
Ballyleaan	543	Clonderalaw	Killadysert	Killadysert
Ballyliddan East	64	Bunratty Lower	Kilfintinan	Limerick
Ballyliddan West	222	Bunratty Lower	Kilfintinan	Limerick
Ballyline	499	Bunratty Upper	Kilraghtis	Ennis
Ballyline	137	Burren	Carran	Corrofin
Ballymacahill	292	Bunratty Upper	Kilraghtis	Ennis
Ballymacaula	183	Islands	Drumcliff	Ennis
Ballymacaula	101	Islands	Kilmaley	Ennis
Ballymacdonnell	636	Tulla Lower	Killuran	Tulla
Ballymackea Beg	639	Ibrickan	Kilmurry	Kilrush
Ballymackea More	494	Ibrickan	Kilmurry	Kilrush
Ballymaclinaun	171	Corcomroe	Kilmacrehy	Ennistimon
Ballymacloon East	162	Bunratty Upper	Quin	Tulla
Ballymacloon North	9	Bunratty Upper	Quin	Tulla
Ballymacloon West	123	Bunratty Upper	Quin	Tulla
Ballymacnevin	91	Bunratty Lower	Kilmaleery	Ennis
Ballymaconna	326	Bunratty Upper	Kilraghtis	Ennis
Ballymacooda	513	Islands	Kilmaley	Ennis
Ballymacravan	375	Corcomroe	Kilshanny	Ennistimon
Ballymacrinan	475	Clonderalaw	Killimer	Kilrush
Ballymacrogan East	115	Inchiquin	Ruan	Corrofin
Ballymacrogan West	101	Inchiquin	Ruan	Corrofin
Ballymacurtaun	53	Moyarta	Kilrush	Kilrush
Ballymahony	451	Burren	Noughaval	Ballyvaghan
Ballymaley	342	Bunratty Upper	Templemaley	Ennis
Ballymalone	1,153	Tulla Upper	Tomgraney	Scarriff
Ballymaquiggin	273	Bunratty Upper	Templemaley	Ennis
Ballymarkahan	486	Bunratty Upper	Quin	Tulla
Ballymihil	152	Burren	Kilcorney	Ballyvaghan
Ballyminoge	448	Tulla Upper	Tomgraney	Scarriff
Ballymoloney	783	Tulla Lower	Killokennedy	Limerick
Ballymongaun	104	Inchiquin	Kilnamona	Ennis
Ballymorris	639	Bunratty Lower	Kilfintinan	Limerick
Ballymulcashel	689	Bunratty Lower	Kilfinaghta	Tulla
Ballymulqueeny	176	Bunratty Upper	Templemaley	Ennis
Ballymurphy	452	Burren	Noughaval	Ballyvaghan
Ballymurtagh	77	Bunratty Lower	Clonloghan	Ennis
Ballynabinnia	214	Inchiquin	Kilnamona	Ennis
Ballynabrone	94	Tulla Lower	Killuran	Tulla
Ballynacally	213	Clonderalaw	Kilchreest	Killadysert
**Ballynacally**	Town	Clonderalaw	Kilchreest	Killadysert
Ballynacarragh	563	Corcomroe	Kiltoraght	Ennistimon
Ballynacragga	426	Bunratty Lower	Kilnasoolagh	Ennis
Ballynacragga	201	Clonderalaw	Killadysert	Killadysert
Ballynagard	516	Clonderalaw	Kilchreest	Killadysert
Ballynagleragh	359	Tulla Lower	Ogonnelloe	Scarriff
Ballynagonnaghtagh	317	Inchiquin	Dysert	Ennis
Ballynagranagh	275	Bunratty Upper	Inchicronan	Tulla
Ballynagun East	548	Moyarta	Kilmacduane	Kilrush
Ballynagun West	415	Moyarta	Kilmacduane	Kilrush
Ballynahinch	725	Tulla Upper	Kilnoe	Tulla
Ballynahown	1,041	Corcomroe	Killilagh	Ennistimon
Ballynalackan	340	Corcomroe	Killilagh	Ennistimon
Ballynalackan	162	Corcomroe	Kilmacrehy	Ennistimon
Ballyneillan	166	Inchiquin	Kilnamona	Ennis
Ballyneillan	21	Burren	Kilmoon	Ballyvaghan
Ballynevan	154	Bunratty Lower	Kilfinaghta	Limerick
Ballynew	307	Ibrickan	Kilfarboy	Ennistimon
Ballynoe	524	Inchiquin	Inagh	Ennistimon
Ballynote East	301	Moyarta	Kilrush	Kilrush
Ballynote West	433	Moyarta	Kilrush	Kilrush
Ballyogan	683	Bunratty Upper	Kilraghtis	Ennis
Ballyogan Beg	204	Inchiquin	Ruan	Corrofin
Ballyogan More	527	Inchiquin	Ruan	Corrofin
Ballyonan (or Donaghboy)	775	Moyarta	Kilfearagh	Kilrush
Ballyortla North	109	Bunratty Upper	Doora	Ennis
Ballyortla South	54	Bunratty Upper	Doora	Ennis
Ballyoughtra	283	Tulla Upper	Tulla	Tulla
Ballyoughtra (O'Callaghan)	121	Tulla Upper	Tulla	Tulla
Ballyportry North	455	Inchiquin	Killinaboy	Corrofin
Ballyportry South	284	Inchiquin	Killinaboy	Corrofin
Ballyquin	256	Tulla Upper	Tomgraney	Scarriff
Ballyquin Beg	269	Tulla Lower	Killokennedy	Limerick
Ballyquin More	253	Tulla Lower	Killokennedy	Limerick
Ballyroe	228	Bunratty Lower	Kilfinaghta	Limerick
Ballyroe	74	Bunratty Lower	Kilfintinan	Limerick
Ballyroughan North	113	Bunratty Upper	Quin	Tulla
Ballyroughan South	172	Bunratty Upper	Quin	Tulla
Ballyryan	594	Corcomroe	Killilagh	Ennistimon
Ballysallagh	150	Corcomroe	Killilagh	Ennistimon
Ballysallagh East	400	Bunratty Lower	Kilnasoolagh	Ennis
Ballysallagh West	457	Bunratty Lower	Kilnasoolagh	Ennis
Ballyscanlan	143	Bunratty Upper	Inchicronan	Tulla
Ballyshanny	269	Corcomroe	Kilfenora	Ennistimon
Ballysheen Beg	131	Bunratty Lower	Kilfinaghta	Tulla
Ballysheen More	684	Bunratty Lower	Kilfinaghta	Tulla
Ballyslattery (or Newgrove)	754	Tulla Upper	Tulla	Tulla
Ballysteen	279	Corcomroe	Kilmacrehy	Ennistimon
Ballytarsna	407	Corcomroe	Kilshanny	Ennistimon
Ballyteernau	161	Inchiquin	Dysert	Ennis
Ballyteige	266	Burren	Kilmoon	Ballyvaghan
Ballyteige East	307	Inchiquin	Ruan	Corrofin
Ballyteige West	264	Inchiquin	Ruan	Corrofin
Ballyurra	318	Moyarta	Kilrush	Kilrush
Ballyvaghan	163	Burren	Drumcreehy	Ballyvaghan
**Ballyvaghan**	Town	Burren	Drumcreehy	Ballyvaghan
Ballyvally	373	Tulla Lower	Killaloe	Scarriff
Ballyvanna	266	Bunratty Upper	Inchicronan	Ennis
Ballyvannan	714	Tulla Upper	Tomgraney	Scarriff
Ballyvara	204	Corcomroe	Killilagh	Ennistimon
Ballyvaskin North	482	Ibrickan	Kilfarboy	Ennistimon
Ballyvaskin South	232	Ibrickan	Kilfarboy	Ennistimon
Ballyvelaghan	311	Burren	Abbey	Ballyvaghan
Ballyvergin	288	Bunratty Upper	Clooney	Tulla
Ballyveskil	417	Islands	Clareabbey	Ennis
Ballyvoe	303	Islands	Kilmaley	Ennis
Ballyvoe	246	Corcomroe	Killilagh	Ennistimon
Ballyvohane	301	Clonderalaw	Killadysert	Killadysert
Ballyvonnavaun	316	Islands	Clareabbey	Ennis
Ballyvonnavaun	106	Bunratty Upper	Doora	Ennis
Ballyvorda	207	Corcomroe	Kilmacrehy	Ennistimon
Ballyvorgal Beg	71	Tulla Lower	Clonlea	Limerick
Ballyvorgal North	113	Tulla Lower	Clonlea	Limerick
Ballyvorgal South	306	Tulla Lower	Clonlea	Limerick
Ballyvoughallan	175	Bunratty Lower	Killeely	Limerick
Ballyvranneen	430	Corcomroe	Clooney	Ennistimon
Ballyvrislaun	304	Corcomroe	Kilmacrehy	Ennistimon
Ballyvroghaun Eighter	95	Bunratty Upper	Clooney	Tulla
Ballyvroghaun Oughter	313	Bunratty Upper	Clooney	Tulla
Ballyvullagan	123	Islands	Killone	Ennis
Bannow Island	1	Tulla Lower	Killaloe	Scarriff
Bansha	296	Islands	Killone	Ennis
Barbane	503	Tulla Lower	Killokennedy	Limerick
Barefield (or Gortlumman)	170	Bunratty Upper	Templemaley	Ennis
Barloughra	132	Islands	Killone	Ennis
Barnanaageeha	397	Islands	Killone	Ennis
Barntick	490	Islands	Clareabbey	Ennis
Bartleystown	66	Tulla Lower	Kiltenanlea	Limerick
Battle Island	1	Bunratty Lower	Kilfintinan	Limerick
Baunkyle	475	Inchiquin	Killinaboy	Corrofin
Baunmore	226	Moyarta	Kilfearagh	Kilrush
Bauntlieve	285	Inchiquin	Inagh	Ennistimon
Baur North	123	Burren	Kilcorney	Ballyvaghan
Baur South	111	Burren	Kilcorney	Ballyvaghan
Bauragegaun	769	Tulla Upper	Feakle	Scarriff
Baurroe	440	Tulla Upper	Feakle	Scarriff
**Baurroe**	Town	Tulla Upper	Feakle	Scarriff
Beaghy	150	Corcomroe	Kilmacrehy	Ennistimon
Bealcragga	869	Islands	Kilmaley	Ennis
Bealickania	108	Inchiquin	Ruan	Corrofin
Bealkelly (Eyre)	267	Tulla Lower	Ogonnelloe	Scarriff
Bealkelly (Purdon)	862	Tulla Lower	Ogonnelloe	Scarriff
Bealnalicka	389	Inchiquin	Ruan	Corrofin
Bearnafunshin	342	Bunratty Upper	Kilraghtis	Ennis
Behagh	448	Burren	Oughtmama	Ballyvaghan
Bellia	318	Moyarta	Moyarta	Kilrush
**Bellia**	Town	Moyarta	Moyarta	Kilrush
Belvoir	465	Tulla Lower	Clonlea	Limerick
Belvoir Demesne	348	Tulla Lower	Clonlea	Limerick
Beneden	666	Islands	Clondagad	Killadysert
Berger's Island	7	Clonderalaw	Killadysert	Killadysert
Berneens	627	Burren	Rathborney	Ballyvaghan
Big Venture	4	Bunratty Lower	Kilmaleery	Ennis
Binvoran	794	Clonderalaw	Kilmurry	Killadysert
Bishop's Island	3	Moyarta	Kilfearagh	Kilrush
Bishopsquarter	266	Burren	Drumcreehy	Ballyvaghan
Blackthorn Island	4	Clonderalaw	Killadysert	Killadysert
Blackthorn Island South	2	Clonderalaw	Killadysert	Killadysert
Blackwater	251	Bunratty Lower	St. Patrick's	Limerick
Blakesmountain	525	Burren	Killonaghan	Ballyvaghan
Blean	308	Clonderalaw	Killadysert	Killadysert
Bleanmore	221	Clonderalaw	Kilmurry	Kilrush
Boghil	371	Corcomroe	Kilfenora	Ennistimon
Boheraroan	42	Bunratty Lower	Tomfinlough	Ennis
**Boheraroan**	Town	Bunratty Lower	Tomfinlough	Ennis
Boherboy	325	Corcomroe	Killilagh	Ennistimon
Boherbullog	60	Inchiquin	Rath	Corrofin
Bohyodaun	157	Clonderalaw	Killofin	Killadysert
Bollanacausk	307	Bunratty Lower	Killeely	Limerick
Bollynamiscaun	279	Inchiquin	Inagh	Ennistimon
Bolooghra	1,064	Clonderalaw	Kilfiddane	Killadysert
Boloona	147	Burren	Oughtmama	Ballyvaghan
Boolavaun	178	Inchiquin	Inagh	Ennistimon
Boolinrudda	463	Inchiquin	Inagh	Corrofin
Booltiagh	796	Islands	Kilmaley	Ennis
Booltiaghadine	303	Inchiquin	Killinaboy	Corrofin
Booltydoolan	404	Clonderalaw	Killadysert	Killadysert
Boolybrien	261	Islands	Kilmaley	Ennis
Boolyduff	312	Inchiquin	Inagh	Ennistimon
Boolynagleragh	769	Islands	Kilmaley	Killadysert
Boolynaknockaun	720	Islands	Kilmaley	Ennis
Boolynamweel	770	Clonderalaw	Kilmihil	Kilrush
Boolyneaska	628	Islands	Kilmaley	Ennis
Boston (or Moneennagliggin North)	129	Bunratty Lower	Killeely	Limerick
Bouleevin	944	Inchiquin	Kilkeedy	Corrofin
Breaffy North	243	Ibrickan	Kilfarboy	Ennistimon
Breaffy South	360	Ibrickan	Kilfarboy	Ennistimon
Breaghva	469	Moyarta	Moyarta	Kilrush
Breaghva	383	Islands	Clondagad	Killadysert
Breaghva	325	Clonderalaw	Kilmurry	Kilrush
Breaghva	252	Moyarta	Kilrush	Kilrush
Breaghva East	96	Clonderalaw	Kilchreest	Killadysert
Breaghva West	377	Clonderalaw	Kilchreest	Killadysert
Breckinish	81	Bunratty Lower	Kilmaleery	Ennis
Breckinish	5	Bunratty Lower	Kilmaleery	Ennis
Brickhill East	252	Bunratty Lower	Kilfintinan	Limerick
Brickhill West	564	Bunratty Lower	Kilfintinan	Limerick
**Bridgetown**	Town	Tulla Lower	O'Briensbridge	Limerick
Brisla East	684	Moyarta	Kilmacduane	Kilrush
Brisla West	456	Moyarta	Kilmacduane	Kilrush
**Broadford**	Town	Tulla Lower	Kilseily	Limerick
Bullsfarm	34	Bunratty Lower	Killeely	Limerick
Bunavory	158	Tulla Upper	Tulla	Tulla
Buncraggy	424	Islands	Clareabbey	Ennis
Bunnabinnia North	60	Bunratty Lower	Kilfinaghta	Limerick
Bunnabinnia South	288	Bunratty Lower	Kilfinaghta	Limerick
Bunnahow	157	Bunratty Upper	Inchicronan	Gort
Bunnanagat North	25	Inchiquin	Killinaboy	Corrofin
Bunnanagat South	125	Inchiquin	Killinaboy	Corrofin
Bunnow	191	Bunratty Upper	Doora	Ennis
Bunratty East	394	Bunratty Lower	Bunratty	Ennis
Bunratty West	416	Bunratty Lower	Bunratty	Ennis
Burrane Lower	698	Clonderalaw	Killimer	Kilrush
Burrane Upper	361	Clonderalaw	Killimer	Kilrush
Burren	663	Clonderalaw	Kilchreest	Killadysert
Birrinfadda	945	Clonderalaw	Kilfiddane	Killadysert
Burrenwee	64	Burren	Rathborney	Ballyvaghan
Burtonhill	34	Bunratty Lower	Killeely	Limerick
Bush Island	5	Bunratty Lower	Kilfintinan	Limerick
Bush Island	1	Islands	Clondagad	Killadysert
Bushypark	335	Islands	Drumcliff	Ennis
Caher	587	Bunratty Upper	Inchicronan	Tulla
Caher	372	Tulla Lower	Ogonnelloe	Scarriff
Caher (Murphy)	579	Tulla Upper	Feakle	Scarriff
Caher (Power)	313	Tulla Upper	Feakle	Scarriff
Caher (Rice)	478	Tulla Upper	Feakle	Scarriff
Caher Island	13	Tulla Lower	Ogonnelloe	Scarriff
Caheraderry	368	Corcomroe	Killaspuglonane	Ennistimon
Caheraghacullin	252	Moyarta	Kilmacduane	Kilrush
Caheraphuca	305	Bunratty Upper	Inchicronan	Tulla
Caherbannagh	420	Inchiquin	Kilnamona	Ennis
Caherbarnagh	382	Corcomroe	Kilmacrehy	Ennistimon
Caherbarnagh	183	Burren	Kilmoon	Ennistimon
Caherblonick North	298	Inchiquin	Killinaboy	Corrofin
Caherblonick South	192	Inchiquin	Killinaboy	Corrofin
Caherbullaun	408	Inchiquin	Killinaboy	Corrofin
Caherbullog	1,060	Burren	Kilmoon	Ballyvaghan
Cahercalla	147	Bunratty Upper	Quin	Tulla
Cahercannavan	778	Clonderalaw	Kilmihil	Kilrush
Caherclanchy	131	Inchiquin	Dysert	Ennis
Cahercloggaun	239	Burren	Kilmoon	Ballyvaghan
Caherconnell	260	Burren	Kilcorney	Ballyvaghan
Cahercorcaun	144	Inchiquin	Rath	Corrofin
Caherea	825	Islands	Clondagad	Killadysert
Caherea	29	Islands	Kilmaley	Ennis
Cahereamore	261	Corcomroe	Kilshanny	Ennistimon
Caherfadda	432	Inchiquin	Killinaboy	Corrofin
Caherfeenick North	459	Moyarta	Kilmacduane	Kilrush
Caherfeenick South	469	Moyarta	Kilmacduane	Kilrush
Cahergrillaun	90	Burren	Carran	Ballyvaghan
Caherhurly	2,060	Tulla Upper	Kilnoe	Scarriff
Caherkinallia	284	Corcomroe	Killilagh	Ennistimon
Caherkinallia	179	Corcomroe	Kilshanny	Ennistimon
Caherkine	161	Bunratty Lower	Tomfinlough	Ennis
Caherlean	400	Ibrickan	Killard	Kilrush
Caherloghan	423	Bunratty Upper	Clooney	Tulla
Caherlooskaun	27	Corcomroe	Kilshanny	Ennistimon
Caherlough	350	Inchiquin	Ruan	Corrofin
Cahermaan	427	Burren	Killeany	Ballyvaghan
Cahermackateer	192	Inchiquin	Killinaboy	Corrofin
Cahermackirilla	287	Burren	Carran	Ballyvaghan
Cahermaclanchy	227	Corcomroe	Killilagh	Ennistimon
Cahermacnaghten	734	Burren	Rathborney	Ballyvaghan
Cahermacon	140	Inchiquin	Killinaboy	Corrofin
Cahermacrea	398	Inchiquin	Ruan	Corrofin
Cahermacrusheen	168	Corcomroe	Killilagh	Ennistimon
Cahermacun	152	Burren	Rathborney	Ballyvaghan
Cahermakerrila	471	Burren	Killeany	Ballyvaghan
Caherminnaun East	27	Corcomroe	Kilfenora	Ennistimon
Caherminnaun West	212	Corcomroe	Kilfenora	Corrofin
Cahermore	315	Islands	Kilmaley	Ennis
Cahermurphy	2,419	Clonderalaw	Kilmihil	Kilrush
Cahernalough	177	Bunratty Upper	Kilraghtis	Ennis
Cahernamona	43	Inchiquin	Rath	Corrofin
Caherogan	423	Ibrickan	Kilfarboy	Ennistimon
Caherrush	373	Ibrickan	Kilmurry	Kilrush
Caherscooby	153	Bunratty Lower	Tomfinlough	Ennis
Cahershaughnessy	250	Bunratty Upper	Clooney	Ennis
Cahersherkin	608	Corcomroe	Clooney	Ennistimon
Caherteige	400	Bunratty Lower	Clonloghan	Ennis
Caherycahill	150	Corcomroe	Kilmacrehy	Ennistimon
Caherycoosaun	298	Corcomroe	Kilshanny	Ennistimon
Cahiracon	615	Clonderalaw	Kilfiddane	Killadysert
Cahiracon	506	Clonderalaw	Killadysert	Killadysert
Cahircalla Beg	232	Islands	Drumcliff	Ennis
Cahircalla More	518	Islands	Drumcliff	Ennis
Callahy	512	Tulla Upper	Tomgraney	Scarriff
Calluragh	858	Bunratty Upper	Inchicronan	Tulla
Calluragh	159	Bunratty Lower	Kilfintinan	Limerick
Calluragh East	163	Corcomroe	Kilmanaheen	Ennistimon
Calluragh South	296	Corcomroe	Kilmanaheen	Ennistimon
Calluragh West	134	Corcomroe	Kilmanaheen	Ennistimon
Cammoge	88	Moyarta	Moyarta	Kilrush
Canon Island	270	Clonderalaw	Killadysert	Killadysert
Cant	250	Bunratty Upper	Quin	Tulla
Cappacannaun	681	Tulla Upper	Tomgraney	Scarriff
Cappafeean	375	Bunratty Upper	Inchicronan	Tulla
Cappagarraun	100	Islands	Killone	Ennis
Cappagh	770	Burren	Carran	Ballyvaghan
Cappagh	203	Moyarta	Kilrush	Kilrush
Cappagh Beg	215	Bunratty Upper	Kilraghtis	Ennis
Cappagh More	263	Bunratty Upper	Kilraghtis	Ennis
Cappagh North	187	Bunratty Lower	Kilfinaghta	Ennis
Cappagh South	232	Bunratty Lower	Kilfinaghta	Ennis
Cappaghabaun Mountain	1,254	Tulla Upper	Moynoe	Scarriff
Cappaghabaunpark	684	Tulla Upper	Moynoe	Scarriff
Cappaghcastle	75	Bunratty Lower	Kilfinaghta	Ennis
Cappaghkennedy	413	Burren	Carran	Ballyvaghan
Cappaghlodge	347	Bunratty Lower	Kilfinaghta	Ennis
Cappahard	193	Bunratty Upper	Templemaley	Ennis
Cappakea	452	Tulla Lower	O'Briensbridge	Limerick
Cappalaheen	374	Tulla Lower	Clonlea	Tulla
Cappalea	40	Tulla Lower	Killuran	Tulla
Cappalea North	252	Islands	Kilmaley	Ennis
Cappalea South	186	Islands	Kilmaley	Ennis
Cappamore	192	Bunratty Upper	Inchicronan	Ennis
Cappanageeragh	312	Islands	Clondagad	Killadysert
Cappanakilla	161	Inchiquin	Dysert	Ennis
Cappanalaght	116	Bunratty Lower	Kilfintinan	Limerick
Cappanalaght	86	Bunratty Lower	Kilfinaghta	Limerick
Cappanapeasta	805	Bunratty Upper	Inchicronan	Ennis
Cappanaslish	510	Tulla Lower	Killokennedy	Limerick
Cappanavarnoge	482	Clonderalaw	Killadysert	Killadysert
Capparoe	646	Tulla Upper	Tomgraney	Scarriff
Cappateemore East	260	Bunratty Lower	St. Munchin's	Limerick
Cappateemore West	180	Bunratty Lower	St. Munchin's	Limerick
Cappavilla North	384	Tulla Lower	Kiltenanlea	Limerick
Cappavilla South	159	Tulla Lower	Kiltenanlea	Limerick
Carheen	75	Tulla Upper	Feakle	Scarriff
Carhoo	228	Inchiquin	Dysert	Ennis
Carnaun	638	Corcomroe	Killilagh	Ennistimon
Carnaun	496	Moyarta	Kilrush	Kilrush
Carnaun	147	Inchiquin	Rath	Corrofin
Carncreagh	839	Islands	Kilmaley	Ennis
Carnmallow	129	Bunratty Upper	Quin	Tulla
Carrahan	236	Bunratty Upper	Clooney	Tulla
Carrahil	220	Bunratty Upper	Inchicronan	Ennis
Carran	261	Burren	Carran	Ballyvaghan
**Carrigaholt**	Town	Moyarta	Moyarta	Kilrush
Carrigerry	156	Bunratty Lower	Kilconry	Ennis
Carrigoran	241	Bunratty Lower	Kilnasoolagh	Ennis
Carrow	231	Moyarta	Kilmacduane	Kilrush
Carrow	127	Bunratty Lower	Kilmaleery	Ennis
**Carrowarren**	Town	Islands	Drumcliff	Ennis
Carrowbane	458	Clonderalaw	Kilmurry	Kilrush
Carrowbane	169	Bunratty Lower	Kilmaleery	Ennis
Carrowbaun	615	Tulla Lower	Killaloe	Scarriff
Carrowblough Beg	232	Ibrickan	Killard	Kilrush
Carrowblough More	594	Ibrickan	Killard	Kilrush
Carrowcore	202	Tulla Lower	Ogonnelloe	Scarriff
Carrowcraheen	136	Inchiquin	Kilkeedy	Corrofin
Carrowdotia	229	Bunratty Upper	Kilraghtis	Ennis
Carrowdotia North	323	Clonderalaw	Killimer	Kilrush
Carrowdotia South	472	Clonderalaw	Killimer	Kilrush
Carrowduff	680	Corcomroe	Killaspuglonane	Ennistimon
Carrowduff	604	Ibrickan	Kilmurry	Ennistimon
Carrowduff	296	Corcomroe	Kilshanny	Ennistimon
Carrowduff	206	Inchiquin	Rath	Corrofin
Carrowena	352	Tulla Lower	Ogonnelloe	Scarriff
Carroweragh	552	Corcomroe	Kilshanny	Ennistimon
Carrowfree	551	Moyarta	Kilrush	Kilrush
Carrowgar	294	Bunratty Upper	Quin	Tulla
Carrowgar	281	Corcomroe	Kilmanaheen	Ennistimon
Carrowgar	186	Islands	Clareabbey	Ennis
Carrowgar	175	Tulla Lower	Ogonnelloe	Scarriff
Carrowkeel	278	Corcomroe	Kilshanny	Ennistimon
Carrowkeel	206	Ibrickan	Kilfarboy	Ennistimon
Carrowkeel Beg	104	Bunratty Upper	Inchicronan	Ennis
Carrowkeel East	275	Inchiquin	Inagh	Ennistimon
Carrowkeel More	199	Bunratty Upper	Inchicronan	Ennis
Carrowkeel West	521	Inchiquin	Inagh	Ennistimon
Carrowkilla	226	Clonderalaw	Kilchreest	Killadysert
Carrowlagan	410	Ibrickan	Kilmurry	Kilrush
Carrowmanagh North	210	Corcomroe	Kilshanny	Ennistimon
Carrowmanagh South	294	Corcomroe	Kilshanny	Ennistimon
Carrowmeer	286	Bunratty Upper	Quin	Ennis
Carrowmeer	184	Bunratty Lower	Tomfinlough	Ennis
Carrowmore	384	Ibrickan	Killard	Kilrush
Carrowmore	333	Tulla Upper	Moynoe	Scarriff
Carrowmore	284	Bunratty Lower	Kilfintinan	Limerick
Carrowmore North	347	Ibrickan	Killard	Kilrush
Carrowmore South	2,026	Ibrickan	Killard	Kilrush
Carrownaclogh	413	Corcomroe	Clooney	Ennistimon
Carrownacloghy	302	Bunratty Upper	Inchicronan	Ennis
Carrownagarraun	216	Inchiquin	Rath	Corrofin
Carrownagoul	751	Inchiquin	Kilkeedy	Corrofin
Carrownagowan	986	Tulla Lower	O'Briensbridge	Scarriff
Carrownagry North	358	Ibrickan	Kilmurry	Kilrush
Carrownagry South	293	Ibrickan	Kilmurry	Kilrush
Carrownahooan East	221	Corcomroe	Kilshanny	Ennistimon
Carrownahooan West	219	Corcomroe	Kilshanny	Ennistimon
Carrownakilly	879	Tulla Lower	Killaloe	Scarriff
Carrownakilly	366	Bunratty Lower	Tomfinlough	Ennis
Carrownalegaun	66	Bunratty Lower	Feenagh	Ennis
Carrownamaddra	309	Inchiquin	Killinaboy	Corrofin
Carrownanelly	346	Islands	Clareabbey	Ennis
Carrownaweelaun	847	Moyarta	Moyarta	Kilrush
Carrowncalla North	314	Moyarta	Kilrush	Kilrush
Carrowncalla South	816	Moyarta	Kilrush	Kilrush
Carrownerribul	63	Bunratty Lower	Kilfintinan	Limerick
Carrowniska North	425	Clonderalaw	Kilmurry	Killadysert
Carrowniska South	295	Clonderalaw	Kilmurry	Killadysert
Carrowntedaun	433	Corcomroe	Kilmanaheen	Ennistimon
Carrownycleary	97	Corcomroe	Killilagh	Ennistimon
Carrowreagh East	743	Clonderalaw	Kilfiddane	Killadysert
Carrowreagh West	1,107	Clonderalaw	Kilfiddane	Killadysert
Carrowroe	330	Bunratty Upper	Quin	Tulla
Carrowvere	183	Inchiquin	Rath	Ennistimon
Cartron	36	Burren	Abbey	Ballyvaghan
Cassarnagh	682	Clonderalaw	Kilmurry	Kilrush
Castlebank	372	Bunratty Lower	St. Patrick's	Limerick
Castlecrine	576	Bunratty Lower	Kilfinaghta	Limerick
Castlefergus	376	Bunratty Upper	Doora	Ennis
Castlelake	205	Bunratty Lower	Kilfinaghta	Limerick
Castlepark	644	Clonderalaw	Kilmihil	Kilrush
Castlequarter	361	Inchiquin	Kilkeedy	Corrofin
Castlequarter	211	Bunratty Lower	Kilfintinan	Limerick
Castlequarter	177	Corcomroe	Kilmanaheen	Ennistimon
Castlequarter Kilkeedy	124	Inchiquin	Kilkeedy	Corrofin
Castletown	238	Burren	Carran	Ballyvaghan
Castletown	146	Bunratty Upper	Doora	Ennis
Clab	190	Burren	Carran	Ballyvaghan
**Clare**	Town	Islands	Clareabbey	Ennis
Clare Commons	43	Islands	Clareabbey	Ennis
Clareabbey	231	Islands	Clareabbey	Ennis
Clarefield	432	Moyarta	Moyarta	Kilrush
Clarehill	152	Islands	Clareabbey	Ennis
Claremount	175	Tulla Lower	Killuran	Tulla
Clashduff	295	Tulla Lower	Clonlea	Tulla
Clashmore	50	Tulla Upper	Feakle	Scarriff
Classagh	596	Tulla Lower	Killaloe	Limerick
Claureen	241	Islands	Drumcliff	Ennis
Clenagh	713	Bunratty Lower	Kilmaleery	Ennis
Clifden	477	Inchiquin	Rath	Corrofin
Clogga	171	Bunratty Lower	Kilfinaghta	Limerick
Cloghaun	331	Corcomroe	Killilagh	Ennistimon
Cloghaun	72	Tulla Upper	Tulla	Tulla
Cloghaun Beg	216	Ibrickan	Kilfarboy	Ennistimon
Cloghaun Beg (East)	467	Moyarta	Kilmacduane	Kilrush
Cloghaun Beg (East)	231	Moyarta	Kilmacduane	Kilrush
Cloghaun More	516	Ibrickan	Kilfarboy	Ennistimon
Cloghaun More (East)	588	Moyarta	Kilmacduane	Kilrush
Cloghaun More (West)	559	Moyarta	Kilmacduane	Kilrush
Cloghaunbeg	101	Moyarta	Kilballyowen	Kilrush
Cloghaundine	244	Corcomroe	Kilmacrehy	Ennistimon
Cloghauninchy	455	Ibrickan	Kilmurry	Kilrush
Cloghaunnatinny	271	Ibrickan	Kilmurry	Kilrush
Cloghaunsavaun	573	Moyarta	Kilballyowen	Kilrush
Clogher	1,068	Tulla Upper	Kilnoe	Tulla
Clogher	495	Corcomroe	Kilfenora	Corrofin
Cloghera	278	Tulla Lower	O'Briensbridge	Limerick
Cloghlea	195	Bunratty Lower	Feenagh	Ennis
Cloghleagh	118	Islands	Drumcliff	Ennis
Cloghoolia	424	Tulla Lower	Clonlea	Limerick
Clonboy	270	Tulla Lower	O'Briensbridge	Limerick
Clonbrick	145	Tulla Lower	Clonlea	Tulla
Clonderalaw	463	Clonderalaw	Kilmurry	Killadysert
Clonlea	188	Tulla Lower	Clonlea	Tulla
Clonloghan	401	Bunratty Lower	Clonloghan	Ennis
Clonmoher	474	Tulla Upper	Kilnoe	Scarriff
Clonmoney North	359	Bunratty Lower	Bunratty	Ennis
Clonmoney South	391	Bunratty Lower	Bunratty	Ennis
Clonmoney West	737	Bunratty Lower	Bunratty	Ennis
Clonroad Beg	274	Islands	Drumcliff	Ennis
Clonroad More	654	Islands	Drumcliff	Ennis
Cloona	224	Inchiquin	Dysert	Ennis
Cloonadrum	390	Ibrickan	Kilmurry	Kilrush
Cloonagowan	75	Bunratty Upper	Inchicronan	Ennis
Cloonaherna	251	Bunratty Upper	Quin	Tulla
Cloonaleary	162	Tulla Upper	Tulla	Tulla
Cloonanaha	629	Inchiquin	Inagh	Ennistimon
Cloonanass	113	Bunratty Lower	Kilfinaghta	Tulla
Cloonarass	293	Clonderalaw	Killofin	Killadysert
Cloonaveige	90	Corcomroe	Kilmanaheen	Ennistimon
Cloonawee	60	Bunratty Upper	Doora	Ennis
Cloonawillin	162	Bunratty Upper	Inchicronan	Tulla
Cloonbony	387	Ibrickan	Kilfarboy	Ennistimon
Cloonbooly	252	Islands	Kilmaley	Ennis
Clooncarhy	302	Tulla Lower	Kiltenanlea	Limerick
Clooncaurha	157	Inchiquin	Kilnamona	Ennis
Clooncolman	662	Islands	Clondagad	Killadysert
Cloonconeen	318	Moyarta	Moyarta	Kilrush
Clooncool	368	Tulla Lower	Killuran	Tulla
Clooncoose	431	Burren	Carran	Ballyvaghan
Clooncoul	441	Corcomroe	Kilmanaheen	Ennistimon
Clooncullin	413	Moyarta	Kilmacduane	Kilrush
Cloondanagh	329	Tulla Upper	Tulla	Tulla
Cloondoorney Beg	189	Tulla Upper	Tulla	Tulla
Cloondoorney More	399	Tulla Upper	Tulla	Tulla
Cloondrinagh	923	Clonderalaw	Kilfiddane	Killadysert
Cloondrinagh	423	Islands	Clondagad	Killadysert
Clooneen	464	Corcomroe	Kilfenora	Corrofin
Clooneen	363	Bunratty Upper	Inchicronan	Ennis
Clooneenagh	294	Moyarta	Kilmacduane	Kilrush
Clooney	604	Bunratty Upper	Clooney	Tulla
Clooney North	327	Corcomroe	Clooney	Ennistimon
Clooney South	804	Corcomroe	Clooney	Ennistimon
Clooneybreen	73	Corcomroe	Kilmanaheen	Ennistimon
Clooneylissaun	513	Clonderalaw	Killimer	Kilrush
Clooneyogan North	250	Ibrickan	Kilfarboy	Ennistimon
Clooneyogan South	358	Ibrickan	Kilfarboy	Ennistimon
Cloonfadda	752	Tulla Lower	Killaloe	Scarriff
Cloonfeagh	272	Islands	Drumcliff	Ennis
Cloonfeaghra	94	Inchiquin	Ruan	Corrofin
Cloonfurrihis	224	Clonderalaw	Kilchreest	Killadysert
Cloongaheen East	330	Tulla Lower	Killokennedy	Limerick
Cloongaheen West	931	Tulla Lower	Killokennedy	Limerick
Cloongarve	120	Corcomroe	Kilshanny	Ennistimon
Cloongowna	982	Inchiquin	Kilnamona	Ennis
Cloonkerry	171	Bunratty Upper	Kilraghtis	Ennis
Cloonkerry East	237	Clonderalaw	Killofin	Killadysert
Cloonkerry West	226	Clonderalaw	Killofin	Killadysert
Cloonkett	630	Clonderalaw	Killadysert	Killadysert
Cloonlaheen	141	Islands	Kilmaley	Ennis
Cloonlaheen East	955	Ibrickan	Kilmurry	Kilrush
Cloonlaheen Middle	1,129	Ibrickan	Kilmurry	Kilrush
Cloonlaheen West	721	Ibrickan	Kilmurry	Kilrush
Cloonlara	153	Tulla Lower	Kiltenanlea	Limerick
**Cloonlara**	Town	Tulla Lower	Kiltenanlea	Limerick
Cloonloum Beg	91	Tulla Lower	Clonlea	Tulla
Cloonmackan	161	Inchiquin	Inagh	Ennistimon
Cloonmartin	106	Burren	Rathborney	Ballyvaghan
Cloonmoney	73	Bunratty Upper	Inchicronan	Ennis
Cloonmore	1,154	Ibrickan	Killard	Kilrush
Cloonmore	529	Islands	Clondagad	Killadysert
Cloonmore	123	Bunratty Upper	Doora	Ennis
Cloonmunnia	208	Bunratty Lower	Kilmurry	Tulla
Cloonnagarnaun	702	Ibrickan	Killard	Kilrush
Cloonnagloghaum	112	Inchiquin	Ruan	Corrofin
Cloonnagro	290	Tulla Upper	Feakle	Tulla
Cloonnakilla	246	Clonderalaw	Kilchreest	Killadysert
Cloonnakilla	241	Clonderalaw	Kilmihil	Kilrush
Cloonomra	341	Corcomroe	Kilfenora	Ennistimon
Cloonoughter	129	Bunratty Lower	St. Patrick's	Limerick
Cloonoum More	841	Tulla Lower	Clonlea	Tulla
Cloonreddan	709	Moyarta	Kilmacduane	Kilrush
Cloonselherny	749	Inchiquin	Kilkeedy	Corrofin
Cloonsheerea	221	Tulla Lower	Kilseily	Limerick
Cloonsnaghta	389	Clonderalaw	Killadysert	Killadysert
Cloontabonniv	764	Islands	Kilmaley	Ennis
Cloonteen	175	Bunratty Upper	Templemaley	Ennis
Cloonteen	132	Tulla Upper	Tulla	Tulla
Cloontohil	181	Inchiquin	Dysert	Ennis
Cloontra	681	Tulla Lower	Kilseily	Limerick
Cloontra East	588	Tulla Lower	Kilseily	Limerick
Cloontra West	456	Tulla Lower	Kilseily	Limerick
Cloontymarra	374	Inchiquin	Inagh	Ennistimon
Cloontymurphy	80	Bunratty Upper	Kilraghtis	Ennis
Cloontymweenagh	228	Tulla Upper	Inishcaltra	Scarriff
Cloonulla	594	Clonderalaw	Killadysert	Killadysert
Cloonusker	392	Tulla Upper	Tomgraney	Scarriff
Cloonwhite North	257	Moyarta	Kilmacduane	Kilrush
Cloonwhite South	270	Moyarta	Kilmacduane	Kilrush
Cloonyconry Beg	262	Tulla Lower	Killokennedy	Limerick
Cloonyconry More	418	Tulla Lower	Killokennedy	Limerick
Cloverhill	52	Bunratty Lower	Bunratty	Ennis
Coad	423	Inchiquin	Killinaboy	Corrofin
Cohy	281	Corcomroe	Kilfenora	Ennistimon
Colmanstown	638	Clonderalaw	Killofin	Killadysert
Commonage	144	Corcomroe	Kilfenora	Ennistimon
Commons	676	Tulla Upper	Tulla	Tulla
Commons	414	Burren	Carran	Ballyvaghan
Commons	9	Bunratty Upper	Quin	Tulla
Commons North	425	Inchiquin	Killinaboy	Corrofin
Commons South	635	Inchiquin	Killinaboy	Corrofin
Coney Island	245	Clonderalaw	Killadysert	Killadysert
Cooga	678	Clonderalaw	Killadysert	Killadysert
Cooga	289	Inchiquin	Ruan	Corrofin
Coogaun	107	Bunratty Upper	Quin	Tulla
Cooguquid	86	Inchiquin	Kilnamona	Ennis
Coogypark	74	Tulla Upper	Inishcaltra	Scarriff
Coogyulla	151	Corcomroe	Killilagh	Ennistimon
Coolagh	103	Tulla Lower	Kilseily	Limerick
Coolbaun	290	Inchiquin	Kilkeedy	Corrofin
Coolderry	392	Tulla Lower	Killokennedy	Limerick
Cooldorragha	89	Tulla Upper	Inishcaltra	Scarriff
Cooleabeg	309	Burren	Kilmoon	Ballyvaghan
Cooleagh	205	Burren	Killeany	Ballyvaghan
Coolistoonan	151	Tulla Lower	Clonlea	Tulla
Coollisteige	374	Tulla Lower	Kiltenanlea	Limerick
Coolmeen	1,157	Clonderalaw	Kilfiddane	Killadysert
Coolmeen	186	Burren	Killonaghan	Ballyvaghan
Coolmuinga	357	Moyarta	Kilrush	Kilrush
Coolnahella	135	Tulla Lower	Killuran	Tulla
Coolnalira	209	Tulla Lower	O'Briensbridge	Limerick
Coolnatullagh	368	Burren	Carran	Ballyvaghan
Coolnatullagh	270	Burren	Oughtmama	Ballyvaghan
Coologory	895	Tulla Upper	Tomgraney	Scarriff
Cooloorta	608	Inchiquin	Killinaboy	Corrofin
Coolpeekaun	107	Corcomroe	Kilfenora	Ennistimon
Coolready	294	Tulla Upper	Kilnoe	Scarriff
Coolreagh	615	Tulla Upper	Kilnoe	Scarriff
Coolreagh Beg	455	Tulla Upper	Kilnoe	Scarriff
Coolreagh More	624	Tulla Upper	Kilnoe	Scarriff
Coolshamroge	118	Bunratty Upper	Quin	Ennis
Coolshingaun	260	Inchiquin	Inagh	Ennistimon
Coolsuppeen	217	Clonderalaw	Kilchreest	Killadysert
Coolteengowan	246	Clonderalaw	Killadysert	Killadysert
Coolycasey	514	Bunratty Lower	Kilfinaghta	Limerick
Coor	250	Islands	Drumcliff	Ennis
Coor East	273	Ibrickan	Kilmurry	Kilrush
Coor West	694	Ibrickan	Kilmurry	Kilrush
**Cooraclare**	Town	Moyarta	Kilmacduane	Kilrush
Corbally	778	Moyarta	Kilfearagh	Kilrush
Corbally	505	Bunratty Upper	Clooney	Tulla
Corbehagh	1,042	Tulla Upper	Feakle	Tulla
Core	149	Tulla Upper	Feakle	Scarriff
Corebeg	134	Bunratty Upper	Doora	Ennis
Corkanaknockaun	61	Bunratty Lower	Kilnasoolagh	Ennis
Corlack	108	Bunratty Lower	Bunratty	Ennis
Corlea	593	Bunratty Lower	Kilfinaghta	Limerick
Corlea	294	Tulla Upper	Feakle	Scarriff
Corlea Beg	159	Tulla Upper	Feakle	Scarriff
Corlea More	905	Tulla Upper	Feakle	Scarriff
Corleacommons North	465	Tulla Upper	Feakle	Scarriff
Corleacommons South	387	Tulla Upper	Feakle	Scarriff
Cornfield	105	Clonderalaw	Kilchreest	Killadysert
Corracloon	491	Tulla Upper	Feakle	Scarriff
Corracloon Beg	102	Tulla Upper	Feakle	Scarriff
Corracloon More	635	Tulla Upper	Feakle	Scarriff
Corraige	481	Clonderalaw	Kilmihil	Kilrush
Corrakyle	2,060	Tulla Upper	Tomgraney	Scarriff
Corranroo	99	Burren	Abbey	Ballyvaghan
**Corrofin**	Town	Inchiquin	Killinaboy	Corrofin
Coskeam	499	Burren	Carran	Ballyvaghan
Cottage	88	Tulla Lower	Kiltenanlea	Limerick
Coumbrack	493	Tulla Lower	O'Briensbridge	Limerick
Coumnagun	849	Tulla Lower	Killaloe	Scarriff
Cow Island	2	Islands	Clondagad	Killadysert
Crab Island	1	Corcomroe	Killilagh	Ennistimon
Crag	982	Clonderalaw	Kilfiddane	Kilrush
Crag	571	Tulla Lower	Kilseily	Limerick
Crag	207	Corcomroe	Kilmanaheen	Ennistimon
Crag	195	Clonderalaw	Kilmihil	Kilrush
**Crag**	Town	Burren	Abbey	Ballyvaghan
Cragaweelcross	82	Bunratty Upper	Templemaley	Ennis
Cragballyconoal	322	Burren	Oughtmama	Ballyvaghan
Cragbrien	559	Islands	Clondagad	Killadysert
Cragbwee	192	Bunratty Upper	Quin	Tulla
Cragg	316	Tulla Upper	Tulla	Tulla
Craggagh	209	Burren	Killonaghan	Ballyvaghan
Craggaknock East	371	Ibrickan	Kilmurry	Kilrush
Craggaknock West	389	Ibrickan	Kilmurry	Kilrush
Craggataska	210	Bunratty Upper	Quin	Tulla
Craggaun	270	Ibrickan	Kilmurry	Kilrush
Craggaunboy	288	Inchiquin	Rath	Corrofin
Craggaunkeel	159	Tulla Upper	Tulla	Tulla
Craggaunoween	96	Bunratty Upper	Quin	Tulla
Craggycorradan East	207	Corcomroe	Killilagh	Ennistimon
Craggycorradan West	77	Corcomroe	Killilagh	Ennistimon
Craggykerrivan	232	Islands	Clondagad	Killadysert
Craghera	616	Clonderalaw	Killadysert	Killadysert
Craglea	231	Tulla Lower	Killaloe	Scarriff
Cragleagh	445	Islands	Drumcliff	Ennis
Cragnagower	84	Islands	Drumcliff	Ennis
Cragnarooan	136	Burren	Noughaval	Ballyvaghan
Cragreagh	210	Burren	Kilmoon	Ballyvaghan
Cragroe	386	Tulla Upper	Tulla	Tulla
Cragroe	220	Bunratty Lower	Kilmurry	Tulla
Cranagher	287	Bunratty Upper	Clooney	Ennis
Cratloe	445	Bunratty Lower	Killeely	Limerick
Cratloe	404	Bunratty Lower	Kilfintinan	Limerick
Cratloekeel	466	Bunratty Lower	Killeely	Limerick
Cratloemoyle	548	Bunratty Lower	Killeely	Limerick
Crean	117	Tulla Lower	Killokennedy	Limerick
Creegh North	646	Moyarta	Kilmacduane	Kilrush
Creegh South	488	Moyarta	Kilmacduane	Kilrush
Creehaun	663	Inchiquin	Killinaboy	Corrofin
Creevagh	513	Ibrickan	Kilmurry	Kilrush
Creevagh	305	Burren	Carran	Ballyvaghan
Creevagh Beg	235	Bunratty Upper	Quin	Tulla
Creevagh More	334	Bunratty Upper	Quin	Tulla
Creeveroe	278	Tulla Lower	Killaloe	Scarriff
Cregard	138	Bunratty Upper	Kilraghtis	Ennis
Cregavockoge	124	Burren	Rathborney	Ballyvaghan
Creggaun	212	Bunratty Upper	Doora	Ennis
Creggaun	28	Corcomroe	Kilfenora	Ennistimon
Creggaunnahilla	65	Islands	Clareabbey	Ennis
Creggaunycahill	64	Inchiquin	Kilkeedy	Corrofin
Cregmoher	336	Inchiquin	Rath	Corrofin
Crinnish	153	Clonderalaw	Kilchreest	Killadysert
Croagh North	274	Burren	Rathborney	Ballyvaghan
Croagh South	291	Burren	Rathborney	Ballyvaghan
Croaghaun	129	Inchiquin	Kilnamona	Ennis
Croaghaun	48	Islands	Drumcliff	Ennis
Cronagort East	252	Corcomroe	Killilagh	Ennistimon
Cronagort West	237	Corcomroe	Killilagh	Ennistimon
Cross	543	Moyarta	Kilballyowen	Kilrush
Cross	110	Inchiquin	Kilkeedy	Corrofin
Cross Beg	384	Clonderalaw	Kilmurry	Killadysert
Cross More	653	Clonderalaw	Kilmurry	Killadysert
Crossagh	247	Bunratty Lower	Drumline	Ennis
Crossard	131	Inchiquin	Killinaboy	Corrofin
Crosscornaum	124	Corcomroe	Kilshanny	Ennistimon
Crossderry	531	Clonderalaw	Killadysert	Killadysert
Crossderry	89	Tulla Upper	Feakle	Scarriff
Crovraghan	524	Clonderalaw	Killadysert	Killadysert
Crow Island	1	Bunratty Lower	Kilnasoolagh	Ennis
Crughwill	183	Burren	Carran	Ballyvaghan
Crumlin	945	Burren	Killonaghan	Ballyvaghan
Crusheen	86	Bunratty Upper	Inchicronan	Ennis
Cullaun	419	Bunratty Upper	Quin	Tulla
Cullaun	269	Burren	Rathborney	Ballyvaghan
Culleen	233	Bunratty Lower	Drumline	Ennis
Culleen	219	Inchiquin	Kilkeedy	Corrofin
Culleen	168	Islands	Kilmaley	Ennis
Cullenagh	406	Corcomroe	Clooney	Ennistimon
Cullenagh	393	Clonderalaw	Killofin	Killadysert
Cullenagh	119	Bunratty Upper	Quin	Tulla
Cullenagh	86	Bunratty Upper	Kilraghtis	Ennis
Curraderra	500	Bunratty Upper	Kilraghtis	Ennis
Curragh	278	Tulla Upper	Feakle	Scarriff
Curraghadoo	132	Corcomroe	Killaspuglonane	Ennistimon
Curraghkilleen	74	Bunratty Lower	Kilfinaghta	Tulla
Curraghmoghaun	112	Bunratty Upper	Clooney	Ennis
Curraghodea	698	Inchiquin	Inagh	Ennistimon
Cushacorra	41	Inchiquin	Kilkeedy	Corrofin
Cutteen	207	Bunratty Upper	Quin	Tulla
Cutteen Beg	107	Tulla Upper	Tulla	Tulla
Cutteen More	176	Tulla Upper	Tulla	Tulla
Dabrian	72	Inchiquin	Killinaboy	Corrofin
Dangan	813	Burren	Drumcreehy	Ballyvaghan
Dangan	756	Bunratty Upper	Quin	Tulla
Dangananella East	678	Moyarta	Kilmacduane	Kilrush
Dangananella West	490	Moyarta	Kilmacduane	Kilrush
Danganbrack	186	Bunratty Upper	Quin	Tulla
Darragh North	362	Islands	Killone	Ennis
Darragh South	151	Islands	Killone	Ennis
Deelin Beg	320	Burren	Oughtmama	Ballyvaghan
Deelin More	630	Burren	Oughtmama	Ballyvaghan
Deenish Island	43	Bunratty Lower	Kilmaleery	Ennis
Deerisland (or Inishmore)	443	Clonderalaw	Kilchreest	Killadysert
Deerpark	178	Bunratty Upper	Doora	Ennis
Deerpark	165	Burren	Noughaval	Corrofin
Deerpark	116	Bunratty Lower	Feenagh	Ennis
Deerpark	65	Bunratty Lower	Bunratty	Ennis
Deerpark Lower	33	Corcomroe	Kilmanaheen	Ennistimon
Deerpark Middle	31	Corcomroe	Kilmanaheen	Ennistimon
Deerpark North	126	Bunratty Upper	Quin	Tulla
Deerpark South	12	Bunratty Upper	Quin	Tulla
Deerpark Upper	74	Corcomroe	Kilmanaheen	Ennistimon
Deerpark West	184	Corcomroe	Kilmanaheen	Ennistimon
Dehomad	1,920	Islands	Clondagad	Killadysert
Dereen South	210	Burren	Killonaghan	Ballyvaghan
Dernish Island	7	Bunratty Lower	Kilconry	Ennis
Derreen	375	Clonderalaw	Kilmurry	Kilrush
Derreen	217	Ibrickan	Kilmurry	Kilrush
Derreen	186	Corcomroe	Kilmacrehy	Ennistimon
Derreen	181	Islands	Clareabbey	Ennis
Derreen	169	Corcomroe	Kilshanny	Ennistimon
Derreen East	101	Burren	Killonaghan	Ballyvaghan
Derreen West	347	Burren	Killonaghan	Ballyvaghan
Derreenatloghtan	336	Inchiquin	Kilkeedy	Corrofin
Derreendooagh	105	Tulla Upper	Feakle	Tulla
Derrinidden	344	Clonderalaw	Kilfiddane	Killadysert
Derroolagh	143	Inchiquin	Kilnamona	Ennis
Derry	376	Inchiquin	Inagh	Ennistimon
Derry	190	Bunratty Upper	Templemaley	Ennis
Derry	110	Tulla Lower	Kilseily	Limerick
Derry More	489	Bunratty Lower	Killeely	Limerick
Derryabbert	77	Tulla Upper	Feakle	Scarriff
Derrybeg	47	Bunratty Lower	Killeely	Limerick
Derrybehagh	65	Tulla Upper	Feakle	Scarriff
Derrybrick	320	Clonderalaw	Kilmurry	Killadysert
Derrycalliff	1,196	Bunratty Upper	Clooney	Tulla
Derrycarran	99	Tulla Upper	Feakle	Tulla
Derrycnaw	595	Tulla Upper	Feakle	Scarriff
Derryeaghra	80	Tulla Upper	Feakle	Scarriff
Derryfadda	461	Tulla Lower	Kiltenanlea	Limerick
Derryfadda	237	Tulla Lower	Feakle	Tulla
Derrygarriff	347	Bunratty Upper	Inchicronan	Ennis
Derrygeeha	437	Clonderalaw	Kilfiddane	Killadysert
Derrygravaun	54	Tulla Upper	Feakle	Scarriff
Derryharriv	255	Inchiquin	Inagh	Ennistimon
Derrykeadgran	80	Tulla Upper	Tulla	Tulla
Derrylea	352	Clonderalaw	Killadysert	Killadysert
Derrylough	236	Clonderalaw	Killimer	Kilrush
Derrylumman	92	Inchiquin	Kilkeedy	Corrofin
Derrymore	395	Bunratty Lower	Inchicronan	Tulla
Derrymore	128	Corcomroe	Clooney	Ennistimon
Derrymore East	535	Tulla Upper	Tulla	Tulla
Derrymore West	615	Tulla Upper	Tulla	Tulla
Derrynacarragh	206	Islands	Kilmaley	Ennis
Derrynageeha	259	Clonderalaw	Kilfiddane	Killadysert
Derrynagittagh (Purcell)	153	Tulla Upper	Feakle	Scarriff
Derrynagittagh Naughton	115	Tulla Upper	Feakle	Scarriff
Derrynagleragh	73	Bunratty Upper	Inchicronan	Ennis
Derrynaheila	264	Tulla Upper	Feakle	Scarriff
Derrynaheila	108	Corcomroe	Kiltoraght	Corrofin
Derrynalecka	392	Clonderalaw	Kilmurry	Killadysert
Derrynalecka	354	Clonderalaw	Kilfiddane	Killadysert
Derrynaneal	182	Tulla Upper	Feakle	Scarriff
Derrynavahagh	570	Burren	Kilmoon	Ballyvaghan
Derrynaveagh	876	Tulla Lower	Clonlea	Limerick
Derrynaveagh	50	Tulla Upper	Feakle	Tulla
Derryowen	263	Inchiquin	Kilkeedy	Corrofin
Derryshaan	338	Clonderalaw	Kilfiddane	Killadysert
Derryulk	90	Tulla Upper	Tulla	Tulla
Derryulk Lower	108	Tulla Upper	Tulla	Tulla
Derryulk Middle	193	Tulla Upper	Tulla	Tulla
Derryulk Upper	421	Tulla Upper	Tulla	Tulla
Derryvet	657	Bunratty Upper	Inchicronan	Tulla
Derryvinna	52	Tulla Upper	Feakle	Scarriff
Derryvinnaan	271	Tulla Lower	Kilseily	Limerick
Derrywillin	75	Tulla Upper	Feakle	Scarriff
Donnybrook	71	Bunratty Lower	Feenagh	Ennis
Dooglaun	342	Tulla Upper	Feakle	Tulla
Doolin	238	Corcomroe	Killilagh	Ennistimon
Doolough	1,925	Ibrickan	Kilmurry	Kilrush
Doon	694	Bunratty Upper	Inchicronan	Gort
Doon	253	Corcomroe	Kilfenora	Ennistimon
Doon	118	Tulla Lower	Kilseily	Limerick
Doon	97	Tulla Lower	Killuran	Tulla
Doon Beg	1,310	Ibrickan	Killard	Kilrush
Doon Island	2	Clonderalaw	Killadysert	Killadysert
Doonaboy (or Ballyonan)	775	Moyarta	Kilfearagh	Kilrush
**Doonaha**	Town	Moyarta	Moyarta	Kilrush
Doonaha East	450	Moyarta	Moyarta	Kilrush
Doonaha West	747	Moyarta	Moyarta	Kilrush
Doonass	263	Tulla Lower	Kiltenanlea	Limerick
Doonass Demesne	263	Tulla Lower	Kiltenanlea	Limerick
Doonaun	145	Tulla Upper	Tulla	Tulla
**Doonbeg**	Town	Ibrickan	Killard	Kilrush
Dooneen	313	Burren	Abbey	Ballyvaghan
Dooneen	49	Bunratty Upper	Doora	Ennis
Doonmacfelim	186	Corcomroe	Killilagh	Ennistimon
Doonmore	1,545	Ibrickan	Killard	Kilrush
Doonnagore	619	Corcomroe	Killilagh	Ennistimon
Doonnagurroge	695	Clonderalaw	Killimer	Kilrush
Doonogan	1,043	Clonderalaw	Killimer	Kilrush
Doonsallagh East	919	Ibrickan	Kilmurry	Ennistimon
Doonsallagh West	454	Ibrickan	Kilmurry	Ennistimon
Doonyvardan	344	Burren	Rathborney	Ballyvaghan
Doorus	141	Tulla Lower	Killuran	Tulla
Doorus East	259	Tulla Upper	Feakle	Tulla
Doorus West	165	Tulla Upper	Feakle	Tulla
Dough	958	Moyarta	Kilfearagh	Kilrush
Dough	702	Corcomroe	Kilmacrehy	Ennistimon
Dough	248	Ibrickan	Kilfarboy	Ennistimon
Drewsborough	518	Tulla Upper	Tomgraney	Scarriff
Drim	217	Bunratty Upper	Doora	Ennis
Drimmeen	248	Tulla Lower	Killuran	Tulla
Drimmeennagun	162	Tulla Lower	Killuran	Tulla
Drimna	68	Moyarta	Kilrush	Kilrush
Drinagh	484	Inchiquin	Rath	Ennistimon
Dromeen	159	Inchiquin	Ruan	Corrofin
Dromintobin North	118	Tulla Lower	Kiltenanlea	Limerick
Dromintobin South	75	Tulla Lower	Kiltenanlea	Limerick
Dromoland	812	Bunratty Lower	Kilnasoolagh	Ennis
Dromore	1,018	Inchiquin	Ruan	Corrofin
Dromore	105	Tulla Upper	Feakle	Scarriff
Drumadrehid	255	Islands	Killone	Ennis
Drumandoora	854	Tulla Upper	Feakle	Tulla
Drumanure	320	Islands	Kilmaley	Ennis
Drumanure	224	Inchiquin	Inagh	Ennistimon
Drumatehy	193	Islands	Kilmaley	Ennis
Drumbaun	241	Ibrickan	Kilfarboy	Ennistimon
Drumbiggil	204	Islands	Drumcliff	Ennis
Drumbonniv	336	Bunratty Upper	Inchicronan	Tulla
Drumbrickaun	59	Burren	Rathborney	Ballyvaghan
Drumcaran Beg	91	Islands	Drumcliff	Ennis
Drumcaran More	180	Islands	Drumcliff	Ennis
Drumcarna	171	Inchiquin	Inagh	Ennistimon
Drumcavan	230	Inchiquin	Ruan	Corrofin
Drumcharley	183	Tulla Upper	Tulla	Tulla
Drumcliff	1,105	Islands	Drumcliff	Ennis
Drumcore	259	Bunratty Upper	Inchicronan	Gort
Drumcullaun	347	Inchiquin	Inagh	Ennistimon
Drumcurreen	195	Inchiquin	Dysert	Ennis
Drumdigus	791	Clonderalaw	Kilmurry	Killadysert
Drumdoolaghty	71	Bunratty Upper	Doora	Ennis
Drumduff	206	Inchiquin	Inagh	Ennistimon
Drumeevin	522	Corcomroe	Kiltoraght	Corrofin
Drumellihy (Cunningham)	921	Moyarta	Kilmacduane	Kilrush
Drumellihy (MacDonnell)	479	Moyarta	Kilmacduane	Kilrush
Drumellihy (Westby)	853	Moyarta	Kilmacduane	Kilrush
Drumellihy (Westropp)	599	Moyarta	Kilmacduane	Kilrush
Drumgeely	216	Bunratty Lower	Clonloghan	Ennis
Drumgloon	208	Bunratty Upper	Kilraghtis	Ennis
Drumgramph	89	Bunratty Upper	Kilraghtis	Ennis
Druminshin	137	Inchiquin	Dysert	Ennis
Drumlesh	243	Inchiquin	Inagh	Ennistimon
Drumline	879	Bunratty Lower	Drumline	Ennis
Drummaghmartin	156	Tulla Upper	Tulla	Tulla
Drummanneen	253	Bunratty Upper	Inchicronan	Ennis
Drummeen	110	Tulla Lower	Kiltenanlea	Limerick
Drummeen East	104	Islands	Killone	Ennis
Drummeen West	106	Islands	Killone	Ennis
Drummeer	191	Inchiquin	Dysert	Ennis
Drummin	1,016	Ibrickan	Kilmurry	Kilrush
Drummin	571	Tulla Upper	Feakle	Scarriff
Drummin	330	Ibrickan	Kilfarboy	Ennistimon
Drummin	297	Tulla Lower	Killuran	Limerick
Drummin	196	Bunratty Lower	St. Patrick's	Limerick
Drummin	114	Tulla Lower	Kilseily	Limerick
Drummina	189	Inchiquin	Dysert	Ennis
Drumminacknew	260	Bunratty Upper	Inchicronan	Ennis
Drumminakela	154	Tulla Lower	Kilseily	Limerick
Drumminnagran	102	Corcomroe	Kilshanny	Ennistimon
Drumminnanav	202	Tulla Upper	Feakle	Scarriff
Drummod	1,013	Tulla Upper	Kilnoe	Scarriff
Drummoher	465	Inchiquin	Killinaboy	Corrofin
Drumnadeevna	242	Inchiquin	Kilkeedy	Corrofin
Drumnagah	195	Inchiquin	Inagh	Ennistimon
Drumquin	257	Islands	Clondagad	Killadysert
Drumquin	243	Bunratty Upper	Kilraghtis	Ennis
Drumsallagh	97	Bunratty Upper	Inchicronan	Ennis
Drumsillagh (or Sallybank (Merritt))	523	Tulla Lower	Kilseily	Limerick
Drumsillagh (or Sallybank (Parker))	588	Tulla Lower	Kilseily	Limerick
Drumullan	366	Bunratty Lower	Kilmurry	Tulla
Drumullan	93	Tulla Upper	Tulla	Tulla
Drumumna	494	Bunratty Upper	Inchicronan	Ennis
Dulick	232	Bunratty Upper	Templemaley	Ennis
Dunneill	416	Clonderalaw	Killimer	Kilrush
Durha	235	Moyarta	Kilrush	Kilrush
Durra	29	Bunratty Upper	Inchicronan	Tulla
Dysert	327	Clonderalaw	Killimer	Kilrush
Dysert	80	Inchiquin	Dysert	Ennis
Eantybeg North	113	Burren	Kilcorney	Ballyvaghan
Eantybeg South	117	Burren	Kilcorney	Ballyvaghan
Eantymore	467	Burren	Kilcorney	Ballyvaghan
Earlhill	99	Tulla Lower	O'Briensbridge	Limerick
Edenvale	148	Islands	Killone	Ennis
Effernan	638	Clonderalaw	Kilfiddane	Killadysert
Einagh	1,085	Ibrickan	Killard	Kilrush
Elmhill	69	Tulla Lower	Killuran	Tulla
Elmvale	105	Inchiquin	Killinaboy	Corrofin
Emlagh	285	Moyarta	Kilfearagh	Kilrush
Emlagh	154	Ibrickan	Kilmurry	Kilrush
Enagh East	152	Tulla Lower	Clonlea	Tulla
Enagh North	120	Tulla Lower	Clonlea	Tulla
Enagh West	300	Tulla Lower	Clonlea	Tulla
Ennistimon	79	Corcomroe	Kilmanaheen	Ennistimon
Erinagh Beg	144	Inchiquin	Dysert	Ennis
Erinagh More	257	Inchiquin	Dysert	Ennis
Erribul	860	Clonderalaw	Kilfiddane	Killadysert
Errina	334	Tulla Lower	Kiltenanlea	Limerick
Errinagh	228	Tulla Upper	Feakle	Scarriff
Eyrehill	100	Tulla Upper	Tulla	Tulla
Fahanlunaghta Beg	257	Corcomroe	Kilmanaheen	Ennistimon
Fahanlunaghta More	205	Corcomroe	Kilmanaheen	Ennistimon
Fahee North	856	Burren	Carran	Ballyvaghan
Fahee South	539	Burren	Carran	Ballyvaghan
Faherlaghroe	72	Burren	Kilcorney	Ballyvaghan
Fahy	1,638	Tulla Upper	Feakle	Tulla
Fahy Beg	623	Tulla Lower	O'Briensbridge	Limerick
Fahy More North	244	Tulla Lower	O'Briensbridge	Limerick
Fahy More South	472	Tulla Lower	O'Briensbridge	Limerick
Fairhill	143	Tulla Upper	Feakle	Scarriff
Fairyhill	9	Bunratty Lower	St. Patrick's	Limerick
Fanaleen	16	Corcomroe	Kilshanny	Ennistimon
Fanore Beg	49	Burren	Killonaghan	Ballyvaghan
Fanore More	1,175	Burren	Killonaghan	Ballyvaghan
Fanta Glebe	375	Corcomroe	Kilfenora	Ennistimon
Fanygalvan	245	Burren	Carran	Ballyvaghan
Farrihy	584	Moyarta	Kilfearagh	Kilrush
Faunarooska	536	Burren	Rathborney	Ballyvaghan
Faunarooska	232	Burren	Killonaghan	Ballyvaghan
Faunrusk	115	Bunratty Upper	Templemaley	Ennis
Feagarroge	298	Moyarta	Kilrush	Kilrush
Feagh	132	Islands	Clareabbey	Ennis
Feaghquin	187	Bunratty Upper	Quin	Tulla
Feagreen	324	Corcomroe	Clooney	Ennistimon
Feakle	1,151	Tulla Upper	Feakle	Scarriff
**Feakle**	Town	Tulla Upper	Feakle	Scarriff
Feeard	653	Moyarta	Kilballyowen	Kilrush
Feenagh	367	Burren	Rathborney	Ballyvaghan
Feenagh	51	Bunratty Upper	Clooney	Tulla
Feenagh (Moloney)	258	Bunratty Lower	Feenagh	Ennis
Feenagh (Wilson)	254	Bunratty Lower	Feenagh	Ennis
Feenish	177	Bunratty Lower	Kilconry	Ennis
Feenlea	486	Tulla Lower	Killaloe	Scarriff
Feighroe	505	Islands	Kilmaley	Ennis
Fergus Island	1	Bunratty Lower	Drumline	Ennis
Fermoyle West	700	Burren	Killonaghan	Ballyvaghan
Finanagh	175	Bunratty Upper	Doora	Ennis
**Finavarra**	Town	Burren	Oughtmama	Ballyvaghan
Finavarra Demesne	86	Burren	Oughtmama	Ballyvaghan
Finlough	409	Bunratty Lower	Tomfinlough	Ennis
Finnor Beg	306	Ibrickan	Kilmurry	Kilrush
Finnor More	421	Ibrickan	Kilmurry	Kilrush
Fintra Beg	387	Ibrickan	Kilfarboy	Ennistimon
Fintra More	389	Ibrickan	Kilfarboy	Ennistimon
Firgrove	158	Bunratty Lower	Drumline	Ennis
**Fisherstreet**	Town	Corcomroe	Killilagh	Ennistimon
Flagmount	201	Tulla Upper	Feakle	Scarriff
Fodry	453	Moyarta	Kilballyowen	Kilrush
Foilrim	143	Inchiquin	Ruan	Corrofin
Fomerla	308	Tulla Upper	Tulla	Tulla
Foohagh	305	Moyarta	Kilfearagh	Kilrush
Formoyle Beg	254	Tulla Lower	Killokennedy	Limerick
Formoyle East	847	Burren	Killonaghan	Ballyvaghan
Formoyle Eighteragh E	465	Inchiquin	Inagh	Ennistimon
Formoyle Eighteragh W	562	Inchiquin	Inagh	Ennistimon
Formoyle More	340	Tulla Lower	Killokennedy	Limerick
Formoyle Oughteragh E	554	Inchiquin	Inagh	Ennistimon
Formoyle Oughteragh W	621	Inchiquin	Inagh	Ennistimon
Formoyle West	700	Burren	Killonaghan	Ballyvaghan
Fortane Beg	467	Tulla Upper	Tulla	Tulla
Fortane More	292	Tulla Upper	Tulla	Tulla
Fortfergus	178	Clonderalaw	Kilchreest	Killadysert
Fortwilliam	103	Bunratty Lower	Kilfintinan	Limerick
Fortwilliam	76	Bunratty Lower	Kilfinaghta	Limerick
Fossa Beg	573	Tulla Upper	Tomgraney	Scarriff
Fossa More	810	Tulla Upper	Tomgraney	Scarriff
Fountain	211	Islands	Drumcliff	Ennis
Foxandgeese	113	Tulla Lower	Killuran	Tulla
Freagh Island	1	Ibrickan	Kilfarboy	Ennistimon
Freaghavalean	331	Ibrickan	Kilfarboy	Ennistimon
Freaghcastle	389	Ibrickan	Kilfarboy	Ennistimon
Furhee	66	Tulla Upper	Tulla	Tulla
Furraglaun	241	Corcomroe	Kilmanaheen	Ennistimon
Furroor	2,786	Islands	Clondagad	Killadysert
Furroor	851	Islands	Kilmaley	Ennis
Furroor Lower	307	Moyarta	Moyarta	Kilrush
Furroor Upper	223	Moyarta	Moyarta	Kilrush
Gallowshill	267	Bunratty Lower	Kilfintinan	Limerick
Garracloon	99	Burren	Rathborney	Ballyvaghan
Garraun	299	Tulla Upper	Feakle	Scarriff
Garraun	277	Corcomroe	Clooney	Ennistimon
Garraun	264	Tulla Lower	Kiltenanlea	Limerick
Garraun	230	Moyarta	Kilfearagh	Kilrush
Garraun	37	Bunratty Lower	St. Patrick's	Limerick
Garraunboy	312	Tulla Lower	Killaloe	Scarriff
Garraunnatooha	286	Moyarta	Kilmacduane	Kilrush
Garruragh	838	Tulla Upper	Tulla	Tulla
Garrynagry	398	Islands	Kilmaley	Ennis
Garrynamona	176	Bunratty Lower	Kilconry	Ennis
Garryncallaha	108	Inchiquin	Kilkeedy	Corrofin
Garryncurra	259	Bunratty Lower	Kilfintinan	Limerick
Garvillaun	412	Inchiquin	Inagh	Ennistimon
Garvillaun	281	Inchiquin	Ruan	Corrofin
Garvoghil	242	Inchiquin	Inagh	Ennistimon
Gaurus	167	Bunratty Upper	Doora	Ennis
Gilloge	163	Tulla Lower	Kiltenanlea	Limerick
Glascloon	702	Ibrickan	Killard	Kilrush
Glasha Beg	281	Corcomroe	Killilagh	Ennistimon
Glasha More	252	Corcomroe	Killilagh	Ennistimon
Glebe	63	Corcomroe	Kilmanaheen	Ennistimon
Glen North	132	Corcomroe	Clooney	Ennistimon
Glen South	94	Corcomroe	Clooney	Ennistimon
Glenbonniv	436	Tulla Upper	Feakle	Scarriff
Glencolumbkille North	595	Burren	Carran	Ballyvaghan
Glencolumbkille South	396	Burren	Carran	Ballyvaghan
Glenconaun Beg	152	Clonderalaw	Killadysert	Killadysert
Glenconaun More	782	Clonderalaw	Killadysert	Killadysert
Glendine North	492	Ibrickan	Kilfarboy	Ennistimon
Glendine South	320	Ibrickan	Kilfarboy	Ennistimon
Glendree	2,564	Tulla Upper	Tulla	Tulla
Gleninagh North	486	Burren	Gleninagh	Ballyvaghan
Gleninagh South	635	Burren	Gleninagh	Ballyvaghan
Gleninsheen	595	Burren	Rathborney	Ballyvaghan
Glenletternafinny	387	Islands	Kilmaley	Ennis
Glenlon North	175	Tulla Lower	O'Briensbridge	Limerick
Glenlon South	172	Tulla Lower	O'Briensbridge	Limerick
Glenmore	2,054	Clonderalaw	Kilmihil	Kilrush
Glennageer	844	Inchiquin	Inagh	Ennistimon
Glennagross	928	Bunratty Lower	St. Munchin's	Limerick
Glenquin	1,004	Inchiquin	Killinaboy	Corrofin
Glensleade	212	Burren	Kilcorney	Ballyvaghan
Glenwood	61	Tulla Lower	Clonlea	Limerick
Goose Island	1	Tulla Lower	O'Briensbridge	Limerick
Gortaclare	722	Burren	Oughtmama	Ballyvaghan
Gortaclob	174	Corcomroe	Killilagh	Ennistimon
Gortacullin	515	Tulla Lower	Kilseily	Limerick
Gortaderry	1,718	Tulla Upper	Tomgraney	Scarriff
Gortadroma	135	Tulla Lower	Clonlea	Tulla
Gortaficka	301	Bunratty Upper	Inchicronan	Ennis
Gortaganniv	354	Islands	Kilmaley	Ennis
Gortalassa	116	Tulla Upper	Feakle	Scarriff
Gortalougha	6	Inchiquin	Inagh	Ennistimon
Gortaniska	305	Bunratty Upper	Inchicronan	Ennis
Gortataggart	24	Bunratty Upper	Doora	Ennis
Gortatoger	148	Bunratty Lower	St. Patrick's	Limerick
Gortatrassa	484	Tulla Lower	Killuran	Limerick
Gortaveha	1,072	Tulla Upper	Feakle	Tulla
Gortavrulla	520	Tulla Upper	Feakle	Scarriff
Gortbofarna	467	Inchiquin	Inagh	Ennistimon
Gortboyheen	215	Burren	Oughtmama	Ballyvaghan
Gortcallyroe	263	Tulla Lower	Killaloe	Scarriff
Gortcooldurrin	88	Inchiquin	Rath	Corrofin
Gortcurka	344	Inchiquin	Dysert	Ennis
Gorteen	445	Bunratty Upper	Quin	Tulla
Gorteen	256	Bunratty Upper	Doora	Ennis
Gorteen	43	Inchiquin	Ruan	Corrofin
Gorteenaneelig	158	Tulla Upper	Tulla	Tulla
Gorteenmacnamara	309	Corcomroe	Clooney	Ennistimon
Gorteennaguppoge	107	Tulla Upper	Tulla	Tulla
Gorteenreagh	207	Tulla Upper	Feakle	Scarriff
Gortgarraun	267	Bunratty Lower	St. Munchin's	Limerick
Gortkeel	40	Corcomroe	Clooney	Corrofin
Gortlecka	895	Inchiquin	Killinaboy	Corrofin
Gortlumman (or Barefield)	170	Bunratty Upper	Templemaley	Ennis
Gortlurkaun	89	Bunratty Upper	Inchicronan	Ennis
Gortmagy	706	Tulla Lower	Killaloe	Scarriff
Gortmore	426	Islands	Drumcliff	Ennis
Gortnaboul	270	Corcomroe	Kilshanny	Ennistimon
Gortnaclohy	193	Corcomroe	Kilmanaheen	Ennistimon
Gortnacorragh	84	Tulla Lower	Clonlea	Tulla
Gortnacurra	149	Clonderalaw	Killadysert	Killadysert
Gortnaglearagh	8	Tulla Lower	Clonlea	Tulla
Gortnaglogh	186	Tulla Lower	Kilseily	Limerick
Gortnaglogh	112	Inchiquin	Rath	Corrofin
Gortnagonnella	156	Tulla Lower	Kilseily	Limerick
Gortnahaha	445	Clonderalaw	Killadysert	Killadysert
Gortnamearacaun	802	Bunratty Upper	Inchicronan	Tulla
Gortnamuck	135	Islands	Clondagad	Killadysert
Gortnamuinga	216	Tulla Upper	Feakle	Tulla
Gortnanool	75	Bunratty Lower	Kilfintinan	Limerick
Gortnaskagh	163	Moyarta	Kilrush	Kilrush
Gortnavreaghaun	180	Clonderalaw	Killadysert	Killadysert
Gortygeeheen	1,717	Islands	Clondagad	Killadysert
Gower North	320	Moyarta	Kilmacduane	Kilrush
Gower South	525	Moyarta	Kilmacduane	Kilrush
Gowerhass	933	Moyarta	Kilrush	Kilrush
Gowlaun	180	Burren	Kilmoon	Ballyvaghan
Gragan East	698	Burren	Rathborney	Ballyvaghan
Gragan West	958	Burren	Rathborney	Ballyvaghan
Graigue Island	3	Bunratty Lower	Kilfintinan	Limerick
Granaghan	128	Bunratty Lower	Tomfinlough	Ennis
Granaghan Beg	157	Bunratty Lower	Tomfinlough	Ennis
Granaghan More	339	Bunratty Lower	Tomfinlough	Ennis
Green Island	14	Bunratty Lower	Kilfintinan	Limerick
Green Island	5	Tulla Upper	Feakle	Scarriff
Green Island	1	Burren	Drumcreehy	Ballyvaghan
Gregmoher	16	Inchiquin	Ruan	Corrofin
Greygrove	667	Clonderalaw	Kilmihil	Kilrush
Heathmount	237	Bunratty Lower	Kilfintinan	Limerick
Hog Island (or Inishbig)	43	Moyarta	Kilrush	Kilrush
Horse Island	34	Islands	Clondagad	Killadysert
Hurdleston	559	Tulla Lower	Kilseily	Limerick
Ieverstown	60	Bunratty Lower	Kilfinaghta	Limerick
Illaun	413	Ibrickan	Kilfarboy	Ennistimon
Illaunaclaggin	1	Moyarta	Kilrush	Kilrush
Illaunacoran	2	Burren	Abbey	Ballyvaghan
Illaunalea	1	Moyarta	Kilrush	Kilrush
Illaunanadderha	3	Tulla Lower	Killaloe	Scarriff
Illaunaroan	1	Bunratty Lower	St. Patrick's	Limerick
Illaunatoo (or Sorrel-Island)	276	Clonderalaw	Kilmihil	Ennis
Illaunbaun	436	Corcomroe	Clooney	Ennistimon
Illaunbaun	418	Ibrickan	Kilfarboy	Ennistimon
Illaunbeg (or O'Donnell's Island)	8	Clonderalaw	Killadysert	Killadysert
Illauncraggagh	2	Burren	Drumcreehy	Ballyvaghan
Illaunnoncaraun	9	Moyarta	Moyarta	Kilrush
Illaunyregan	351	Tulla Lower	Kiltenanlea	Limerick
Inch More	191	Islands	Drumcliff	Ennis
Inchalughoge	387	Tulla Upper	Kilnoe	Scarriff
Inchbeg	203	Islands	Drumcliff	Ennis
Inchicronan Island	181	Bunratty Upper	Inchicronan	Ennis
Inchiquin	290	Inchiquin	Killinaboy	Corrofin
Ing	222	Bunratty Lower	Kilmaleery	Ennis
Ing East	101	Bunratty Lower	Kilnasoolagh	Ennis
Ing West	241	Bunratty Lower	Kilnasoolagh	Ennis
Inishaellaun	37	Islands	Clondagad	Killadysert
Inishbig (or Hog Island)	43	Moyarta	Kilrush	Kilrush
Inishcorker	207	Clonderalaw	Killadysert	Killadysert
Inishdadroum	4	Clonderalaw	Killadysert	Killadysert
Inishdea	600	Clonderalaw	Kilchreest	Killadysert
Inishloe	131	Clonderalaw	Killadysert	Killadysert
Inishlosky	21	Tulla Lower	O'Briensbridge	Limerick
Inishmacnaghtan	284	Bunratty Lower	Kilconry	Ennis
Inishmacowney	225	Clonderalaw	Killadysert	Killadysert
Inishmore	105	Bunratty Upper	Templemaley	Corrofin
Inishmore (or Deerisland)	443	Clonderalaw	Kilchreest	Killadysert
Inishmurry	9	Clonderalaw	Killadysert	Killadysert
Inishoul (or O'Gardy's Island)	1	Clonderalaw	Killadysert	Killadysert
Inishtubbrid	95	Clonderalaw	Killadysert	Killadysert
Iragh	317	Tulla Lower	Killuran	Tulla
Iskancullin	220	Burren	Carran	Ballyvaghan
Island	76	Corcomroe	Killilagh	Ennistimon
Island	52	Bunratty Lower	Kilfintinan	Limerick
Islandavanna	29	Islands	Clareabbey	Ennis
Islandcosgry	333	Tulla Lower	Ogonnelloe	Scarriff
Islandgar	84	Inchiquin	Kilnamona	Ennis
Islandmacnevin	58	Bunratty Lower	Kilmaleery	Ennis
Islandmagrath	537	Islands	Clareabbey	Ennis
Islandmore	146	Inchiquin	Killinaboy	Corrofin
Islandmore	33	Tulla Upper	Feakle	Tulla
Keelderry	368	Tulla Lower	Killuran	Tulla
Keelhilla	1,035	Burren	Carran	Ballyvaghan
Keelkyle	226	Corcomroe	Clooney	Ennistimon
Keelty	51	Islands	Drumcliff	Ennis
Keevagh	218	Bunratty Upper	Quin	Ennis
Kells	745	Inchiquin	Kilkeedy	Corrofin
Kihaska	359	Inchiquin	Rath	Corrofin
**Kilbaha**	Town	Moyarta	Kilballyowen	Kilrush
Kilbaha North	756	Moyarta	Kilballyowen	Kilrush
Kilbaha South	1,014	Moyarta	Kilballyowen	Kilrush
Kilballyowen	1,012	Moyarta	Kilballyowen	Kilrush
Kilbane	794	Tulla Lower	Killokennedy	Limerick
Kilbarron	428	Tulla Upper	Feakle	Scarriff
Kilboggoon	157	Tulla Upper	Tulla	Tulla
Kilbreckan	576	Bunratty Upper	Doora	Ennis
Kilcarragh	209	Corcomroe	Kilfenora	Ennistimon
Kilcarroll	712	Moyarta	Kilrush	Kilrush
Kilcasheen	189	Moyarta	Moyarta	Kilrush
Kilclaran	17	Tulla Upper	Feakle	Scarriff
Kilclehaun	391	Ibrickan	Kilmurry	Kilrush
Kilcloher	678	Moyarta	Kilballyowen	Kilrush
Kilcloher	552	Islands	Kilmaley	Ennis
Kilcolumb	667	Islands	Kilmaley	Ennis
Kilconnell	228	Corcomroe	Kilmacrehy	Ennistimon
Kilcorcoran	406	Ibrickan	Kilfarboy	Ennistimon
Kilcorkan	285	Inchiquin	Kilkeedy	Corrofin
Kilcornan	419	Bunratty Lower	Kilmurry	Tulla
Kilcornan	345	Corcomroe	Kilmanaheen	Ennistimon
Kilcorney	248	Burren	Kilcorney	Ballyvaghan
Kilcorney Glebe	28	Burren	Kilcorney	Ballyvaghan
Kilcredaun	275	Moyarta	Moyarta	Kilrush
Kilcredaun	275	Tulla Lower	O'Briensbridge	Limerick
Kilcurrish	262	Inchiquin	Dysert	Ennis
Kildavin	265	Tulla Upper	Feakle	Scarriff
Kildeema	274	Moyarta	Kilfearagh	Kilrush
Kildeema North	202	Ibrickan	Kilfarboy	Ennistimon
Kildeema South	468	Ibrickan	Kilfarboy	Ennistimon
Kildoorus	331	Tulla Lower	Kiltenanlea	Limerick
Kildrum	91	Bunratty Upper	Quin	Tulla
Kilduff Lower	119	Tulla Upper	Tulla	Tulla
Kilduff Middle	111	Tulla Upper	Tulla	Tulla
Kilduff Upper	206	Tulla Upper	Tulla	Tulla
Kilfarboy	430	Ibrickan	Kilfarboy	Ennistimon
Kilfearagh	1,290	Moyarta	Kilfearagh	Kilrush
Kilfeilim	94	Bunratty Upper	Doora	Ennis
Kilfenora	629	Corcomroe	Kilfenora	Ennistimon
**Kilfenora**	Town	Corcomroe	Kilfenora	Ennistimon
Kilglassy	92	Islands	Killone	Ennis
Kilgobban	156	Bunratty Upper	Clooney	Tulla
Kilgory	324	Tulla Upper	Kilnoe	Tulla
**Kilkee**	Town	Moyarta	Kilfearagh	Kilrush
Kilkee East	211	Inchiquin	Ruan	Corrofin
Kilkee Lower	100	Moyarta	Kilfearagh	Kilrush
Kilkee Upper	129	Moyarta	Kilfearagh	Kilrush
Kilkee West	138	Inchiquin	Ruan	Corrofin
Kilkerin	734	Clonderalaw	Killofin	Killadysert
Kilkieran	41	Bunratty Lower	Kilnasoolagh	Ennis
Kilkishen	129	Bunratty Lower	Kilmurry	Tulla
**Kilkishen**	Town	Tulla Lower	Clonlea	Tulla
Kilkishen Demesne	325	Bunratty Lower	Kilmurry	Tulla
Kilkishen Demesne	58	Tulla Lower	Clonlea	Tulla
Killaderry (Massy)	166	Tulla Lower	Kilseily	Limerick
Killaderry (O'Brien)	203	Tulla Lower	Kilseily	Limerick
Killadysert	298	Clonderalaw	Killadysert	Killadysert
**Killadysert**	Town	Clonderalaw	Killadysert	Killadysert
**Killaloe**	Town	Tulla Lower	Killaloe	Scarriff
Killanena	1,656	Tulla Upper	Feakle	Tulla
Killanena	232	Tulla Lower	Clonlea	Tulla
Killard	627	Ibrickan	Killard	Kilrush
Killaspuglonane	421	Corcomroe	Killaspuglonane	Ennistimon
Killavoy	158	Tulla Lower	Killuran	Tulla
Killawinna	175	Bunratty Upper	Doora	Ennis
Killeagy (Goonan)	467	Tulla Lower	Killokennedy	Limerick
Killeagy (Ryan)	487	Tulla Lower	Killokennedy	Limerick
Killeagy (Stritch)	112	Tulla Lower	Killokennedy	Limerick
Killeany	102	Burren	Killeany	Ballyvaghan
Killeen	414	Inchiquin	Rath	Corrofin
Killeen	221	Inchiquin	Ruan	Corrofin
Killeen	181	Tulla Lower	Clonlea	Tulla
Killeen	157	Inchiquin	Killinaboy	Corrofin
Killeenagh	367	Moyarta	Moyarta	Kilrush
Killeenan	154	Inchiquin	Dysert	Ennis
Killeenmacoog North	32	Inchiquin	Kilkeedy	Corrofin
Killeenmacoog South	503	Inchiquin	Kilkeedy	Corrofin
Killeinagh	44	Corcomroe	Clooney	Ennistimon
Killerk East	219	Islands	Killone	Ennis
Killerk West	230	Islands	Killone	Ennis
Killernan	668	Ibrickan	Kilmurry	Ennistimon
Killestry	247	Tulla Lower	Killaloe	Scarriff
Killian	240	Bunratty Upper	Templemaley	Ennis
Killilagh	95	Corcomroe	Killilagh	Ennistimon
Killinaboy	159	Inchiquin	Killinaboy	Corrofin
Killinny	357	Moyarta	Moyarta	Kilrush
Killofin	316	Clonderalaw	Killofin	Killadysert
Killoghil	444	Burren	Drumcreehy	Ballyvaghan
Killokennedy	1,373	Tulla Lower	Killokennedy	Limerick
Killourney	329	Inchiquin	Kilkeedy	Corrofin
Killow	296	Islands	Clareabbey	Ennis
Killulla	380	Bunratty Lower	Clonloghan	Ennis
Killuran	234	Tulla Lower	Killuran	Tulla
Killuran Beg	231	Tulla Lower	Killuran	Tulla
Killuran More	387	Tulla Lower	Killuran	Tulla
Kilmacduane East	560	Moyarta	Kilmacduane	Kilrush
Kilmacduane West	765	Moyarta	Kilmacduane	Kilrush
Kilmaleery	111	Bunratty Lower	Kilmaleery	Ennis
Kilmaley	290	Islands	Kilmaley	Ennis
Kilmihil	830	Clonderalaw	Kilmihil	Kilrush
**Kilmihil**	Town	Clonderalaw	Kilmihil	Kilrush
Kilmoculla	213	Tulla Lower	Kilseily	Limerick
Kilmoon East	319	Burren	Kilmoon	Ennistimon
Kilmoon West	372	Burren	Kilmoon	Ennistimon
Kilmoraun	325	Islands	Killone	Ennis
Kilmore	874	Tulla Lower	Killokennedy	Limerick
Kilmore	495	Tulla Upper	Tulla	Tulla
Kilmore	349	Clonderalaw	Kilmurry	Kilrush
Kilmore	129	Islands	Killone	Ennis
Kilmore North	499	Corcomroe	Kiltoraght	Corrofin
Kilmore South	198	Corcomroe	Kiltoraght	Corrofin
Kilmurry	200	Bunratty Lower	Kilmurry	Tulla
**Kilmurry**	Town	Bunratty Lower	Kilmurry	Tulla
Kilmurry East	137	Clonderalaw	Kilmurry	Killadysert
Kilmurry West	148	Clonderalaw	Kilmurry	Killadysert
Kilnacally	125	Islands	Drumcliff	Ennis
Kilnacrandy	160	Bunratty Lower	Tomfinlough	Ennis
Kilnacrandy	131	Bunratty Upper	Quin	Tulla
Kilnacreagh	255	Bunratty Lower	Kilfinaghta	Limerick
Kilnagallagh	168	Moyarta	Kilfearagh	Kilrush
Kilnamona	25	Inchiquin	Kilnamona	Ennis
Kilnasoolagh	86	Bunratty Lower	Kilnasoolagh	Ennis
Kilnoe	417	Tulla Upper	Kilnoe	Scarriff
Kilquane	90	Islands	Drumcliff	Ennis
Kilquane	48	Bunratty Lower	St. Patrick's	Limerick
Kilroughil	280	Tulla Lower	O'Briensbridge	Limerick
Kilrush	269	Moyarta	Kilrush	Kilrush
**Kilrush**	Town	Moyarta	Kilrush	Kilrush
Kilseily	226	Tulla Lower	Kilseily	Limerick
Kiltaan	375	Burren	Noughaval	Ballyvaghan
Kiltacky Beg	338	Inchiquin	Kilkeedy	Corrofin
Kiltacky More	310	Inchiquin	Kilkeedy	Corrofin
Kiltanon	464	Tulla Upper	Tulla	Tulla
Kiltennan North	42	Burren	Noughaval	Ballyvaghan
Kiltennan South	49	Burren	Noughaval	Ballyvaghan
Kiltrellig	570	Moyarta	Kilballyowen	Kilrush
**Kiltrellig**	Town	Moyarta	Kilballyowen	Kilrush
Kiltumper	808	Clonderalaw	Kilmihil	Kilrush
Kilvoydan	164	Inchiquin	Killinaboy	Corrofin
Kilvoydan North	232	Bunratty Upper	Inchicronan	Ennis
Kilvoydan South	252	Bunratty Upper	Inchicronan	Ennis
Kilweelran	652	Burren	Oughtmama	Ballyvaghan
Kineilty	403	Corcomroe	Kilmacrehy	Ennistimon
Kinlea	240	Clonderalaw	Kilmurry	Killadysert
Kinturk	959	Islands	Kilmaley	Ennis
Knappoge	44	Clonderalaw	Kilchreest	Killadysert
Knock	367	Islands	Drumcliff	Ennis
Knock	319	Clonderalaw	Kilmurry	Kilrush
**Knock**	Town	Clonderalaw	Kilmurry	Kilrush
Knockacarn	439	Corcomroe	Clooney	Ennistimon
Knockacarn	93	Corcomroe	Killilagh	Ennistimon
Knockacaurhin	217	Inchiquin	Kilnamona	Ennis
Knockaclara	134	Bunratty Upper	Templemaley	Ennis
Knockacullea North	199	Corcomroe	Clooney	Ennistimon
Knockacullea South	296	Corcomroe	Clooney	Ennistimon
Knockadangan	201	Islands	Kilmaley	Ennis
Knockaderreen	554	Clonderalaw	Kilmurry	Kilrush
Knockaderreen	312	Tulla Lower	O'Briensbridge	Limerick
Knockaderry	159	Bunratty Upper	Templemaley	Ennis
Knockadoon	134	Tulla Upper	Tulla	Tulla
Knockaguilla	288	Corcomroe	Killilagh	Ennistimon
Knockalassa	935	Inchiquin	Inagh	Ennistimon
Knockalehid	90	Islands	Clondagad	Killadysert
Knockalisheen	445	Bunratty Lower	St. Munchin's	Limerick
Knockalisheen	84	Tulla Upper	Feakle	Scarriff
Knockaloaghan	319	Bunratty Upper	Inchicronan	Tulla
Knockalough	877	Clonderalaw	Kilmihil	Kilrush
Knockaluskraun	144	Bunratty Upper	Kilraghtis	Ennis
Knockanalban	939	Ibrickan	Kilmurry	Ennistimon
Knockanean	336	Bunratty Upper	Doora	Ennis
Knockaneden	137	Corcomroe	Kiltoraght	Corrofin
Knockanena	206	Tulla Upper	Feakle	Tulla
Knockanimana	199	Islands	Clareabbey	Ennis
Knockaninaun	271	Islands	Drumcliff	Ennis
Knockanira	31	Islands	Killone	Ennis
Knockanoura	582	Bunratty Upper	Clooney	Tulla
Knockanoura	55	Bunratty Upper	Templemaley	Ennis
Knockans Lower	423	Burren	Carran	Ballyvaghan
Knockans Upper	361	Burren	Carran	Ballyvaghan
Knockanulty	176	Corcomroe	Clooney	Ennistimon
Knockaphreaghaun	337	Bunratty Upper	Clooney	Tulla
Knockaskeheen	457	Burren	Kilmoon	Ennistimon
Knockaskibbole	67	Bunratty Upper	Doora	Ennis
Knockatemple	139	Inchiquin	Kilnamona	Ennis
Knockatermon	104	Inchiquin	Kilkeedy	Corrofin
Knockatinty	208	Tulla Lower	Clonlea	Tulla
Knockatloe	134	Tulla Lower	Clonlea	Tulla
Knockatooreen	405	Tulla Lower	Clonlea	Tulla
Knockatullaghaun	381	Corcomroe	Clooney	Ennistimon
Knockatunna	852	Islands	Kilmaley	Ennis
Knockatunna	218	Tulla Upper	Feakle	Tulla
Knockaun	142	Bunratty Lower	Drumline	Ennis
Knockaun	121	Bunratty Lower	Clonloghan	Ennis
Knockaunanerrigal	27	Inchiquin	Dysert	Ennis
Knockaunroe	472	Inchiquin	Killinaboy	Corrofin
Knockaunroe	169	Inchiquin	Dysert	Ennis
Knockaunsmountain	689	Burren	Killonaghan	Ballyvaghan
Knockaunvickteera	108	Burren	Kilmoon	Ballyvaghan
Knockavoarheen	252	Burren	Noughaval	Ballyvaghan
Knockballynameath	107	Bunratty Lower	St. Patrick's	Limerick
Knockbeha	886	Tulla Upper	Feakle	Scarriff
Knockbeha Mountain	466	Tulla Upper	Feakle	Scarriff
Knockbrack	246	Ibrickan	Kilfarboy	Ennistimon
Knockbrack	83	Corcomroe	Kilmanaheen	Ennistimon
Knockbrack Lower	167	Tulla Lower	Kiltenanlea	Limerick
Knockbrack Upper	157	Tulla Lower	Kiltenanlea	Limerick
Knockdonagh	265	Tulla Lower	O'Briensbridge	Limerick
Knockdoocunna	182	Tulla Upper	Tulla	Tulla
Knockdrumleague	87	Tulla Upper	Tulla	Tulla
Knockdrummagh North	99	Corcomroe	Clooney	Ennistimon
Knockdrummagh South	101	Corcomroe	Clooney	Ennistimon
Knockerry East	232	Moyarta	Kilrush	Kilrush
Knockerry West	463	Moyarta	Kilrush	Kilrush
Knockhogan	209	Bunratty Upper	Doora	Ennis
Knockloskeraun	780	Ibrickan	Kilmurry	Ennistimon
Knockmael East	390	Bunratty Upper	Inchicronan	Gort
Knockmael West	208	Bunratty Upper	Inchicronan	Ennis
Knockmore	880	Clonderalaw	Kilmihil	Kilrush
Knockmore	145	Inchiquin	Dysert	Ennis
Knockmore	132	Islands	Kilmaley	Ennis
Knockmoy	44	Islands	Kilmaley	Ennis
Knockmurragha	20	Bunratty Lower	Kilnasoolagh	Ennis
Knocknagarhoon	405	Moyarta	Moyarta	Kilrush
Knocknageeha	695	Tulla Upper	Feakle	Tulla
Knocknagoug	132	Bunratty Upper	Quin	Tulla
Knocknagraigue East	100	Corcomroe	Clooney	Corrofin
Knocknagraigue West	305	Corcomroe	Clooney	Ennistimon
Knocknagroagh	441	Burren	Drumcreehy	Ballyvaghan
Knocknahannee	205	Tulla Upper	Feakle	Tulla
Knocknahila Beg	319	Ibrickan	Kilmurry	Kilrush
Knocknahila More North	334	Ibrickan	Kilmurry	Kilrush
Knocknahila More South	440	Ibrickan	Kilmurry	Kilrush
Knocknahooan	212	Moyarta	Kilrush	Kilrush
Knocknahooan	179	Clonderalaw	Killimer	Kilrush
Knocknalappa	345	Bunratty Lower	Kilmurry	Tulla
Knocknamucky	217	Bunratty Upper	Inchicronan	Tulla
Knocknaraha	167	Corcomroe	Killaspuglonane	Ennistimon
Knocknaranhy	203	Corcomroe	Killilagh	Ennistimon
Knocknareeha	111	Inchiquin	Rath	Corrofin
Knocknaskeagh	354	Corcomroe	Kilshanny	Ennistimon
Knocknaskeagh	222	Bunratty Lower	Killeely	Limerick
Knockneppy	172	Corcomroe	Clooney	Ennistimon
Knockogonnell	407	Inchiquin	Inagh	Ennistimon
Knockpatrick	218	Corcomroe	Kilmanaheen	Ennistimon
Knockphutleen	300	Clonderalaw	Killofin	Killadysert
Knockreagh	407	Inchiquin	Dysert	Ennis
Knockreddan	344	Bunratty Upper	Inchicronan	Tulla
Knockroe	612	Corcomroe	Kiltoraght	Corrofin
Knockroe	201	Inchiquin	Kilkeedy	Corrofin
Knockroe	107	Bunratty Lower	Killeely	Limerick
Knockroe	88	Moyarta	Kilfearagh	Kilrush
Knockroe	88	Bunratty Lower	Kilfintinan	Limerick
Knockroe	75	Corcomroe	Clooney	Ennistimon
Knocksaggart	331	Clonderalaw	Kilchreest	Killadysert
Knocksaggart	149	Bunratty Lower	Kilnasoolagh	Ennis
Knockshanvo	487	Tulla Lower	Kilseily	Limerick
Knockycallanan	519	Burren	Oughtmama	Ballyvaghan
Knockyclovaun	250	Tulla Lower	Killaloe	Scarriff
Knopoge	495	Bunratty Upper	Quin	Tulla
Kyle	307	Tulla Lower	Kilseily	Limerick
Kylea	536	Inchiquin	Inagh	Ennistimon
Kyleatunna	639	Islands	Kilmaley	Ennis
Kylecreen	653	Inchiquin	Kilkeedy	Corrofin
Kyleglass	88	Tulla Lower	Killokennedy	Limerick
**Labasheeda**	Town	Clonderalaw	Killofin	Killadysert
Lack	464	Clonderalaw	Kilchreest	Killadysert
Lack East	756	Clonderalaw	Kilmihil	Kilrush
Lack West	1,375	Clonderalaw	Kilmihil	Kilrush
Lackabranner	479	Tulla Lower	Killaloe	Scarriff
Lackamore	474	Ibrickan	Kilfarboy	Ennistimon
Lackanashinnagh	445	Clonderalaw	Killadysert	Killadysert
Lackareagh	224	Inchiquin	Killinaboy	Corrofin
Lackareagh Beg	488	Tulla Lower	O'Briensbridge	Limerick
Lackareagh More	397	Tulla Lower	O'Briensbridge	Limerick
Lacken	697	Clonderalaw	Kilmihil	Kilrush
Lackenbaun	155	Tulla Lower	Killaloe	Scarriff
Lackennaskagh	165	Islands	Killone	Ennis
Laghcloon	273	Corcomroe	Kilmacrehy	Ennistimon
Laghile	89	Bunratty Lower	Kilfintinan	Limerick
Laghtagoona	271	Inchiquin	Killinaboy	Corrofin
Laghtmurreda	310	Corcomroe	Killilagh	Ennistimon
Laghvally	115	Corcomroe	Kilmacrehy	Ennistimon
Lahardan	282	Bunratty Upper	Inchicronan	Ennis
Lahardaun	553	Tulla Upper	Tulla	Tulla
Lakyle	185	Tulla Lower	Clonlea	Tulla
Lakyle	108	Bunratty Lower	St. Patrick's	Limerick
Lakyle	23	Bunratty Lower	Killeely	Limerick
Lakyle North	297	Clonderalaw	Killofin	Killadysert
Lakyle South	212	Clonderalaw	Killofin	Killadysert
Langough	163	Bunratty Lower	Tomfinlough	Ennis
Lanna	455	Islands	Clondagad	Killadysert
Lannaght	650	Tulla Upper	Feakle	Tulla
Laraghakea	133	Corcomroe	Kilfenora	Ennistimon
Lassana	167	Bunratty Upper	Clooney	Tulla
Latoon North	158	Bunratty Lower	Kilnasoolagh	Ennis
Latoon South	301	Bunratty Lower	Kilnasoolagh	Ennis
Lavally	127	Clonderalaw	Kilchreest	Killadysert
Lavally North	372	Islands	Clondagad	Killadysert
Lavally South	192	Islands	Clondagad	Killadysert
Lavarreen	534	Corcomroe	Clooney	Ennistimon
Leadmore East	341	Moyarta	Kilrush	Kilrush
Leadmore West	296	Moyarta	Kilrush	Kilrush
Leagard North	224	Ibrickan	Kilfarboy	Ennistimon
Leagard South	489	Ibrickan	Kilfarboy	Ennistimon
Leaghort	181	Tulla Upper	Feakle	Scarriff
Leaghort Beg	103	Tulla Upper	Feakle	Tulla
Leaghort More	209	Tulla Upper	Feakle	Tulla
Leaheen	167	Moyarta	Kilfearagh	Kilrush
Leamaneh North	377	Inchiquin	Killinaboy	Corrofin
Leamaneh South	187	Inchiquin	Killinaboy	Corrofin
Leamaneigh Beg	95	Bunratty Lower	Clonloghan	Ennis
Leamaneigh More	215	Bunratty Lower	Clonloghan	Ennis
Leamnaleaha	586	Clonderalaw	Kilchreest	Killadysert
Leana	674	Inchiquin	Killinaboy	Corrofin
Lecarrow Beg	116	Islands	Kilmaley	Ennis
Lecarrow Lower	555	Tulla Upper	Feakle	Scarriff
Lecarrow More	117	Islands	Kilmaley	Ennis
Lecarrow North	237	Tulla Upper	Tulla	Tulla
Lecarrow South	106	Tulla Upper	Tulla	Tulla
Lecarrow Upper	244	Tulla Upper	Feakle	Scarriff
Leckaun	658	Inchiquin	Kilnamona	Ennis
Leeds	371	Ibrickan	Kilfarboy	Ennistimon
Lehaknock	188	Islands	Kilmaley	Ennis
Lehinch	275	Corcomroe	Kilmanaheen	Ennistimon
**Lehinch**	Town	Corcomroe	Kilmacrehy	Ennistimon
**Lehinch**	Town	Corcomroe	Kilmanaheen	Ennistimon
Leitra	507	Inchiquin	Kilkeedy	Corrofin
Leitrim	982	Clonderalaw	Kilmihil	Kilrush
Leitrim	403	Tulla Lower	Killokennedy	Limerick
Letteragh	2,072	Islands	Kilmaley	Ennis
Letterkelly	856	Inchiquin	Inagh	Ennistimon
Lickeen East	651	Corcomroe	Kilfenora	Ennistimon
Lickeen West	205	Corcomroe	Kilfenora	Ennistimon
Licknaun	321	Bunratty Upper	Templemaley	Ennis
Lifford	451	Islands	Drumcliff	Ennis
Lisbarreen	466	Tulla Upper	Kilnoe	Scarriff
Lisbiggeen	102	Islands	Kilmaley	Ennis
Liscannor	171	Corcomroe	Kilmacrehy	Ennistimon
**Liscannor**	Town	Corcomroe	Kilmacrehy	Ennistimon
Liscasey	2,064	Islands	Clondagad	Killadysert
Lisconor	102	Bunratty Lower	Clonloghan	Ennis
Liscoonera	153	Burren	Killonaghan	Ballyvaghan
Liscormick	275	Clonderalaw	Killadysert	Killadysert
Liscullaun	510	Tulla Upper	Tulla	Tulla
Liscullaun	133	Inchiquin	Rath	Corrofin
Lisdeen	774	Moyarta	Kilfearagh	Kilrush
Lisdoonvarna	635	Burren	Kilmoon	Ballyvaghan
Lisdoony East	59	Corcomroe	Kilfenora	Ennistimon
Lisdoony West	257	Corcomroe	Kilfenora	Ennistimon
Lisduff	314	Tulla Upper	Tulla	Tulla
Lisduff	264	Bunratty Lower	Kilnasoolagh	Ennis
Lisduff	257	Inchiquin	Killinaboy	Corrofin
Lisduff	180	Tulla Lower	Kiltenanlea	Limerick
Lisduff	103	Inchiquin	Ruan	Corrofin
Lisgoogan	223	Burren	Rathborney	Ballyvaghan
Lisgurreen	439	Ibrickan	Killard	Kilrush
Lisheen	959	Islands	Clondagad	Killadysert
**Lisheen**	Town	Moyarta	Moyarta	Kilrush
Lisheencrony	1,242	Moyarta	Moyarta	Kilrush
Lisheeneagh	55	Burren	Kilmoon	Ballyvaghan
Lisheenfurroor	855	Moyarta	Moyarta	Kilrush
Lisheenvicknaheeha	75	Inchiquin	Ruan	Corrofin
Lisheenydeen	222	Clonderalaw	Kilmurry	Kilrush
Lisket	262	Corcomroe	Kilfenora	Ennistimon
Lislarheenbeg	214	Burren	Killeany	Ballyvaghan
Lislarheenmore	504	Burren	Rathborney	Ballyvaghan
Lislea	133	Bunratty Lower	Clonloghan	Ennis
Lislorkan North	310	Corcomroe	Kilmacrehy	Ennistimon
Lislorkan South	194	Corcomroe	Kilmacrehy	Ennistimon
Lisluinaghan	847	Moyarta	Kilfearagh	Kilrush
Lismacleane	109	Bunratty Lower	Clonloghan	Ennis
Lismacsheedy	385	Burren	Rathborney	Ballyvaghan
Lismacteige	402	Burren	Rathborney	Ballyvaghan
Lismeehan (or Maryfort)	297	Tulla Upper	Tulla	Tulla
Lismoher	153	Burren	Noughaval	Ballyvaghan
Lismorahaun	223	Burren	Kilmoon	Ballyvaghan
Lismorris	339	Islands	Clondagad	Killadysert
Lismuinga East	54	Inchiquin	Ruan	Corrofin
Lismuinga West	109	Inchiquin	Ruan	Corrofin
Lismulbreeda	415	Islands	Killone	Ennis
Lismuse	398	Ibrickan	Killard	Kilrush
Lisnafaha	230	Clonderalaw	Killadysert	Killadysert
Lisnanard	127	Burren	Drumcreehy	Ballyvaghan
Lisnanroum	103	Burren	Kilcorney	Ballyvaghan
Lispuckaun	319	Islands	Kilmaley	Ennis
Lisroe	538	Islands	Kilmaley	Ennis
Lisroe	205	Corcomroe	Clooney	Ennistimon
Liss	402	Tulla Upper	Feakle	Tulla
Lissalougha	77	Moyarta	Kilballyowen	Kilrush
Lissan East	214	Islands	Clareabbey	Ennis
Lissan West	385	Islands	Clareabbey	Ennis
Lissanair	435	Clonderalaw	Kilmihil	Kilrush
Lissatunna	221	Corcomroe	Kilmanaheen	Ennistimon
Lissofin	294	Tulla Upper	Tulla	Tulla
Lissyline	43	Inchiquin	Ruan	Corrofin
Lissylisheen	457	Burren	Rathborney	Ballyvaghan
Lissyneillan	193	Ibrickan	Kilmurry	Kilrush
Lissyvurriheen	426	Clonderalaw	Killadysert	Killadysert
Little Quay Island	1	Bunratty Lower	Bunratty	Ennis
Little Venture	1	Bunratty Lower	Kilmaleery	Ennis
Loughaun North	501	Tulla Upper	Tulla	Tulla
Loughaun South	37	Tulla Upper	Tulla	Tulla
Loughaunnaweelaun	295	Inchiquin	Ruan	Corrofin
Loughborough	320	Tulla Lower	Killuran	Tulla
Loughburke	238	Islands	Kilmaley	Ennis
Loughnagowan	302	Inchiquin	Rath	Ennistimon
Loughrask	282	Burren	Drumcreehy	Ballyvaghan
Loughvella	209	Islands	Drumcliff	Ennis
Luogh North	611	Corcomroe	Killilagh	Ennistimon
Luogh South	457	Corcomroe	Killilagh	Ennistimon
Lurraga	115	Corcomroe	Killilagh	Ennistimon
Lyan	613	Inchiquin	Kilkeedy	Corrofin
Madara	59	Bunratty Upper	Quin	Tulla
Maghera	1,713	Tulla Upper	Feakle	Tulla
Maghera	1,460	Bunratty Upper	Clooney	Tulla
Maghera	668	Inchiquin	Inagh	Ennistimon
Maghera	326	Corcomroe	Kilmanaheen	Ennistimon
Maghera	146	Inchiquin	Rath	Corrofin
Magherabaun	958	Tulla Upper	Feakle	Scarriff
Magherabaun	642	Inchiquin	Inagh	Ennistimon
Magheranraheen (or Rockforest)	511	Inchiquin	Kilkeedy	Corrofin
Magherareagh	342	Tulla Lower	O'Briensbridge	Limerick
Magheraweelen	105	Burren	Kilcorney	Ballyvaghan
Magowna	357	Islands	Kilmaley	Ennis
Magowna	89	Inchiquin	Kilnamona	Ennis
Magowna East	15	Inchiquin	Dysert	Ennis
Magowna West	84	Inchiquin	Dysert	Ennis
Mahonburgh	242	Islands	Drumcliff	Ennis
Manusmore	922	Islands	Clareabbey	Ennis
Martry	414	Inchiquin	Rath	Ennistimon
Maryfort (or Lismeehan)	297	Tulla Upper	Tulla	Tulla
Maryville	143	Corcomroe	Kilfenora	Ennistimon
Mattle Island	1	Ibrickan	Kilmurry	Kilrush
Mausnarylaan	280	Bunratty Lower	Tomfinlough	Ennis
Meelick	789	Bunratty Lower	Killeely	Limerick
Meelick	52	Inchiquin	Inagh	Ennistimon
Meenross	538	Tulla Upper	Moynoe	Scarriff
Meggagh East	31	Burren	Carran	Ballyvaghan
Meggagh West	119	Burren	Carran	Ballyvaghan
Menagh	249	Tulla Lower	Kilseily	Limerick
Milltown	465	Tulla Upper	Tulla	Tulla
**Milltown Malbay**	Town	Ibrickan	Kilfarboy	Ennistimon
Moananagh	299	Corcomroe	Clooney	Ennistimon
Moanmore Lower	441	Moyarta	Kilrush	Kilrush
Moanmore North	405	Moyarta	Kilrush	Kilrush
Moanmore South	1,175	Moyarta	Kilrush	Kilrush
Moanmore Upper	368	Moyarta	Kilrush	Kilrush
Moanogeenagh	337	Tulla Lower	Killuran	Tulla
Moanreel North	355	Inchiquin	Rath	Ennistimon
Moanreel South	508	Inchiquin	Rath	Ennistimon
Moarhaun	58	Inchiquin	Kilnamona	Ennis
Moe	42	Tulla Upper	Feakle	Scarriff
Mogouhy	86	Burren	Carran	Ballyvaghan
Mogullaan	82	Bunratty Lower	Drumline	Ennis
Moheramoylan	189	Burren	Carran	Ballyvaghan
Moheraroon	138	Burren	Carran	Ballyvaghan
Moherbullog	30	Inchiquin	Rath	Corrofin
Mollaneen	260	Inchiquin	Dysert	Ennis
Molosky	583	Ibrickan	Kilmurry	Kilrush
Molougha	508	Moyarta	Kilrush	Kilrush
Monanaleen	287	Inchiquin	Killinaboy	Corrofin
Monanoe	232	Bunratty Upper	Doora	Ennis
Monaskeha	218	Tulla Lower	Kiltenanlea	Limerick
Moneen	446	Burren	Abbey	Ballyvaghan
Moneen	145	Moyarta	Kilballyowen	Kilrush
Moneennagliggin North (or Boston)	129	Bunratty Lower	Killeely	Limerick
Moneennagliggin South	89	Bunratty Lower	Killeely	Limerick
Monreagh	398	Inchiquin	Kilkeedy	Corrofin
Mooghaun North	233	Bunratty Lower	Tomfinlough	Ennis
Mooghaun South	426	Bunratty Lower	Tomfinlough	Ennis
Mooghna	698	Corcomroe	Clooney	Ennistimon
Mortyclogh	285	Burren	Abbey	Ballyvaghan
Mount	138	Clonderalaw	Kilchreest	Killadysert
Mountallon	160	Tulla Lower	Clonlea	Tulla
Mountcashel	92	Bunratty Lower	Kilfinaghta	Tulla
Mountcatherine	322	Tulla Lower	Kiltenanlea	Limerick
Mountgordon	141	Bunratty Lower	St. Munchin's	Limerick
Mountievers	348	Bunratty Lower	Kilfinaghta	Limerick
Mountievers	27	Bunratty Lower	Kilfintinan	Limerick
Mountrice	317	Tulla Lower	Kilseily	Limerick
Mountrivers	943	Ibrickan	Killard	Kilrush
Mountshannon East	513	Clonderalaw	Killofin	Killadysert
Mountshannon West	417	Clonderalaw	Killofin	Killadysert
Moveen East	1,066	Moyarta	Moyarta	Kilrush
Moveen West	1,119	Moyarta	Moyarta	Kilrush
Moy	713	Clonderalaw	Kilfiddane	Killadysert
Moy Beg	304	Ibrickan	Kilfarboy	Ennistimon
Moy More	208	Ibrickan	Kilfarboy	Ennistimon
Moyadda Beg	242	Moyarta	Kilrush	Kilrush
Moyadda More	413	Moyarta	Kilrush	Kilrush
Moyarta East	241	Moyarta	Moyarta	Kilrush
Moyarta West	340	Moyarta	Moyarta	Kilrush
Moyasta	904	Moyarta	Kilfearagh	Kilrush
Moyfadda	425	Clonderalaw	Kilfiddane	Killadysert
Moygalla	261	Bunratty Lower	Kilfinaghta	Tulla
Moyglass Beg	200	Ibrickan	Kilmurry	Kilrush
Moyglass More	263	Ibrickan	Kilmurry	Kilrush
Moygowna	233	Burren	Carran	Ballyvaghan
Moyhill	601	Inchiquin	Rath	Corrofin
Moyhill	430	Bunratty Lower	Kilfintinan	Limerick
Moyhullin	166	Inchiquin	Dysert	Ennis
Moymore	306	Tulla Upper	Tulla	Tulla
Moymore	275	Inchiquin	Ruan	Corrofin
Moymore North	510	Corcomroe	Killaspuglonane	Ennistimon
Moymore South	24	Corcomroe	Killaspuglonane	Ennistimon
Moyne	302	Moyarta	Kilrush	Kilrush
Moynoe	417	Tulla Upper	Moynoe	Scarriff
Moyree Commons	522	Inchiquin	Ruan	Corrofin
Moyreisk	575	Bunratty Upper	Doora	Ennis
Moyreisk	77	Bunratty Upper	Clooney	Ennis
Moys	261	Tulla Lower	Killaloe	Scarriff
Muckanagh (Butler)	111	Bunratty Lower	Tomfinlough	Ennis
Muckanagh (Studdert)	140	Bunratty Lower	Tomfinlough	Ennis
Muckanagh (Vandeleur)	325	Bunratty Lower	Tomfinlough	Ennis
Muckinish	422	Bunratty Upper	Clooney	Ennis
Muckinish	204	Inchiquin	Inagh	Ennistimon
Muckinish East	365	Burren	Drumcreehy	Ballyvaghan
Muckinish West	747	Burren	Drumcreehy	Ballyvaghan
Muingacarreen	309	Tulla Upper	Feakle	Scarriff
Muingboy	430	Tulla Lower	Killokennedy	Limerick
**Mullagh**	Town	Ibrickan	Kilmurry	Kilrush
Munnia	388	Burren	Abbey	Ballyvaghan
Murrooghkilly	1,049	Burren	Gleninagh	Ballyvaghan
Murrooghtoohy North	619	Burren	Gleninagh	Ballyvaghan
Murrooghtoohy South	517	Burren	Gleninagh	Ballyvaghan
Mutton Island	158	Ibrickan	Kilmurry	Kilrush
Mweelagarraun	35	Inchiquin	Kilnamona	Ennis
Newgrove (or Ballyslattery)	754	Tulla Upper	Tulla	Tulla
Newhall	561	Islands	Killone	Ennis
Newmarket	181	Bunratty Lower	Tomfinlough	Ennis
**Newmarket On Fergus**	Town	Bunratty Lower	Tomfinlough	Ennis
Newpark	201	Bunratty Lower	Feenagh	Ennis
Newpark	106	Bunratty Upper	Templemaley	Ennis
Newquay	291	Burren	Oughtmama	Ballyvaghan
Newtown	805	Burren	Drumcreehy	Ballyvaghan
Newtown	264	Tulla Lower	Kiltenanlea	Limerick
Newtown	138	Tulla Lower	Killuran	Tulla
Newtown East	183	Moyarta	Moyarta	Kilrush
Newtown West	151	Moyarta	Moyarta	Kilrush
Nooaff East	130	Islands	Drumcliff	Ennis
Nooaff West	187	Islands	Drumcliff	Ennis
Nooan	452	Inchiquin	Killinaboy	Corrofin
Nooan	400	Inchiquin	Ruan	Corrofin
Noughaval	500	Burren	Noughaval	Ballyvaghan
Noughaval	200	Bunratty Upper	Doora	Ennis
Nutfield	219	Bunratty Upper	Templemaley	Corrofin
Oakfield	260	Tulla Lower	Kiltenanlea	Limerick
Oatfield	871	Tulla Lower	Clonlea	Limerick
O'Briensbridge	740	Tulla Lower	O'Briensbridge	Limerick
**O'Briensbridge**	Town	Tulla Lower	O'Briensbridge	Limerick
Obrienscastle	213	Bunratty Upper	Inchicronan	Tulla
**O'Callaghansmills**	Town	Tulla Lower	Killuran	Tulla
O'Donnell's Island (or Illaunbeg)	8	Clonderalaw	Killadysert	Killadysert
O'Grady's Island (or Inishoul)	1	Clonderalaw	Killadysert	Killadysert
Ooankeagh	115	Inchiquin	Ruan	Corrofin
O'Shea's Acres	137	Tulla Lower	Kilseily	Limerick
Oughtdarra	289	Corcomroe	Killilagh	Ennistimon
Oughterard	537	Moyarta	Kilballyowen	Kilrush
Oughtmama	821	Burren	Oughtmama	Ballyvaghan
Parkalough	88	Bunratty Upper	Inchicronan	Tulla
Parkmore	57	Tulla Upper	Feakle	Scarriff
Parknabinnia	356	Inchiquin	Killinaboy	Corrofin
Parkroe	67	Bunratty Lower	St. Patrick's	Limerick
Parnamoney	180	Moyarta	Kilrush	Kilrush
Parteen	132	Bunratty Lower	St. Patrick's	Limerick
Pass	69	Bunratty Lower	Killeely	Limerick
Pollagh	115	Bunratty Lower	Kilfinaghta	Limerick
Pollaghanumera	224	Tulla Upper	Feakle	Tulla
Pollagoona Mountain	2,825	Tulla Upper	Moynoe	Scarriff
Pollatrumpa	179	Tulla Upper	Feakle	Scarriff
Porsoon	65	Corcomroe	Kilshanny	Ennistimon
Portdrine	570	Bunratty Lower	Kilfintinan	Limerick
Portlecka	228	Inchiquin	Ruan	Corrofin
Poulacapple	327	Burren	Rathborney	Ballyvaghan
Poulacarran	319	Burren	Carran	Ballyvaghan
Poulaforia	112	Tulla Upper	Tulla	Tulla
Poulagower	481	Tulla Upper	Tomgraney	Scarriff
Poulanine	208	Burren	Kilcorney	Ballyvaghan
Poulaphuca	179	Burren	Carran	Ballyvaghan
Poulaphuca	148	Burren	Oughtmama	Ballyvaghan
Poulaphuca	64	Clonderalaw	Kilchreest	Killadysert
Poulataggle	470	Inchiquin	Kilkeedy	Corrofin
Poulawack	226	Burren	Carran	Ballyvaghan
Poulawillan	444	Ibrickan	Kilfarboy	Ennistimon
Poulbaun	392	Burren	Kilcorney	Ballyvaghan
Poulbaun	124	Inchiquin	Rath	Corrofin
Poulcaragharush	181	Burren	Carran	Ballyvaghan
Pouleenacoona	191	Inchiquin	Kilkeedy	Corrofin
Poulgorm	343	Burren	Kilcorney	Ballyvaghan
Pouliskaboy	61	Corcomroe	Killilagh	Ennistimon
Poulmacrih	47	Inchiquin	Kilkeedy	Corrofin
Poulnabrone	166	Burren	Kilcorney	Ballyvaghan
Poulnabrucky	272	Burren	Rathborney	Ballyvaghan
Poulnadarree	315	Clonderalaw	Killimer	Kilrush
Poulnagun	477	Corcomroe	Killilagh	Ennistimon
Poulnalour	618	Inchiquin	Killinaboy	Corrofin
Poulnaskagh	120	Burren	Kilcorney	Ballyvaghan
Poulroc	467	Inchiquin	Kilkeedy	Corrofin
Priest's Rock	1	Bunratty Lower	Kilconry	Ennis
Prospect	133	Clonderalaw	Kilmurry	Killadysert
Pullagh	653	Burren	Carran	Ballyvaghan
Punchbowl	134	Bunratty Lower	Killeely	Limerick
Quakerstown	324	Inchiquin	Kilkeedy	Corrofin
Quay Island	22	Bunratty Lower	Bunratty	Ennis
Querrin	1,532	Moyarta	Moyarta	Kilrush
Quilty	291	Moyarta	Kilballyowen	Kilrush
Quilty East	363	Ibrickan	Kilmurry	Kilrush
Quilty West	303	Ibrickan	Kilmurry	Kilrush
Quin	40	Bunratty Upper	Quin	Tulla
**Quin**	Town	Bunratty Upper	Quin	Tulla
Quingardens	170	Bunratty Upper	Quin	Tulla
Quinspool North	165	Bunratty Lower	St. Patrick's	Limerick
Quinspool South	125	Bunratty Lower	St. Patrick's	Limerick
Quinville North	48	Bunratty Upper	Quin	Tulla
Quinville South	23	Bunratty Upper	Quin	Tulla
Rabbit Island	4	Tulla Upper	Moynoe	Scarriff
Racorcraun	41	Bunratty Upper	Kilraghtis	Ennis
Rafline	274	Inchiquin	Rath	Corrofin
Rahaniska	245	Moyarta	Moyarta	Kilrush
Raheen	406	Tulla Upper	Tomgraney	Scarriff
Rahena Beg	292	Tulla Lower	Ogonnelloe	Scarriff
Rahena More	222	Tulla Lower	Ogonnelloe	Scarriff
Rahona East	416	Moyarta	Moyarta	Kilrush
Rahona West	391	Moyarta	Moyarta	Kilrush
Ranaghan	419	Inchiquin	Ruan	Corrofin
Rannagh	253	Corcomroe	Killaspuglonane	Ennistimon
Rannagh	228	Tulla Upper	Tulla	Tulla
Rannagh	176	Corcomroe	Kilmacrehy	Ennistimon
Rannagh East	416	Burren	Carran	Ballyvaghan
Rannagh West	896	Burren	Carran	Ballyvaghan
Rapepark	51	Moyarta	Kilrush	Kilrush
Rath	221	Inchiquin	Rath	Corrofin
Rath Beg	148	Bunratty Lower	Feenagh	Tulla
Rath More	352	Bunratty Lower	Feenagh	Tulla
Rathbaun	110	Burren	Kilmoon	Ballyvaghan
Rathcahaun	205	Inchiquin	Ruan	Corrofin
Rathclooney	737	Bunratty Upper	Clooney	Tulla
Rathcraggaun	188	Islands	Drumcliff	Ennis
Rathcrony	357	Islands	Kilmaley	Ennis
Rathfolan	323	Bunratty Lower	Kilnasoolagh	Ennis
Rathkerry	205	Islands	Drumcliff	Ennis
Rathlaheen North	43	Bunratty Lower	Tomfinlough	Ennis
Rathlaheen South	1,425	Bunratty Lower	Tomfinlough	Ennis
Rathluby	123	Bunratty Upper	Quin	Tulla
Rathmeehan	55	Islands	Killone	Ennis
Rathvergin	203	Inchiquin	Ruan	Corrofin
Reaghfa	74	Islands	Killone	Ennis
Reanabrone	116	Bunratty Lower	St. Patrick's	Limerick
Reanagishagh	650	Islands	Kilmaley	Ennis
Reanahumana	476	Tulla Upper	Feakle	Tulla
Reaskaun	101	Bunratty Upper	Templemaley	Ennis
Reaskcamoge	490	Bunratty Lower	Kilfinaghta	Limerick
Red Island	11	Tulla Upper	Inishcaltra	Scarriff
Rehy East	669	Moyarta	Kilballyowen	Kilrush
Rehy West	653	Moyarta	Kilballyowen	Kilrush
Renalicka	118	Corcomroe	Clooney	Ennistimon
Rine	325	Burren	Oughtmama	Ballyvaghan
Rine	88	Bunratty Upper	Quin	Tulla
Rine	69	Tulla Upper	Tulla	Tulla
Rineanna North	595	Bunratty Lower	Kilconry	Ennis
Rineanna South	460	Bunratty Lower	Kilconry	Ennis
Rinecaha	515	Inchiquin	Kilkeedy	Corrofin
Rineenacolla	1	Bunratty Lower	Kilconry	Ennis
Rinelea	279	Inchiquin	Ruan	Corrofin
Rinemackaderrig	260	Moyarta	Moyarta	Kilrush
Rineroe	78	Ibrickan	Kilmurry	Kilrush
Rineroe	62	Tulla Lower	Kiltenanlea	Limerick
Rinerrinagh	97	Inchiquin	Dysert	Ennis
Rinnamona	429	Inchiquin	Killinaboy	Corrofin
Rinneen	462	Inchiquin	Ruan	Corrofin
Rinneen	392	Corcomroe	Kilmanaheen	Ennistimon
Rinneen	49	Bunratty Upper	Quin	Tulla
Rinroe	193	Inchiquin	Kilkeedy	Corrofin
**Roadford**	Town	Corcomroe	Killilagh	Ennistimon
Rockforest (or Magheranraheen)	511	Inchiquin	Kilkeedy	Corrofin
Rockvale	457	Inchiquin	Kilkeedy	Corrofin
Roo East	246	Tulla Lower	O'Briensbridge	Limerick
Roo West	214	Tulla Lower	O'Briensbridge	Limerick
Rooska	200	Burren	Kilmoon	Ballyvaghan
Rosmadda East	180	Bunratty Lower	St. Patrick's	Limerick
Rosmadda West	139	Bunratty Lower	St. Patrick's	Limerick
Rosneillan	65	Tulla Lower	Killuran	Tulla
Rosroe	275	Bunratty Lower	Kilmurry	Tulla
Ross	489	Moyarta	Kilballyowen	Kilrush
Ross	402	Tulla Lower	O'Briensbridge	Limerick
Ross	137	Inchiquin	Dysert	Corrofin
Ross	100	Tulla Upper	Feakle	Scarriff
**Ross**	Town	Moyarta	Kilballyowen	Kilrush
Rossalia	468	Burren	Abbey	Ballyvaghan
Rossanure	147	Tulla Upper	Feakle	Scarriff
Rosscliff	188	Clonderalaw	Kilchreest	Killadysert
Rosslara	318	Tulla Upper	Tulla	Tulla
Rosslevan	266	Bunratty Upper	Kilraghtis	Ennis
Rossmanagher	789	Bunratty Lower	Feenagh	Ennis
Roughan	128	Corcomroe	Kilfenora	Ennistimon
Roughaun	127	Inchiquin	Killinaboy	Corrofin
Roxton	452	Inchiquin	Rath	Corrofin
Ruan Commons	15	Inchiquin	Ruan	Corrofin
Ruanard	176	Tulla Lower	Kiltenanlea	Limerick
Rushaun	260	Inchiquin	Kilnamona	Ennis
Rusheen	210	Clonderalaw	Killadysert	Killadysert
Rusheen	142	Burren	Noughaval	Ballyvaghan
Russa	79	Corcomroe	Clooney	Ennistimon
Rylane	849	Bunratty Upper	Clooney	Tulla
Saint Thomas Island	21	Bunratty Lower	St. Patrick's	Limerick
Saints Island	13	Bunratty Lower	Bunratty	Ennis
Sallybank (Merritt) (or Drumsillagh)	523	Tulla Lower	Kilseily	Limerick
Sallybank (Parker) (or Drumsillagh)	588	Tulla Lower	Kilseily	Limerick
Scalp	285	Tulla Upper	Feakle	Tulla
Scalpnagown	2,234	Bunratty Upper	Inchicronan	Tulla
Scanlan's Island	70	Burren	Oughtmama	Ballyvaghan
**Scarriff**	Town	Tulla Upper	Tomgraney	Scarriff
Scattery Island	179	Moyarta	Kilrush	Kilrush
Scool	290	Inchiquin	Rath	Corrofin
Seafield	165	Ibrickan	Kilmurry	Kilrush
Seersha	60	Bunratty Lower	Feenagh	Ennis
Shallee	260	Inchiquin	Kilnamona	Ennis
Shanavogh East	868	Ibrickan	Kilmurry	Ennistimon
Shanavogh West	432	Ibrickan	Kilmurry	Ennistimon
Shanbally	164	Corcomroe	Kilmanaheen	Ennistimon
Shanballysallagh	348	Inchiquin	Kilkeedy	Corrofin
Shandangan	320	Inchiquin	Killinaboy	Corrofin
Shandangan	43	Bunratty Upper	Quin	Tulla
Shandangan East	203	Bunratty Lower	Kilmurry	Tulla
Shandangan West	208	Bunratty Lower	Kilmurry	Tulla
Shandrum	437	Ibrickan	Kilmurry	Kilrush
Shanganagh	174	Moyarta	Moyarta	Kilrush
Shannacool	449	Clonderalaw	Killadysert	Killadysert
Shannacool	95	Islands	Killone	Ennis
Shannakea Beg	296	Clonderalaw	Kilfiddane	Killadysert
Shannakea More	822	Clonderalaw	Kilfiddane	Killadysert
Shannaknock	243	Tulla Lower	Killokennedy	Limerick
Shannakyle	275	Bunratty Lower	St. Patrick's	Limerick
Shantraud	202	Tulla Lower	Killaloe	Scarriff
Shantulla	72	Islands	Drumcliff	Ennis
Shanvogh	254	Islands	Drumcliff	Ennis
Sheeaun	1,302	Clonderalaw	Kilmihil	Kilrush
Sheeaun	708	Islands	Kilmaley	Ennis
Sheeaun	631	Tulla Upper	Moynoe	Scarriff
Sheshia	320	Burren	Abbey	Ballyvaghan
Sheshodonnell East	41	Burren	Carran	Ballyvaghan
Sheshodonnell West	106	Burren	Carran	Ballyvaghan
Sheshymore	715	Burren	Noughaval	Corrofin
Shessiv	258	Clonderalaw	Kilfiddane	Killadysert
Shessiv	174	Inchiquin	Rath	Corrofin
Shingaunagh North	105	Corcomroe	Kilmacrehy	Ennistimon
Shingaunagh South	82	Corcomroe	Kilmacrehy	Ennistimon
Shore Island	28	Clonderalaw	Kilfiddane	Killadysert
Sileshaun East	283	Inchiquin	Inagh	Ennistimon
Sileshaun West	375	Inchiquin	Inagh	Ennistimon
Silvergrove	533	Tulla Lower	Killuran	Tulla
Silverhill	411	Ibrickan	Kilfarboy	Ennistimon
Sixmilebridge	294	Bunratty Lower	Kilfinaghta	Ennis
**Sixmilebridge**	Town	Bunratty Lower	Kilfinaghta	Ennis
Skaghvickincrow	387	Inchiquin	Inagh	Ennistimon
Skehanagh	543	Islands	Clareabbey	Ennis
Sladoo	243	Burren	Carran	Ballyvaghan
Slaghbooly	482	Islands	Kilmaley	Ennis
Slievealoughaun	232	Islands	Kilmaley	Ennis
Slieveanore	3,168	Tulla Upper	Feakle	Scarriff
Slievecarran	657	Burren	Oughtmama	Ballyvaghan
Slievedooley	522	Clonderalaw	Killofin	Killadysert
Slievenabillog	35	Burren	Killeany	Ballyvaghan
Slievenageeragh	250	Corcomroe	Kilmacrehy	Ennistimon
Slievenaglasha	249	Inchiquin	Killinaboy	Corrofin
Slievenagry	197	Corcomroe	Kilfenora	Ennistimon
Slievenalicka	322	Ibrickan	Kilfarboy	Ennistimon
Smithstown	309	Bunratty Lower	Drumline	Ennis
Smithstown	285	Corcomroe	Kilshanny	Ennistimon
Snaty (Cooper)	344	Tulla Lower	Kilseily	Limerick
Snaty (Massy)	3,224	Tulla Lower	Kilseily	Limerick
Snaty (Wilson)	294	Tulla Lower	Kilseily	Limerick
Snugborough	226	Bunratty Lower	Tomfinlough	Ennis
Sod Island	1	Bunratty Lower	Bunratty	Ennis
Soheen	213	Inchiquin	Kilnamona	Ennis
Sooreeny	187	Bunratty Lower	Kilfinaghta	Tulla
Sorrel Island (or Illaunatoo)	276	Clonderalaw	Kilmihil	Ennis
Spaightspark	42	Tulla Upper	Feakle	Tulla
**Spancelhill**	Town	Bunratty Upper	Clooney	Ennis
Spaug	154	Corcomroe	Clooney	Ennistimon
Springfield	306	Tulla Lower	Kiltenanlea	Limerick
Springfield	63	Bunratty Lower	Feenagh	Ennis
Springmount	347	Tulla Lower	Killokennedy	Limerick
Sragh	1,483	Ibrickan	Killard	Kilrush
Sraheen	230	Bunratty Upper	Clooney	Tulla
Sranagalloon	461	Bunratty Upper	Inchicronan	Ennis
Srawickeen	361	Tulla Lower	Kiltenanlea	Limerick
Sroohill	49	Corcomroe	Kilmanaheen	Ennistimon
Stonehall	330	Bunratty Lower	Kilconry	Ennis
Stonepark	98	Bunratty Lower	Killeely	Limerick
Stonepark	94	Tulla Upper	Feakle	Scarriff
Summerhill	230	Tulla Lower	Kiltenanlea	Limerick
Sunnagh	218	Bunratty Upper	Inchicronan	Tulla
Tarmon	666	Clonderalaw	Killimer	Kilrush
Teeraghbeg	130	Corcomroe	Kilmacrehy	Ennistimon
Teergonean	348	Corcomroe	Killilagh	Ennistimon
Teermaclane	602	Islands	Killone	Ennis
Teermulmoney	53	Inchiquin	Ruan	Corrofin
Teernagloghane	423	Moyarta	Kilmacduane	Kilrush
Teernea	166	Inchiquin	Ruan	Corrofin
Teernea Commons	108	Inchiquin	Ruan	Corrofin
Teeronaun	37	Inchiquin	Dysert	Ennis
Teeronea	664	Tulla Lower	Clonlea	Tulla
Teeroneer	65	Tulla Upper	Tomgraney	Scarriff
Teerovannan	470	Tulla Lower	Killuran	Tulla
Teervarna	88	Clonderalaw	Killimer	Kilrush
Teeskagh	376	Inchiquin	Killinaboy	Corrofin
Templebannagh	280	Inchiquin	Kilkeedy	Corrofin
Termon	908	Burren	Carran	Ballyvaghan
Termon East	201	Moyarta	Kilfearagh	Kilrush
Termon West	765	Moyarta	Kilferagh	Kilrush
Terrleheen	196	Corcomroe	Clooney	Ennistimon
Thomastown	127	Moyarta	Kilrush	Kilrush
Toberaniddaun	383	Islands	Clondagad	Killadysert
Tobernaght	857	Tulla Upper	Moynoe	Scarriff
Tome	176	Tulla Upper	Tulla	Tulla
Tomgraney	421	Tulla Upper	Tomgraney	Scarriff
**Tomgraney**	Town	Tulla Upper	Tomgraney	Scarriff
Tonarussa	259	Burren	Drumcreehy	Ballyvaghan
Tonavoher	531	Clonderalaw	Killimer	Kilrush
Tonlegee	564	Clonderalaw	Kilchreest	Killadysert
Tonlegee	51	Inchiquin	Ruan	Corrofin
Tonlegee	20	Inchiquin	Rath	Corrofin
Toomullin	127	Corcomroe	Killilagh	Ennistimon
Toonagh	710	Bunratty Upper	Clooney	Tulla
Toonagh	232	Inchiquin	Dysert	Ennis
Toonagh Commons	74	Inchiquin	Dysert	Ennis
Toor	397	Ibrickan	Kilfarboy	Ennistimon
Tooreen	458	Ibrickan	Kilfarboy	Ennistimon
Tooreen	244	Corcomroe	Kilshanny	Ennistimon
Tooreen	149	Tulla Lower	Killokennedy	Limerick
Tooreen	138	Bunratty Upper	Kilraghtis	Ennis
Tooreen	112	Tulla Lower	Killuran	Tulla
Tooreen East	131	Inchiquin	Kilnamona	Ennis
Tooreen West	127	Inchiquin	Kilnamona	Ennis
Toormore	448	Corcomroe	Kiltoraght	Corrofin
Toormore	38	Inchiquin	Ruan	Corrofin
Toornahooan	160	Corcomroe	Killilagh	Ennistimon
Treanmanagh	476	Ibrickan	Kilmurry	Kilrush
Treanmanagh	150	Inchiquin	Kilkeedy	Corrofin
Treannahow	275	Bunratty Lower	Kilnasoolagh	Ennis
Tromra East	222	Ibrickan	Kilmurry	Kilrush
Tromra West	139	Ibrickan	Kilmurry	Kilrush
Tromracastle	170	Ibrickan	Kilmurry	Kilrush
Trough	393	Tulla Lower	O'Briensbridge	Limerick
Trummer	3	Clonderalaw	Killadysert	Killadysert
Trusklieve	521	Moyarta	Kilballyowen	Kilrush
Trusklieve	328	Moyarta	Moyarta	Kilrush
Tulla	565	Inchiquin	Kilkeedy	Corrofin
Tulla	297	Tulla Upper	Tulla	Tulla
**Tulla**	Town	Tulla Upper	Tulla	Tulla
Tullabrack	919	Moyarta	Kilrush	Kilrush
Tullabrack East	382	Moyarta	Kilmacduane	Kilrush
Tullabrack West	490	Moyarta	Kilmacduane	Kilrush
Tullagh	138	Islands	Drumcliff	Ennis
Tullagh Lower	142	Corcomroe	Kilfenora	Corrofin
Tullagh Upper	222	Corcomroe	Kilfenora	Corrofin
Tullaghaboy	646	Islands	Kilmaley	Ennis
Tullagower	881	Moyarta	Kilrush	Kilrush
Tullagroe	78	Corcomroe	Clooney	Corrofin
Tullaher	1,675	Ibrickan	Killard	Kilrush
Tullaloughlan	90	Corcomroe	Clooney	Corrofin
Tullamore	102	Corcomroe	Killaspuglonane	Ennistimon
Tullaroe	1,036	Moyarta	Moyarta	Kilrush
Tullassa	481	Islands	Drumcliff	Ennis
Tullig	1,057	Moyarta	Kilballyowen	Kilrush
Tullig	14	Moyarta	Moyarta	Kilrush
Tullycommon	962	Inchiquin	Killinaboy	Corrofin
Tullycreen Lower	733	Clonderalaw	Kilmurry	Kilrush
Tullycreen Upper	821	Clonderalaw	Kilmurry	Kilrush
Tullygarvan East	207	Corcomroe	Kilmanaheen	Ennistimon
Tullygarvan West	308	Corcomroe	Kilmanaheen	Ennistimon
Tullyglass	278	Bunratty Lower	Clonloghan	Ennis
Tullymackan	186	Inchiquin	Ruan	Corrofin
Tullyodea	243	Inchiquin	Ruan	Corrofin
Tullyvarraga	255	Bunratty Lower	Drumline	Ennis
Tullyvarraga	226	Bunratty Lower	Clonloghan	Ennis
Tullyvoghan	343	Bunratty Upper	Kilraghtis	Ennis
Turkenagh	415	Inchiquin	Kilkeedy	Corrofin
Turkenagh Mountain	1,913	Tulla Upper	Moynoe	Scarriff
Turlough	1,276	Burren	Oughtmama	Ballyvaghan
Turloughmore	406	Inchiquin	Kilkeedy	Corrofin
Tyredagh Lower	198	Tulla Upper	Tulla	Tulla
Tyredagh Upper	1,089	Tulla Upper	Tulla	Tulla
Uggoon Lower	92	Tulla Upper	Tulla	Tulla
Uggoon Upper	1,084	Tulla Upper	Tulla	Tulla
Urlan Beg	204	Bunratty Lower	Kilmaleery	Ennis
Urlan More	332	Bunratty Lower	Kilmaleery	Ennis
Violethill	216	Tulla Lower	Kilseily	Limerick
Violethill	71	Tulla Lower	Killuran	Tulla
Woodcockhill	799	Bunratty Lower	Killeely	Limerick
Woodfield	286	Tulla Lower	Kilseily	Limerick
Woodmount	184	Corcomroe	Kilmanaheen	Ennistimon
Woodpark	184	Bunratty Lower	Bunratty	Ennis
Woodpark	102	Tulla Lower	Killokennedy	Limerick

== See also ==
- List of civil parishes of County Clare
