= Oughtmama =

Civil parish in County Clare, Ireland

Oughtmama Ucht Máma
- Civil parish
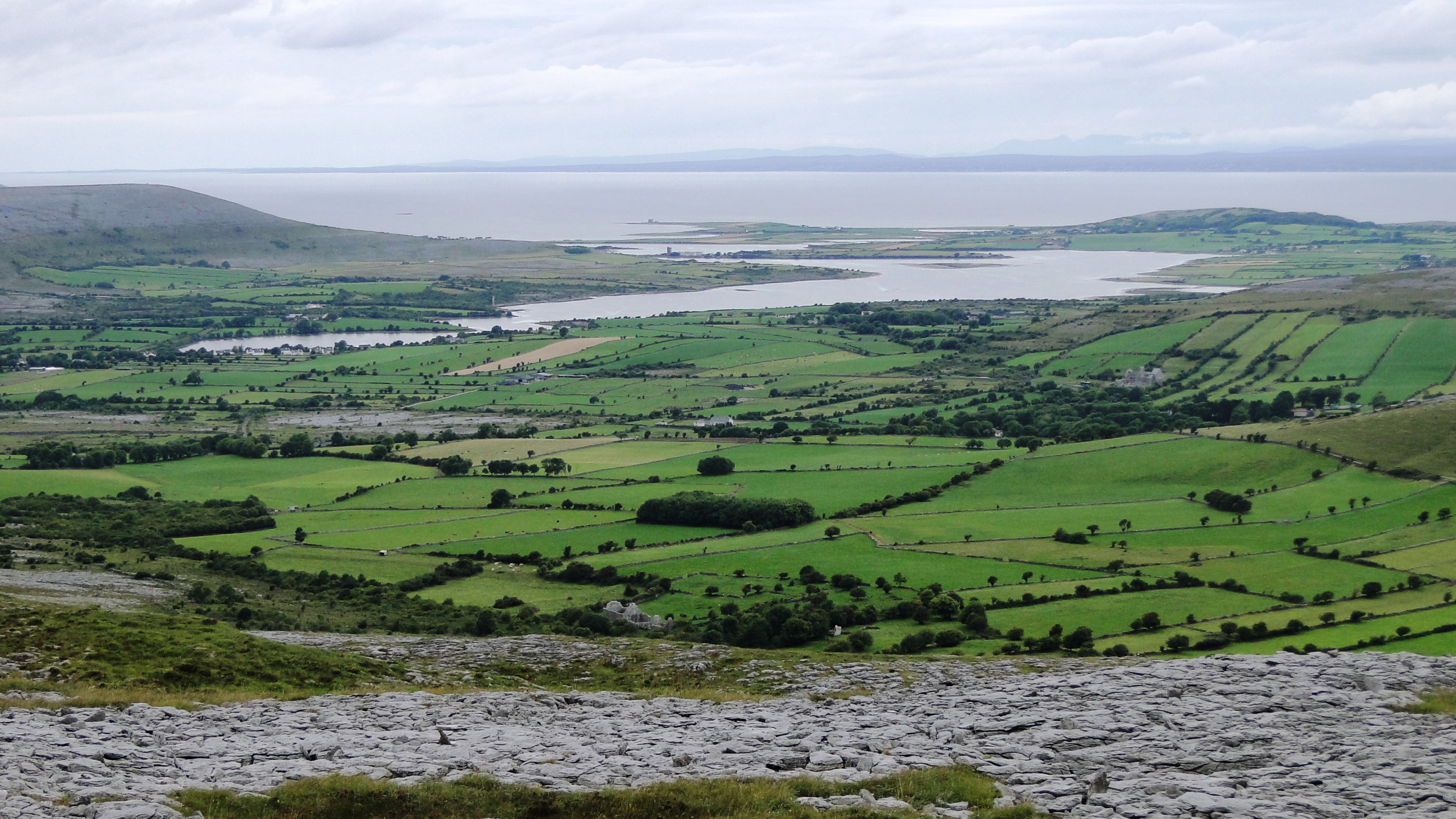
- View northwest from Turlough Hill, with the Oughtmama churches at the foot of the hill, Corcomroe Abbey, two ruined castles and the Finavarra Martello Tower in the back

- Location in Ireland
- Coordinates: 53.151429°N 9.09497°W
- Country: Ireland
- Province: Munster
- County: County Clare
- Time zone: UTC+0 (WET)
  - Summer (DST): UTC-1 (IST (WEST))
- Irish Grid Reference: R330871

Designations

National monument of Ireland
- Official name: Oughtmama
- Reference no.: 12

Oughtmama (Irish: Ucht Máma) is a civil parish in County Clare, Ireland. It lies in the Burren, a region in the northwest of the county. It contains many antiquities, including three early-medieval Christian churches, ruined castles, prehistoric cairns and ring forts and two Martello Towers built in the early 19th century.

== Geography ==
=== Location ===
The parish is in the extreme north of the Barony of Burren, and the county of Clare. The parish is 3.75 by 2.5 miles (6.04 by 4.02 km) and covers 9,843 acres (3,983 ha). The parish holds Lough Murree, a lake of 34 acres (14 ha). It has two headlands that extend into Galway Bay, Aughinish Point and Finavarra Point.

=== Description ===
The land is mostly low-lying, rising to Abbey Hill in the east at 795 feet (242 m) above sea level, although large parts of Abbey Hill are actually located in neighbouring Abbey parish which completely surrounds the Oughtmama parish townland of Behagh. Oughtmama parish also includes part of Turlough Hill and Slieve Carran, the latter rising to over 1,000 feet above sea level.

The parish is not continuous, but consists of several exclaves such as Behagh. It borders on County Galway in several places.

It contains the villages of Aughinish and Finavarra. The population in 1841 was 2,075 in 325 houses.

In the townland of Newquay stands Mount Vernon Lodge, formerly held in fee by the Skerett family, then owned by the parents of Hugh Lane and later the summer home of Lady Augusta Gregory.

== Name ==
The name of the parish, ucht máma, means 'breast of a yoke', i.e. the upper front of a mountain pass. The parish takes its name from the townland of Oughtmama in the east, and describes the situation of that townland on one of the hills that surround the Corcomroe valley.

== Antiquities ==
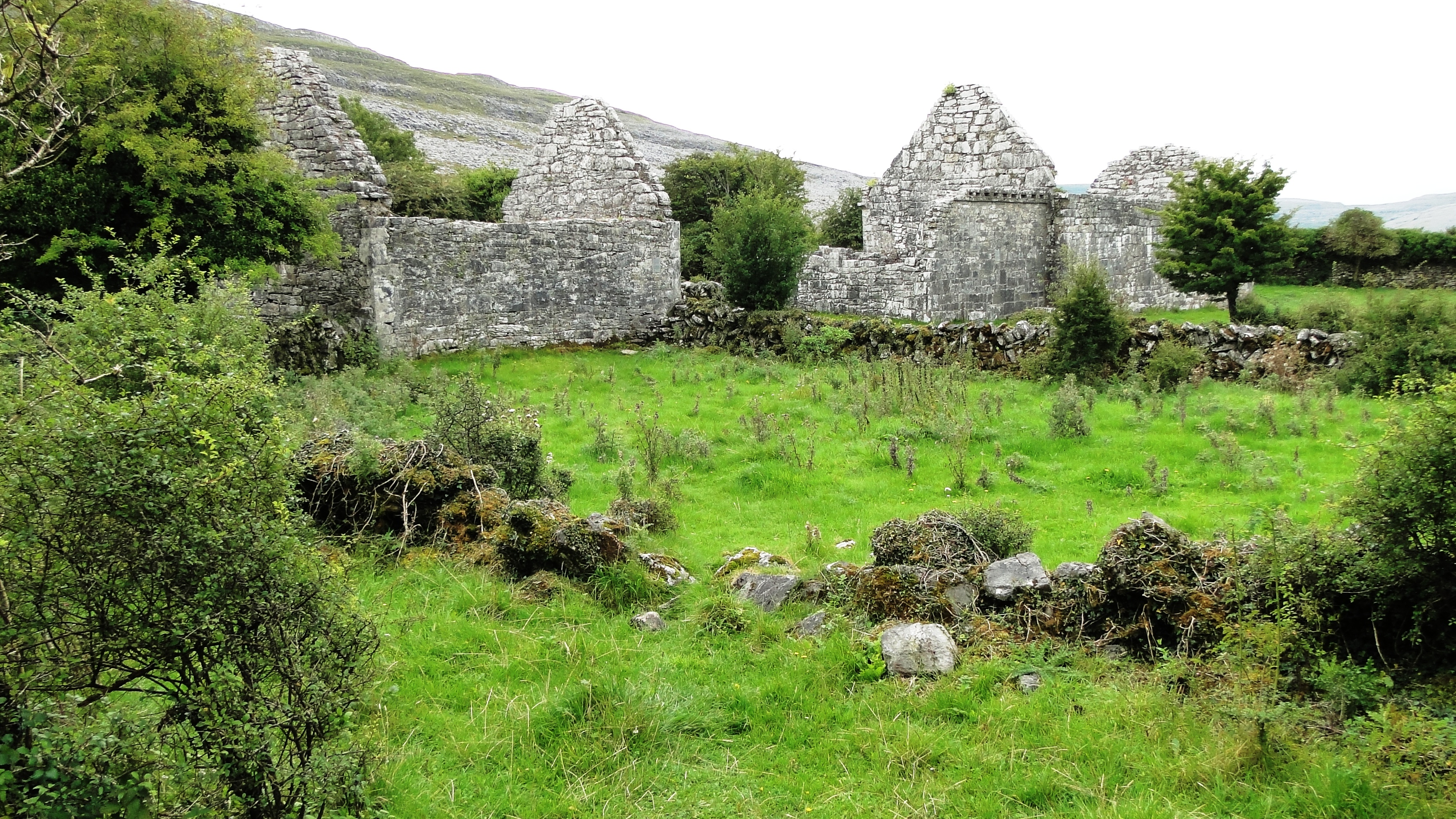
The two larger early medieval Oughtmama churches

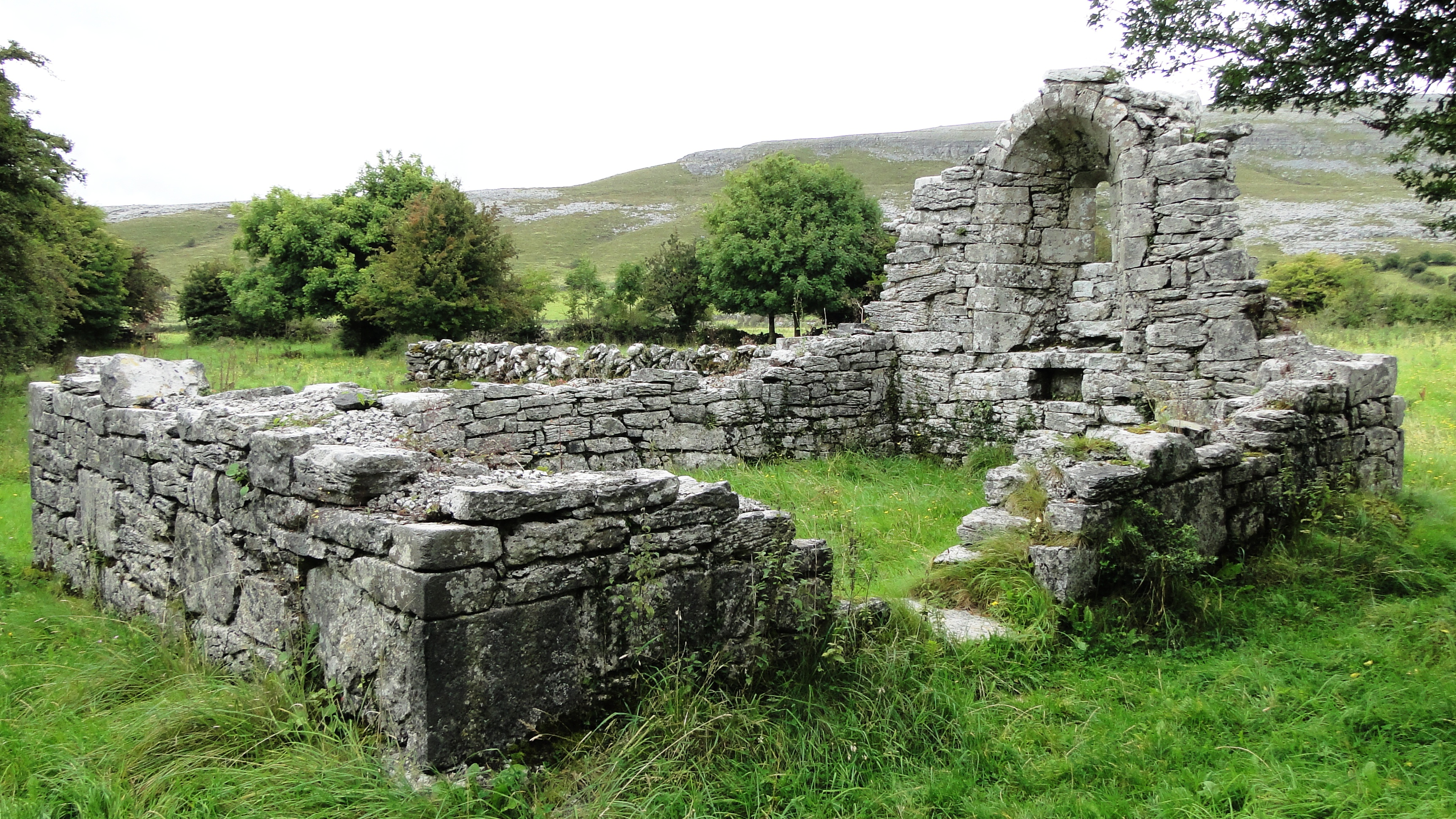
The smallest of the three early medieval Oughtmama churches

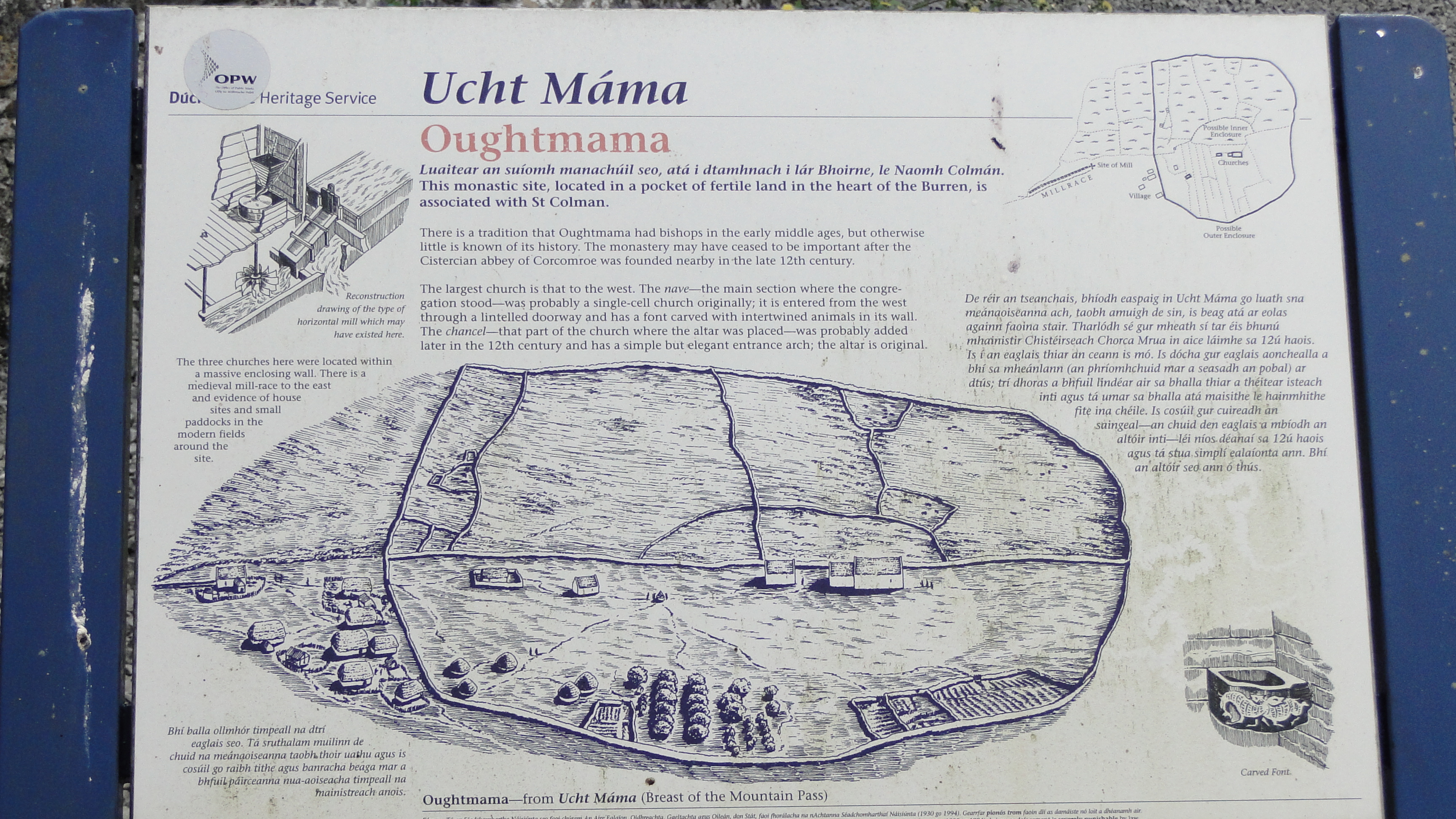
Public info sign at the Oughtmama churches showing the likely appearance of the monastic enclosure

=== Early medieval monastic site ===
There are three churches in the Oughtmama townland, two of them are well preserved, lying together in a straight line. The third is a ruin about 300 feet (91 m) away. The three churches are a National Monument of Ireland.

Although they have not been dated precisely, as there have been no excavations at the site, the churches are thought to be part of an early medieval monastic site and to have been altered several times over a period of 400 or 500 years. The site included a double enclosure of limestone walls, domestic buildings and gardens, a mill race with water mill a leacht (a stone slab likely used as an outdoor altar) and a holy well (see below).

The two larger churches are located within the inner enclosure, whilst the third lies between inner and outer wall. The western (and largest) is considered the oldest. It was likely built around 1100 as a one-room oratory and enlarged in the 13th century when the other two churches were built. The western church features high quality stonemasonry of the type known as Cyclopean with large, well-cut stones.

The central church is also a one-roomed building, featuring a combination of older (possibly removed from the western church) and more recent (i.e. 12th- to 13th-century) features like the doorway. Like the middle church, the eastern one is built on a stone plinth. It is in a much more ruined state than the other two and it is also not aligned with the other two buildings. Its position outside the inner enclosure has led to the theory that it may have served as a place of worship for women, either nuns or lay members of the congregation.

Based on old records, the churches may be assumed to have been built to honor three saints, each named Colman, including Colman mac Duagh.

The outer enclosure was around 50 to 100 m from the inner wall, both of which are still partially reflected in the shape of current field boundaries. The remains of the domestic buildings lie around 100 m east of the churches. These structures, along with the water mill, terraced garden and a possible midden indicate the presence of a substantial number of people at the settlement's peak.

Around 700 m to the northeast of the churches, half way up the slope, lies a holy well dedicated to St. Colman, Tobar Cholmáin. It reportedly served as a cure for eye sores and is still visited by people for that purpose, as evidenced by votive offerings. The traditional annual day of pilgrimage for this site is 15 November.

=== Others ===
There are various cairns and cahers in the parish, mostly ruined.

Turlough Hill (also known as Knockycallanan hill) features a cairn on the highest point. It is likely prehistoric but has not been excavated, so it is uncertain whether it served burial purposes. To the east of the cairn are numerous hut circles, located on the same bedrock terrace as the cairn. At least 165 remains of round stone huts have been identified. This assembly is almost without parallel in Ireland. At Mullaghfarna, County Sligo, a collection of 153 huts situated on a limestone terrace contained both Neolithic and early Bronze Age artifacts, but these were washed into the pavement so as to provide limited information allowing to date the structures. Both purpose and dating of the Turlough Hill settlement remain enigmatic.

This is also true for another structure, located around 600 m to the northeast and just outside the parish's border. It is a large walled enclosure (225 m diameter), resembling a Bronze Age hill fort. However, this structure does not seem to have been built with fortification in mind. It lacks the typical Bronze Age outer ramparts and the main entrance to the east, following a large fault in the bedrock, shows no defensive structures. It is also much too large to defend effectively. An alternative interpretation is for this to have been an earlier, Neolithic, enclosure. Given its strategic position, overlooking the lands around Kinvara as well as a significant part of the northeastern Burren, it may have been used for occasional gatherings of people from different tribes or groupings, for ceremonial or trade purposes.

The department of archaeology of the National University of Ireland, Galway is currently conducting research on the antiquities of Turlough Hill.

There are records of a Franciscan abbey called Beagh, which must have stood in the townland of that name, but there are no traces of it, and no tradition.

The ruins of Turlough Castle lie on the border of a lough. It is almost level with the ground, as is the castle of Finavarra. Both castles belonged to the O'Loghlen family. The hereditary poets of the O'Loghlens in Finavarra were the O'Daly family. They moved to Galway towards the end of the 15th century. One of their descendants was James Daly, 1st Baron Dunsandle and Clanconal.

There are Martello towers on Aughinish Point and Finavarra Point: Finavarra Tower and Aughinish Tower.

Located in Finavarra Demesne are the ruins of Finavarra House and its gate lodge. It is described as "remains of detached L-plan three-bay two-storey over basement house with dormer attic, built c. 1825." This was the residence of the Skerrett family from the mid-18th to the mid-19th century. In the 1850s, the main part of the estate of the Skerretts was in the parish of Oughtmama and in the nearby parishes of Drumcreehy, including part of the village of Ballyvaughan and Rathborney. They also held land in the parish of Kilfenora. Nearby, an octagonal pillar/monument known as the leacht of Donoughmore O'Daly stands close to the shore.

== Townlands ==
The townlands are Aghawinnaun, Aughinish, Behagh, Boloona, Coolnatullagh, Cragballyconoal, Deelin Beg, Deelin More, Finavarra Demesne, Gortaclare, Gortboyheen, Kilweelran, Knockycallanan, Newquay, Oughtmama, Poulaphuca, Rine, Scanlan's Island, Slievecarran and Turlough.

== Gallery ==
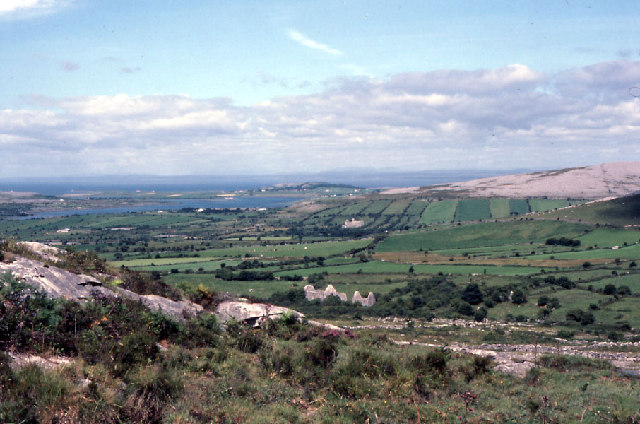
Oughtmama and Bell Harbour

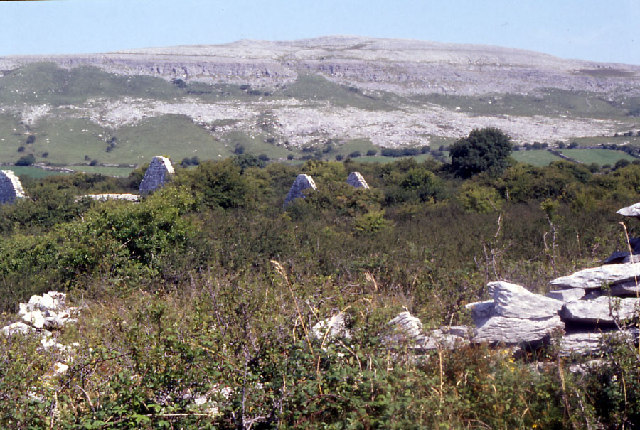
Ruins of two small churches in Oughtmama, now almost concealed by hazel regrowth

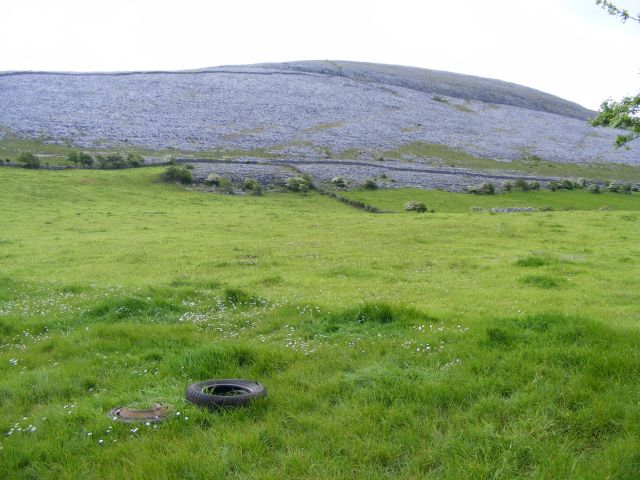
Pasture alongside Corker Pass road, Oughtmama Townland

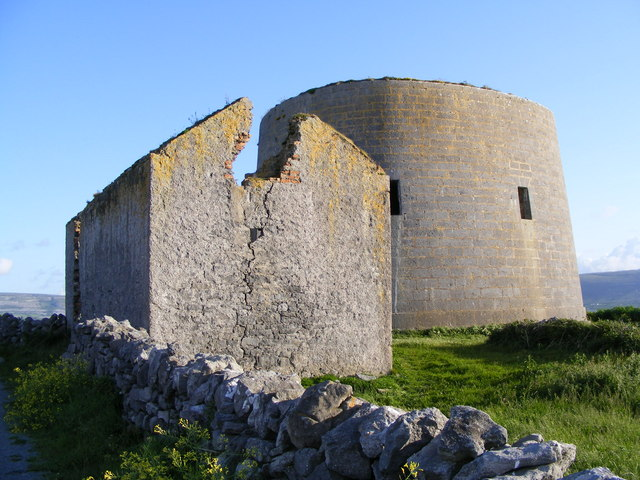
Finavarra Martello Tower

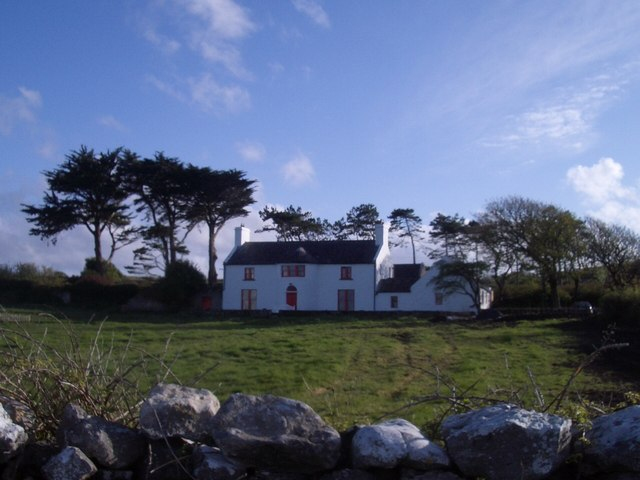
Mount Vernon Lodge

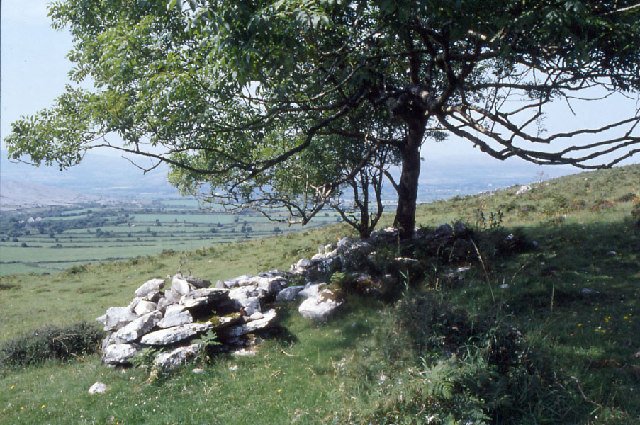
St Colman's Well

== See also ==
- Corcomroe Abbey, located in neighbouring Abbey parish
