= Noughaval (disambiguation) =

Noughaval or Nohoval is a civil parish in County Clare, Ireland.

Noughaval, Nohoval, Nohaval, or Oughaval may also refer to the following places in Ireland:

- Nohaval, County Kerry — civil parish in Trughanacmy
- Nohoval, County Cork — village, civil parish, and townland
- Noughaval, Burren, County Clare — civil parish, electoral district, and townland
- Noughaval (civil parish) — a civil parish spanning counties Longford and Westmeath
- Noughaval, County Westmeath — civil parish, electoral district, and townland in County Westmeath
- Noughaval, Doora, County Clare — townland in County Clare
- Oughaval, County Laois — townland and monastic site
- Oughaval, County Mayo — civil parish in Murrisk
- Oughaval, County Sligo — townland in County Sligo

== See also ==
- List of civil parishes of Ireland
