= Kilmoon =

Civil parish in County Clare, Ireland

Kilmoon Cill Mhúine
- Village and parish
- Location in Ireland
- Coordinates: 53°2′44″N 9°16′7″W
- Country: Ireland
- Province: Munster
- County: County Clare
- Time zone: UTC+0 (WET)
  - Summer (DST): UTC-1 (IST (WEST))

Kilmoon (Irish: Cill Mhúine) is a civil parish of County Clare, Ireland, 7 miles (11 km) north of Ennistymon. The parish contains the town of Lisdoonvarna.

== History ==
The parish was listed as "Kilmugoun" in the Papal taxation of 1302. There is a Romanesque standing stone in the area on the site of a ruined church, St Mogua.

Kilmoon fell under the poor law union of Ennistymon in the barony of Burren, and ecclesiastically belonged to the Diocese of Kilfenora in the Province of Cashel as of 1810.

== Geography ==
The civil parish of Kilmoon is in the northwestern part of the county and is bordered by Rathborney to the northeast, Killeany to the east, Kilfenora to the southeast, Killilagh to the southwest, and Killonaghan to the northwest. It is divided into 22 townlands, including Kilmoon East (319 acres), Kilmoon West (372 acres), Knockaskeheen (457 acres), and Caherbarnagh (183 acres).

== Antiquities ==
The townland of Cahercloggaun contains a cashel (ringfort) and Cahercloggaun Castle. The latter is a ruined 15th-century castle originally owned by the O'Loghlens and built in the southern corner of the ringfort. The property is mentioned several times in 16th-century documents, when inhabitants of the castle were pardoned for committed crimes.

== See also ==
- List of townlands of County Clare
