= Bartley Fahey =

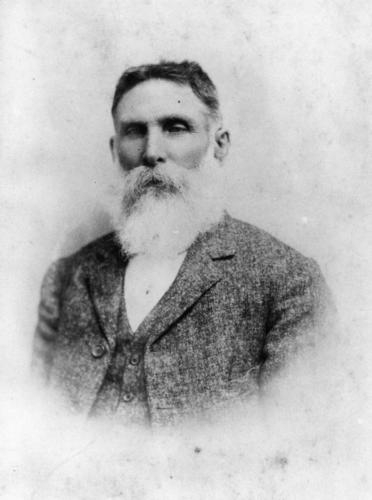

Queensland Legislative Council
- In office 12 July 1906 – 9 August 1920

Personal details
- Born: Bartley Fahey; 15 October 1836 New Quay, County Clare, Ireland
- Died: 9 August 1920 (aged 83) Brisbane, Queensland, Australia
- Resting place: Toowong Cemetery
- Spouse: Agnes Anne Corser (m.1876 d.1937)
- Occupation: Harbourmaster

Bartley Fahey (15 October 1836 – 9 August 1920) was member of the Queensland Legislative Council.

== Early life ==
Fahey was born in New Quay, County Clare, Ireland to Peter Fahey and his wife Margaret Mary (née Manning). On his arrival in Australia he worked as a harbourmaster and water police magistrate in several towns across Queensland.

== Political career ==
Fahey was called up to the Queensland Legislative Council in May 1904 and served until his death in August 1920.

== Personal life ==
Fahey married Agnes Anne Corser in 1876, and together had three children.

He died in August 1920 and was buried in Toowong Cemetery.
