= Aughinish, County Clare =

Aughinish Eachinis
- Island and village
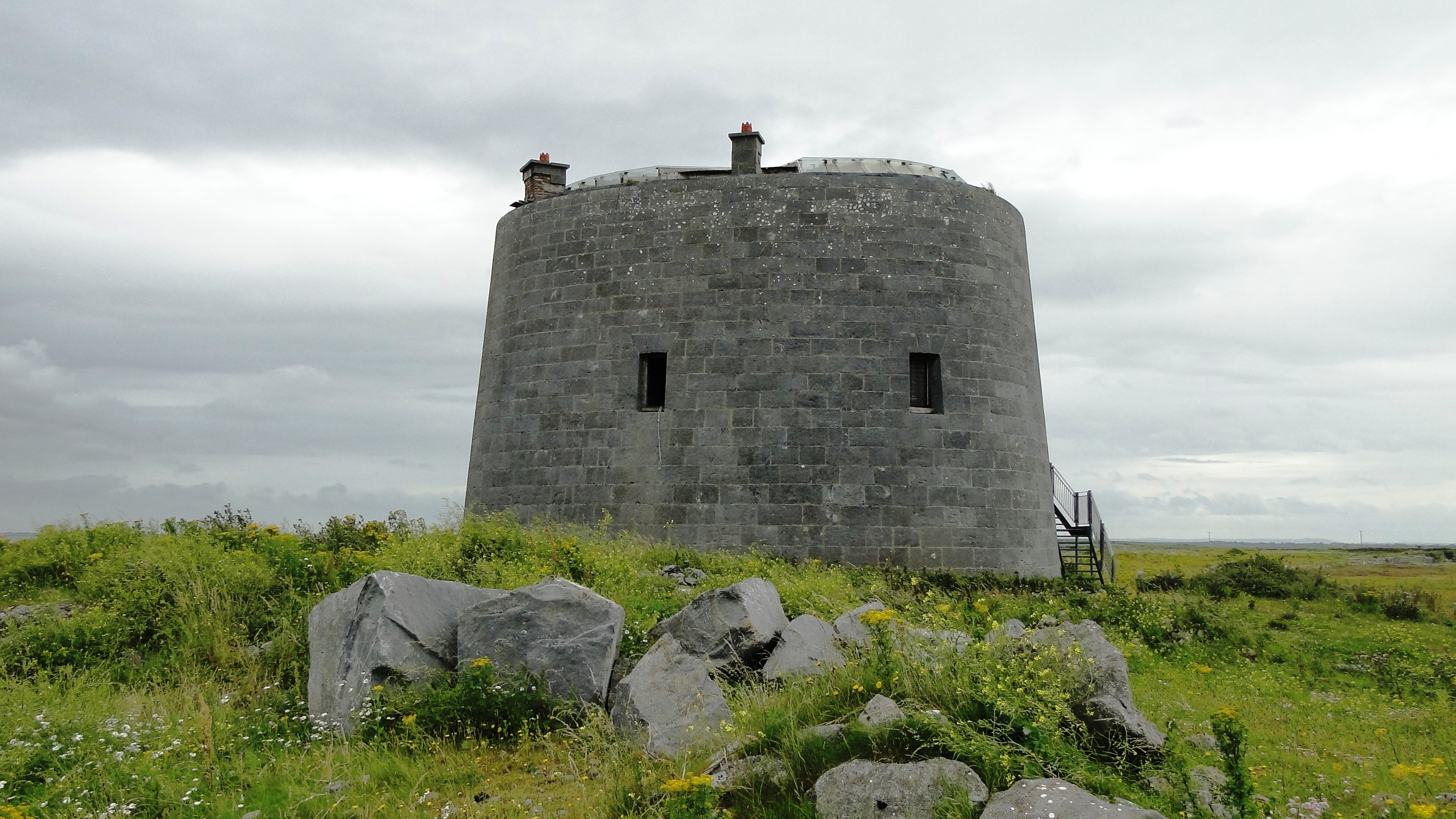
- Aughinish Tower

- Location in Ireland
- Coordinates: 53°09′47″N 9°04′18″W
- Country: Ireland
- County: County Clare

Population (2022)
  - Total: 52
- Time zone: UTC+0 (WET)
  - Summer (DST): UTC-1 (IST (WEST))

Aughinish (Irish: Eachinis), also Aughnish, is a small island and townland in Oughtmama Parish of the Barony of Burren in north County Clare, Ireland. It is on the south shore of Galway Bay, 11 km (7 mi) northwest of Kinvarra. The island is approximately 2 miles (3 km) wide and 1 mile (1.6 km) from the northernmost tip to the southernmost point and has just over fifty inhabitants.

The island was originally connected to County Clare, but that connection was lost due to the tsunami generated by the massive 1755 Lisbon earthquake. The British built the existing 0.5 miles (0.8 km) causeway to County Galway to service their troops in the Martello Tower. To this day, land access to Aughinish, County Clare is still only through County Galway.

== Archaeology ==
A wealth of monuments of archaeological interest attests of life on Aughinish since pre-historic times:

Shell middens are located north-west and south of the island.

A small cyst-like wedge tomb is located on the western side of the island, about 50 meters from its coastline

An early Christian church located on the south western shore of the island has been severely weathered. Only its northern wall subsists in its full length. It has been described as a pre-Romanesque church and was, as early as 2010, mentioned as one of a few Irish churches " in need of urgent and sensitive intervention if they are not to collapse entirely".

A cillín (unconsecrated burial ground) is situated east of the church.

Late medieval seaweed beds, a system used to farm seaweed, used as fertiliser and animal food, are located south of the causeway, and have been described as being "the largest and best preserved of its kind" "of national importance and "extremely vulnerable".

A Martello tower, located at the most northern point of Aughinish, is one of three Martello towers built on Galway Bay (the others being located in Finavarra and Rosaveal) in 1810, as advised by Major-general George Cathcart, to prevent the bay from being an easy landing point for a French invasion. Contrary to earlier Martello towers built in the Dublin area, these 3 towers are cam shaped.

== In literature ==
Writer and folklorist Lady Gregory whose summer house, Mount Vernon, is facing Aughinish, mentions the island in her book "Visions and beliefs in the West of Ireland": "At Aughinish, there were two couples came to the shore to be married".
