= Newtown Castle =

Tower house, County Clare, Ireland

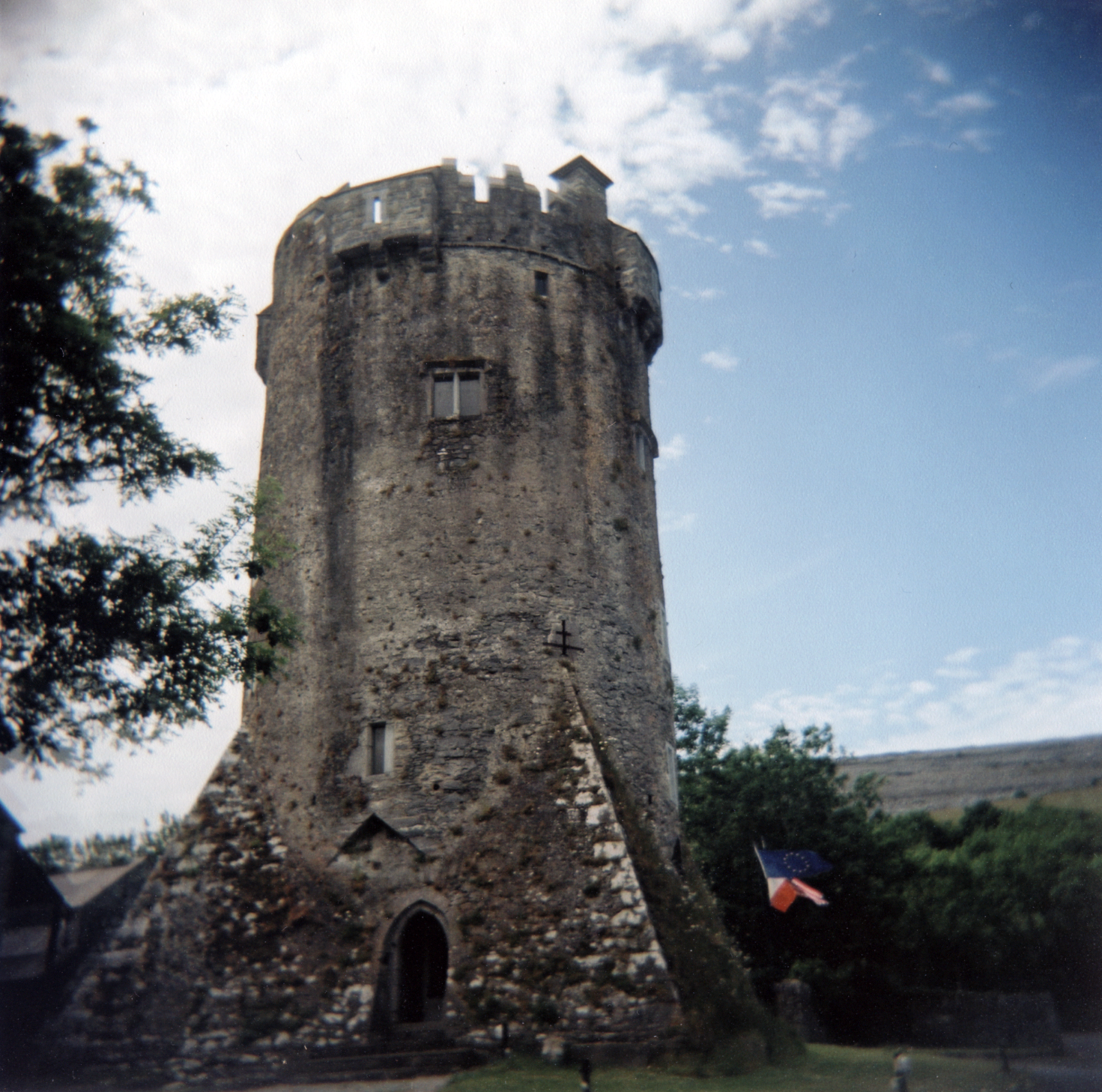
- Newtown Castle prior to restoration

- Location within Ireland

General information
- Location: Ballyvaughan, County Clare, Ireland
- Coordinates: 53.103861°N 9.169228°W
- Completed: 16th century
- Client: O'Brien Clan

Newtown Castle is a 16th-century tower house, located close to the village of Ballyvaughan within the Burren area of County Clare, Ireland. Uniquely for a tower house of its type in Ireland, it is cylindrical in shape above a square pyramidal base. It is today part of the Burren College of Art.

== History ==
Newtown Castle was likely built circa 1550 for the O'Brien clan. In the Forfeitures and Distribution books of 1641 it was listed as property of Donogh O'Brien. It soon passed into possession of the O'Lochlainn (or O'Loghlen) family, the most powerful clan of the area. The Ordnance Survey of 1839 names Charles O'Loghlen as inhabitant of the castle and describes the tower as being in good repair. Charles O'Loghlen was locally known as the "King of the Burren".

In 1848, the landlord, the then Marquess of Buckingham who had been bankrupted sold the local lands. The Buckingham estates in County Clare, around 7,000 acres (28 km^{2}) in the Barony of Burren were purchased for 30,000 pounds by one Richard Samuel Guinness, acting as agent for Colonel Henry White.

At the time of the Griffith's valuation in the 1850s, the building next to the castle, erected in about 1820, was a rectory inhabited by the Reverend Hugh B. Howlett.

At the end of the 19th century Peter O'Loghlen lived in the castle. He was referred to as the "Prince of the Burren".

During reconstruction (see below) limited excavations were conducted at Newtown Castle. The results indicated that the castle may be late 16th or early 17th century, rather than mid-16th century. Signs of the presence of a significant population (animal and shellfish remains and a large cobbled space) were also discovered in the area. This gave rise to speculation whether the name "Newtown" may actually have referred to a new settlement near the castle.

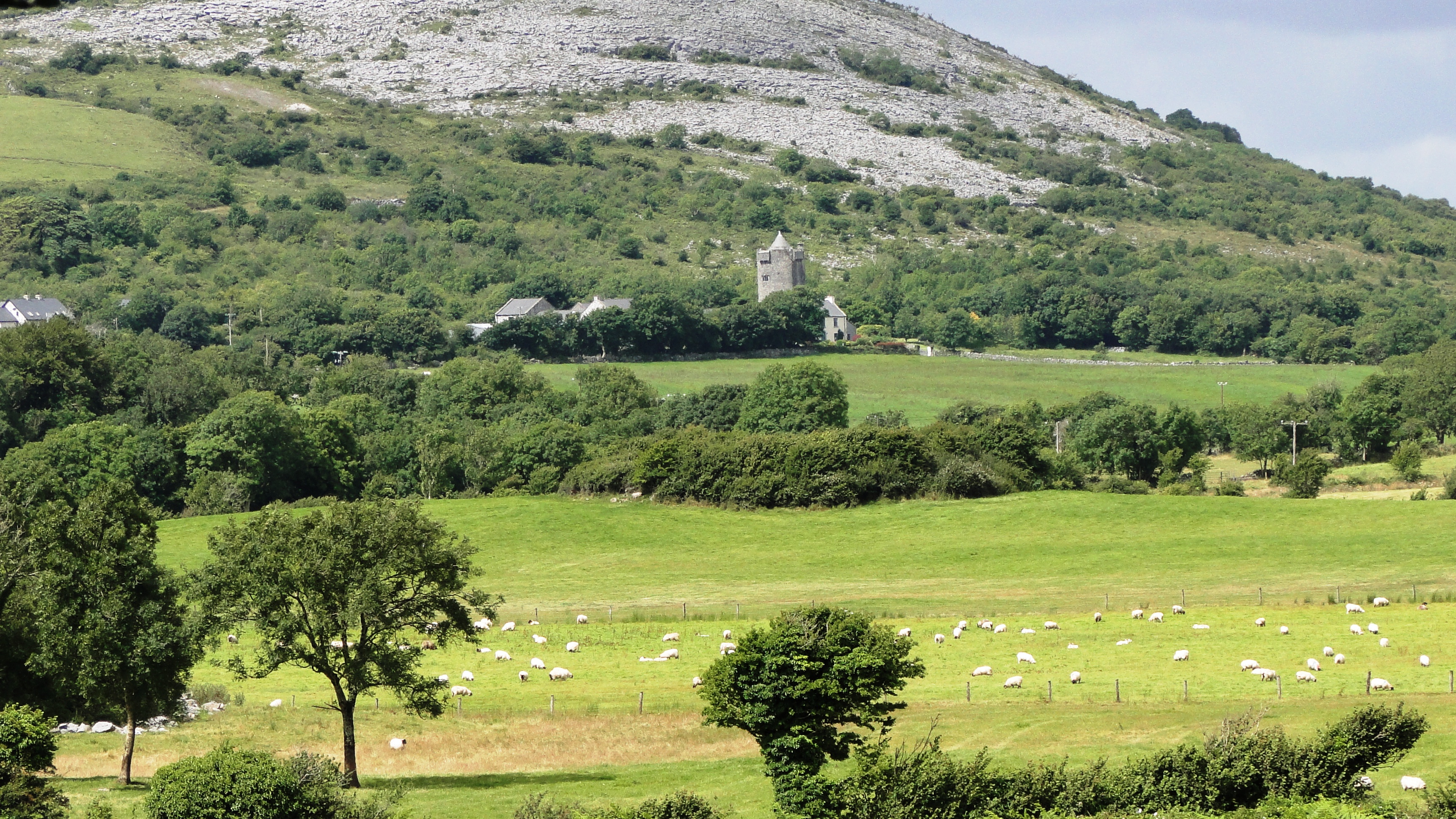
Newtown Castle and its surroundings viewed from the earth fort An Ráth.

Newtown Castle was restored in 1993–94 for use by the newly established Burren College of Art, which was opened by president Mary Robinson in 1994. It is available as a venue for weddings and conferences, located on the Burren Way, a long distance trail. The castle is in the townland of Newton, parish of Drumcreehy.

== Architecture ==
Newtown Castle is one of only a few cylindrical tower houses in the area. In all of Ireland, only around 30 of the roughly 3,000 tower houses are round. Its unusual pyramidical base makes it unique in all of Ireland.

The tower has four upper floors. The ground floor and first floor feature vaulted ceilings. There are gun-loops on the first floor. A doorway at second-floor level may have connected with a long vanished adjacent building. These features and the mouldings of the windows point to a sixteenth-century date. The tower was restored for use as the Burren College of Art with a conical oak roof and opened in July 1994 by Mary Robinson.
