= Drumcreehy =

Drumcreehy Droim Críche
- Parish
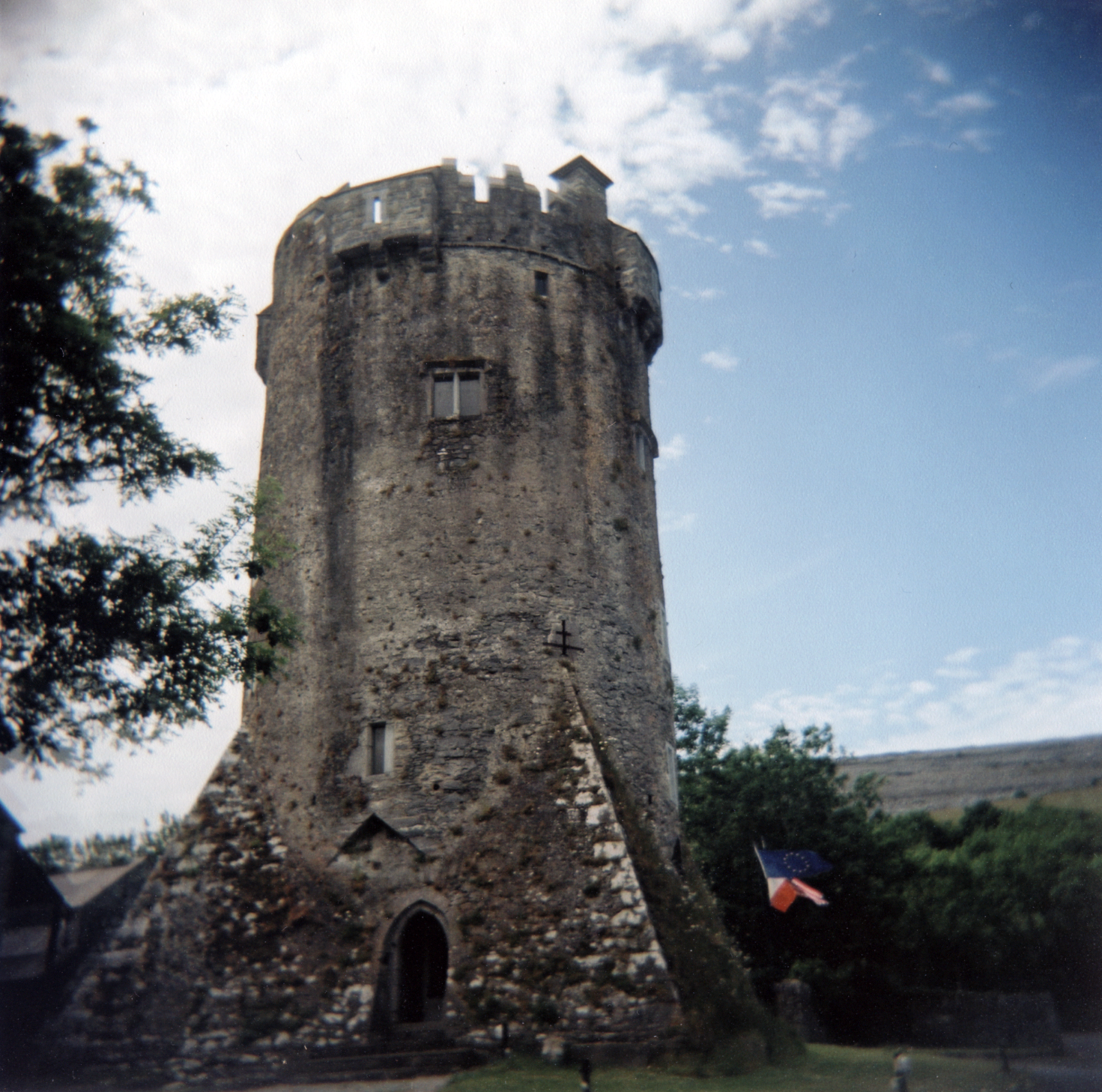
- Newtown Castle

- Location within Ireland
- Coordinates: 53°06′54″N 9°08′59″W
- Country: Ireland
- Province: Munster
- County: County Clare
- Time zone: UTC+0 (WET)
  - Summer (DST): UTC-1 (IST (WEST))

Drumcreehy or Dromcreehy (Irish: Droim Críche) is a civil parish in County Clare, Ireland. It contains the village of Ballyvaughan.

== Name ==
The name "Drumcreehy" comes from the situation of the original parish church on a hillside or ridge in the territory of Crioch Maille or Droim Críche, possibly derived from Droim Críche Uí Maille ("the ridge of O'Malley's territory").

== Location ==
The parish is in the north of the Barony of Burren on Ballyvaughan bay, on the south shore of Galway Bay. It is 10.5 miles (16.9 km) northwest of Corofin. The parish is 4 by 2 miles (6.4 by 3.2 km) and covers 6,285 acres (2,543 ha). The land was once rocky and mountainous, and mostly unsuitable for farming. It rises to 1,023 feet (312 m) above sea level at Cappanavalla hill on the western boundary.

== History ==
A battle was fought in 1317 beside Lough Rask which is near Ballyvaughan.

In 1834 there was neither church, chapel nor school in the parish. Villages in 1845 were Ballyvaughan, Ballyconree, Ballinacraggy and Loughrask. In 1841 the population was 2,331 in 362 houses, mostly living along the coastline.

== Antiquities ==
There are many stone ringforts and caves in varying condition in the parish.

Attempts to date the church of Drumcreehy currently place its construction from the 11th/12th to the 13th/14th century. A church definitely existed here in the 14th century as it was mentioned in a tax list, but at the time likely consisted only of the nave (collapsed today). The chancel was probably added only in the 15th or 16trh century. As of 1897 the church was partly ruined, surrounded by a large cemetery. A few hundred meters from the church there are the remains of a religious house on the lands called "The Bishop’s Quarter", but there are no records of the establishment. The Bishop of Kilfenora drew rent from 120 acres of land here in the early 17th century.

The parish contains the remains of four castles or tower houses:

- Ballyvaughan Castle (Baile-Ui-Beachain) stood on the edge of the small harbor in the village. It has now almost entirely disappeared.
- The two castles named Muckinish (Muck inis, Irish for pig island) were reportedly built within three years of each other in the 15th century (Nua means new, Sean means old). As of 1897, Muckinish Nua (or Muckinish Noe), on the bay of Pouldoody, was badly damaged. Shanmuckinish Castle ( or Seanmuckinish, Shan Muckinish) was repaired around 1836, and as of 1897 was habitable. The National Inventory of Architectural Heritage describes the latter as: "remains of free-standing square-plan single bay four-storey rubble stone-built tower house, c. 1450." Both ruins reach almost to their original height of around 17 m and are partially collapsed, exposing a cross-sectional view of the interior floors. Due to the similarities of their names the chronology of ownership is confused. Shanmuckinish was also known for a time as Ballynacragga Castle. This may be an indication that the MacNamara family lived here, bringing the name of their family castle near Dromoland Castle from which they were expelled in 1654. Otherwise, both Muckinish castles were inhabited up to the 19th century by members of the O'Loghlen, Neylon and Blake families.
- Newtown Castle has been completely restored and houses the Burren College of Art.

All four castles were owned by an O'Loghlen in 1580.

== Townlands ==
Townlands are Acres, Ballycahill, Ballyconry, Ballyvaughan, Bishopsquarter, Dangan, Killoghil, Knocknagroagh, Lisnanard, Loughrask, Muckinish East, Muckinish West, Newtown and Tonarussa.

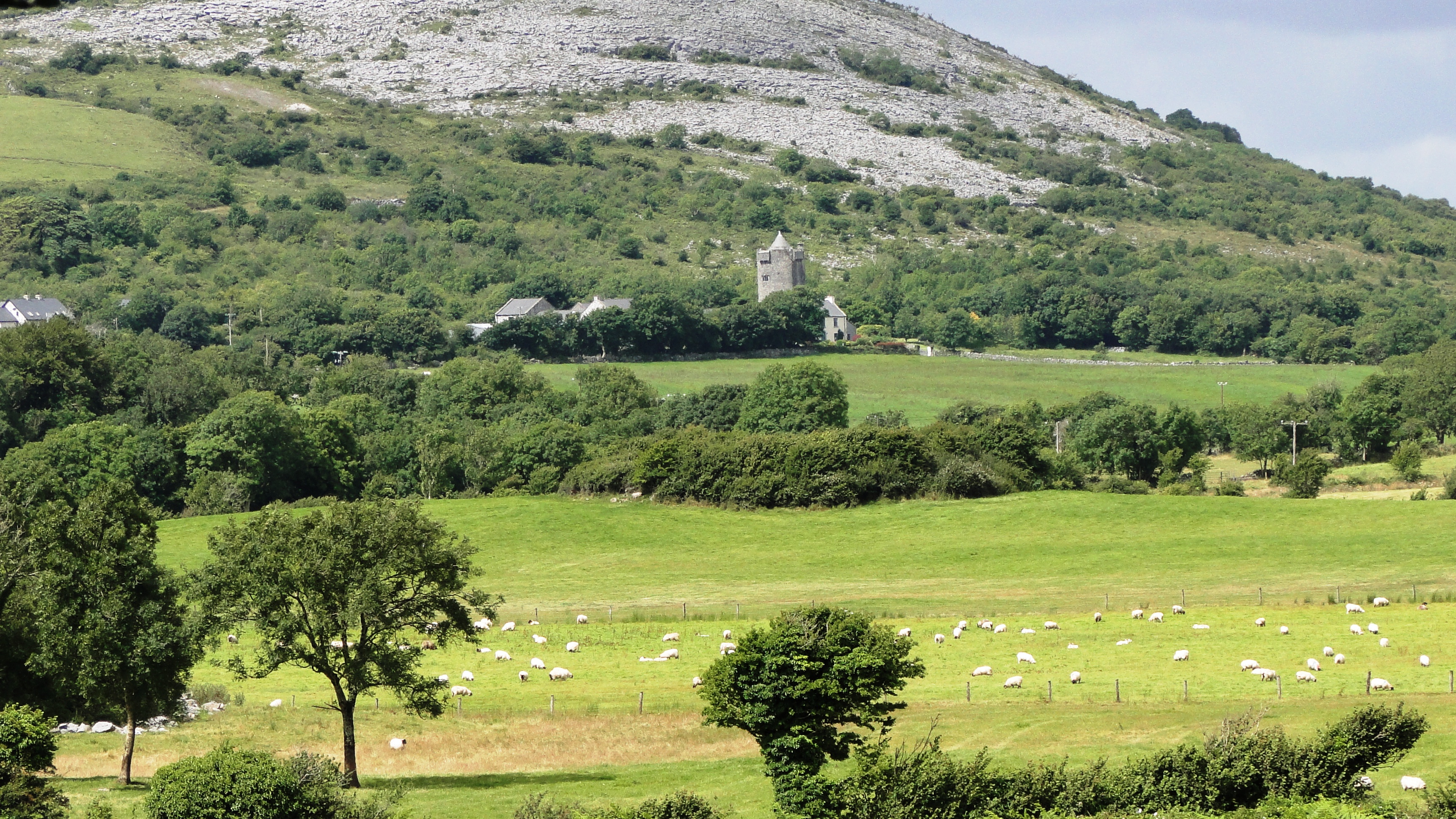
Newtown Castle viewed from An Rath

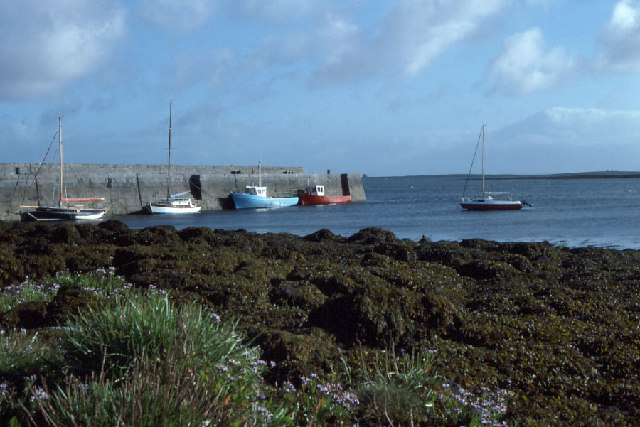
Ballyvaughan harbour and pier

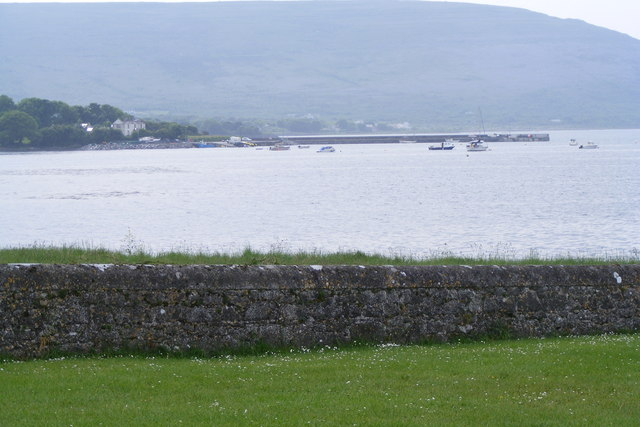
Quay and Ballyvaughan Bay

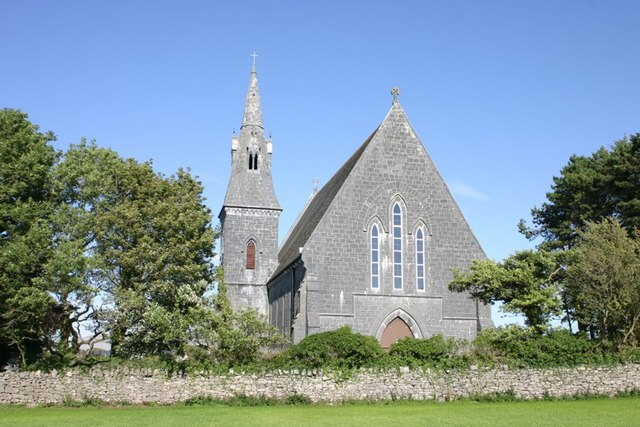
Church of St John, Ballyvaughan

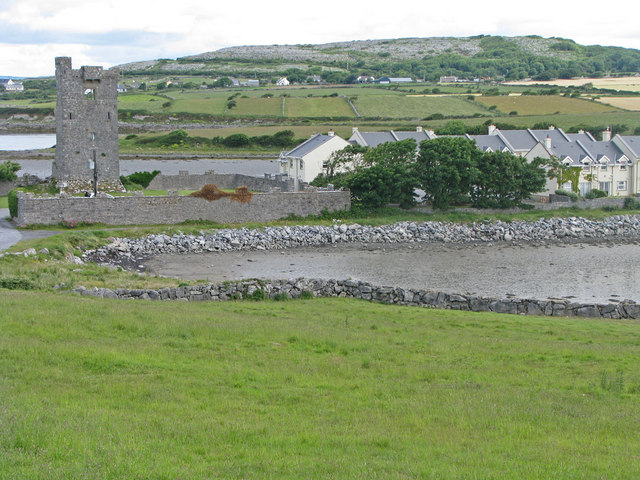
Shanmuckinish Castle and modern houses
