= Shanmuckinish Castle =

Tower house, County Clare, Ireland

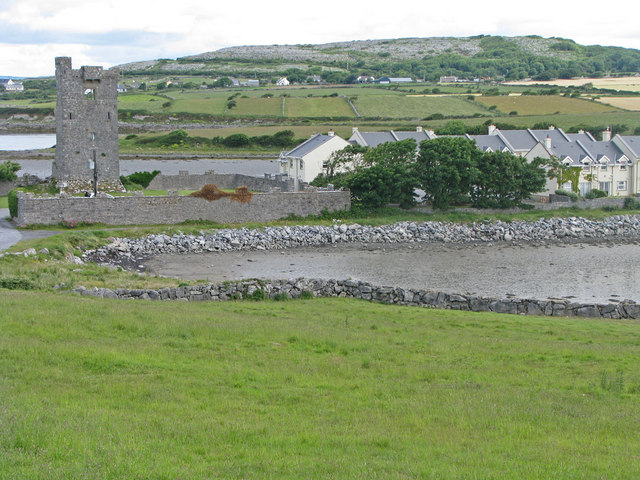
- Shanmuckinish Castle and modern houses

- Location within Ireland
- Alternative names: Seanmuckinish Castle

General information
- Status: ruined
- Type: tower house
- Coordinates: 53°8′20″N 9°6′9″W
- Groundbreaking: 15th century

Shanmuckinish Castle (or Seanmuckinish Castle) (Muck inis, Irish for pig island) is a ruined tower house located in Drumcreehy civil parish of County Clare, Ireland.

== Location ==
The castle is located on the narrowest part of a small peninsula in the townland of Muckinish West, parish of Drumcreehy, close to the N67 coastal road. The closest town is Ballyvaughan.

== History ==
There are two castles named Muckinish that were reportedly built within three years of each other in the 15th century (Nua means new, Sean means old). Shanmuckinish was repaired around 1836, and as of 1897 was habitable.

Due to the similarities of the names of the two castles the chronology of ownership is confused. Shanmuckinish was also known for a time as "Ballynacragga Castle". This may be an indication that the MacNamara family lived here, bringing the name of their family castle near Dromoland Castle from which they were expelled in 1654. Otherwise, both Muckinish castles were inhabited up to the 19th century by members of the O'Loghlen, Neylon and Blake families.

== Description ==
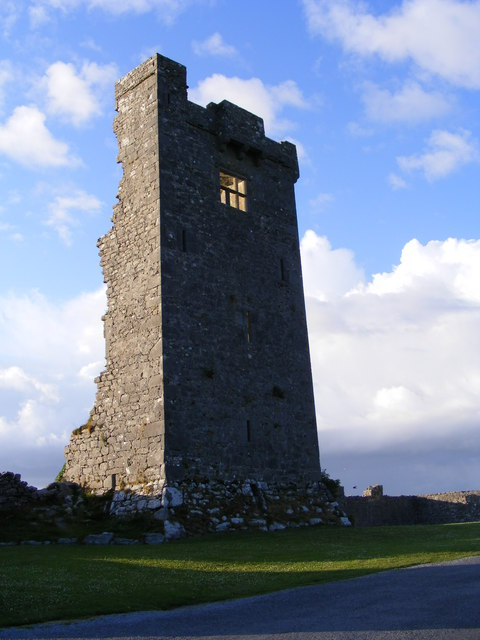
Close up view of the ruin

The National Inventory of Architectural Heritage describes the tower house as the "remains of free-standing square-plan single bay four-storey rubble stone-built tower house, c. 1450." It reaches almost to its original height of around 17 m and is partially collapsed, exposing a cross-sectional view of the interior floors. The stairways have not survived. However, the ruin still features the remains of two vaulted ceilings, intramural passages and stairs. The lower windows are defensive loops, while the upper floors feature larger decorative windows. A bawn wall survives and is in relatively good repair due to work in the 18th and 19th centuries. The first floor reception room had a large fireplace in the west wall and still extant internal wall rendering. The house also has a wall walk and machicolations (of the original four only two survive).
