= Burren (barony) =

Barony of Burren
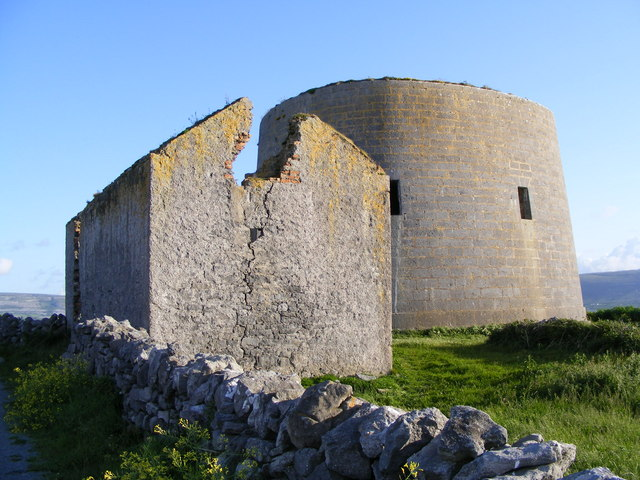
- Finavarra Martello Tower

- Location within Ireland
- Coordinates: 53.06822°N 9.183887°W
- Country: Ireland
- Province: Munster
- County: Clare

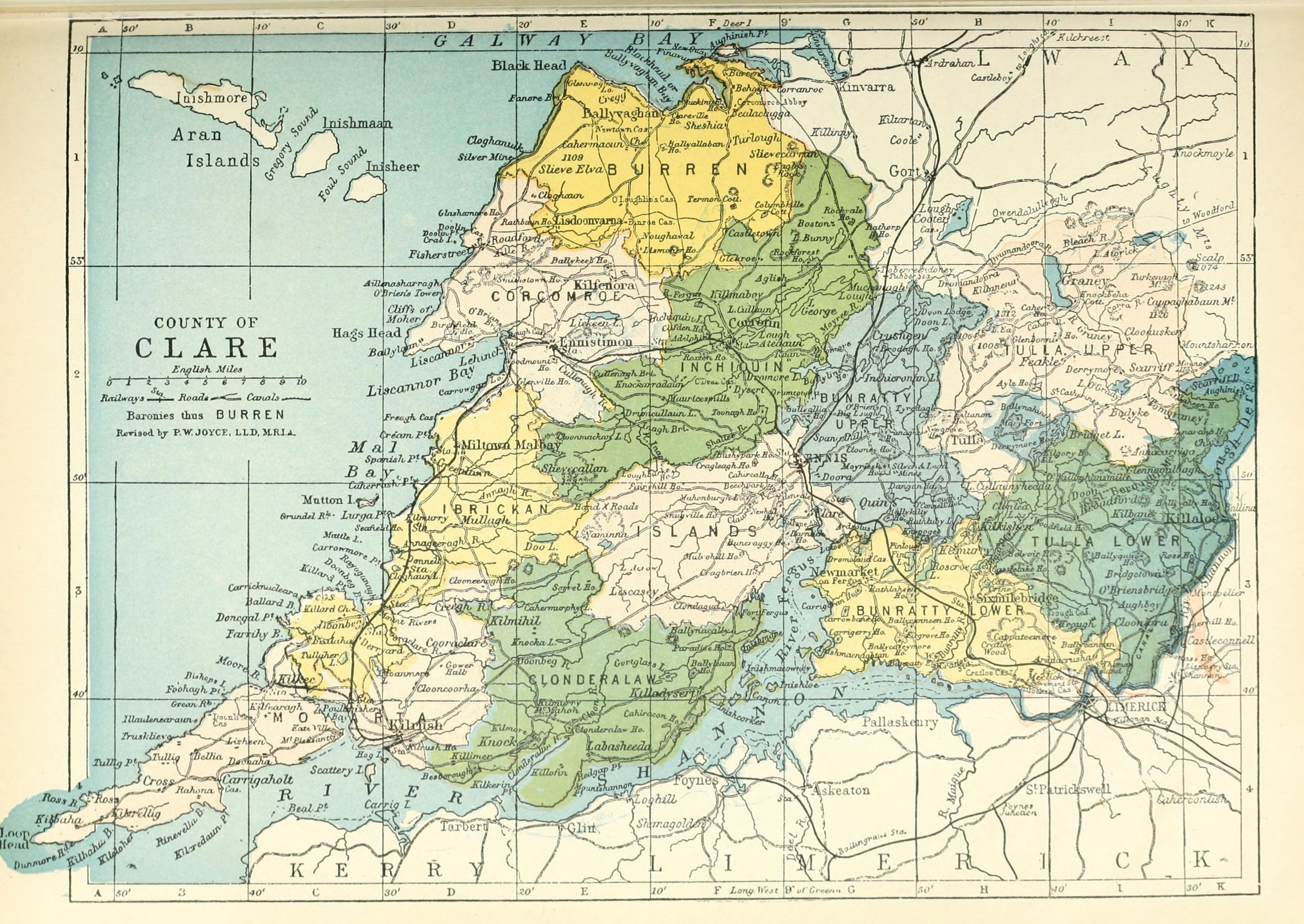
Baronies of Clare. Burren is the furthest north.

The Barony of Burren is a geographical division of County Clare, Ireland, that in turn is divided into civil parishes. It covers a large part of the Burren.

== Legal context ==
Baronies were created after the Norman invasion of Ireland as divisions of counties and were used the administration of justice and the raising of revenue. While baronies continue to be officially defined units, they have been administratively obsolete since 1898. However, they continue to be used in land registration and in specification, such as in planning permissions. In many cases, a barony corresponds to an earlier Gaelic túath which had submitted to the Crown.

== Landscape ==
The Parliamentary Gazetteer of Ireland 1845 describes the barony as follows:

A maritime barony of County Clare, Munster. It is bounded, on the north, by Galway bay; on the east, by County Galway and the barony of Inchiquin; on the south, by the baronies of Inchiquin and Corcomroe; and on the west, by the South Sound, which separates it from the Arran Islands. Its greatest length, from east to west, is 15 miles; its greatest breadth, from north to south, is 9 miles; and its area is 74,361 acres.

The general features of the greater part of the barony of Burrin, are altogether different from those of any other part of the country. In the central portion of this district, the entire surface seems one unbroken mass of limestone rock; and the bare hills, rising from the shore to a great elevation, in regularly receding terraced flights, present a vast amphitheatrical outline. The disjointed blocks, composing the surface of this immense concavity, though not deposited with all the precision of the trap rocks, are laid generally in horizontal lines, giving to the whole, at a distance, a regular and formal character.

The more elevated parts are destitute of herbage, and present to the eye an arid, cold, and joyless waste, unchanged by either summer's sun or winter's cold, and but little varied by either light or shade." [Fraser's Guide.] Yet the upland grounds, though extremely rocky, produce a short sweet herbage; and annually nourish vast numbers of sheep for the great fair of Ballinasloe. The west coast presents a gently curved line to the sea; and the north coast is intricately indented by the ramifications of Blackhead bay. The streams are all indigenous and inconsiderable.

== History ==
The district was once called Cean-gan, which means "the external promontory". Ptolemy wrote this name as Gan-ganii. Later it was called Hy-Loch-Lean, which means "the district on the waters of the sea". In 1841 the population of the barony was 12,786 in 2,056 houses, mostly engaged in agriculture.

== Parishes and settlements ==
The barony contains the civil parishes of Abbey, Carran, Drumcreehy, Glaninagh, Kilcorney, Kilonahan, Kilheny, Kilmoon, Noughoval, Oughtmama, and Rathborney. It contains the settlements of Abbey, Burren, Behagh, Bealaclugga, Currenroe, Ballyvaughan, Ballyconree, Ballinacraggy, Loughrusk, Gleninagh, Murroghkelly, Murroghtwohy, Fermoyle, New Quay, Noughaval, Aughnish and Finavara.
