= Kilcorney, County Clare =

Civil parish in County Clare, Ireland

Kilcorney Cill Choirne
- Civil parish
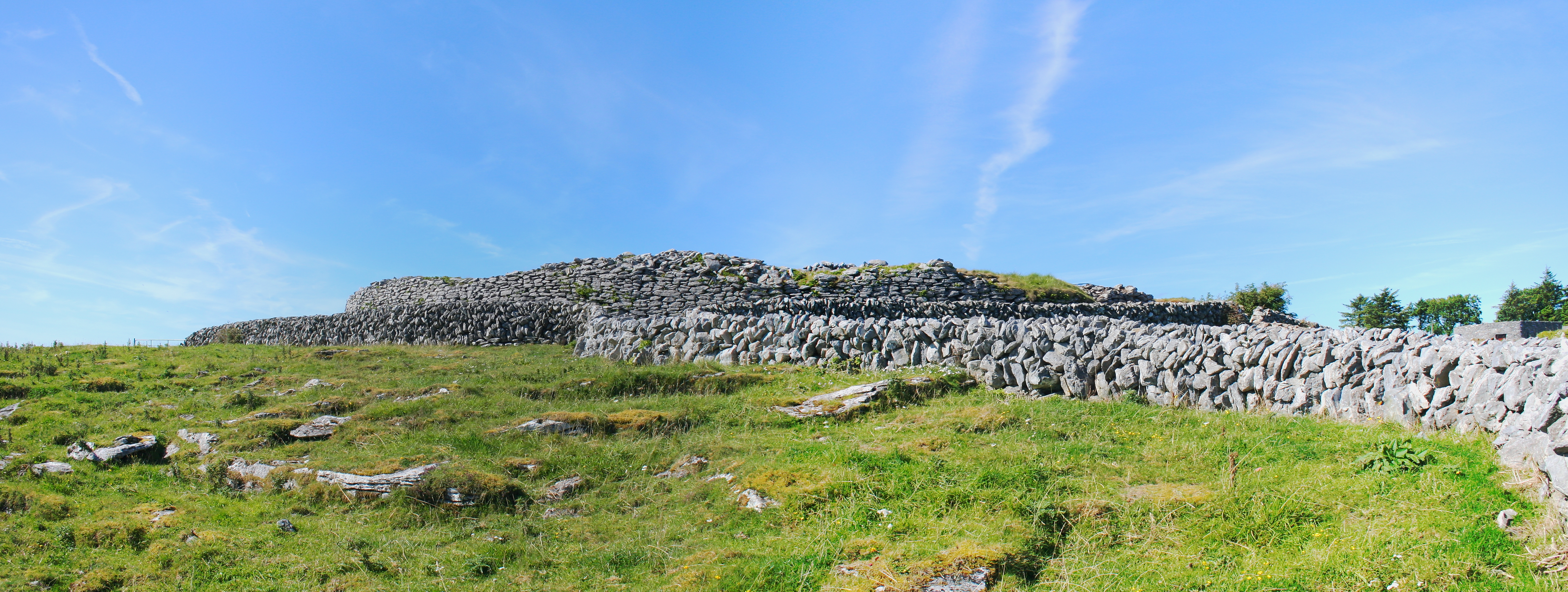
- Caherconnell ringfort

- Location in Ireland
- Coordinates: 53.039949°N 9.153288°W
- Country: Ireland
- Province: Munster
- County: County Clare
- Time zone: UTC+0 (WET)
  - Summer (DST): UTC-1 (IST (WEST))

Kilcorney (Irish: Cill Choirne) (sometimes also Kilcornane) is a civil parish in County Clare, Ireland. It lies in the Burren region of the northwest of the county.

== Location ==
It is located in the Barony of Burren, 7 miles (11 km) north of Corofin. The parish is 3.5 by 1.75 miles (5.63 by 2.82 km) and covers 3,352 acres (1,357 ha). The land is typical of the broken, rocky and hilly country of the Burren. In 1841 the population was 330 in 50 houses.

== Antiquities ==
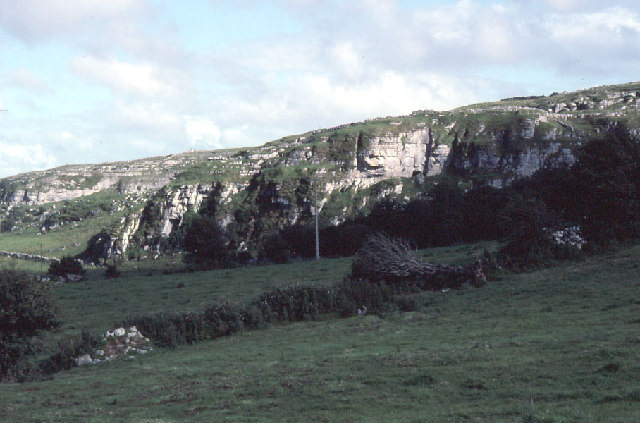
Cliff with the "Cave of the Wild Horses"

Kilcorney parish was in existence by 1302. It was the smallest parish in the diocese of Kilfenora, ranking 21st out of 23 in the taxation list of 1302–6. Given that, the size of the parish church was surprisingly large and it also sported a chancel, not a standard feature in local parish churches. It may have benefitted from financial support by the O'Loghlen family, owners of Caherconnell cashel as well as the tower houses (castles) at Glensleade and Lissylisheen, all within 2 km of the church.

The parish contains caves, a cromlech, and the ruins of an old castle. There is a cave in Kilcorney townland (Cave of the Wild Horses) that is the subject of several legends. One is that an enchanted horse came from this cave and propagated its breed throughout the country.

Poulnabrone Dolmen is a portal tomb, dating back to the Neolithic period, and situated 9.6 km (6.0 mi) north-west of the village of Kilnaboy.

Kilcorney Church lies south of the present day road. No information is extant about its founding. There are references to a St Coirné, but no saint of this name is known. The old church of Kilcorney was extremely dilapidated in 1897.

Nearby there was the site of an older church dedicated to the same saint some way from the present ruin.

In addition, around 350 m to the west of the old church there are the barely discernible ruins of an ancient ecclesiastical building known as Kilcolmanbara, dedicated to Saint Colman Bairé, presumably the same as Saint Colman Mac Duach. It may have been in use in 1675 when a deed mentioned a tract of land named Cille Cholmáin Bháire but was certainly abandoned by 1839. There are several holy wells nearby, possibly associated with pilgrimage to the site. The holy well of Tobar na nAingeal (well of angels, eye cures) is near the church. Another holy well, Tobar Colman Bairé (also eye cures), is in Glensleade townland, about 1.5 km north of Kilcolmanbara. Another is Tobar Inghine Bhaoith (cure for warts).

Since coirneach means tonsured or tonsured person, the site may have been an early monastic establishment, which also gave its name to the parish. Thus Cill Coirneach would have been the "church of the monks".

There are various ruined stone or earth forts. These include Carher-na-mweela in the townland of Poulgorm, Caher-an-ard-dorais, Glensleade, Lisnanroum, Liscolmanbara, Lissaniska in Eanty beg south and Lissananima in Eanty beg north. Liscolman cashel near the Kilcolmanbara church may have been named for Colman, too. The castle of Glensleade belonged to a member of the O’Loghlen family in 1580. By 1897, it had been levelled to the ground.

Caherconnell cashel is an early medieval, well-preserved ringfort, located in the townland of Caherconnell, on the R480 road to Ballyvaughan.

== Townlands ==
Townlands are Ballymihil, Baur North, Baur South, Caherconnell, Eantybeg North, Eantybeg South, Eantymore, Faherlaghroe, Glensleade, Kilcorney, Kilcorney Glebe, Lisnanroum, Magheraweeleen, Poulanine, Poulbaun, Poulgorm, Poulnabrone and Poulnaskagh.

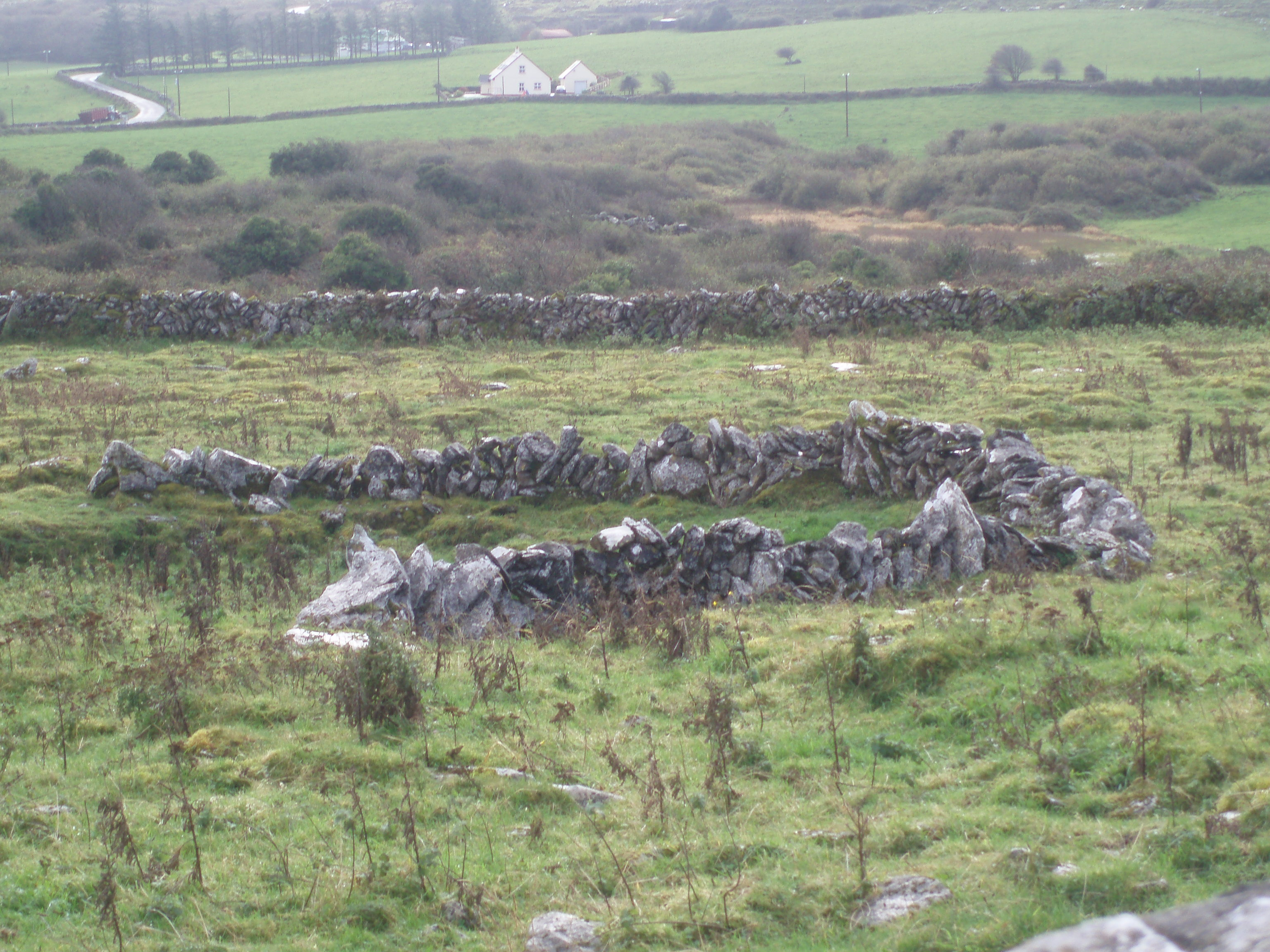
Stone walls outside Caherconnell ringfort

Poulnabrone dolmen, a Neolithic portal tomb about 1 kilometre (0.62 mi) north of Caherconnell ringfort.
