= Carron/New Quay =

- Roman Catholic parish
- Location in Ireland
- Coordinates: 53°02′06″N 9°04′35″W
- Country: Ireland
- Province: Munster
- County: County Clare

Government
  - Dáil Éireann: Clare
- Time zone: UTC+0 (WET)
  - Summer (DST): UTC-1 (IST (WEST))

Carron/New Quay is a parish in County Clare, Ireland, and part of the Kilfenora Deanery of the Roman Catholic Diocese of Galway, Kilmacduagh and Kilfenora. It is located in the northern side of The Burren, bordering Galway Bay and County Galway

Fr. Colm Clinton, a member of Saint Patrick's Society for the Foreign Missions (SPS) was the parish priest for 17 years until his retirement in 2023. The priest of the neighbouring parish of Ballyvaughan/Fanore now also covers Carron/New Quay in addition to his own parish.

The parish is an amalgamation of the former parishes of Abbey, Kilcorney, Noughaval and Oughtmama.

The main church of Carron/New Quay parish is the St. Columba Church in Carron, built in 1861 by Fr. James Gleeson. The second church of the parish is the Church of St. Patrick in New Quay. The original church from 1840 was later replaced by a new one that was blessed in 1939. The third church of the parish is the Church of St. Mochua in Noughaval. This was originally a Protestant church in 1860, located in Ballyvaughan, but carefully taken apart and moved to Noughaval. It entered service again in 1943.
