= Noughaval =

Civil parish in County Clare, Ireland

Noughaval Nuachabháil or Nua Chongbhail
- Civil parish
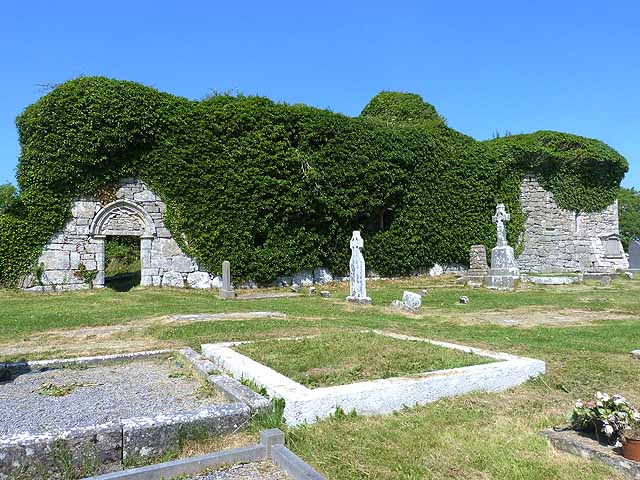
- Ruins of the medieval church at Noughaval

- Location within Ireland
- Coordinates: 53°01′00″N 9°10′57″W
- Country: Ireland
- Province: Munster
- County: County Clare
- Time zone: UTC+0 (WET)
  - Summer (DST): UTC-1 (IST (WEST))

Noughaval or Nohoval (Irish: Nuachabháil) is a civil parish in County Clare, Ireland.

== Name ==
The name of the parish means 'new acquisition' or 'new settlement'.

== Geography ==
The parish lies on the southern boundary of the Barony of Burren. It is 2.25 miles (3.62 km) to the north of Kilfenora. It is 4 by 2 miles (6.4 by 3.2 km) and covers 4,661 acres (1,886 ha).

The land is mostly rocky limestone pasture, with little land suitable for cultivation. It slopes up to an altitude of 635 feet (194 m) in the north of the parish. Lough Aleenaun lies in the east.

== Antiquities ==
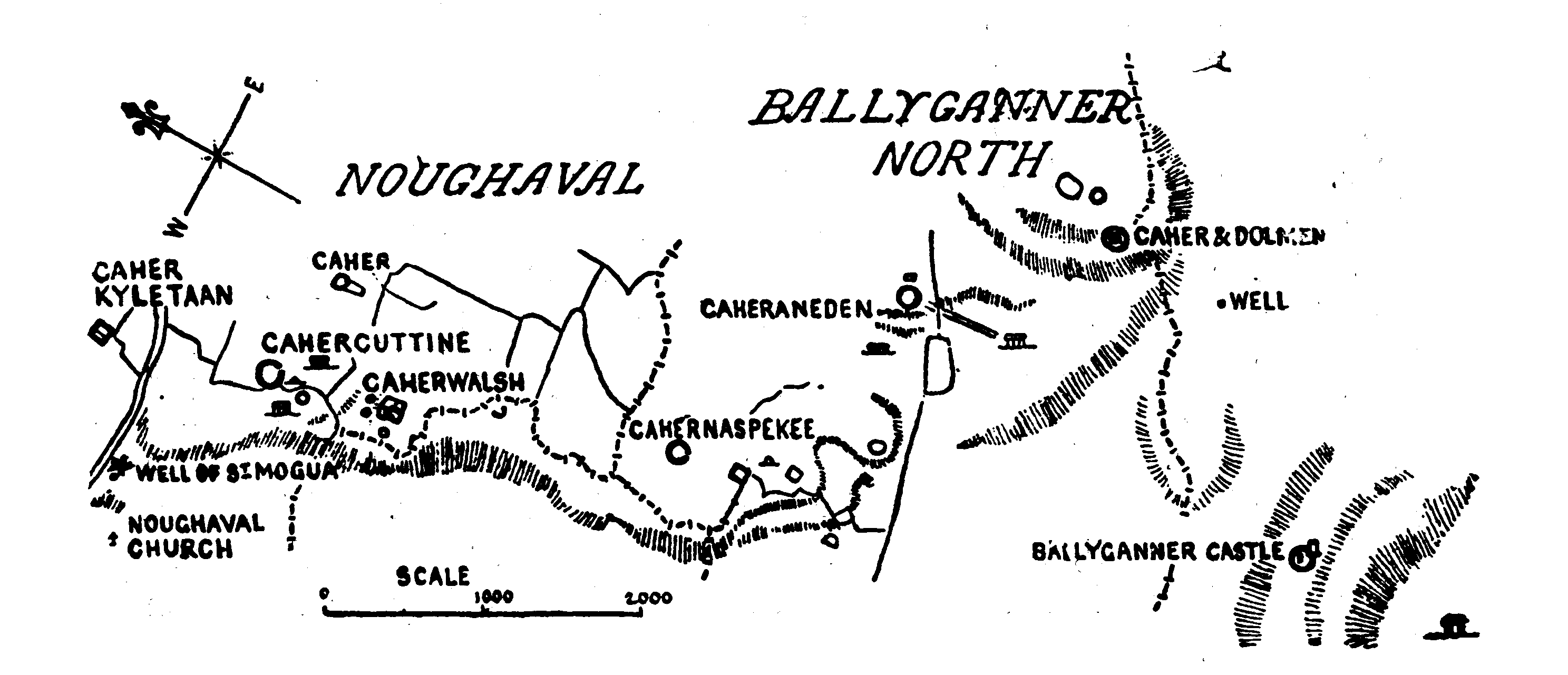
Map by T.J. Westropp showing the antiquities of Noughaval and Ballyganner North townlands, 1897

The old church was in fair condition in 1897, with a nave and a choir surrounded by a cemetery. There is a holy well nearby dedicated to Saint Colman MacDuach.

Parts of the church may date to the early medieval period, and it may have been the site of a monastic settlement. This is indicated by the remains of outbuildings and the shape of some field walls. The nave shows early medieval masonry.

The parish contains several souterrains built of limestone flags, either hiding places or storage rooms. There are many cahers, or stone forts, now ruined. The parish has several cromlechs. There is an exceptionally large cromlech at Ballyganner. The table stone is almost 40 by 10 feet (12.2 by 3.0 m) in dimensions, supported by upright flagstones and rising about 6 feet (1.8 m) above the ground.

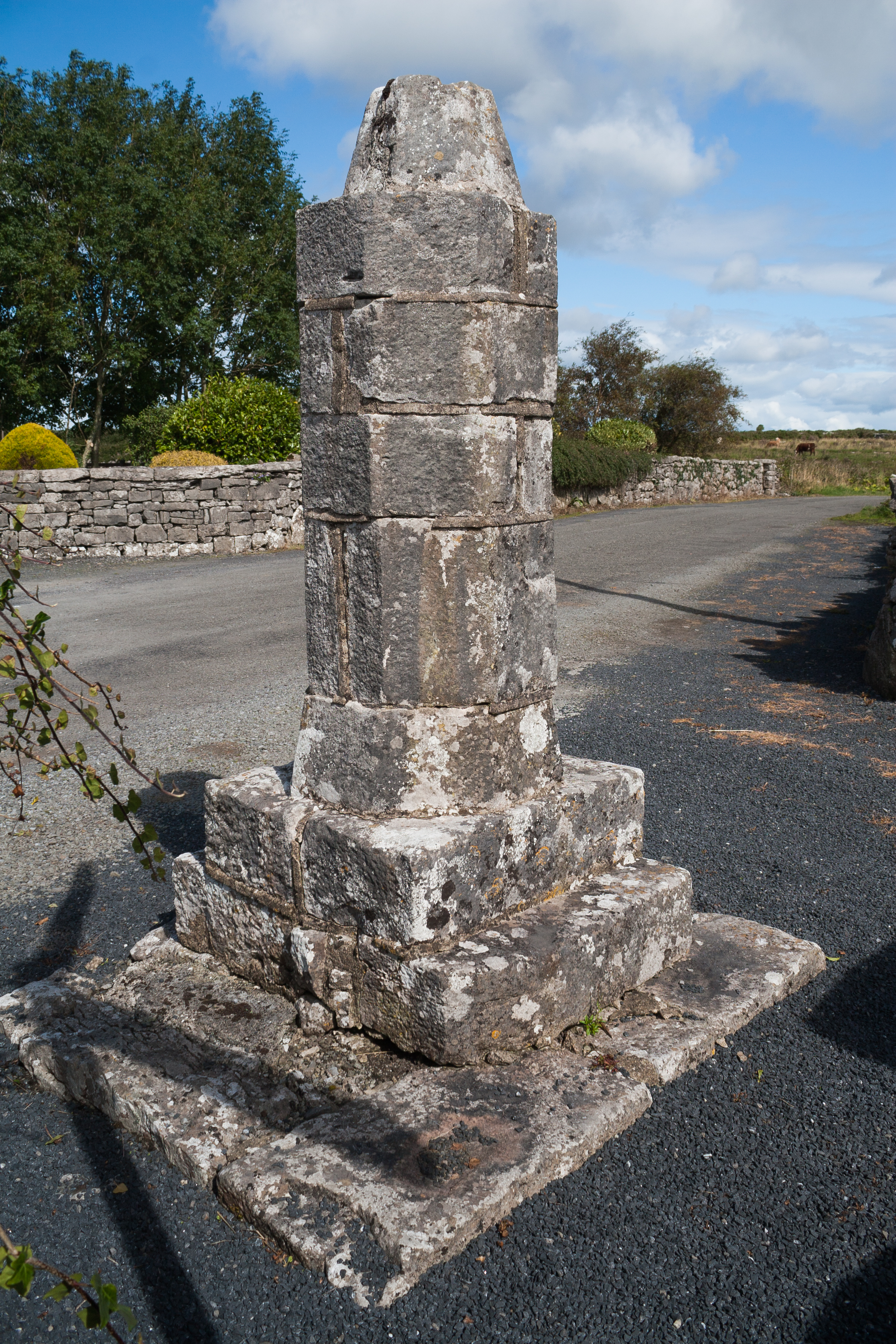
"Market cross"

A stone pillar near the church is said to be a market cross, and some lines drawn on were used as measures of length. The shaft is octagonal and stands on a stepped dais.

There are three ringforts in the parish, which in the 19th century were held to have been built by "the Danes". The ruins of the old church stand on the glebe in Noughaval. There are ruined castles at Banroe, Ballymurphy and Ballyganner. These were the property of the O’Loghlen family in 1580.

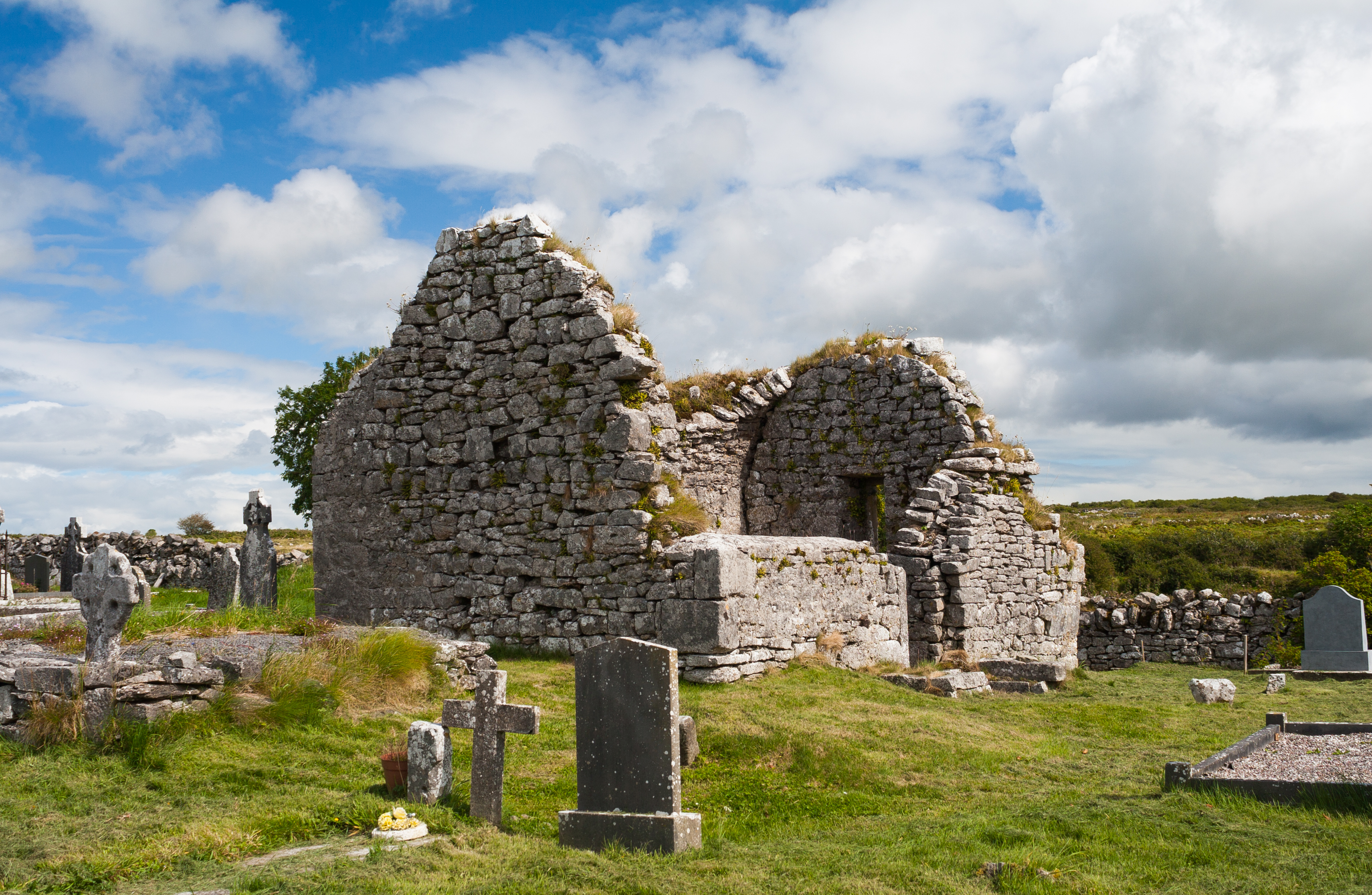
O'Davoran chapel

The medieval church was built and rebuilt from the 12th to the 14th centuries. A later memorial chapel of the O'Davoran family nearby was built (or, according to Thomas Johnson Westropp, repaired) in 1725 by James Davoren.

== History ==
In 1841, the population was 450 in 65 houses. The hamlet of Noughaval had 64 people in 10 houses. In 1845, the Noughaval and Carran chapels were united.

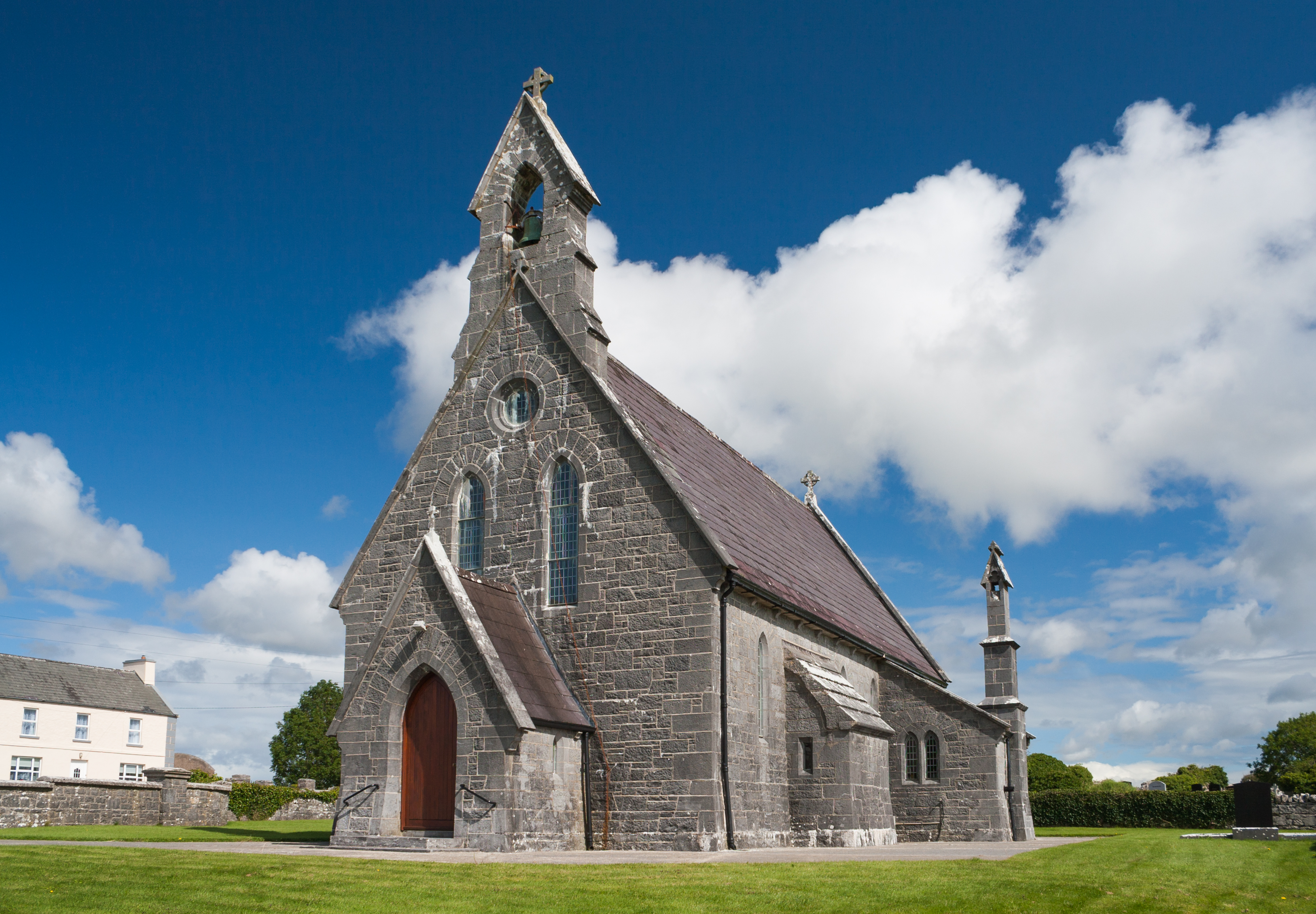
St. Mochua, new RC church

In 1941, the former Church of Ireland church in Ballyvaughan was sold for £25, dismantled and moved here. In 1943, it was reconsecrated as a Roman Catholic church, St. Mochua's Church.

== Townlands ==
Townlands are Ballyganner North, Ballyganner South, Ballymahony, Ballymurphy, Cragnarooan, Deerpark, Kiltaan, Kiltennan North, Kiltennan South, Knockavoarheen, Lismoher, Noughaval, Rusheen and Sheshymore.
