= Noughaval, County Clare =

Village and townland in County Clare, Ireland

Noughaval Nuachabháil
- Village
- Location within Ireland
- Coordinates: 53°01′00″N 9°10′57″W
- Country: Ireland
- Province: Munster
- County: County Clare
- Time zone: UTC+0 (WET)
  - Summer (DST): UTC-1 (IST (WEST))

Noughaval (Irish: Nuachabháil) is a small village in the townland with the same name in County Clare, Ireland.

It is said to be the site where St. Mogua founded a monastery. The name means so much as "new monastic settlement". The old church is from the twelfth century but using older stonework.

The present church is the Church of St. Mochua. This was originally a Protestant church in 1860, located in Ballyvaughan, but carefully disassembled and moved to Noughaval. It entered service again in 1943.

A stone pillar near the church is said to be a market cross.

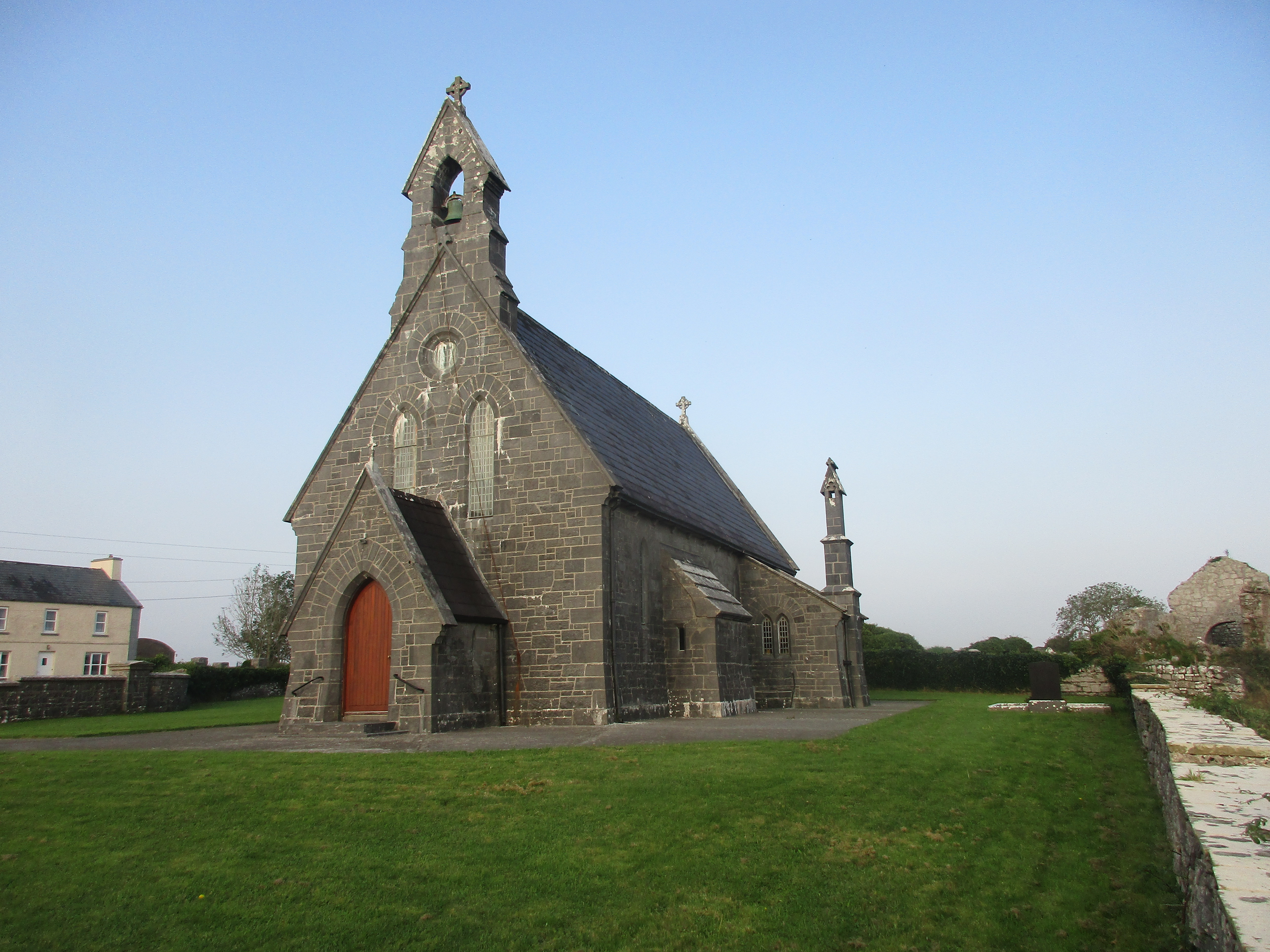
St. Mochua Church

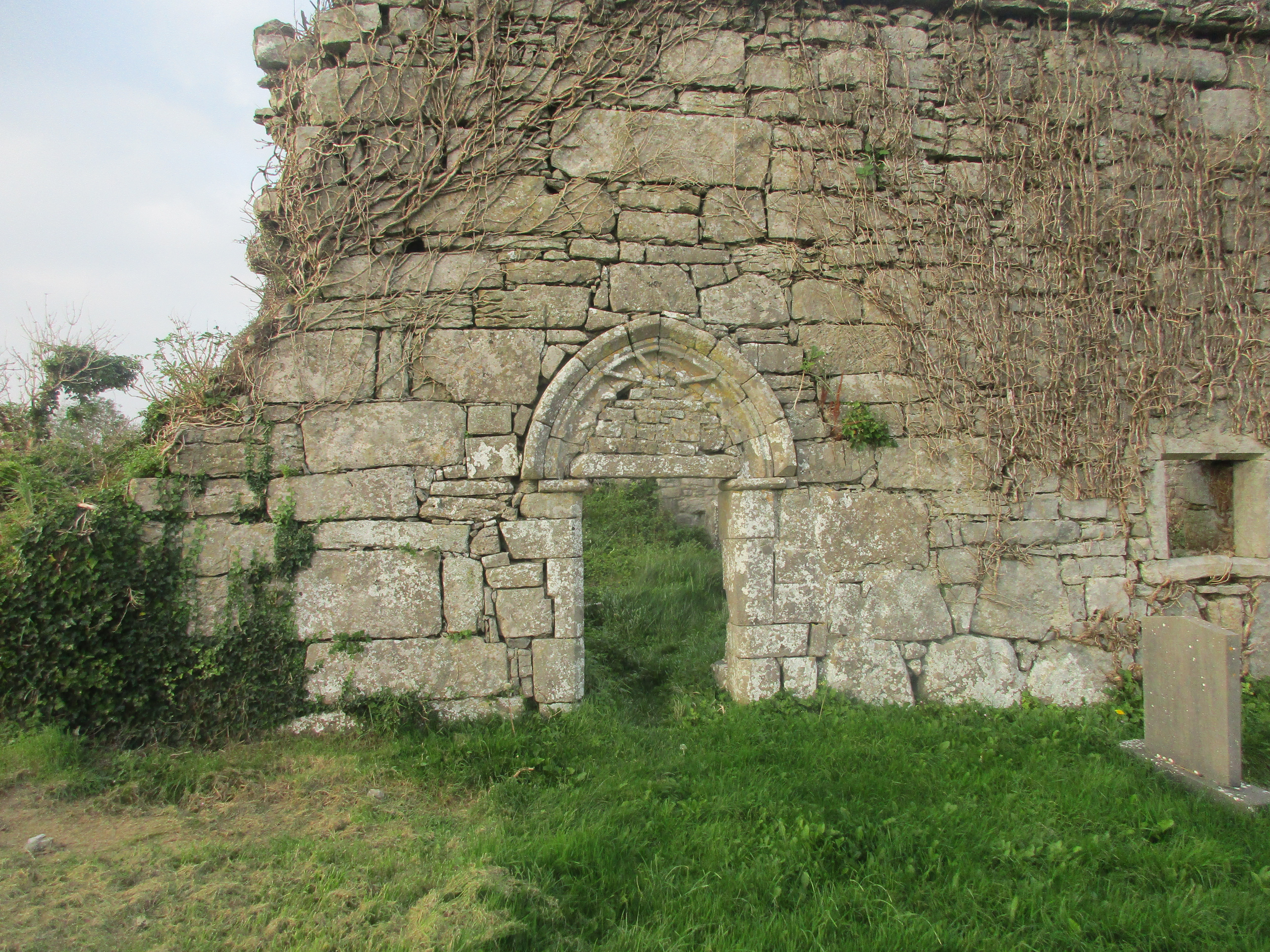
Noughaval medieval church, entrance

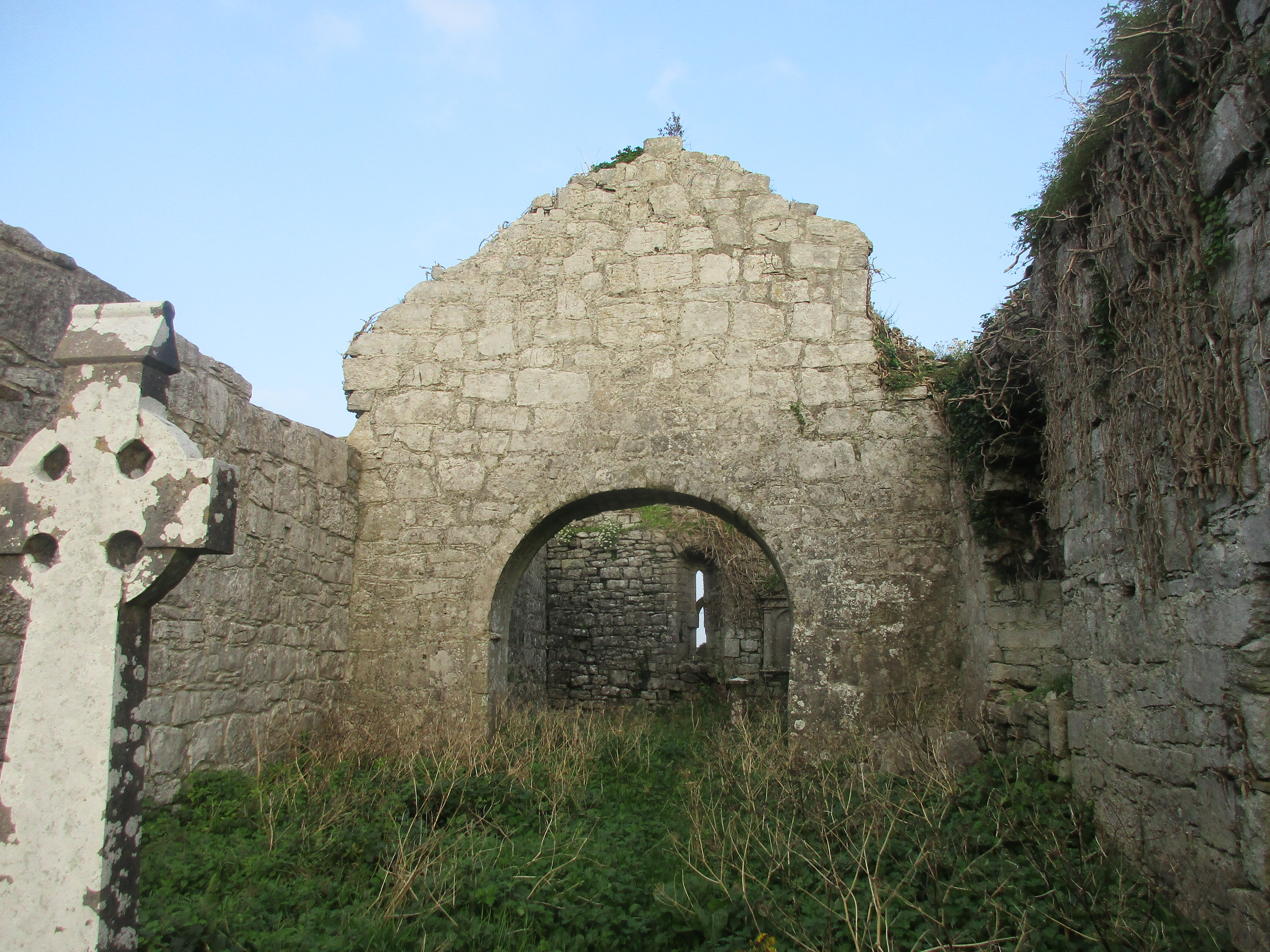
Noughaval medieval church

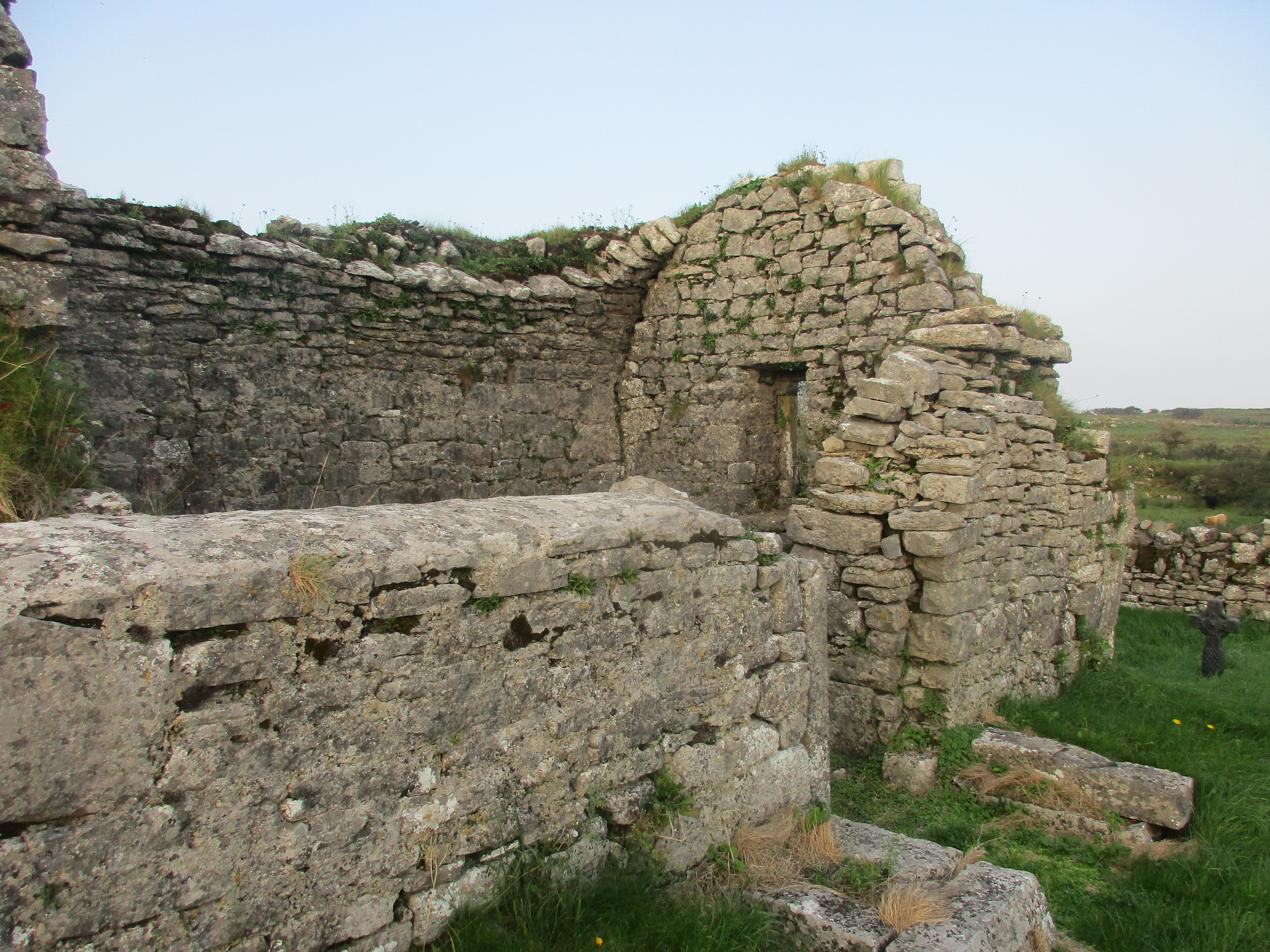
Memorial Chapel Davoren Family

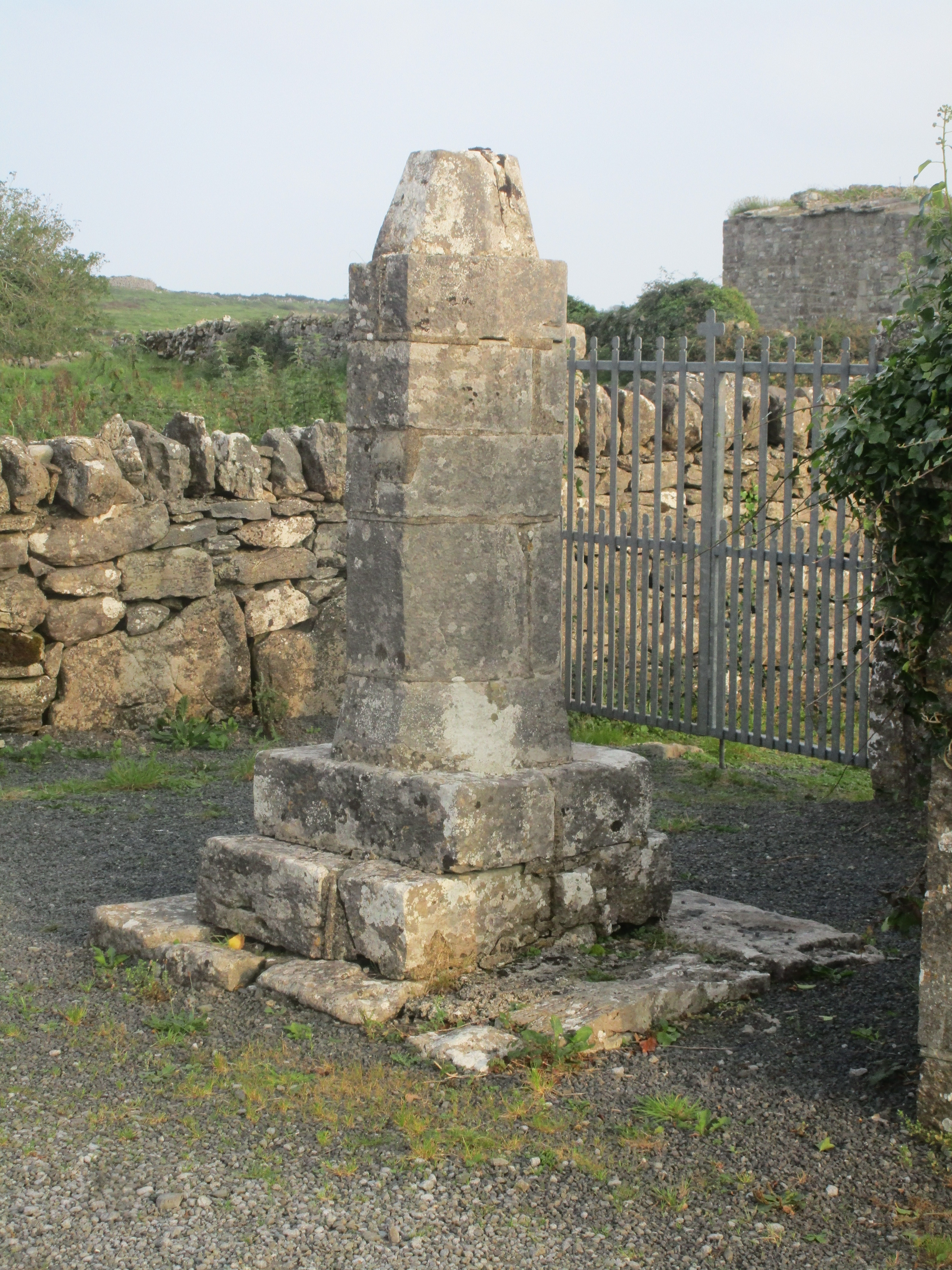
Market stone Noughaval.jpg

== See also ==
- Carron/New Quay, the present Catholic parish of which Noughaval is a part.
