= Killonaghan =

Civil parish in County Clare, Ireland

Killonaghan Cill Onchan
- Civil parish
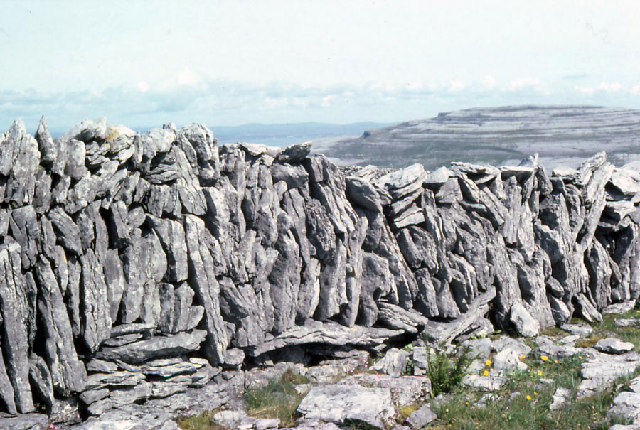
- Stone wall on the green road between Formoyle and Faunarooska, with Dobhach Bhrainin in the distance

- Location within Ireland
- Coordinates: 53°06′07″N 9°17′49″W
- Country: Ireland
- Province: Munster
- County: County Clare, County Limerick
- Time zone: UTC+0 (WET)
  - Summer (DST): UTC-1 (IST (WEST))

Killonaghan or Killonahan (Irish: Cill Onchan) is a civil parish in County Clare, Ireland. It covers a part of the Burren, a rugged area on the Atlantic coast, and contains the seaside village of Fanore.

== Location ==
The parish is on the west coast of the barony of Burren. It is 9 miles (14 km) northwest of Ennistymon. The parish is 4 by 2.75 miles (6.44 by 4.43 km) and covers 7,350 acres (2,970 ha). The land is mountainous and rocky, as is typical of the Burren, and mostly not suitable for farming. It rises from the sea shore to 1,134 feet (346 m) on Slieve-Elva, on the east boundary. The Caher river, which flows through the parish, enters the sea near Fanore. The river valley exhibits typical Burren scenery and flora.

== Antiquities and History ==
The parish name of Cill Onchan (Church of Onchu) refers to the patron Saint Onchum son of Blathmac, who was venerated at Rathblacmac in Inchiquin. His festival was on 9 July and 14 July each year. The church of Killonaghan was in good preservation in 1897. There is the ruin of an older church in the townland of Crumlin whose style of construction indicates that it is one of the early Christian churches. Traditionally is said to have been built by Saint Columbkill after he left Saint Endeus at Aran. There are many cahers, or stone ringforts, in the parish. There is the ruin of a round castle in the townland of Faunarooska. It is not included in the 1580 list of castles of Thomond.

The population in 1841 was 1,369 in 235 houses. The Catholic chapel was united with the Rathborney chapel. In 1847 John McNamara, who owned most of the land at Fanore and was considered a good landlord, applied for government funds to build a National School there. This was not approved. A schoolhouse was finally opened at Fanore in 1887, a single room, with two teachers. A lady taught the younger children up to the age of ten, then the master continued until school leaving at age fourteen. The classroom was cold in the winter, despite having a large fireplace at one end. The children had to take turns to bring cartloads of turf as fuel.

Saint Patrick's Church was built in 1870 at the entrance to the Caher river valley. The present school at Fanore was built in 1963. Fanore today is a small seaside village in the parish, with a long beach and a wide area of sand dunes. The village today has a shop, a bar/restaurant and a post office.

== Townlands ==
Townlands are Balliny North, Balliny South, Ballyelly, Blakes Mountain, Coolmeen, Craggagh, Crumlin, Derreen East, Derreen South, Derreen West, Fanore Beg, Fanore More, Faunarooska, Formoyle East, Formoyle West, Knockauns Mountain and Liscoonera.

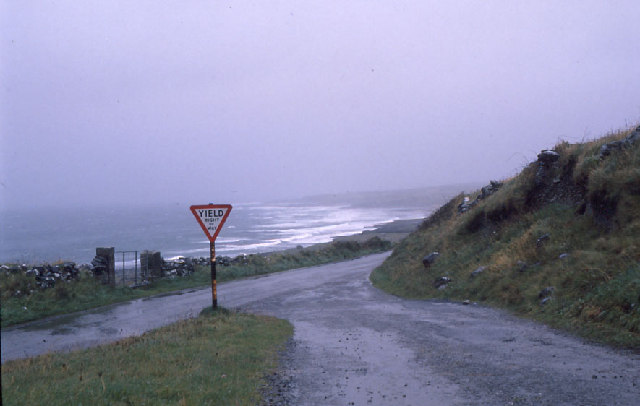
Coast road south of Fanore on a winter day

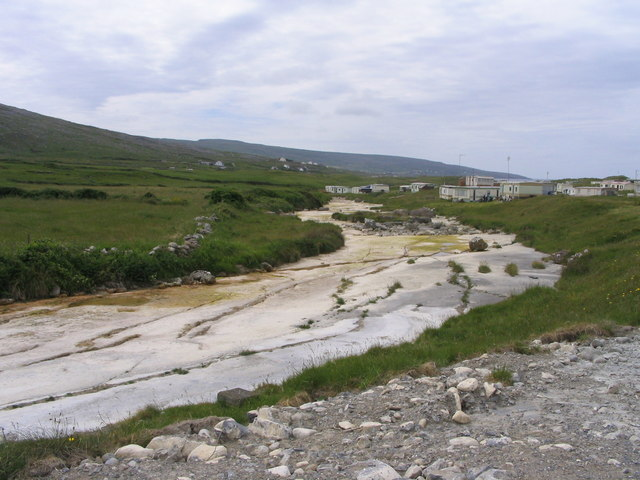
Caher river before Fanore beach

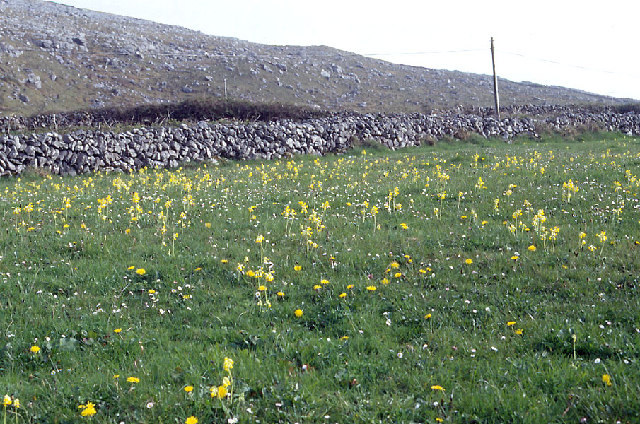
Cowslips in a field near Fanore
