= Aughinish Tower =

Martello tower in County Clare, Ireland

Aughinish Martello Tower
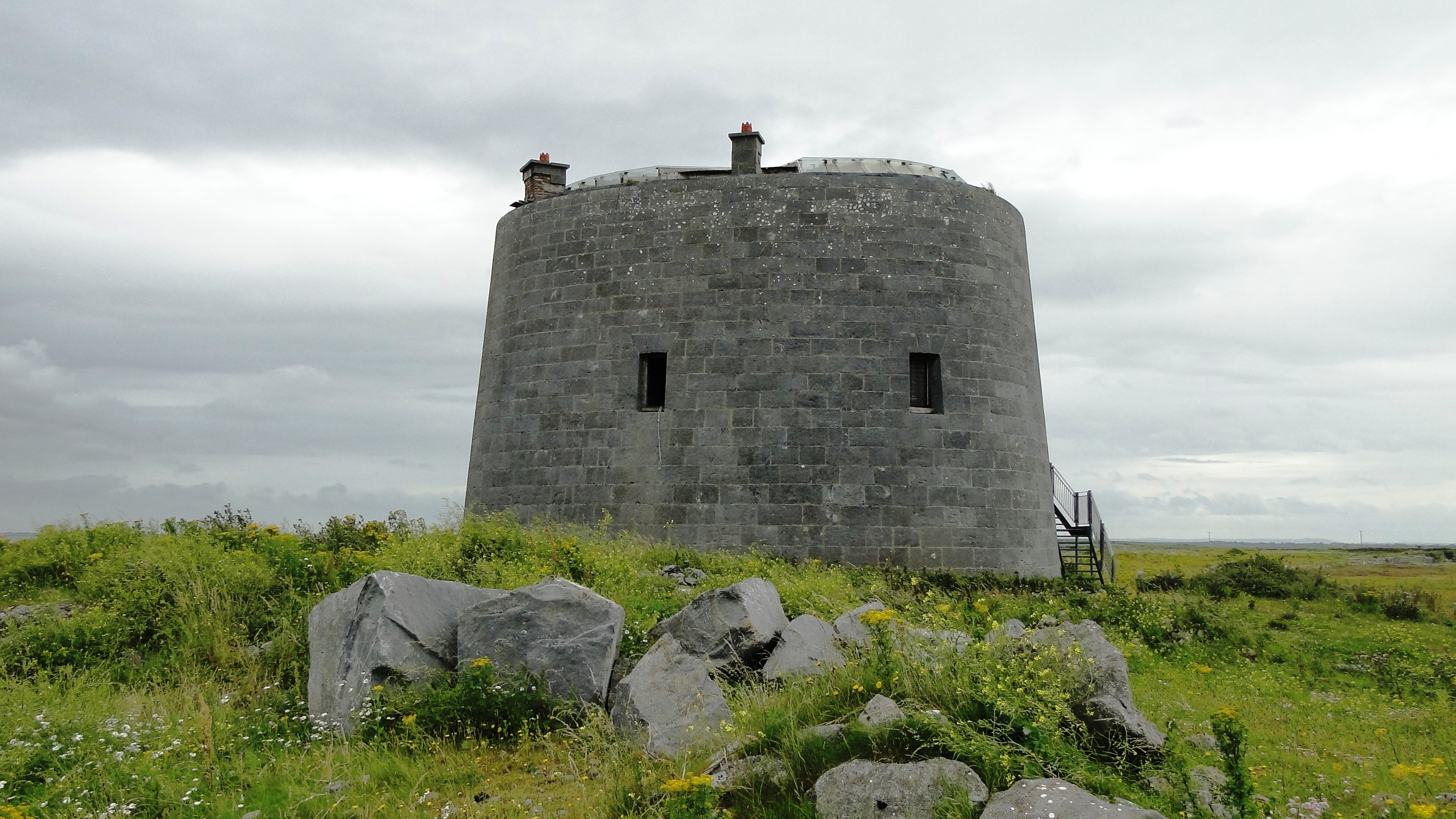
- Aughinish Tower

- Location within Ireland

General information
- Status: Inhabited
- Type: Martello tower
- Location: Aughinish, County Clare, Ireland
- Coordinates: 53°10′6.63″N 9°4′0.43″W
- Construction started: c. 1812
- Completed: c. 1816

Aughinish Tower is a Martello tower at Aughinish, County Clare, Ireland. It was built as a signal and gun tower to defend Ireland against invasion by the French during the Napoleonic Wars.

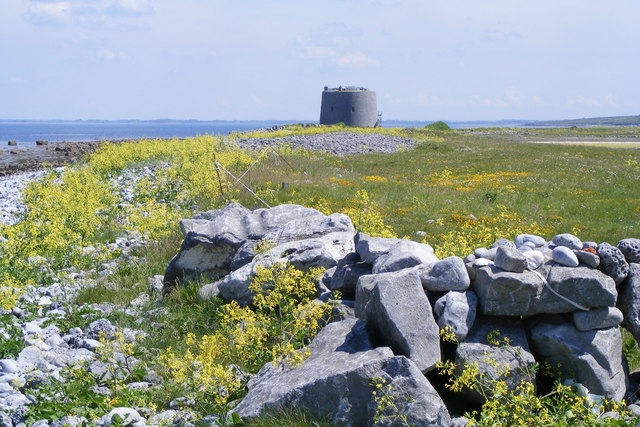
Location of the Martello Tower near the shoreline of Aughinish

== History ==
The tower's construction dates back to March 1811 when 6 acres (2.4 ha) of land for the site was purchased from a Major Lynch. While the Aughinish Tower is the same design as the Finavarra Tower, its small ordnance storage building no longer exists. This structure was previously recorded as being located just west of the tower. The tower itself had accommodation for one officer and thirty-nine men on the first floor. It also contained a basement water tank, a magazine, cellar and store at ground level. An original twenty four pound cannon was still in place until 1992.

In the 1950s, townspeople from Aughinish used the tower for dancing and Ceilidh. The parties were held on special occasions such as Christmas, Easter, and for local weddings. People from New Quay often rowed across the inlet to attend the gatherings.

In 1960, a man named Duffy from Limerick purchased the tower from the Land Commission and sold the property in 1987 for an undisclosed amount of money. The current owner is from Galway and he has refurbished the tower as a residence. A steel stairway has been erected and secured to the outside of the tower.
