= New Quay, County Clare =

Village in County Clare, Ireland

Coordinates: 53°09′21″N 9°04′45″W

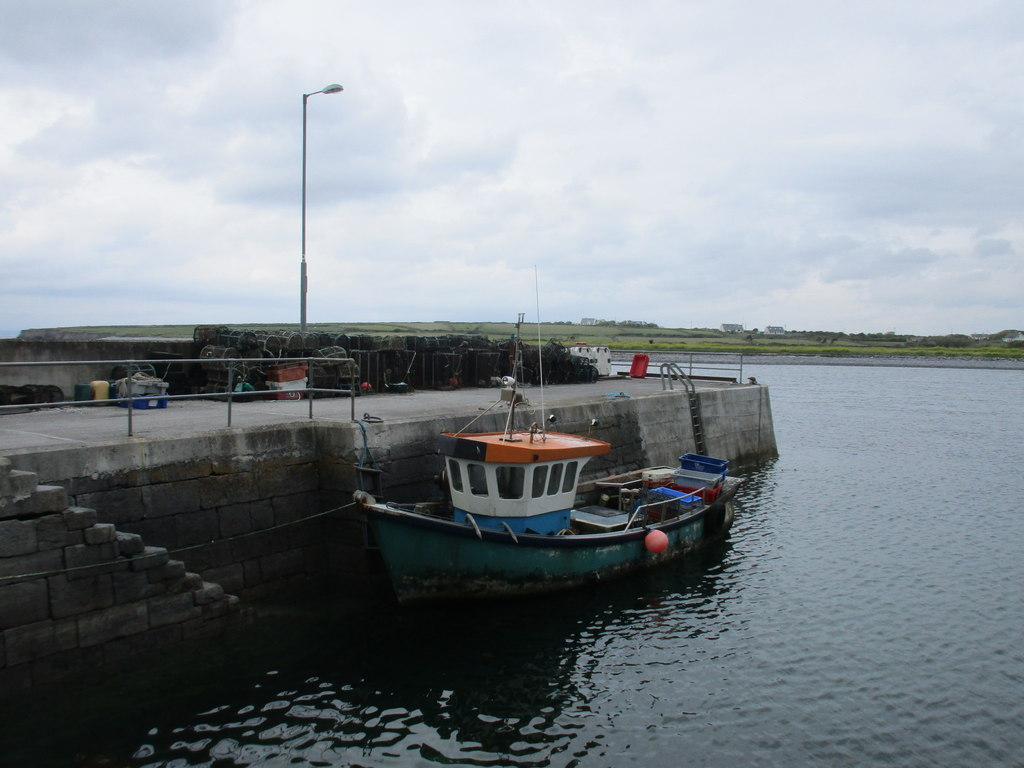
Boat at New Quay (2015)

New Quay or Newquay (Irish: An Chéibh Nua) is a small coastal settlement in County Clare, Ireland. It takes its name from the quay built at this point on Galway Bay in the 19th century. New Quay is in the civil parish of Abbey and the historical barony of Burren. It is within the ecclesiastical parish of Carron & New Quay in the Roman Catholic Diocese of Galway, Kilmacduagh and Kilfenora. The former holiday home of Lady Gregory, Mount Vernon Lodge, is located in a neighbouring townland, also called New Quay. In the ITA Topographical and General Survey, published by the Irish Tourist Association in 1942, New Quay is described as "scarcely [..] a village as the houses are very scattered. However there is a Guards station, a P.O., and two shops". A pub and restaurant on the quayside, Linnane's Bar, is located in the former post office building.
