= Abbey, County Clare =

Civil parish in County Clare, Ireland

Abbey An Mhainistir
- Civil parish
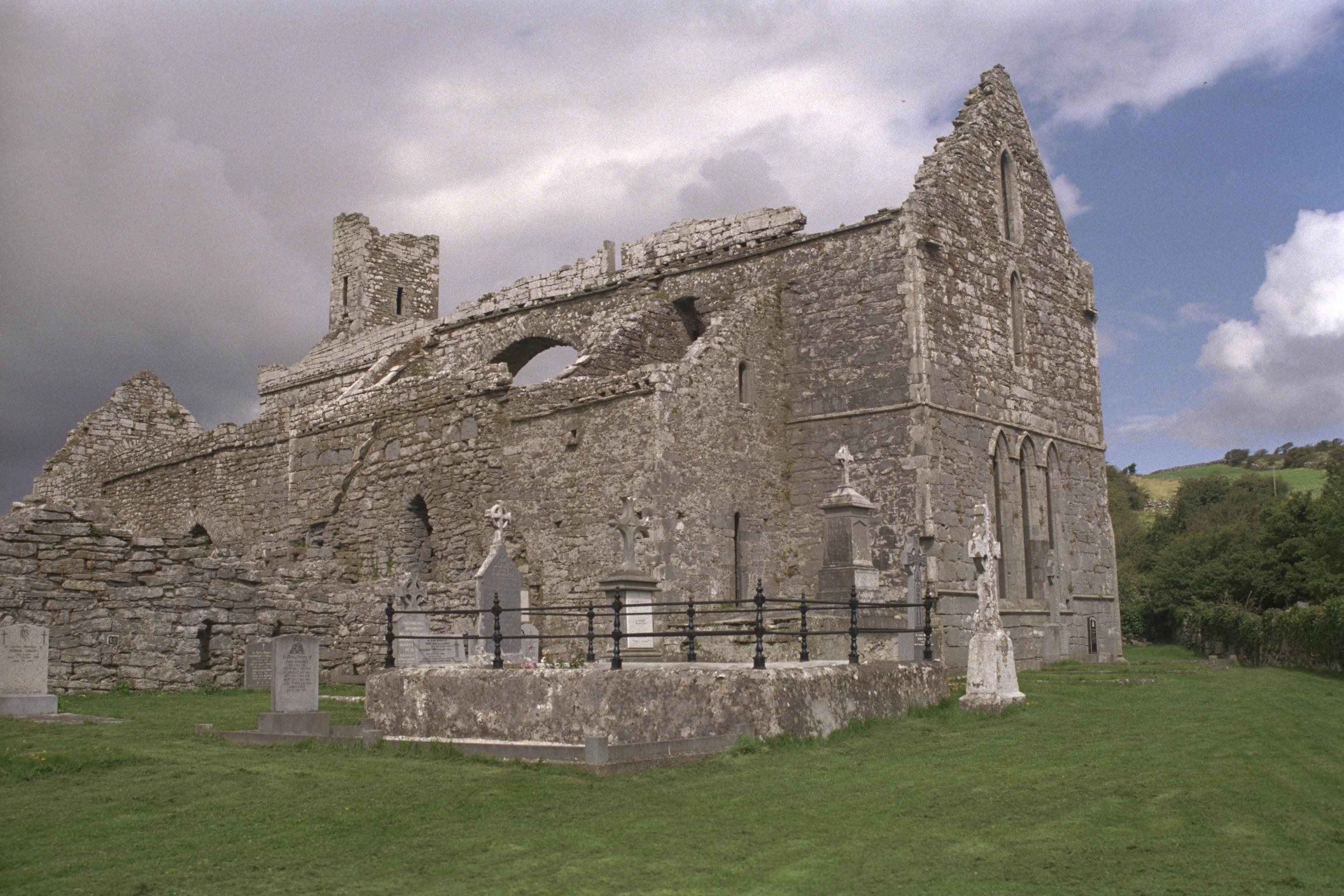
- Corcomroe Abbey in 1996

- Location within Ireland
- Coordinates: 53.120148°N 9.065272°W
- Country: Ireland
- County: Clare

Abbey (Irish: An Mhainistir) is a civil parish in the Barony of Burren in County Clare, Ireland.

== Origins ==
The parish is named for the Cistercian Corcomroe Abbey, or the Abbey of Burren, dedicated to the Virgin Mary. The full name of the parish in Irish is Mainistir Chocro Mhodhruadh which means the Abbey of Corcomroe, an ancient túath covering the northwest of County Clare, and which later comprised the baronies of Corcomroe in the southwest and Burren in the northeast. This monastery was founded either in 1194 by Donald O’Brien, King of Thomond, or in 1200 by his son, Donogh Cairbreac. The abbey later became subject to Furness Abbey in Lancashire.

== Townlands ==
The parish includes the townlands of Abbey (East), Abbey (West), Aillwee, Ballyhehan, Ballyvelaghan, Cartron, Corranroo, Dooneen. Moneen, Mortyclogh, Munnia, Rossalia and Sheshia.
