= Burren College of Art =

Art school in Ballyvaughan, Ireland, with gallery

Location
- The Burren; Ballyvaughan, County Clare; Ireland; 53.103861°N 9.169228°W

Information
- Type: non-profit
- Established: 1993
- Founder: Michael Greene
- President: Mary Hawkes-Greene
- Dean: Conor McGrady
- Campus: Rural
- Website: http://www.burrencollege.ie

Burren College of Art is a nonprofit independent art college specialising in undergraduate and graduate Fine Art education in Ballyvaughan, County Clare, Ireland. The Master of Fine Art programme is accredited by the University of Galway. The college has a substantial gallery space.

== About ==
The Burren College of Art was founded by Michael Greene and his wife, Mary Hawkes Greene, in 1993. They renovated a Norman tower house, called Newtown Castle, and its grounds. Buildings were added over time, including a new graduate studio and the largest gallery space in County Clare.

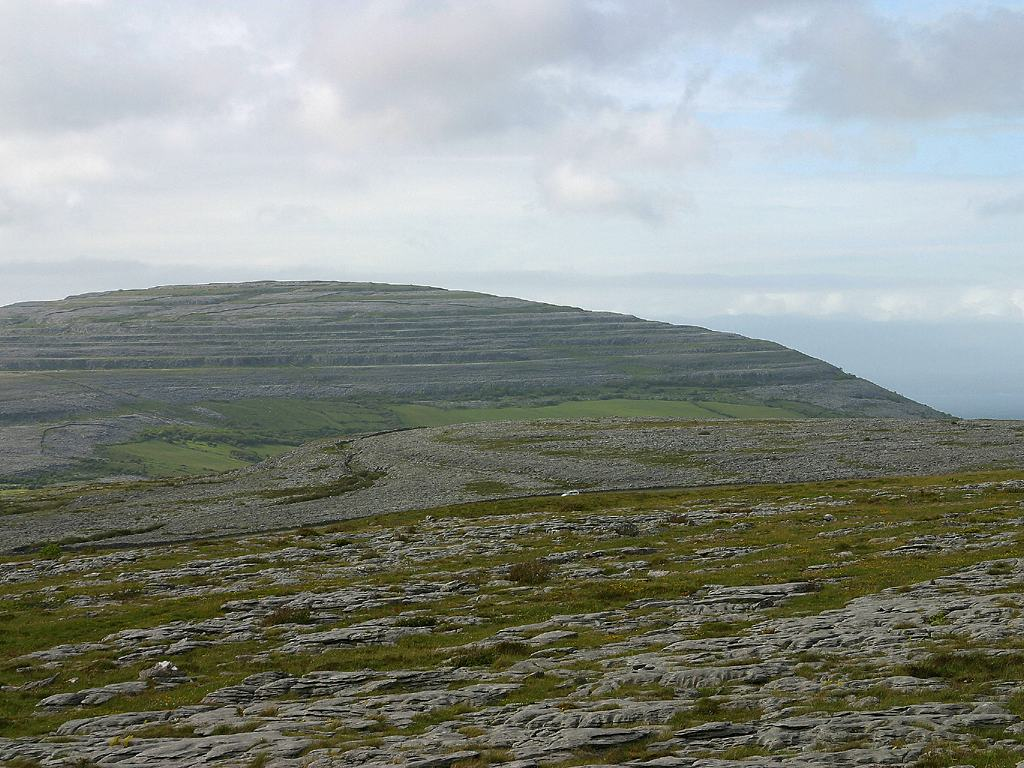
The Burren region of Ireland where the college is located.

The Burren College of Art is a unique experiment in art education, based in a unique rural landscape. —Eimear McKeith, Circa Magazine

The college hosted summer classes and study abroad students from the US. It started the first Masters of Fine Art in Ireland in 2003 and the first studio-based PhD in 2007, both conferred by the National University of Ireland, Galway. In 2007 Circa Art Magazine called the college a "high-standard, third-level art education cheek by jowl with Clare’s grykes and clints".

The college has a students' union (Burren College of Art Students' Union - BCASU), which advocates for student welfare and represents the student voice in meetings with academic leadership. The union is also a member organisation of Aontas na Mac Léinn in Éirinn, the national students' union of Ireland.

== Academic partners ==
- University of Galway
- Royal College of Art, London
- The School of the Art Institute of Chicago
- The University of Colorado Denver
- The Minneapolis College of Art and Design

== Memberships and affiliations ==
- Association of Independent Colleges of Art and Design
- College Art Association
- European League of Institutes of the Arts
- NAFSA: Association of International Educators
- National Association of Schools of Art and Design
