= Finavarra Tower =

Finavarra Martello Tower
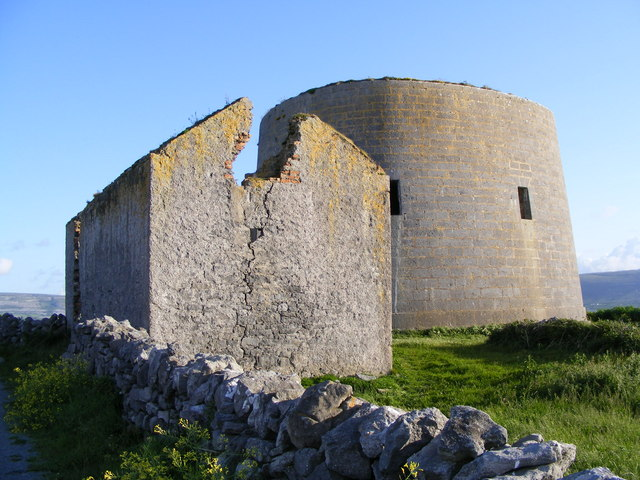
- Finvarra Tower and barracks

- Location within Ireland

General information
- Status: In ruins
- Type: Martello tower and barracks
- Location: New Quay, County Clare, Ireland
- Coordinates: 53°8′58.8″N 9°8′7.76″W
- Construction started: 1812
- Completed: 1816

Finavarra Tower is a Martello tower in Finavarra, County Clare, Ireland. Built during the Napoleonic Wars in 1812-16, and situated on Finavarra Point, the tower protected the north-eastern side of Ballyvaughan Bay and the south-western entrance of New Quay harbour from possible attack from France.

British military engineers built many such fortifications as signal towers to protect the coast against a French invasion. Most of these towers are oval or round and stand between forty and sixty feet high. Their staircases were incorporated within the walls and the doorway was usually some distance above ground level. This ovoid tower had three gun placements on the roof. The usual garrison of these towers was about ten men who would have lived in a nearby barracks. The remains of such a barracks lie north-east of the tower. However, nearby Aughinish Tower which is thought to have been of similar and contemporaneous construction, included quarters for around 40 men.

At the site of Finavarra Tower, a small stone has the following: "This property including the Martello Tower and Appurtenances was bequeathed to the State for the benefit of the Nation by MRS. MAUREEN EMERSON who died on the 4th day of November 1999."
