= John O'Donohue =

Irish poet, author, priest, and philosopher

- Born: 1 January 1956; West Ireland
- Died: 4 January 2008 (aged 52); Avignon, France
- Resting place: Creggagh Cemetery, Fanore, County Clare, Ireland
- Education: St Patrick's College, Maynooth; University of Tübingen
- Occupations: poet, author, priest, philosopher
- Notable work: Anam Cara (1997)

John O'Donohue (1 January 1956 – 4 January 2008) was an Irish poet, author, priest, and Hegelian philosopher. He was a native Irish speaker, and as an author is best known for popularising Celtic spirituality.

== Early life and education ==
Eldest of four siblings, O'Donohue was reared in west Ireland in the area of Connemara and County Clare, where his father Patrick O'Donohue was a stonemason, while his mother Josie O'Donohue was a housewife.

O'Donohue became a novice at Maynooth, in north County Kildare, at age of 18, where he earned degrees in English, philosophy, and theology at St Patrick's College in County Kildare. He was ordained as a Catholic priest on 6 June 1979. O'Donohue moved to Tübingen, Germany in 1986, and completed his dissertation in 1990 on German philosopher Georg Wilhelm Friedrich Hegel for his PhD in philosophical theology from University of Tübingen. In 1990, he returned to Ireland to continue his priestly duties, and began his post-doctoral work on the 13th-century mystic, Meister Eckhart.

== Career ==
O'Donohue's first published work of prose, Anam cara (1997), catapulted him into a more public life as an author, speaker and teacher, particularly in the United States.

O'Donohue left the priesthood in 2000.

In 2021, John Barry was inspired by O'Donohue's book Eternal Echoes (1998) to compose an album with the same name - Eternal Echoes.

O'Donohue also devoted his energies to environmental activism, and is credited with helping spearhead the Burren Action Group, which opposed government development plans and ultimately preserved the area of Mullaghmore and the Burren, a karst landscape in County Clare.

Later in life, O’Donohue became a prominent speaker on creativity in the workplace. He consulted executives in the corporate sector "on integrating a sense of soul and of beauty into their leadership and their imagination about the people with whom they work."

Just two days after his 52nd birthday and two months after the publication of his final complete work, Benedictus: A Book of Blessings, O'Donohue died suddenly in his sleep on 4 January 2008 while on holiday near Avignon, France. The exact cause of death has not been released by his family, leaving writers of non-fiction to speculation regarding the cause. Articles and posts have listed an aneurysm, heart problem, and aspiration as possible causes. He was survived by his partner Kristine Fleck, his mother Josephine (Josie) O'Donohue, his brothers, Patrick (Pat) and Peter (PJ) O'Donohue, and his sister, Mary O'Donohue.

Posthumous publications include a reprinting of The Four Elements, a book of essays, in 2010 and Echoes of Memory (2011), an early work of poetry originally collected in 1994. In March 2015, a series of radio conversations he had recorded with close friend and former RTÉ broadcaster John Quinn was collated and published as Walking on the Pastures of Wonder.

== Litigation regarding his will ==
O'Donohue's last will was held to be invalid by the High Court in December 2011, Justice Gilligan holding that "As a piece of English, the Will is unclear on its face" and that the will was void for uncertainty. The will did not leave anything to his partner Kristine Fleck. In the absence of a valid will his estate devolved on his mother, Josie O'Donohue.

== Quotations ==
- "When you cease to fear your solitude, a new creativity awakens in you. Your forgotten or neglected wealth begins to reveal itself. You come home to yourself and learn to rest within. Thoughts are our inner senses. Infused with silence and solitude, they bring out the mystery of inner landscape."

- Anam Cara, p. 17

- "Part of understanding the notion of Justice is to recognize the disproportions among which we live...it takes an awful lot of living with the powerless to really understand what it is like to be powerless, to have your voice, thoughts, ideas and concerns count for very little. We, who have been given much, whose voices can be heard, have a great duty and responsibility to make our voices heard with absolute integrity for those who are powerless."
- "Music is what language would love to be if it could."

== Works ==
- Anam Cara (1996)
- Eternal Echoes (1998)
- Conamara Blues: Poems (2000)
- Divine Beauty: The Invisible Embrace (2003)

Published in the US as Beauty: The Invisible Embrace (2003)

- Benedictus: A Book of Blessings (2007)

Published in the US as To Bless the Space Between Us (2008)

- The Four Elements: Reflections on Nature (2010)
- Echoes of Memory (1994; reprinted 1997 and 2011)
- Walking on the Pastures of Wonder (2015)

Published in the US as Walking in Wonder (2018)
