= Emer Colleran =

Irish microbiologist

- Born: 12 October 1945; Ballinrobe, Ireland
- Died: 30 June 2018 (aged 72); Galway, Ireland
- Occupations: Microbiologist, academic

Academic background
- Education: National University of Ireland, Galway

Emer Colleran (12 October 1945 – 30 June 2018) was an Irish microbiologist, academic and an environmental advocate. She was professor of microbiology at the National University of Ireland, Galway, a member of the Royal Irish Academy, one of Mary Robinson's nominees on the Council of State, and chairwoman of An Taisce - the National Trust for Ireland.

== Birth and education ==
Colleran, and her twin Noreen, were born in Ballinrobe, Co Mayo in October 1945 to John and Josie Colleran. One of a family of five children, her father was a school principal and her mother, also a primary school teacher, died when she was just 11 years old. She completed her secondary education at St Louis secondary school in Kiltimagh. She spent a lot of time outdoors as a child, particularly fishing, which sparked her interest in the environment.

On entering higher education, she had a grant from the Department of Education, which required that she had to do her studies through the Irish language. Her first choice, Medicine, was not available through Irish so she chose Science. She graduated with a first class primary degree in Science at University College Galway (now National University of Ireland, Galway) in 1967.

She specialised in anaerobic digestion as a postgraduate and in 1971 became a postdoctoral fellow for two years at the University of Bristol in the UK.

== Academic career ==
Colleran lectured in biology at Athlone Regional Technical College (later AIT) and Galway Regional Technical College (later GMIT) before her appointment as a lecturer in microbiology at NUIG in 1976. She was appointed Associate Professor of microbiology by the Senate of the National University of Ireland in 1990.

She was a member of the university's governing authority for a number of years, but stepped down in May 2000 in connection with the selection procedure for the new university president. In October that year she was appointed professor of microbiology and chair of the department at NUIG.

She was the first director of the Environment Change Institute at NUI Galway set up under the Higher Education Authority's Programme for Research in Third Level Institutions in 2000. In 2010, the Environmental Change Institute and the Martin Ryan Marine Research Institute were merged to form the current day Ryan Institute at the National University of Ireland Galway.

== Environmentalist ==
In 1973 Colleran was elected to the committee of the Galway Association of An Taisce, part of a national voluntary organisation the aims of which were to conservation in Ireland through education, publicity and positive action. She served as membership secretary and then treasurer to the Galway branch before becoming chairman. In 1981, as chairman of the Galway branch, she hit back at claims from Galway County Council that An Taisce were an anonymous group, wielding power unfairly. She was involved in the compilation of a controversial planning report, published by An Taisce in 1983, which highlighted abuse of planning laws by city and county councillors across Ireland, and in particular in counties Galway, Mayo, Donegal, Kerry and Louth.

She served as Environmental Officer for An Taisce before being elected National Chairman in 1987, the first time a chairman had come from one of the western county associations. She continued to use her position to campaign against misuse of planning laws, for a clamp down on pollution of rivers and lakes, and against a move to scrap An Foras Forbartha, a body that provided independent monitoring of pollution. During her three years as chairman, until May 1990, she was particularly involved in debates over local environmental and planning issues, in particular over gold mining in the west of Ireland, a proposed airport for Clifden, and the planned sewage treatment plant at Mutton Island in Galway.

In 1991 plans were announced for a new visitor centre, to be located at Mullaghmore in The Burren. Colleran was among those who were part of an appeal, saying that while the plan for the national park was welcomed by An Taisce, they wanted the visitor centre to be located three or four miles from Mullaghmore.

== Appointments and honours ==
President Mary Robinson appointed seven new members to her Council of State in February 1991, including Colleran. Other new members appointed at the time were Monica Barnes, Patricia O'Donovan, Quintan Oliver, Rosemarie Smith, Dónal Toolan and D. Kenneth Whitaker. The new Council of State represented a wide spectrum of Irish life and was widely welcomed, although Fine Gael was disappointed that its leader John Bruton was not included.

In 1991, she was one of 15 people appointed to Taoiseach Charles Haughey's Green 2000 Advisory Group, to determine which problems would face the environment in the next century. The group was led by Dr David Cabot, special advisor on environmental affairs.

She was appointed a member of the National Heritage Council in 1995 by the then Minister for Arts, Culture and the Gaeltacht, Michael D. Higgins. In the same year the Minister of State at the Department of the Marine, Eamon Gilmore, appointed her to the chair of the Sea Trout working group to oversee the implementation of recommendations to tackle a decline in sea trout stocks, particularly in the west of Ireland.

In 2003 Colleran was elected as member of the Royal Irish Academy.

She was recognised at the annual NUI Galway Alumni Awards in 2004 when she received the award for Natural Science, sponsored by Seavite Bodycare Ltd., which acknowledges a graduate who has made an outstanding contribution in the field of natural science.

== Later life and death ==
Colleran died on 30 June 2018 at University Hospital Galway.
