= Slieve Rua =

Hill in County Clare, Ireland

Coordinates: 53.012°N 8.997°W

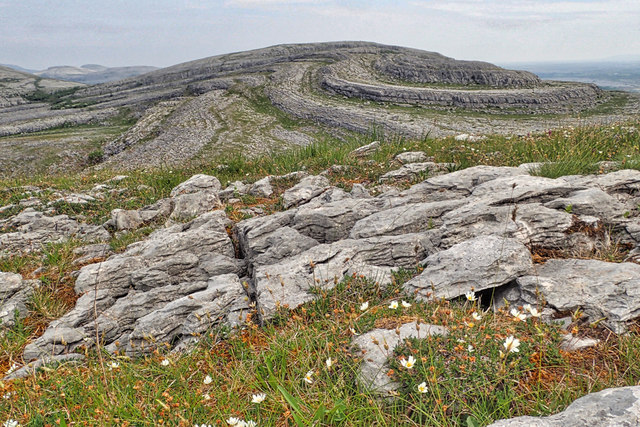
Sliabh Rua viewed from nearby Mullaghmore

Slieve Rua (Irish: Sliabh Rua) is a karst (limestone) hill in The Burren in County Clare, Ireland. The eccentrically shaped hill is located near Mullaghmore within Burren National Park.
