= Burren National Park =

National park in the west of Ireland

- Páirc Náisiúnta Bhoirne
- IUCN category II (national park)
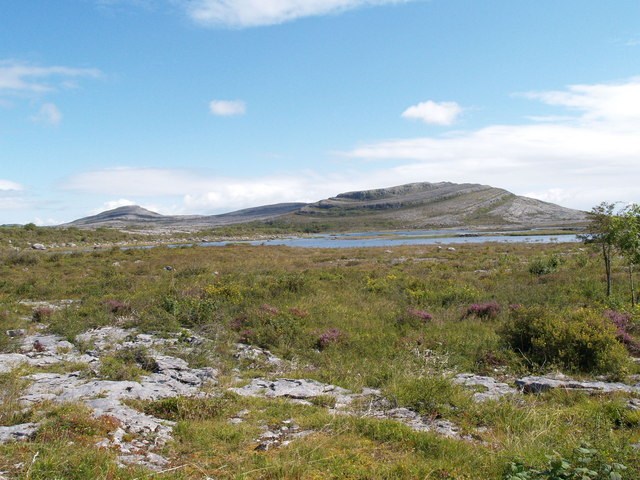
- Mullaghmore (right) and Sliabh Rua (left) within Burren
- Interactive map of Burren National Park
- Location: County Clare, Ireland
- Nearest town: Ennis
- Coordinates: 53.01°N 9.00°W
- Area: 15 km^{2} (5.8 sq mi)
- Established: 1991
- Governing body: National Parks and Wildlife Service (Ireland)

National Parks in Ireland

Burren National Park (Irish: Páirc Náisiúnta Bhoirne) is one of eight national parks in Ireland managed by the National Parks and Wildlife Service. It covers a small part of the Burren, a karst landscape in County Clare.

Burren National Park was founded and opened to the public in 1991. It features 1,500 hectares of mountains, bogs, heaths, grasslands and forests. The park is the smallest of Ireland's national parks.

== See also ==
- Burren and Cliffs of Moher Geopark
