= List of national parks of the Republic of Ireland =

National Parks in Ireland

This is a list of national parks of the Republic of Ireland.

The chart below shows the national parks of the Republic of Ireland. The first park established in Ireland was Killarney National Park located in County Kerry in 1932. Since then a further 7 national parks have been opened; the most recent being Páirc Náisiúnta na Mara in County Kerry, the first marine national park and the largest in the state National parks are managed by the National Parks and Wildlife Service.

| National Park | Photo | Region | Area (Land & Sea) | Established |
|---|---|---|---|---|
| Killarney; Cill Airne | | County Kerry | 105 km^{2} (41 sq mi) | 1932 |
| Connemara; Conamara | | County Galway | 20 km^{2} (7.7 sq mi) | 1980 |
| Glenveagh; Gleann Bheatha | | County Donegal | 170 km^{2} (66 sq mi) | 1984 |
| The Burren; Boirinn | | County Clare | 15 km^{2} (5.8 sq mi) | 1991 |
| Wicklow Mountains; Sléibhte Chill Mhantáin | | County Wicklow | 205 km^{2} (79 sq mi) | 1991 |
| Wild Nephin; Néifinn Fhiáin | | County Mayo | 150 km^{2} (58 sq mi) | 1998 |
| Boyne Valley (Brú na Bóinne) National Park; Brú na Bóinne | | County Meath | 2.2 km^{2} (0.85 sq mi) | 2023 |
| Páirc Náisiúnta na Mara | | County Kerry | 283.3 km^{2} (109.4 sq mi) | 2024 |

== See also ==
- Conservation in the Republic of Ireland
- National parks of Northern Ireland (none as of 2020)
- List of nature reserves in the Republic of Ireland
- List of Special Areas of Conservation in the Republic of Ireland
