= Burren Action Group =

Late 20th century campaign group in County Clare, Ireland

The Burren Action Group was a group of people from County Clare in Ireland who opposed plans during the 1990s by the Office of Public Works to develop a large scale interpretative centre at Mullaghmore in the local Burren area.

== Goal ==
The Group was a collective of concerned locals who saw themselves as fighting to maintain the natural integrity of the landscape and to protect the environment from elements of the Government of Ireland which did not understand what was at stake. They also felt that the Burren and the area of Mullaghmore formed a "sacred site" and holy ground that needed to be defended in a country whose sites of profound historical importance were rapidly disappearing.

== History ==
In 1992/1993 seven members of the group lodged a complaint against the project with the Irish High Court, which resulted in work being stopped. These seven included local farmers like James Howard and Patrick McCormack, priest Fr John O’Donohue, poet Brian Mooney and academic Emer Colleran, as well as media figures like the producer P.J. Curtis and Lelia Doolan. The Burren Action Group was also supported by leftist politicians like Brigid Makowski.

Following about ten years of opposition, the group was finally successful in March 2000. An Bord Pleanála confirmed the ruling by the Clare County Council to refuse planning permission for a scaled-down version of the original plans.

In 2012, James Howard and Patrick McCormack, the latter owner of the house that featured as the parochial house in the Father Ted TV show, once again opposed a new application to construct a car park at the site of the planned visitors' centre.

== Fundraising ==
The Burren Action Group compiled a music album in the early 1990s, entitled Music in the Stone to raise money to save Mullaghmore because "...the wheels of greed are rolling towards it"; contributing artists included Luka Bloom, Sharon Shannon and Loreena McKennitt.
