= Anam Cara =

Celtic "soul friend"

Anam Cara is a phrase that refers to the Celtic concept of the "soul friend" in religion and spirituality. The phrase is an anglicization of the Irish word anamchara, anam meaning "soul" and cara meaning "friend".

== History ==
The term was popularised by Irish author John O'Donohue in his 1997 book Anam Ċara: A Book of Celtic Wisdom about Celtic spirituality. In the Celtic tradition "soul friends" are considered an essential and integral part of spiritual development. The Martyrology of Óengus recounts an incident where Brigid of Kildare counselled a young cleric that "...anyone without a soul friend is like a body without a head." A similar concept is found in the Welsh periglour.

The Anam Cara involves a friendship that psychotherapist William P. Ryan describes as "compassionate presence". According to O'Donohue, the word anamchara originates in Irish monasticism, where it was applied to a monk's teacher, companion, or spiritual guide. However, Edward C. Sellner traces its origin to the early Desert Fathers and Desert Mothers: "This capacity for friendship and ability to read other people's hearts became the basis of the desert elders' effectiveness as spiritual guides." Their teachings were preserved and passed on by the Christian monk John Cassian, who explained that the soul friend could be clerical or lay, male or female.
