= Burren Way =

Walking trail in County Clare, Ireland

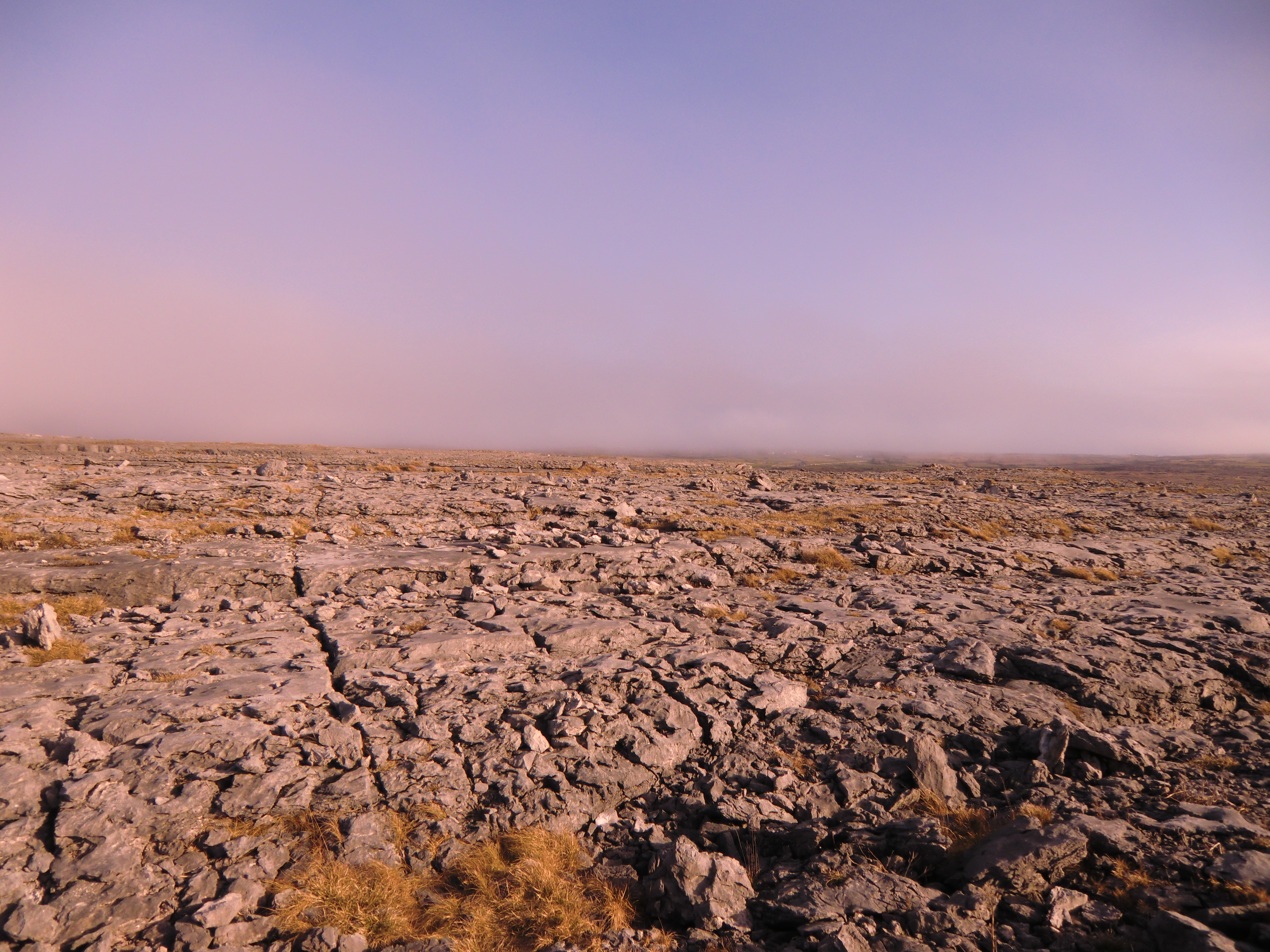
- The Burren
- Length: 114 kilometres (71 miles)
- Location: County Clare, Ireland
- Designation: National Waymarked Trail
- Trailheads: Lahinch, Corofin
- Use: Hiking
- Elevation change: 540 m (1,772 ft)
- Difficulty: Moderate
- Season: Any
- Sights: The Burren
- Surface: Tarmac roads, green roads, droving roads, paths and forestry tracks
- Website: http://burrenway.com/

The Burren Way (Irish: Slí Bhoirne) is a long-distance trail in County Clare, Ireland. It is 114 kilometres (71 miles) long, begins in Lahinch and ends in Corofin, crossing The Burren, one of the largest karst limestone landscapes in Europe.

The trail, typically completed in five days, comprises sections of tarmac road, boreen, droving road, path and forestry track. It is designated as a National Waymarked Trail by the National Trails Office of the Irish Sports Council and is managed by the Burren Way Committee.

== Route ==
The trail begins at the beach at Lahinch and follows minor roads to reach the Cliffs of Moher before continuing on roads to the village of Doolin. The route continues on roads to Lisdoonvarna. North of Lisdoonvarna, the Way joins a boreen between the townlands of Ballinalacken and Formoyle, crossing the plateau above the Caher Valley below Slieve Elva mountain. This section passes a number of places of historical interest, including Ballinalacken Castle, several ruined stone forts and Newtown Castle. The trail rejoins the road to reach Ballyvaughan. From Ballyvaughan, the route mostly follows roads to Corofin via Carran and Killinaboy.

The Burren Way originally followed a trail above the Cliffs of Moher from Hag's Head. Many walkers now start from Ballyvaughan to walk the boreen the Way follows in its northern sections and eschew the southern sections altogether. A review of the National Waymarked Trails in 2010 found low usage of the Burren Way by multiday walkers but high usage by day walkers on certain sections. The report found that route has good potential to be developed as a National Long Distance Trail, a new standard of trail in Ireland intended to meet international standards for outstanding trails, but significant work to achieve this is required. The report recommended that the proportion of road used by the trail be reduced as a matter of priority.
