= Páirc Náisiúnta na Mara =

National park in Ireland

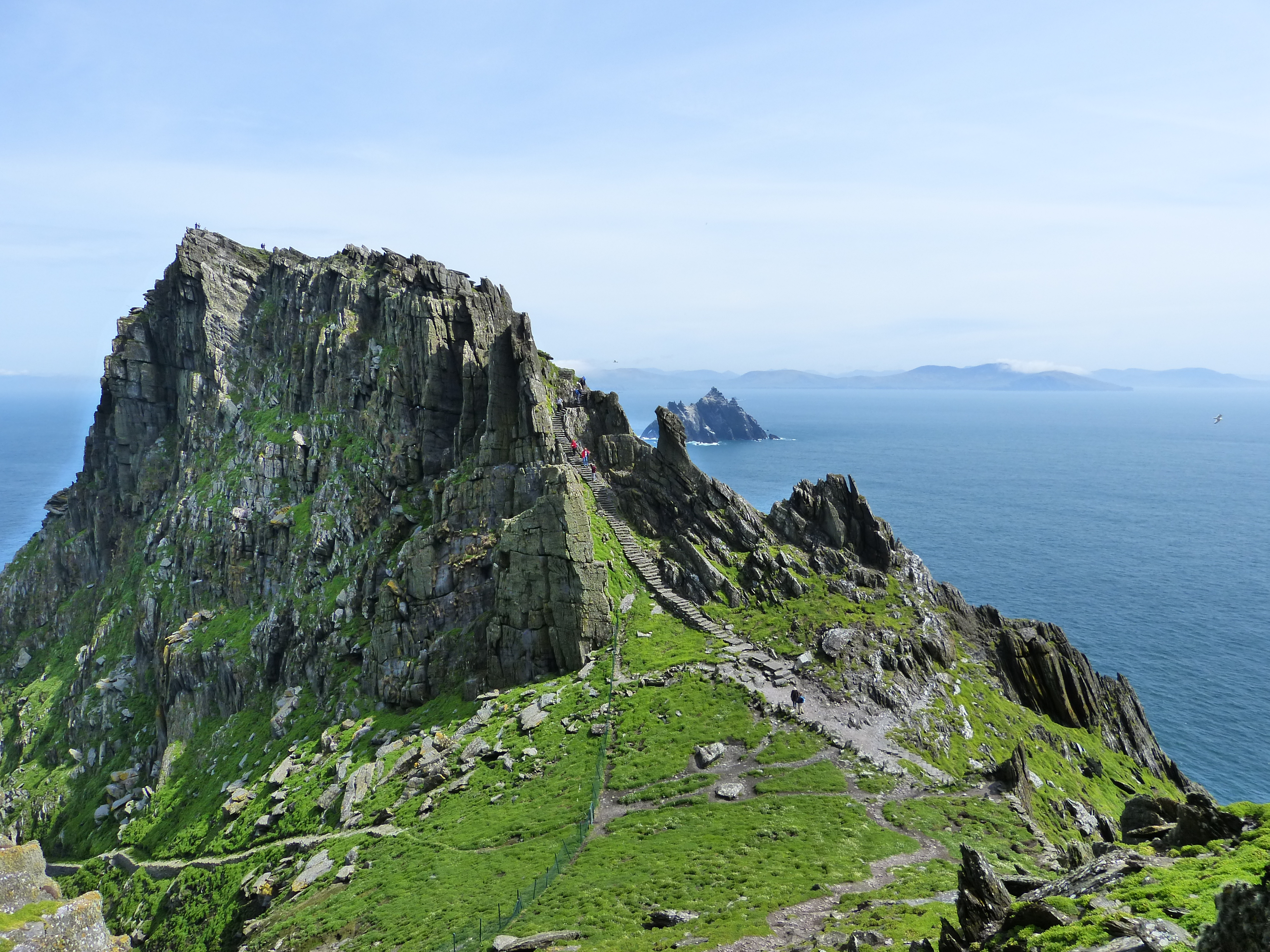
The Skellig Islands

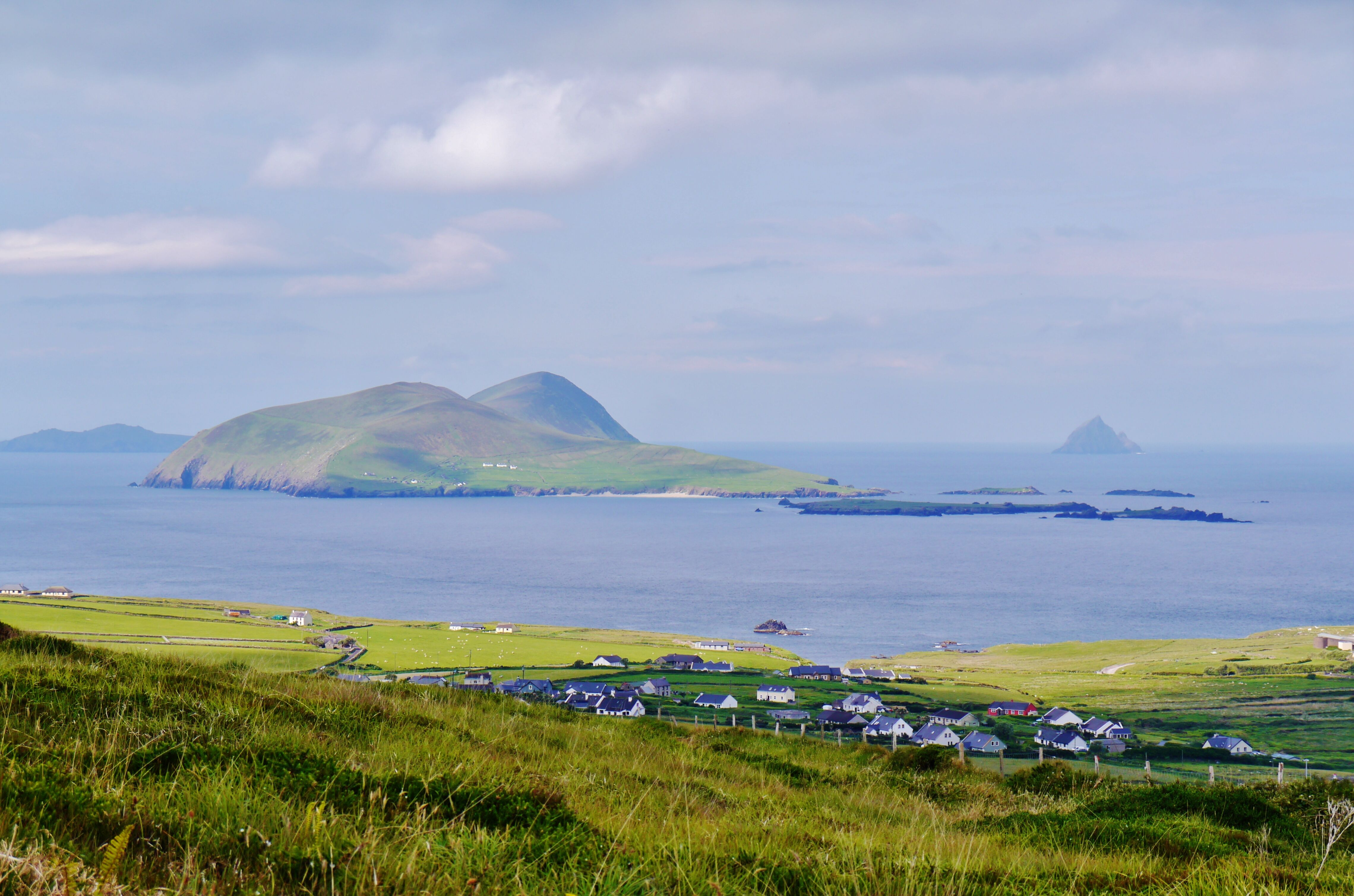
The Blasket Islands

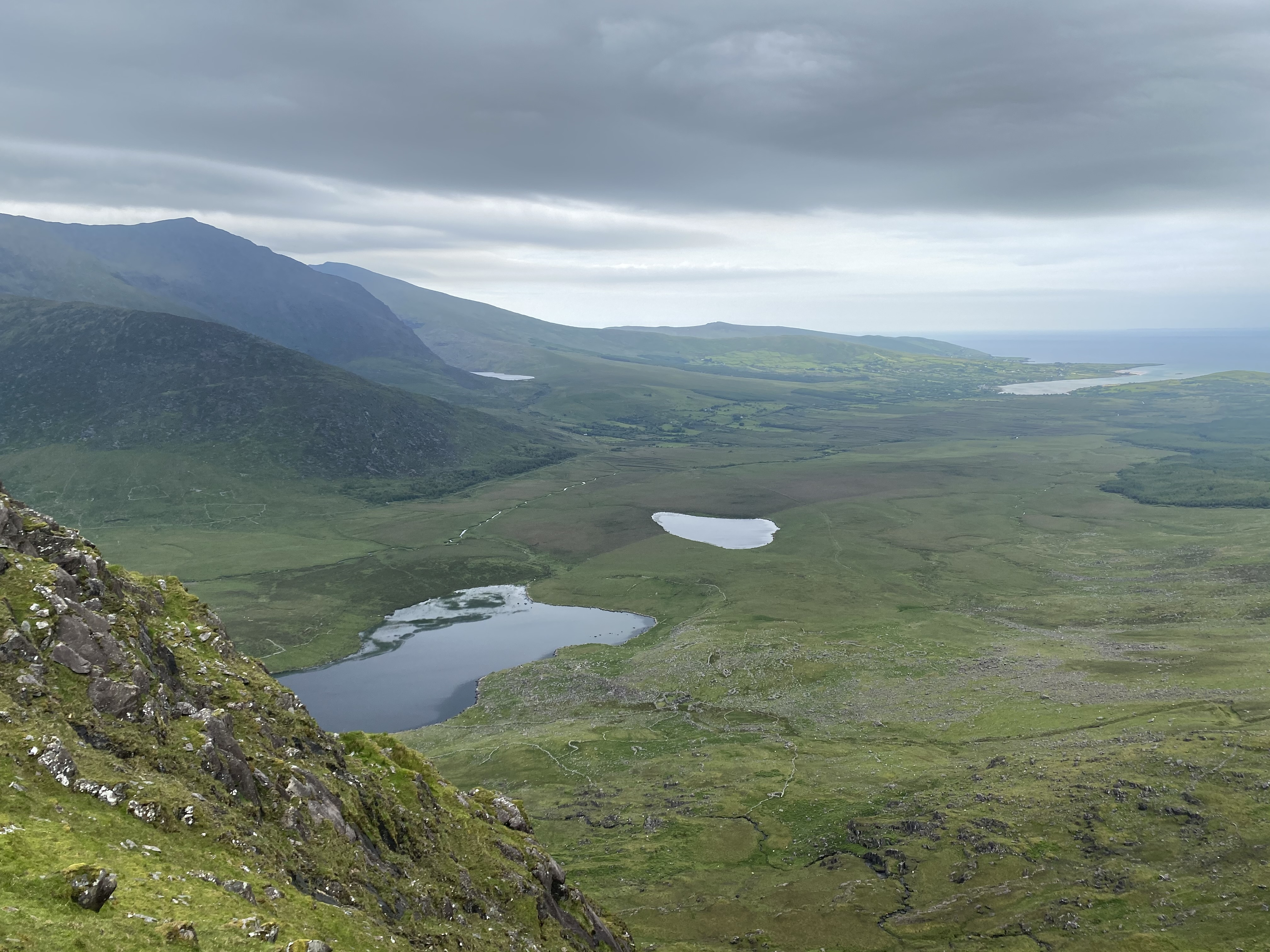
An Abha Mhór river valley

Páirc Náisiúnta na Mara, Ciarraí, also called the Kerry Seas National Park, is a national park being created on the coast of County Kerry, Ireland. The park was announced in April 2024. Primarily a marine park, it will cover 70,000 acres (280 km^{2}) of land and sea, making it Ireland's biggest national park. It includes the following areas:

- On and around the Dingle Peninsula:
  - Blasket Islands special area of conservation
  - An Abha Mhór river valley and the Conor Pass
  - Mount Brandon nature reserve, on the slopes of Más an Tiompáin
  - Inch dunes
  - Kerry Head shoals
- Off the Iveragh Peninsula:
  - Skellig Islands, including the World Heritage Site of Skellig Michael
  - Puffin Island
  - Derrynane Bay
  - Tetrapod trackway on Valentia Island
