= The Burren =

Glaciated karst landscape region in northwest County Clare, Ireland

- Boirinn
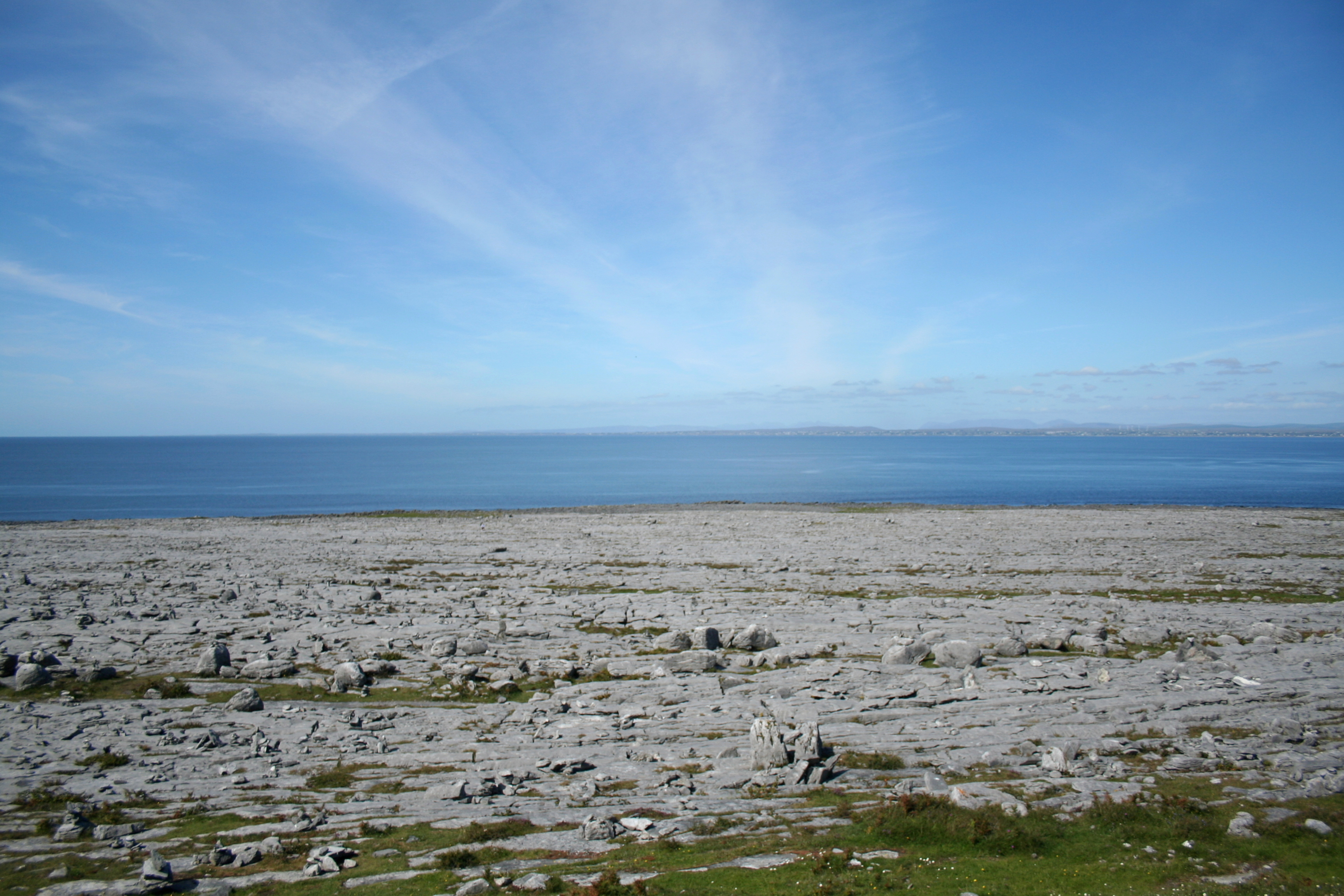
- The karst landscape of the Burren

- Location within Ireland
- Location: Northern Clare and southern Galway, Ireland
- Coordinates: 53°00′28″N 9°00′08″W
- Area: 130,966 acres (530.00 km^{2})
- Governing body: National Parks and Wildlife Service

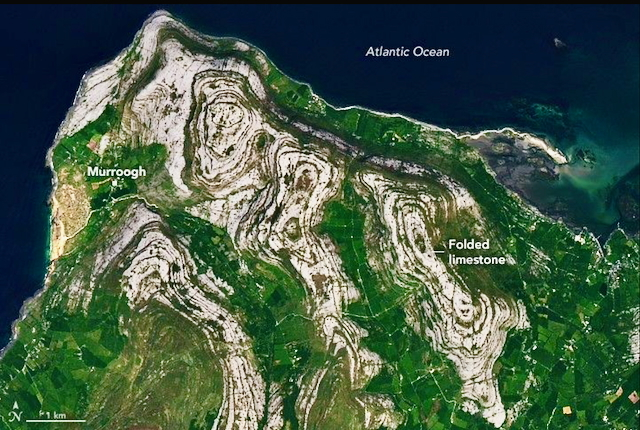
The Burren near Murroogh, County Clare, Ireland. Satphoto from Operational Land Imager on Landsat 8

The Burren (/ˈbʌrən/ BURR-ən; Irish: Boirinn, meaning 'rocky district') is a karst/glaciokarst landscape centred in County Clare, on the west coast of Ireland. It measures around 530 square kilometres (200 mi^{2}), within the circle made by the villages of Lisdoonvarna, Corofin, Gort and Kinvara. The area includes such natural features as Mullaghmore hill and Ailladie cliffs, and historic monuments such as Poulnabrone dolmen and Caherconnell Stone Fort. Burren National Park covers a small part of the Burren and is the smallest of Ireland's eight National Parks, while the adjacent territory, including the Cliffs of Moher, is included in the Burren and Cliffs of Moher Geopark.

== Location ==
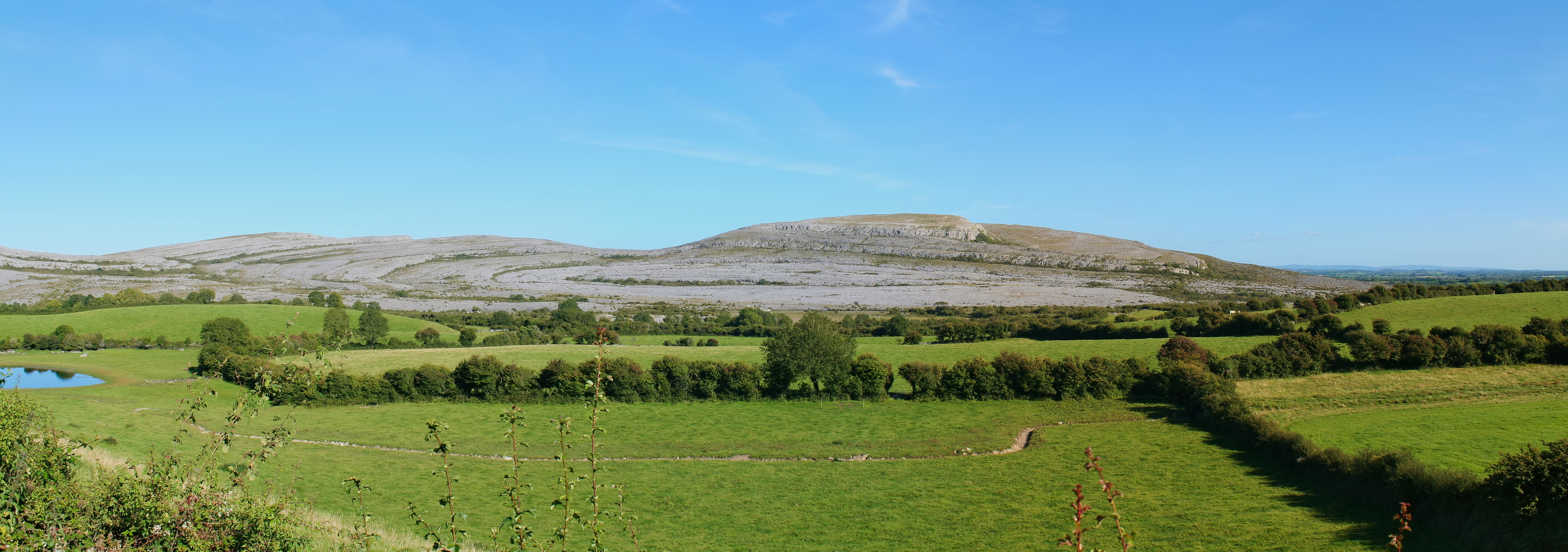
Stark contrast between The Burren and the surrounding landscape

While the name is generally applied to the limestone uplands of northwestern Clare and adjacent lowlands and generally excludes the area of Clare shales to the southwest, the area's exact extent is not clearly defined, and geologically it extends into County Galway to both the north and northeast (see Geology below). The southeastern pocket of County Galway around Kinvara is usually included and is the base of many Burren organisations. The Burren is bounded by the Atlantic Ocean and Galway Bay, with the Aran Islands representing a geological extension of the limestone hills that make up most of The Burren.

According to one definition, the Burren extends south to a line from the coastal resort of Lahinch to Corofin and is delimited in the east by a line roughly from Kinvara to Kilmacduagh monastery, near Gort. Taken literally, this includes places like the town of Ennistymon and the Cliffs of Moher, which are more commonly considered to neighbour the Burren. In another definition, the agriculture focused "Burren Programme" defines the region as extending well into the Gort plain, encompassing inter alia Coole Park and the turloughs around it, while to the south it extends to Ruan and Crusheen, and in the southwest to the edge of Doolin as well as the routine Lisdoonvarna, Kilfenora and Corofin.

Thus the size of the Burren varies between around 250 square kilometres (97 mi^{2}) (the core area of exposed limestone), through 360 square kilometres (140 mi^{2}) (taking in all limestone landscapes) and 560 square kilometers (including the about 200 square kilometres (77 mi^{2}) of downland), depending on the definition. Roughly 60% of the uplands show exposed limestone pavement.

== Climate ==
The Burren has a temperate oceanic climate. Average air temperatures range from 15 °C (59 °F) in July to 4–6 °C (39–43 °F) in January, while the soil temperature does not usually drop below 6 °C (as an exception, in late 2010, there was a prolonged period of snow). Since grass will grow once the temperature rises above 6 °C, this means that The Burren (like the neighbouring Aran Islands) has one of the longest growing seasons in Ireland or Britain, and supports diverse and rich plant growth.

The area has around 1,525 millimetres (60.0 in) of annual rainfall (more than twice the amount observed in eastern Ireland), with an average level of over 160 millimetres (6.3 in) monthly from October to January

Late May is a good time to view flowers, with the gentians and avens peaking (but orchid species blooming later).

During counter-guerrilla operations in The Burren in 1651–52, Edmund Ludlow stated, "(Burren) is a country where there is not enough water to drown a man, wood enough to hang one, nor earth enough to bury him...... and yet their cattle are very fat; for the grass growing in turfs of earth, of two or three foot square, that lie between the rocks, which are of limestone, is very sweet and nourishing."

== Geology ==
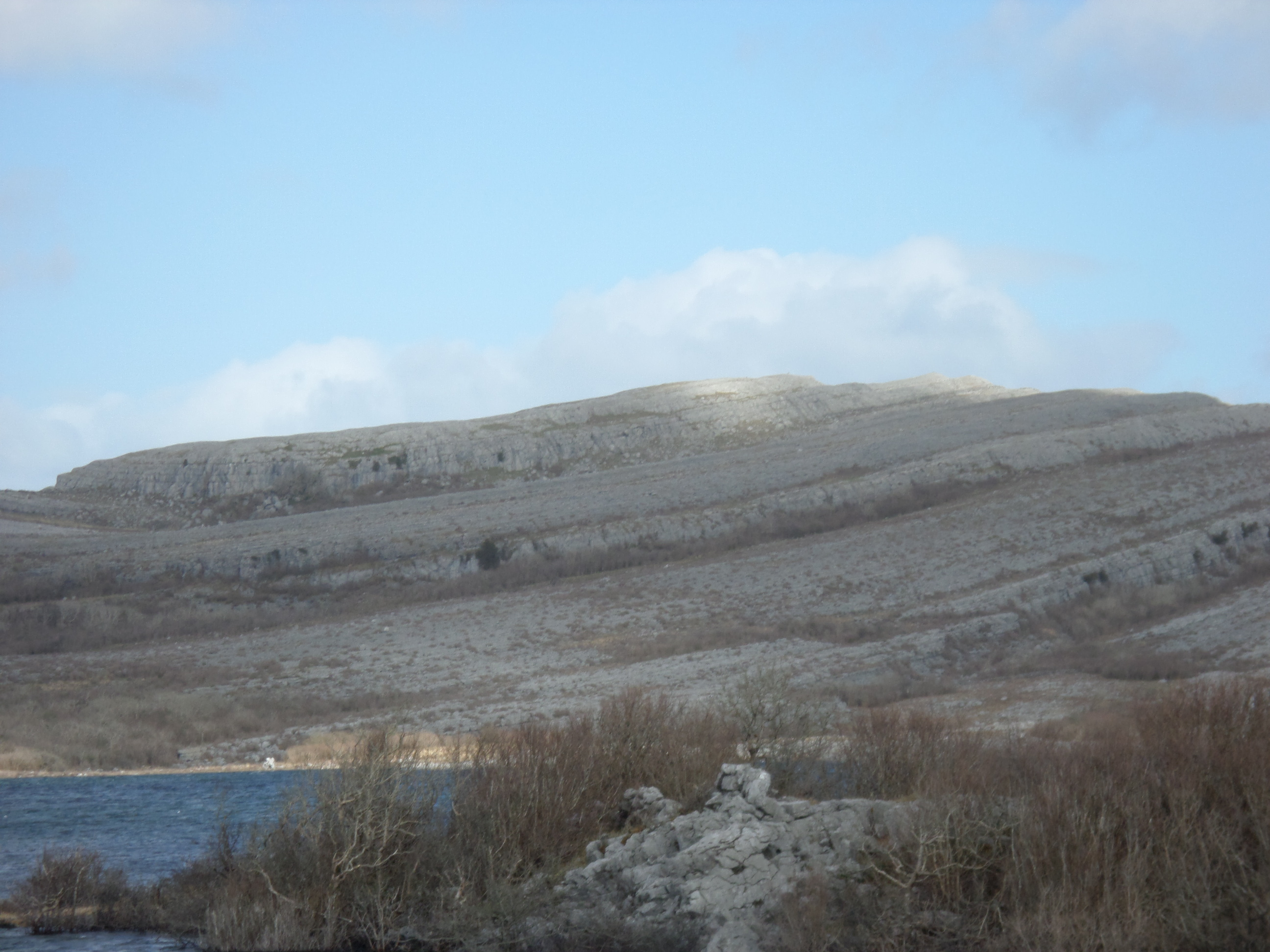
Mullaghmore Hill

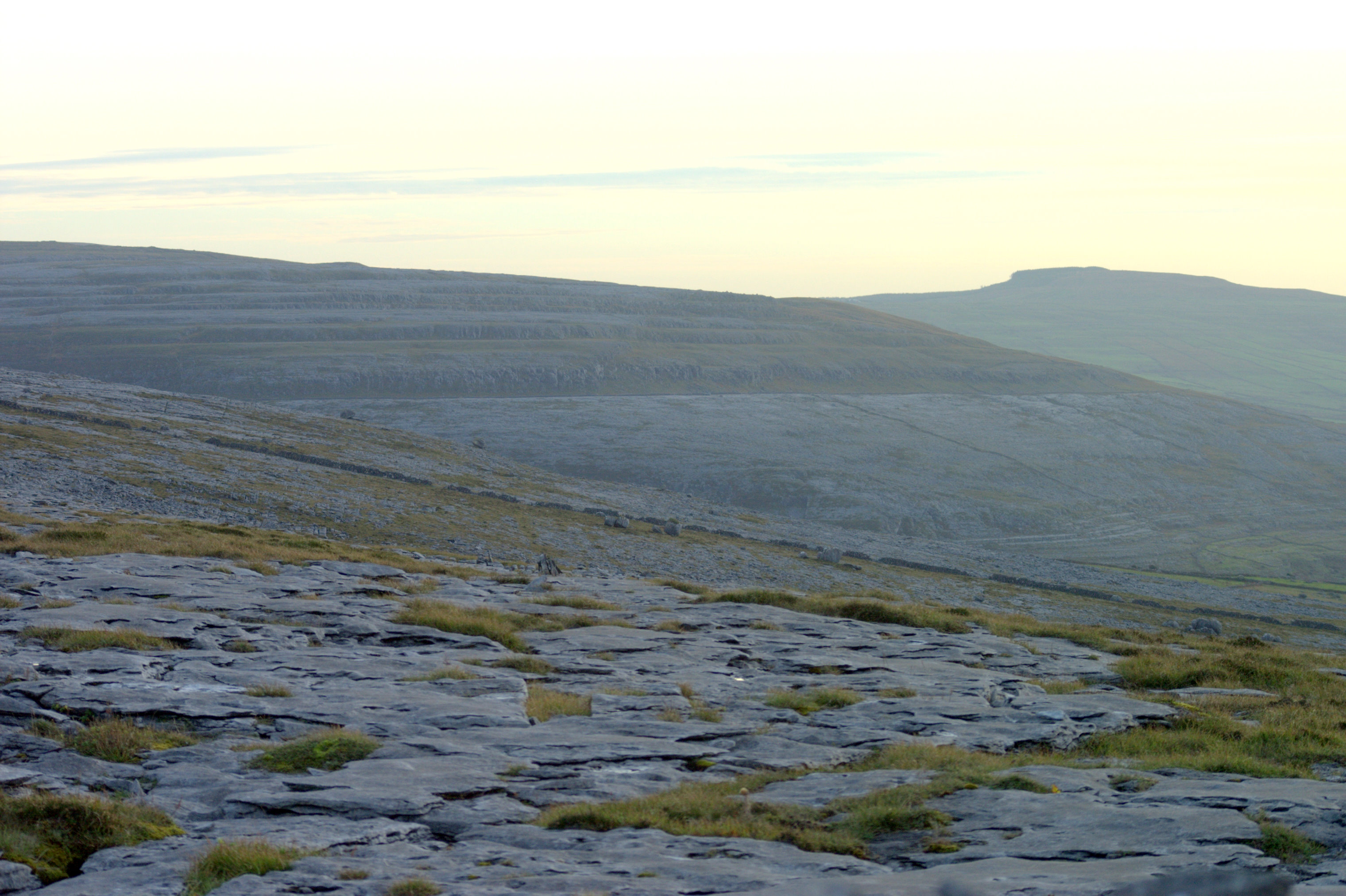
The karst hills of The Burren

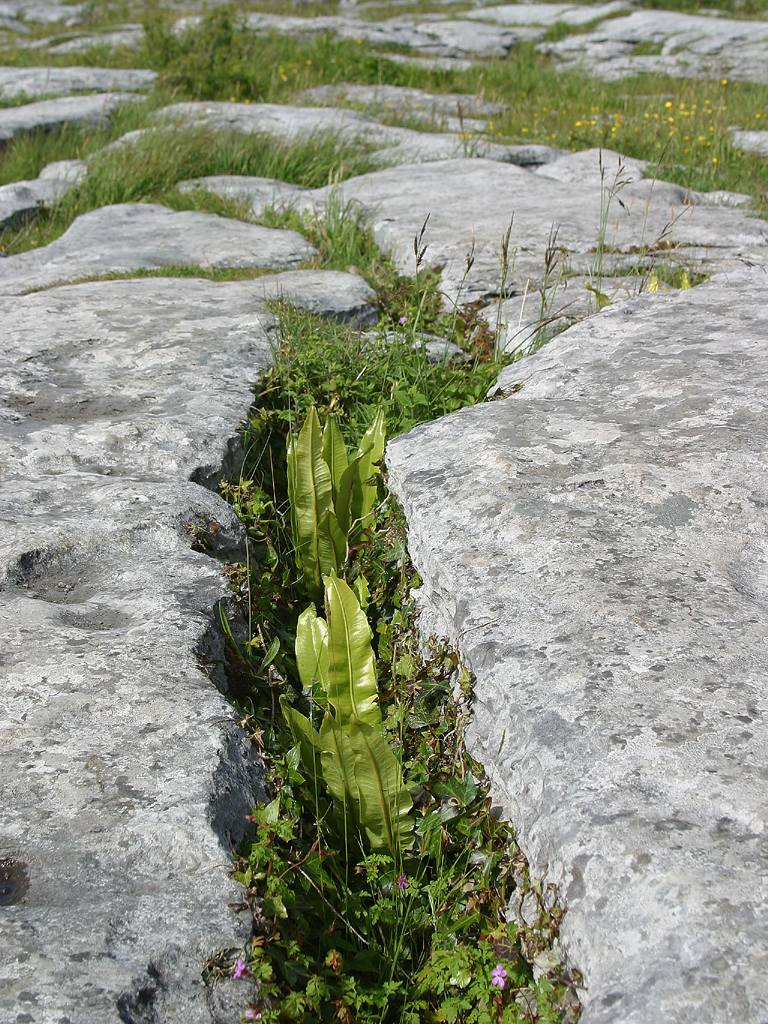
Grikes and clints run along the limestone pavement

=== Stratigraphy ===
The area is formed from a thick succession of sedimentary rocks, largely limestones but also including sandstones, mudstones and siltstones. All of the solid rocks exposed at the surface are of Carboniferous age though they are underlain at depth by Old Red Sandstone of Devonian age which in turn overlies rocks of Lower Palaeozoic age. None of the pre-Carboniferous rocks is seen at the surface in the area. The limestones, which date from the Visean stage of the early Carboniferous, formed as sediments in a tropical sea approximately 325 million years ago. The strata contain fossil corals, crinoids, sea urchins and ammonites. This bed of limestone is up to 800 metres thick. In the north and west it lies on a shelf of Galway granite which supported the upper layers, preventing shifts like those that created the "twisted" hills Knockanes and Mullaghmore. The limestone also extends below Galway Bay out to the Aran Islands and to the east into the Gort plain.

Later in the Carboniferous (c. 318 million years ago), the limestone was covered by darker sand and mud that later turned into shale (the lower "Clare Shales") and sandstone (the upper "Millstone Grit"). These layers reached a thickness of up to 330 metres (1,080 ft) in north Clare. These top layers protected the underlying limestone from erosion for millions of years before being largely stripped away by glaciers, except in the south west, where they still extend from Doolin to Slieve Elva, Lisdoonvarna, Kilfenora and to the western shore of Lake Inchiquin. One "island" of shale is the hill Poulacapple, southwest of Ballyvaughan, where an upland moor has formed on top of the impermeable shale layers.

The local geological succession comprises the following formations some of which are subdivided into various members. The youngest rocks are at the start of the list, the oldest at the bottom. The first three listed are of Namurian age and are a mix of mudstones, sandstones and siltstones, the remainder are Visean age limestones.

- Central Clare Group
- Gull Island Formation
- Clare Shale Formation
- Slievenaglasha Formation
  - Lissylisheen Member
  - Ballyelly Member
  - Fahee North Member
  - Balliny Member
- Burren Formation
  - Ailwee Member
  - Maumcaha Member
  - Hawkhill Member
  - Fanore Member
  - Black Head Member
- Tubber Formation
  - Finavarra Member
  - Castlequarter Member
  - Newtown Member
  - Fiddaun Member
  - Cregmahon Member

=== Quaternary ===
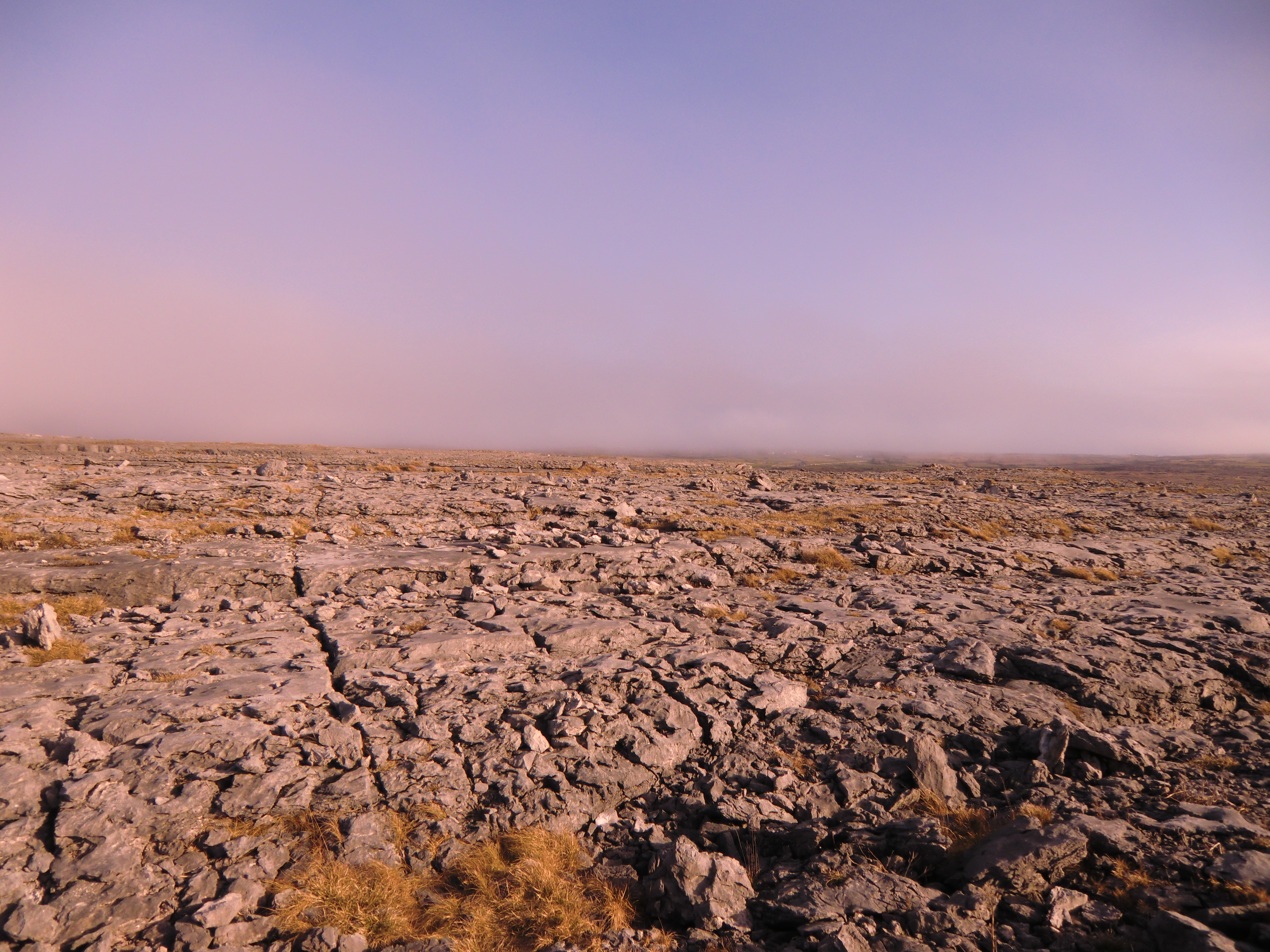
Karst landscape of the Burren

Glaciation during the late Quaternary period (beginning c. one million years ago) facilitated greater denudation. Glaciers expanded and retreated over the region several times. Of the last two periods the first was the more pronounced, covering the whole of the Burren. The last advance of the ice cover was more limited, affecting only the eastern Burren.

The result is that the Burren is one of the finest examples of glacio-karst landscape in the world. The effects of the last glacial period (the Midlandian) are most in evidence, with the Burren overrun by ice during this glaciation. The impact of earlier karstification (solutional erosion) has been eliminated by the last glacial period. So any surface karstification now seen dates from approximately 10,000 years ago and the Burren karst is thus very recent in geological terms.

Solutional processes have widened and deepened the grikes of the limestone pavement. Pre-existing lines of weakness in the rock (vertical joints) contribute to the formation of extensive fissures separated by clints (flat pavement like slabs). The rock karstification facilitates the formation of subterranean drainage. This has formed numerous cave systems of which more than 50 kilometres have been mapped. The most accessible of these is Aillwee Cave.

Due to the processes mentioned, there are very few permanent surface rivers in the region. The Caher, flowing into the sea at Fanore, is one of the most stable. Some of the large valleys, mostly running south to north, that are still visible today are in fact the remains of pre-glacial river valleys. The rivers disappeared from the surface when the upper layers of stone had been stripped away.

Another characteristic feature of the Burren is closed roughly circular depressions with no surface outlets for water (called poljes). Around 100 of these exist, mostly in the eastern Burren. The most notable are the valleys of Kilcorney, Poulawilan, Caherconnel and Carran, generally stretching from northeast to southwest. The largest is the Carran depression, more than two miles long, up to a mile wide and over 200 feet deep. This is where the pre-glacial rivers of the area first eroded away the upper layers and started to dissolve the exposed limestone. Some of the smaller ones were created when caves underneath collapsed (one example of this is the Glen of Clab).

Glaciers also deposited numerous granite and limestone erratics on the pavements. The former were carried south across Galway Bay by the second-to-last glaciation. Granite boulders can be found mostly in the north of the Burren. The final ice cover came from the northeast and mostly deposited limestone erratics. On Slieve Elva these are visible today at elevations of up to 300 metres (980 ft) above sea level. The characteristic terracing of the hills occurred when vertical joints weathered and large blocks of limestone fell off and were further eroded away.

Towards the very end of the Ice Age the glaciers ended for a time at Fanore. At that time, Slieve Elva and Knockauns hill alone rose above the surrounding ice fields. The valleys facing Galway Bay had been widened considerably by glacial action, first when the ice moved south from Connemara and then when meltwater sought a runoff. When the ice finally retreated it also left moraines in valley bottoms and the characteristic drumlins (most of them on top of the shale and sandstone to the south). The Caher Valley was almost choked up by deposited sand and rocks and these also piled up against the western slopes of Slieve Elva. It was this protective layer of sediment that has made surface streams locally possible once more.

Today, the uplands' highest point is on the hill Slieve Elva, whose shale cover rises to 345 metres (1,132 ft) above sea level.

== Landscape types and habitats ==
In addition to the limestone pavement, major landscape types, providing the habitats for the flora and fauna, include limestone heath, dry calcareous grasslands, calcareous (calcifying or petrifying) springs, the intermittent water bodies called turloughs, bogs, Cladium fens, lakes, wet grasslands, scrub and light woodland, and neutral, and farm-improved, grasslands.

== Flora, fauna and funga ==
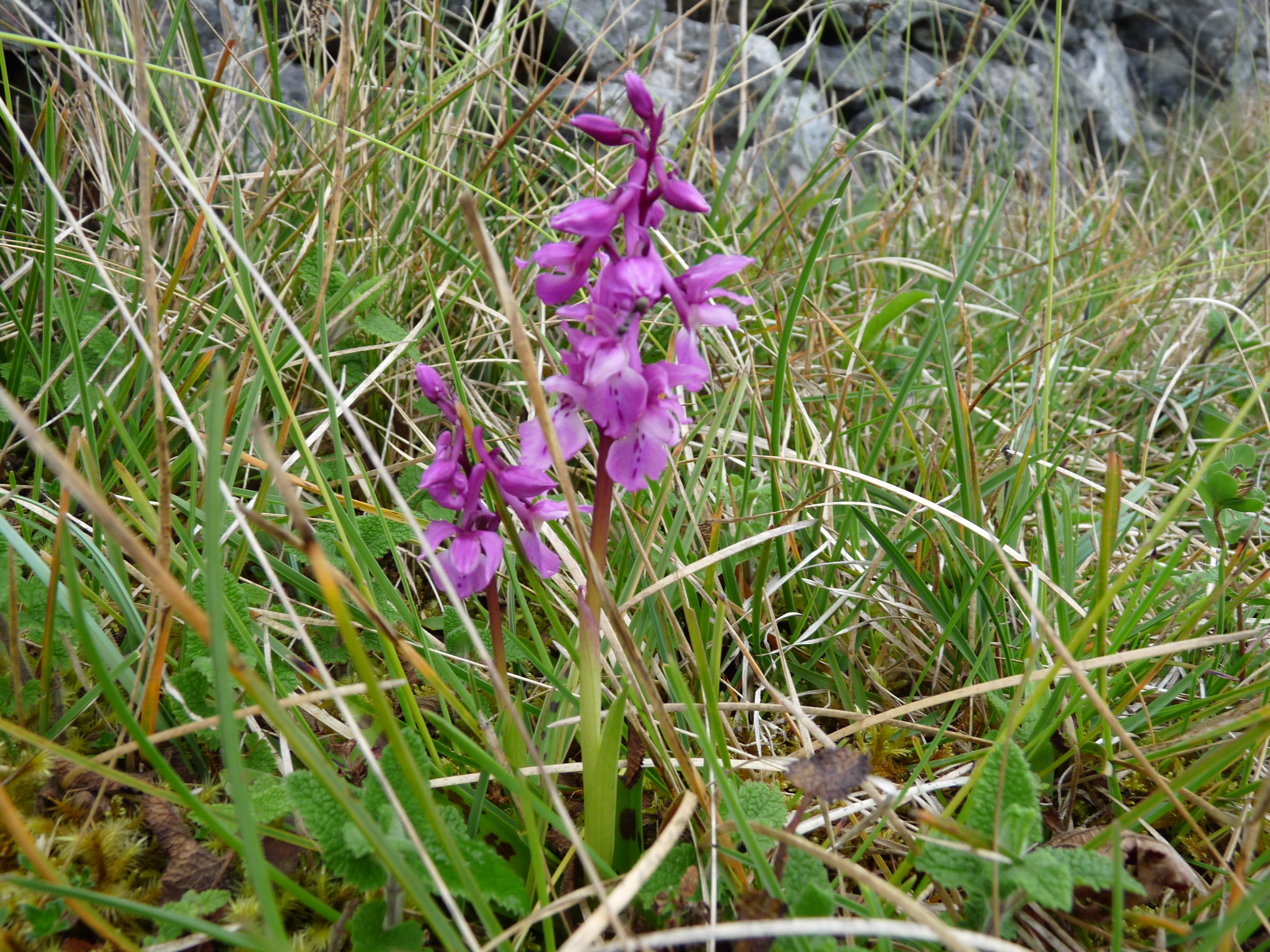
Early Purple Orchid

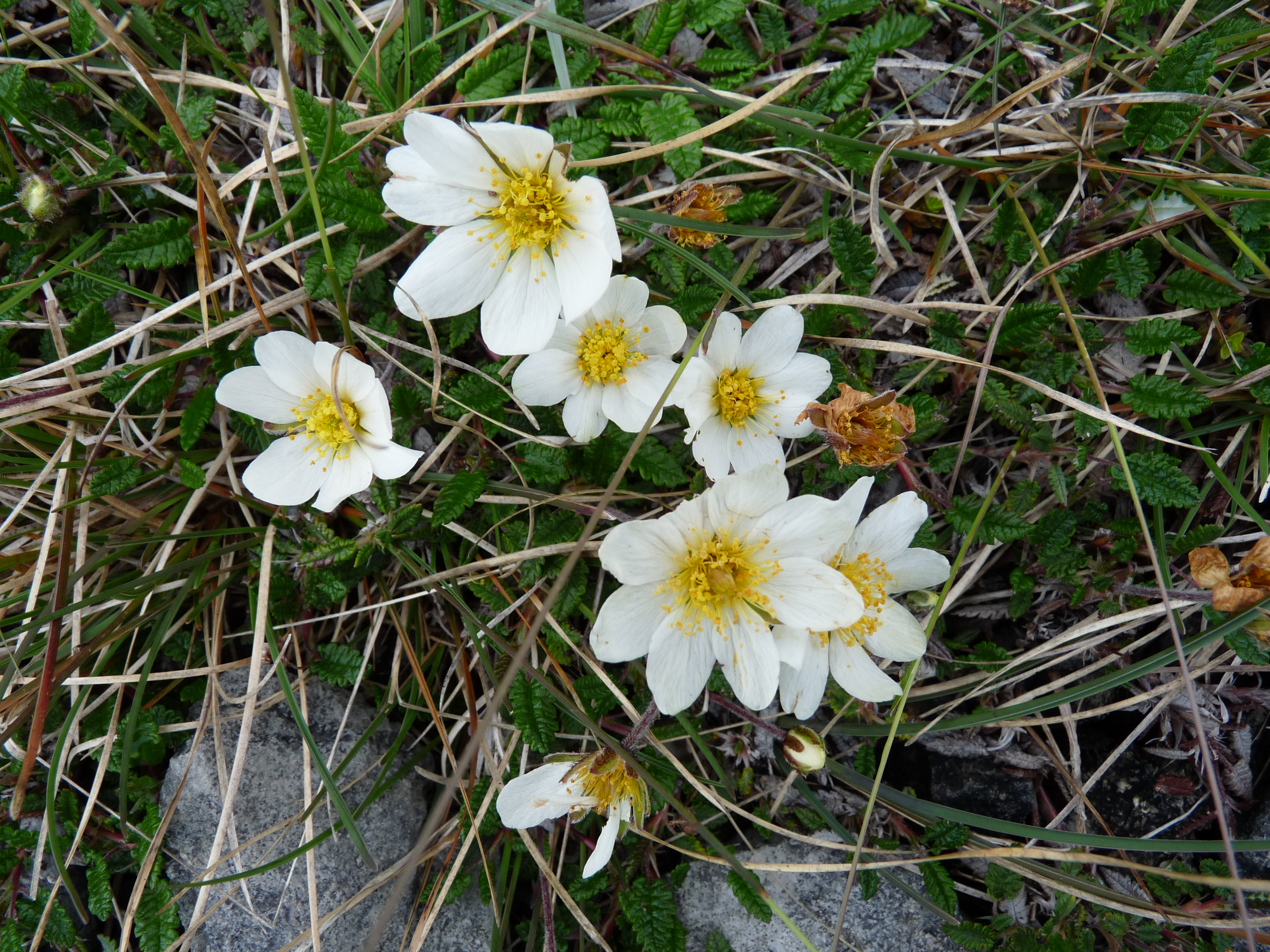
Mountain Avens

=== Flora ===
The Burren is renowned for its remarkable assemblage of plants and animals, and over 70% of Ireland's species of flowers are found there. The region supports Arctic–alpine and Mediterranean Basin plants side-by-side, due to the unusual environment.

The region supports many rare Irish species, some of which are only found in this area. Others occur in similar karst areas in western Ireland. Notable plants include Festuca indigesta seen in 1949 and Arenaria norvegica identified only once, in 1961. Two of the 24 types of Taraxacum found here are "practically unique to the Burren". 23 of the 28 types of orchids found in Ireland grow in the Burren, including unique forms such as Dactylorhiza fuchsii subsp. okellyi.

The grikes (crevices in the limestone) provide moist shelter, supporting a wide range of plants including dwarf shrubs. Where the surface of the limestone pavement is shattered into gravel many of the hardier Arctic or alpine plants can be found, while when the limestone pavement is covered by a thin layer of soil patches of grass are seen, interspersed with herbaceous plants. Among the flowers recorded from the Burren is the spring gentian, an alpine plant with bright blue flowers that are used as a symbol for the area by the national tourist board, Failte Ireland. The Irish orchid (Neotinea maculata and 21 other species of orchids ) and bloody cranesbill (Geranium sanguineum) also occur. Other notable flowers are Anacamptis pyramidalis, Platanthera chlorantha, Ophrys insectifera Euphrasia salisburgensis, Lathyrus linifolius, Carlina vulgaris, Centaurium erythraea, Succisa pratensis, Primula veris, Filipendula vulgaris, Parnassia palustris, Campanula rotundifolia, Helianthemum oelandicum, Polygala vulgaris, Saxifraga hypnoides, Potentilla fruticosa, Antennaria dioeca, Primula vulgaris, Hypericum androsaemum, Asperula cynanchica, Rhinanthus minor, Blackstonia perfoliata and Dryas octopetala. Another prominent presence in limestone grikes are around 24 species of fern, such as the Mediterranean Adiantum capillus-veneris.

The area is notable for the unusually close vicinity of both plants that hate lime and those that do well on it. Acid-loving plants such as Calluna grow well on patches of acidic peat that effectively isolates them from the underlying basic limestone.

Woody plant encroachment by Blackthorn and Hazel is a common phenomenon in the Burren. It is managed through extensive low input farming and active thinning of high density stands.

=== Fauna ===
Of the more than 30 species of butterflies and moths found in Ireland only two are not present in the Burren. Notable insects present in the Burren include the butterflies the pearl-bordered fritillary (Boloria euphrosyne), brown hairstreak (Thecla betulae), marsh fritillary (Euphydryas aurinia) and wood white (Leptidea sinapis); the moths, the Burren green (Calamia tridens, which is only present in Ireland in this area), Irish annulet (Gnophos dumetata) and transparent burnet (Zygaena purpuralis); the hoverfly Doros profuges and the water-beetle Ochthebius nilssoni. This last species is known from just five sites in the world, its type locality in northern Sweden and four marl lakes in The Burren.

The Burren is one of the main breeding areas in Ireland of the European pine marten. Also present are badgers, foxes and stoats. The hillsides of the Burren also host herds of feral goats. All seven species of bats present in Ireland can be found in The Burren. Otters live along the coast, as do grey seals.

A wide range of bird species are also found in the Burren, including crows and ravens, peregrine falcons, kestrels and various gulls.

=== Funga ===
The Burren's limestone pavements support a diverse assemblage of calcicolous lichens (i.e., growing on substrates rich in calcium carbonate) adapted to the area's unique geomorphological features. Over 130 lichen stands have been documented, with species distribution influenced by gradients of moisture, nutrient availability, and insolation. Endolithic and foliose cyanophilic lichens dominate many surfaces, particularly in more mesic microhabitats such as kamenitzas and shaded grikes, where species like Callome multipartita, Lempholemma botryosum, and Leptogium schraderi grow. Exposed rock surfaces typically host non-cyanophilic crustose species, including Circinaria calcarea and various Verrucaria species, with some communities influenced by nutrient enrichment from bird perches. Unlike other limestone environments, the Burren does not show a clear ecological succession from endolithic to epilithic species.

== History ==
=== Prehistory ===
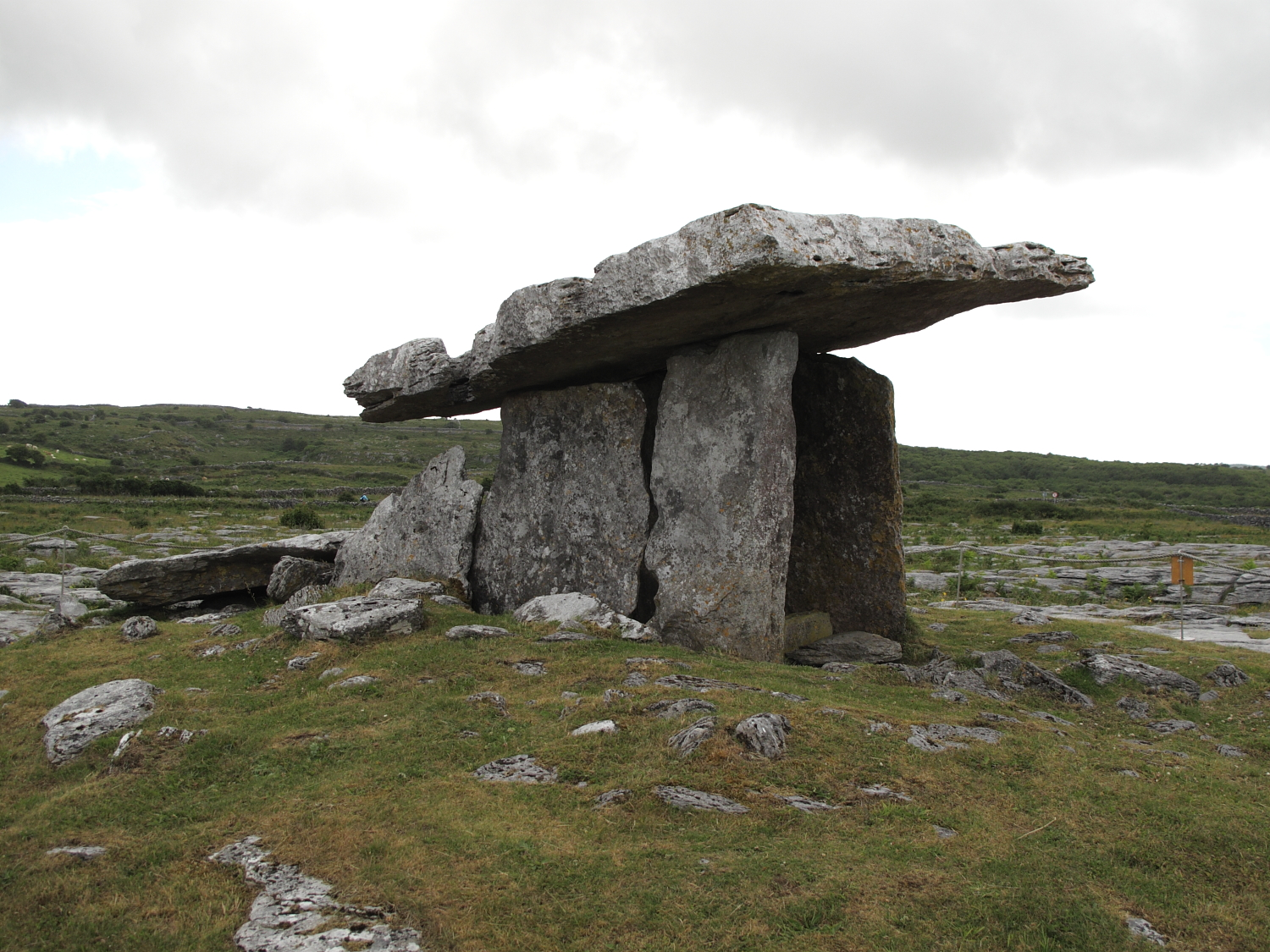
Poulnabrone portal tomb

Archaeological evidence from cave finds of butchered bones have been radiocarbon dated to 33,000 years ago, showing evidence of hunters during the Ice Age.

Pollen analysis indicates that in the Mesolithic period of 8000 to 7000 BC The Burren looked completely different from today, with most of the uplands covered in a mixture of deciduous, pine and yew trees. No clear evidence of Mesolithic settlements or camp sites in the area has yet been discovered. At the limits of the region, near Lake Inchiquin and at the so-called "Doolin Axe Factory", stone artifacts have been discovered that may be Mesolithic in origin. However, by the Neolithic, c. 4000 BC, settlers had clearly arrived and began changing the landscape through deforestation, likely by overgrazing and burning, and the building of stone walls. These people also constructed Megalithic sites like the portal tomb known as Poulnabrone dolmen and the court tombs at Teergonean (near Doolin) and Ballyganner (near Noughaval). Overall, there are around 70 megalithic tombs in the Burren area, more than half of all of these structures found in Clare.

The most numerous type of prehistoric structure (apart from stone walls) in The Burren is the late-Neolithic/early-Bronze Age wedge tomb, mostly dated to the period 2500 to 2000 BC. It accounts for around 90% of the region's megalithic tombs. Many examples of these are found on Roughan Hill near Kilnaboy, including those at Parknabinnia and Creevagh. Others are located at Gleninsheen and Berneens (Rathborney) and Poulaphuca (Carran). Large stone cairns on many hills, such as the Poulawack Cairn, also date from this period.

The economy at that time was likely based on pastoral farming in fairly small groups. As is still done today, the cattle were moved in a reverse of the usual seasonal pattern: cattle are moved to the uplands in the winter, allowing year round grazing.

Evidence of Beaker pottery was found on Roughan Hill, but in general few signs of the actual settlements of the Neolithic people have been found. This may be due to the fact that their structures were lightly built (from wood or other non-permanent materials).

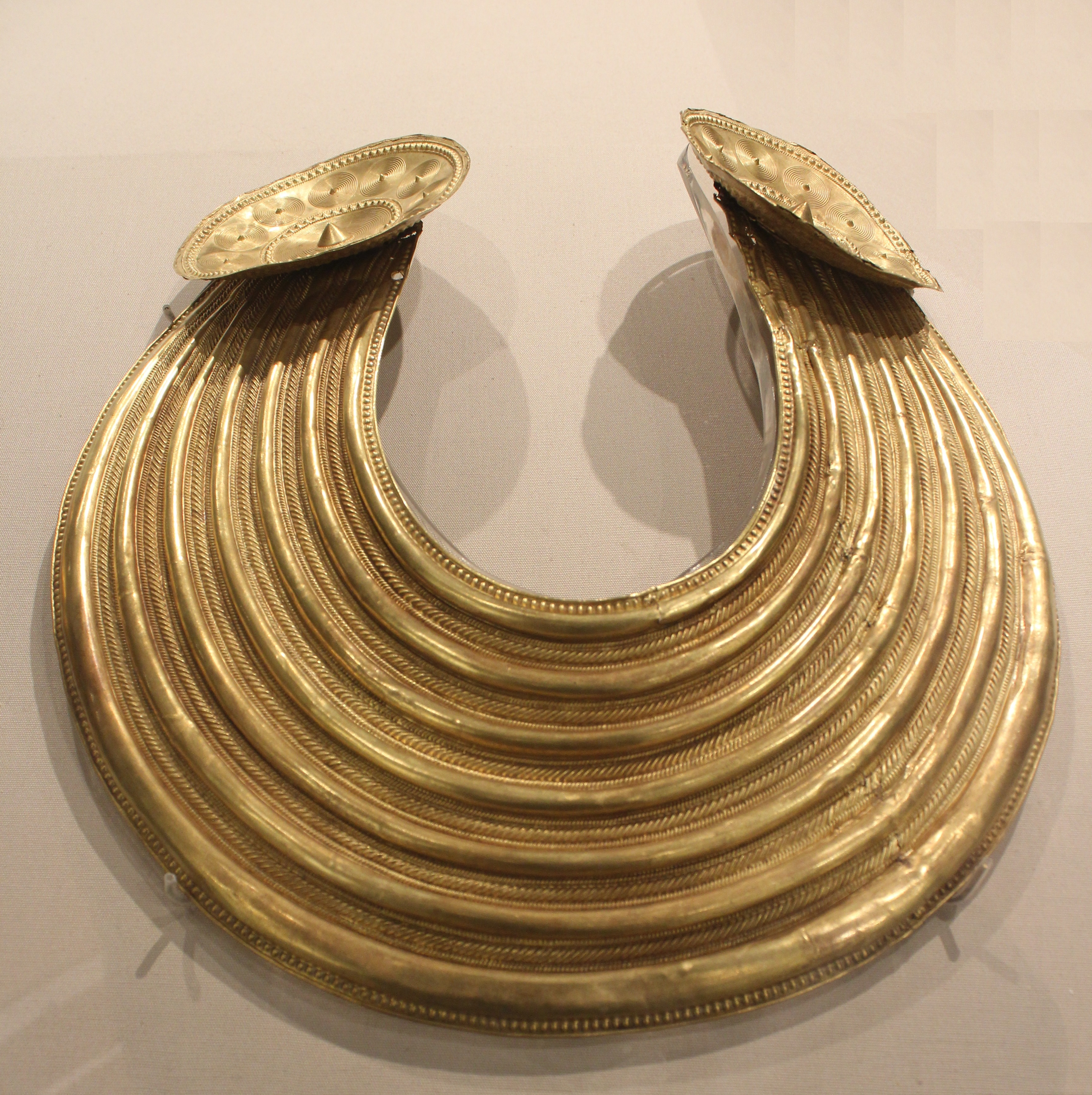
The Gleninsheen gorget, c. 800-700 BC. National Museum of Ireland, Dublin

During the Bronze Age, locals also built many Fulachtai fiadh, remains of more than 300 survive in the region. Their exact function is still debated, but they probably served as places where water was heated by fire, either for cooking, brewing or bathing purposes.

However, in contrast to the quantity of archaeological evidence found, the population of The Burren likely declined noticeably between the late Neolithic and the end of the Bronze Age. This was likely largely due to a shift in the climate, possibly related to the volcanic eruption known as "Hekla 4". Around the end of the 3rd millennium BC temperatures dropped and the climate became wetter. Heavy rainfall combined with previous clearing activity to cause serious soil erosion in the uplands. Evidence suggests that much of the soil cover over the limestone karst was in fact removed during the Middle and Late Bronze Age. This reduction in the area of fertile land put pressure on population numbers and probably increased conflicts over scarce resources. Building of new stone walls largely came to an end – there is a gap in documented building between the late Neolithic/early Bronze Age and early Christian periods. By the end of the Bronze Age, the uplands were largely depopulated.

Nevertheless, like the Mooghaun North Hoard found near Newmarket-on-Fergus, the discovery of a golden Bronze Age gorget in Gleninsheen townland indicates the (at least temporary) local presence of a late Bronze Age society that was rich, mobile and well-connected via trade networks with other regions.

Like in many places of Ireland, datable Iron Age sites are rare in The Burren. This may be due to the use of dwellings that did not leave durable traces (wooden buildings or even tents). Some of the extant ráths, cashels or cahers may actually have Iron Age origins. However, few have been excavated and those that have been the subject of research, like Cahercommaun, Caherconnel, Cahermore or Ballyallaban, are thought to be early medieval or later in origin. The large enigmatic enclosure of Turlough Hill (see Oughtmama) may be Iron Age or earlier. Definite regional findings from this era are limited to a few bronze horse bridles discovered near Corofin and at Ballyalla (Kilshanny).

=== Medieval ===
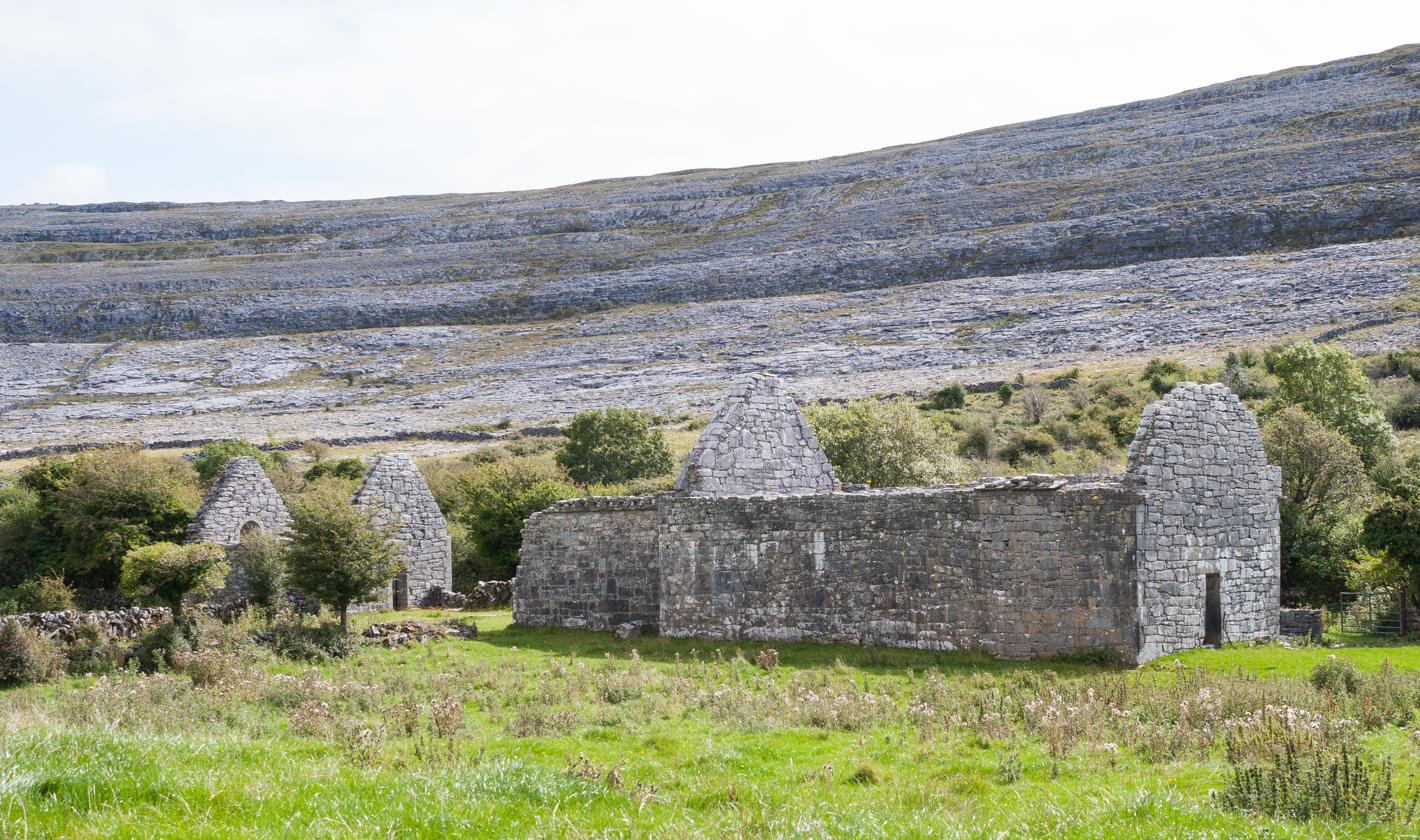
Early Christian churches at Oughtmama

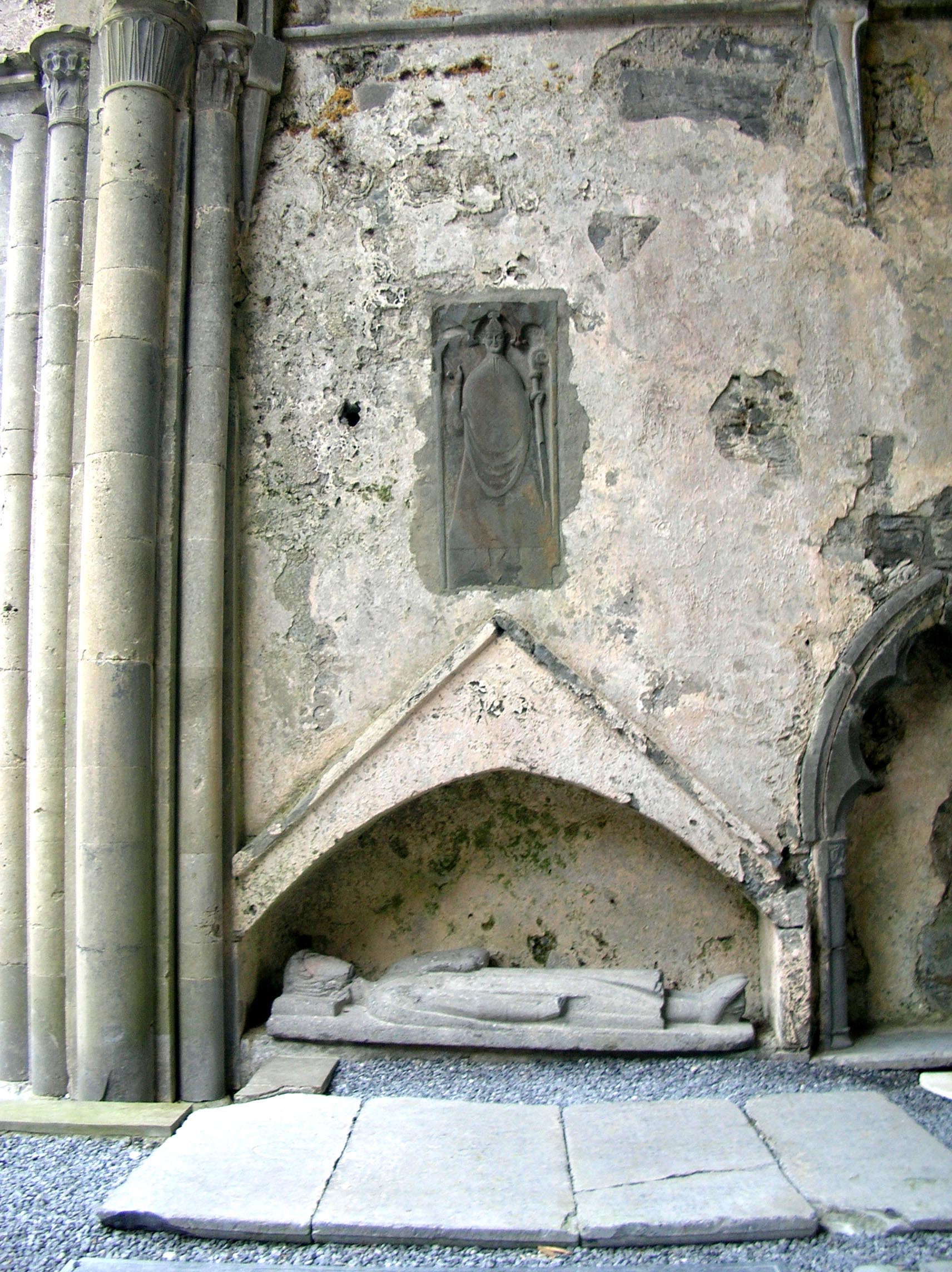
Tomb in the sanctuary of Corcomroe Abbey with effigy of Conor O'Brien, King of Thomond

In the Iron Age and early medieval times, the region was controlled by a family or tribe known as the Corco Modhruadh, meaning "seed" or "people of Modhruadh". They were one of dozens of minor tribes in Ireland at that time, which occupied a discrete area (tuath) and were joined by a common bloodline or origin myths. By the time Christianity arrived locally, their territory had shrunk somewhat, encompassing what later became the Baronies of Burren and Corcomroe as well as some parts of Inchiquin barony (see below).

During the 5th and 6th centuries, the region appears to have been ruled from the Aran Islands by the Eóganacht Árann, a minor branch of the Eóganacht dynasty of Munster.

The history of these years is uncertain, but after the decline of the Eóganacht Árann the local Corco Modhruadh likely fell under the control of the Uí Fiachrach Aidhne, a tribe from what is now southern Galway, who prospered in the 7th century. The local tribes were then probably subjects of the Eóganacht Locha Léin until their influence declined in the early 9th century. Whether the Corco Modhruadh still existed as a distinct group at that point is uncertain, as they and their neighbours Corcu Baiscind may have been assimilated into or conquered by the Déisi Tuisceart of eastern Clare, who won a major battle against the Corco Modhruadh in 744. By the 9th century, the Corco Modhruadh had been driven into the Burren uplands.

The Burren area is notable for the presence of several potential or likely "early" (i.e. pre-12th-century) ecclesiastical or monastic sites. These include Kilfenora, Kilnaboy, Temple Cronan and the churches of Oughtmama. A broader definition of The Burren would also include Dysert O'Dea Monastery near Corofin and Kilmacduagh. The large number of extant cashels, almost 500 of which have been identified in The Burren (out of around 45,000 in Ireland), also indicates the presence of a sizeable (early) medieval population that supported and used these churches.

At the end of the first millennium, the Dál gCais expanded into the region, against the resistance of the incumbent Uí Lochlainn and O'Conor families. The later regionally dominant O'Brien dynasty traced its origins to them. Evidence of Viking activity in the region is scant. They settled at Limerick, but in the Burren only a few artifacts of Scandinavian design have been found, centred mostly on Cahercommaun, which apparently was a major producer of wool at the time. A Viking arrowhead was found at the ringfort and a Viking hollow-bead necklace (likely dating from 820 to 850 AD) was discovered in nearby Glencurran Cave.

Either at the end of the 12th or early in the 13th century, Cistercian monks came to the area and established Sancta Maria de Petra Fertili, now known as Corcomroe Abbey.

In the 12th century, the Corco Modhruadh/Corcomroe territory was made into the newly created Diocese of Kilfenora, of 13 parishes, and the church at Kilfenora became a cathedral.

At some point around the 12th century, the territory of "Corcomroe" was divided in two for administrative purposes: Corco Modhruadh Iartharach ("Western Corcomroe") and Corco Modhruadh Oirthearach ("Eastern Corcomroe"), also known as Boireann which in the late 16th century became the English administrative Baronies of Corcomroe and Burren, respectively.

The end of the medieval period was a difficult era for people in the area. Like much of Europe, the region suffered from the Great Famine (1315-7) and the Black Death. In addition, infighting between the Gaelic lords contributed to a socio-economic decline of the region. This was also reflected in a regional hiatus in large construction projects during the 13th and most of the 14th century.

=== Early Modern ===
For a long-time the Anglo-Norman incursions into Ireland had little direct impact on the region. As late as at the Battle of Dysert O'Dea in 1318 some of the local clans allied to defeat a Norman army led by Richard de Clare. The people and their rulers thus continued to live in fortified houses, often inside the cashels, mostly retaining their Gaelic culture. One example of this are the Brehon law schools of the O'Davorans at Cahermacnaghten or the MacClancys at Doolin.

Only in the 15th and 16th centuries did the tower houses as exemplified today by places like Newtown Castle, Shanmuckinish Castle, Doonagore Castle or Ballinalacken Castle become widespread. Norman-type castles, such as the one built at Quin, were absent in the Burren. T.J. Westropp counted the remains of around 70 tower houses in the Baronies of Inchiquin, Corcomroe and Burren, with 21 of them located in the latter. Only around half of those 21 survive to any height in the 21st century. The distribution of the tower houses indicates that they were built close to the barony borders, which also represented the boundaries of the territories controlled by clans or families (see below). 11 of the 21 tower houses in the Barony of Burren lie within 1 km of its borders.

The O'Loughlin (Ó Lochlainn) clan ruled Boireann down to the mid-17th century from their chief residence at Gregans Castle (the tower house, not the house of the same name). The chief of the family was known in later times as the 'Prince of Burren' and clan members were buried in the family tomb near the altar of Corcomroe Abbey. Their kinsmen, the O'Conor (Ó Conchubhair), clan ruled Corco Modhruadh Iartharach from Dough Castle near Liscannor. The villages and towns found within the medieval territory of Boireann include Lisdoonvarna, Ballyvaughan, New Quay (Newquay) / Burrin (Burren), Noughaval, Bealaclugga (Bellharbour), Carron and Fanore / Craggagh.

Both clans were eventually subjects of the O'Briens, the rulers of Thomond. Especially in the southwest, the O'Briens sometimes extended their direct influence, taking over houses and territories for themselves. They controlled the castles at Dromoland and Leamaneh and later became the Barons Inchiquin.

== Culture ==
The Burren has a long history of traditional Irish music. It is particularly known for the "West Clare Style" of concertina playing, and music festivals in Doolin and Corofin. The area also has a long history as a source of artistic inspiration, and has hosted a number of art galleries.

The Burren has inspired many non-fiction books, often accompanied by extensive illustration of the landscape.

A series of detective fiction novels, written by Cora Harrison, features the Burren's brehon judge (fictional) in the early 1500s, when the area still existed as a distinct Gaelic administration.

== Economic activity ==
The leading economic activities in the Burren are agriculture and tourism.

=== Tourism ===
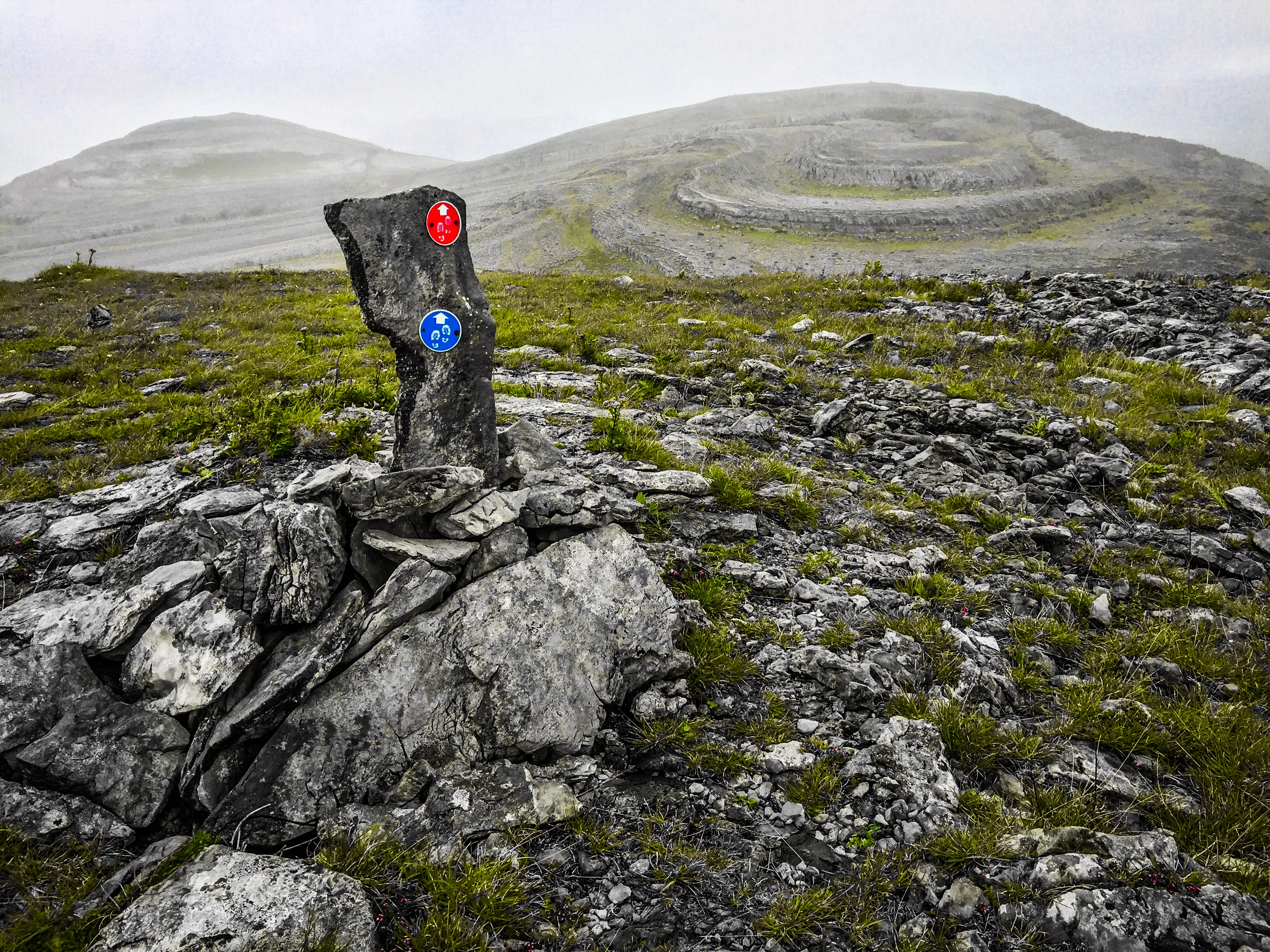
Trailheads on The Burren

The Burren has a reputation beyond Ireland, and, most notably with the Cliffs of Moher, but also with the major show caves, dolmens such as at Poulnabrone and other prehistoric sites, and centres of cultural activity, attracts tourists from a wide range of countries. There are a range of hotels, hostels, bed and breakfast facilities, and other accommodation providers.

Tourism presents some challenges in such an environmentally sensitive area, as it creates mostly seasonal employment, results in a large share of local houses being used only in the summer, and puts additional strain on environmental resources, thus exacerbating the effect of a significant increase in the number of houses in some areas during the 1990s and 2000s. This has been a thread in the development and preservation activities previously discussed, and has driven the growth of local ecotourism, and the "Leave No Trace" local campaigns. Concerns have also arisen about the level of day-tourism, especially by coaches, as opposed to overnight-staying tourists, who generate significantly more revenue.

==== Ecotourism in the Burren ====
Ecotourism is an important factor in The Burren, with many organisations involved, including the Burren Ecotourism Network. A key goal is to deal with the challenge of protecting the vulnerable landscape, while at the same time having it provide a fair income for the local inhabitants and allowing it to cope with increased visitor numbers. Sustainable ecotourism and independent "'Ecotourism Certification" for companies are intended to deal with those conflicting demands.

==== Gastro-tourism ====
A Burren Food Trail was launched in 2013, and has more than 20 members offering hospitality, and / or food and drink products. The trail won the Irish prize in the European Destination of Excellence - Tourism and Local Gastronomy competition in 2015. In association with the food trail events such as a Slow Food festival and a Food Fayre are organised. The Food Fayre, part of the Burrenbeo-coordinated Winterage Festival around the October public holiday weekend, and run by the Burren Ecotourism Network and the Burren Food Trail team, reached its sixth year in 2017.

=== Agriculture ===
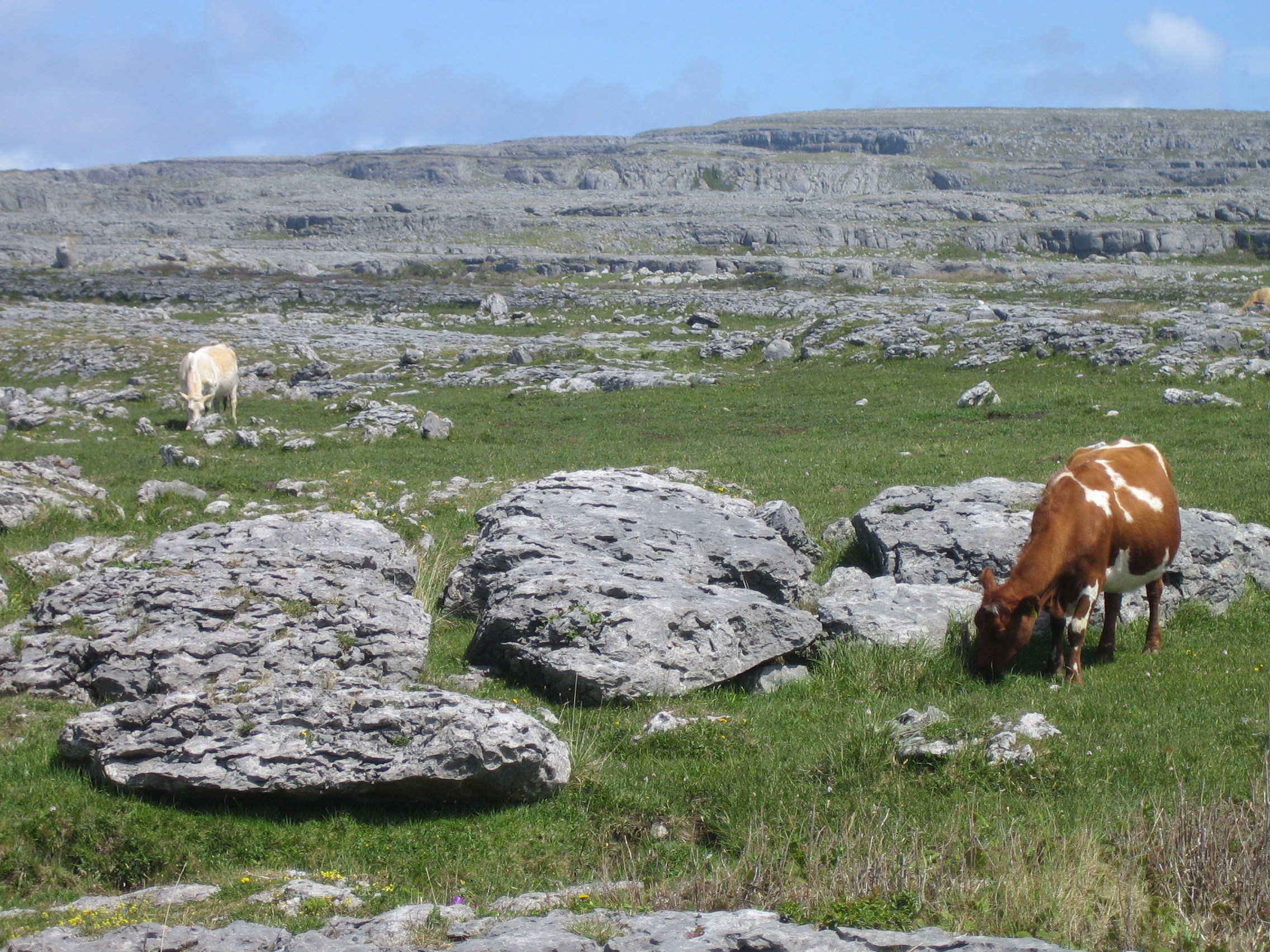
Cows grazing on The Burren

Due to climate and landscape, and techniques evolved over thousands of years, the Burren has a history as a productive agricultural landscape. Arable farming is limited, and the main animals kept are cattle and goats.

As summarized by the local landscape organisation, the Burrenbeo Trust, the traditional local system of cattle husbandry "involves exploiting the unusual attributes afforded by the region's limestone geology. Up until quite recently, hardy native breeds of beef cattle were used to graze upland grasslands between the months of October and April, requiring scarcely any dietary supplement prior to their removal to finishing grass elsewhere." Thus the agricultural methods used but also protected the landscape.

==== Challenges ====
Since the 20th century the spread of intensive farming techniques (including sometimes heavy use of nitrate fertilisers) along with the possibilities offered by heavy equipment to transform limestone pavement into pasture has posed new challenges for the ecosystem and its diversity. Research conducted in the 1990s suggests that by the end of that decade the area of limestone pavement had halved since pre-Famine times, c. 1840, while from the 1970s to the 1990s alone, about 4% of pavements were converted into pasture or covered by roads.

Despite the intensification of agriculture on the uplands, population numbers fell from around 4,000 at the beginning of the 20th century to roughly 2,500 by the time of the 1991 Census, before rising once more. The number of farmers fell by 8% in the 1990s and the average farm size increased to 100 hectares (250 acres) by 2001.

A particular issue arose from the increasing spread of brush, notably hazel, but also blackthorn and hawthorn. These colonised more of the limestone area as a result of reduced grazing by cattle and goats. The increasing industrialization of agriculture and the introduction of different breeds of cattle led to shifts in cattle-raising practices – away from winter grazing, which kept down new growth, and towards supplementary feeding. In addition, in the past saplings were often pulled from fields by hand to maintain grazing areas. Trees also used to be harvested for firewood, hazel rods were used for thatching as well as for fence- and basket-making. As these practices ceased, the brush advanced. This notably reduces biodiversity in the affected areas.

==== BurrenLIFE ====
In response to under-grazing, loss of husbandry and land management traditions, and abandonment and consolidation of farms, the BurrenLIFE program, coordinated by the geopark, launched a new sustainable farming initiative. This began with twenty farms, representative of the diversity of local agriculture, for each of which a specific plan of costed actions was devised. After refinement, the initiative was extended to 320 farmers over two phases, and another 130 are expected to join a final phase. Typical recommendations enacted included scrub clearance, restoration of drystone walls, reduction in silage usage and a return to winter grazing.

=== Balancing needs ===
For the past decades, the government and private groups have attempted to square the demands of local farmers, tourists and the environment. In particular, sometimes outdated or leaky septic tanks used by rural houses have contributed to the damage done to groundwater by agricultural practices. In a limestone environment, the use of percolation and septic tanks may in fact not be a viable alternative to sewage treatment. However, this is still lacking in much of the area. The sewage of the village of Ballyvaughan, for example, is still pumped untreated into the sea.

=== Development initiatives ===
Community and local authority programs have been launched over decades, notably a County Council initiative of the mid-2000s, which became Burren Connect in 2006, and led, in 2011, to the geopark, which in turn secured funding for the Geopark LIFE program. The Burrenbeo Trust, Burren Ecotourism Network and Burren Way Committee are other examples.

== Designations ==
Most of the Burren is today designated as a Special Area of Conservation, including almost all upland, and much of the lowland and northern shore areas. There are also designated Areas of Scientific Interest and Natural Heritage Areas.

=== Geopark ===
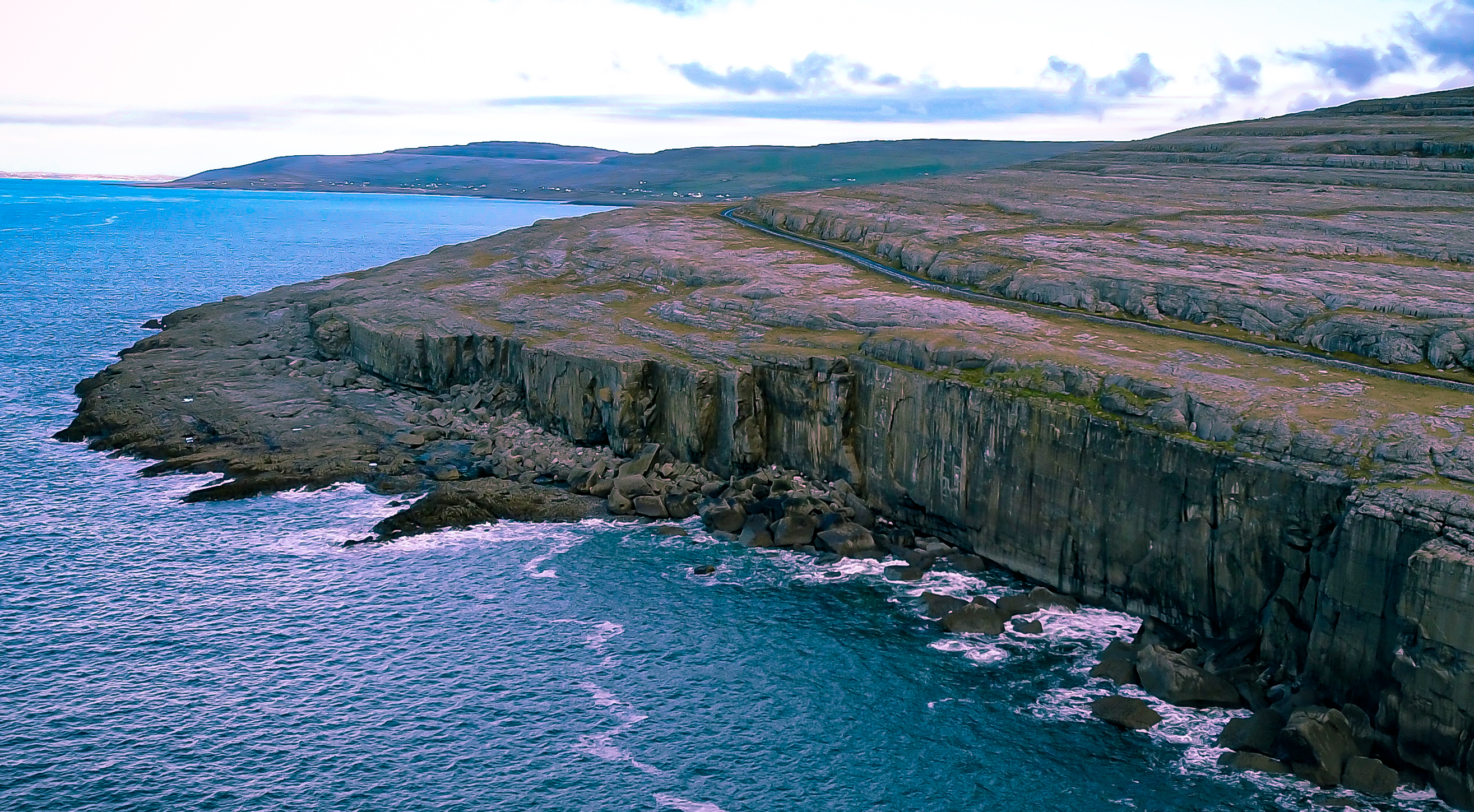
Alladie Cliffs, part of the Burren and Cliffs of Moher Geopark

The Burren and Cliffs of Moher Geopark, formed in 2011 on the basis of earlier community and local authority work, is part of the Global Geoparks Network (GGN) and recognised by UNESCO since that year. Encompassing an expansively defined Burren, including the Cliffs of Moher, it is managed by the Clare County Council and supported by Failte Ireland and the Geological Survey of Ireland. The boundary of the Geopark extends from the vicinity of New Quay on Galway Bay, southeast to the Tubber area, then southwest to Corrofin then roughly west towards Doolin and includes the coastal strip containing the Cliffs of Moher. The geopark supports education and community engagement and sustainable tourism and other development, and employs a full-time geologist, Dr. Eamon N. Doyle.

=== National Park ===
The Burren National Park is one of eight National Parks in the country. Taking in a modest sampling of the southeastern Burren, about 1,500 hectares (3,700 acres), it is made up of land purchased by the Irish government to be set aside for conservation purposes. After a prolonged controversy (see Mullaghmore and the Burren Action Group), the planned construction of a visitor centre was shelved. The National Park currently has an information point at Corofin. It is also associated with the preservation area at nearby Dromore Wood.

== Sport and leisure ==
The Burren's many limestone cliffs, particularly the sea-cliffs at Ailladie, are popular with rock-climbers. For cavers, there are a number of charted caves in the area, notably Pollnagollum. Doolin is a popular "base camp" for cavers, and is home to one of the two main cave-rescue stores of the Irish Cave Rescue Organisation.

The Burren is popular with walkers and trails include the Burren Way, often taken over a five-day period, and the Cliffs of Moher Coastal Walk of 18 kilometres (11 mi).

The Burren also has a range of local Gaelic Athletic Association clubs, soccer clubs and other sporting groups.

== Gallery ==
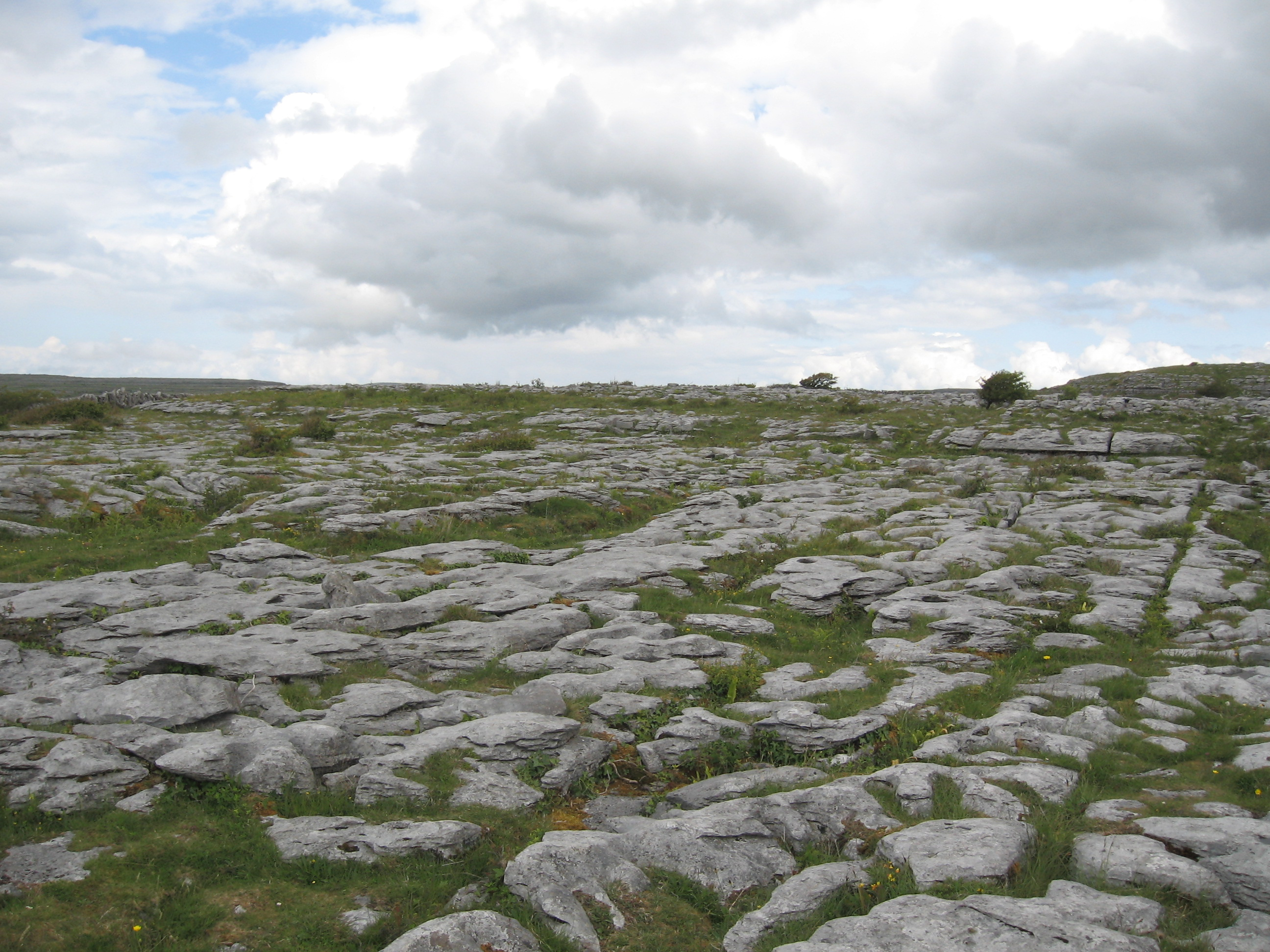
The Burren landscape

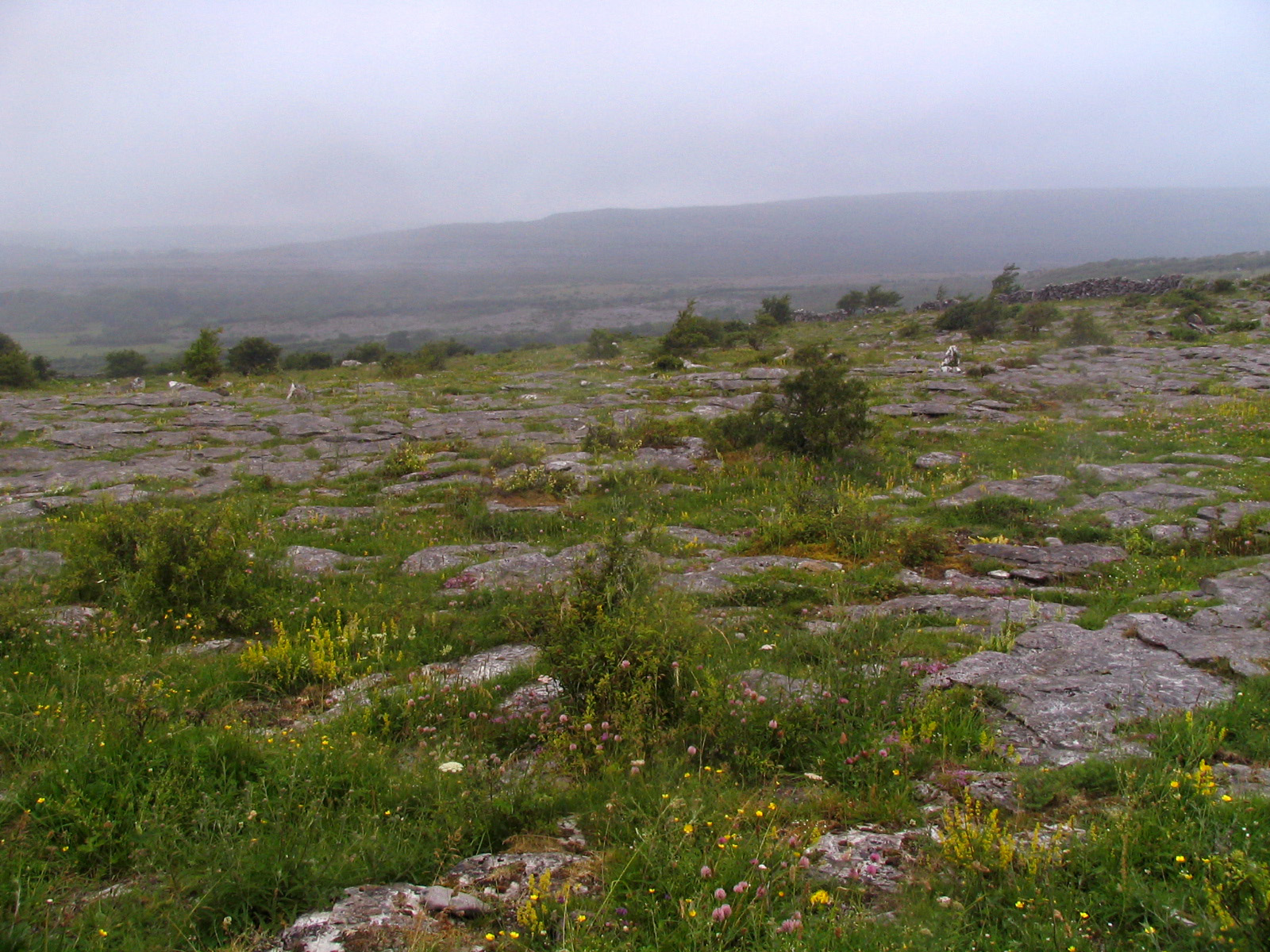
Karst meadow

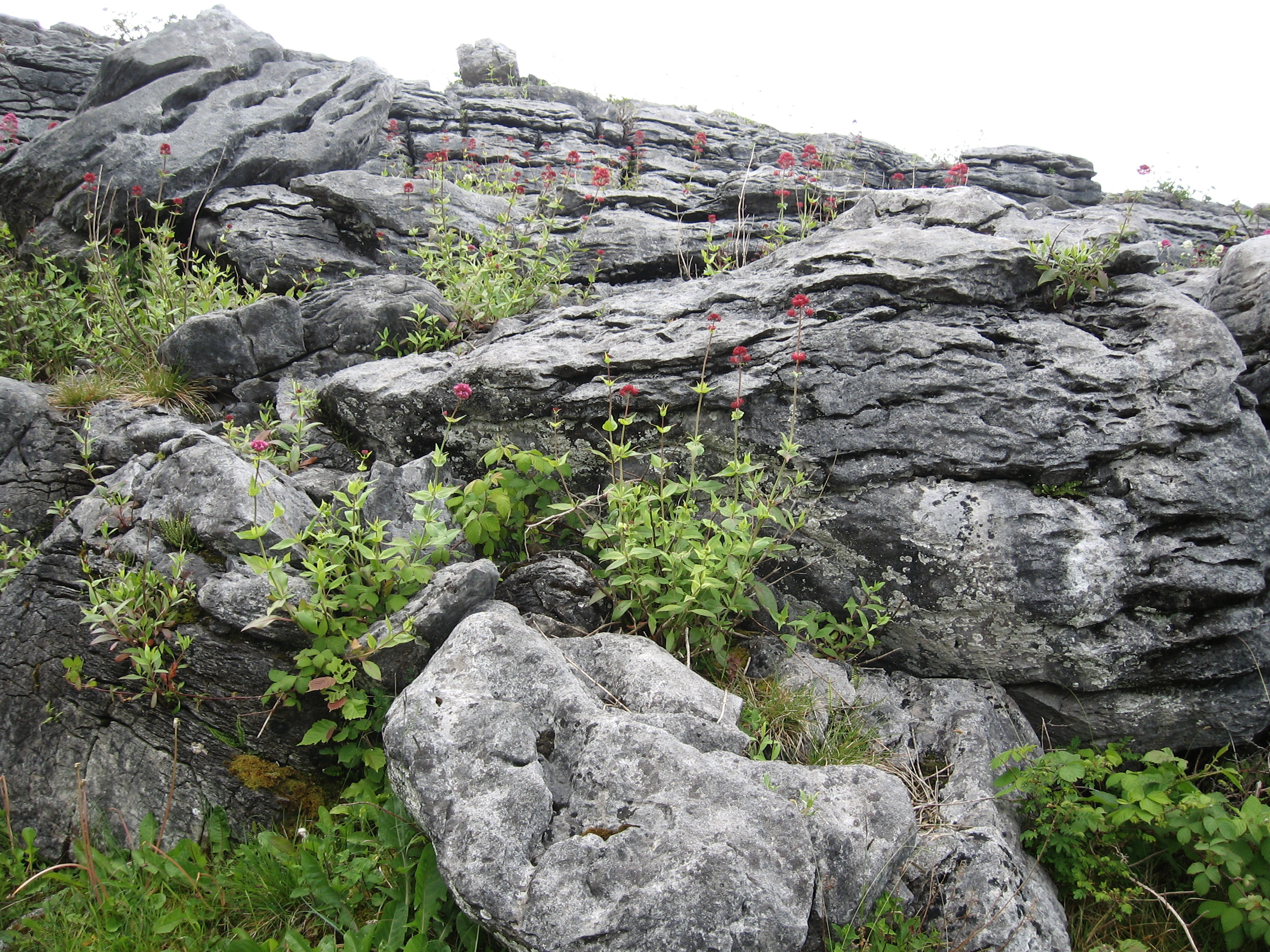
Native flowers and rock formations

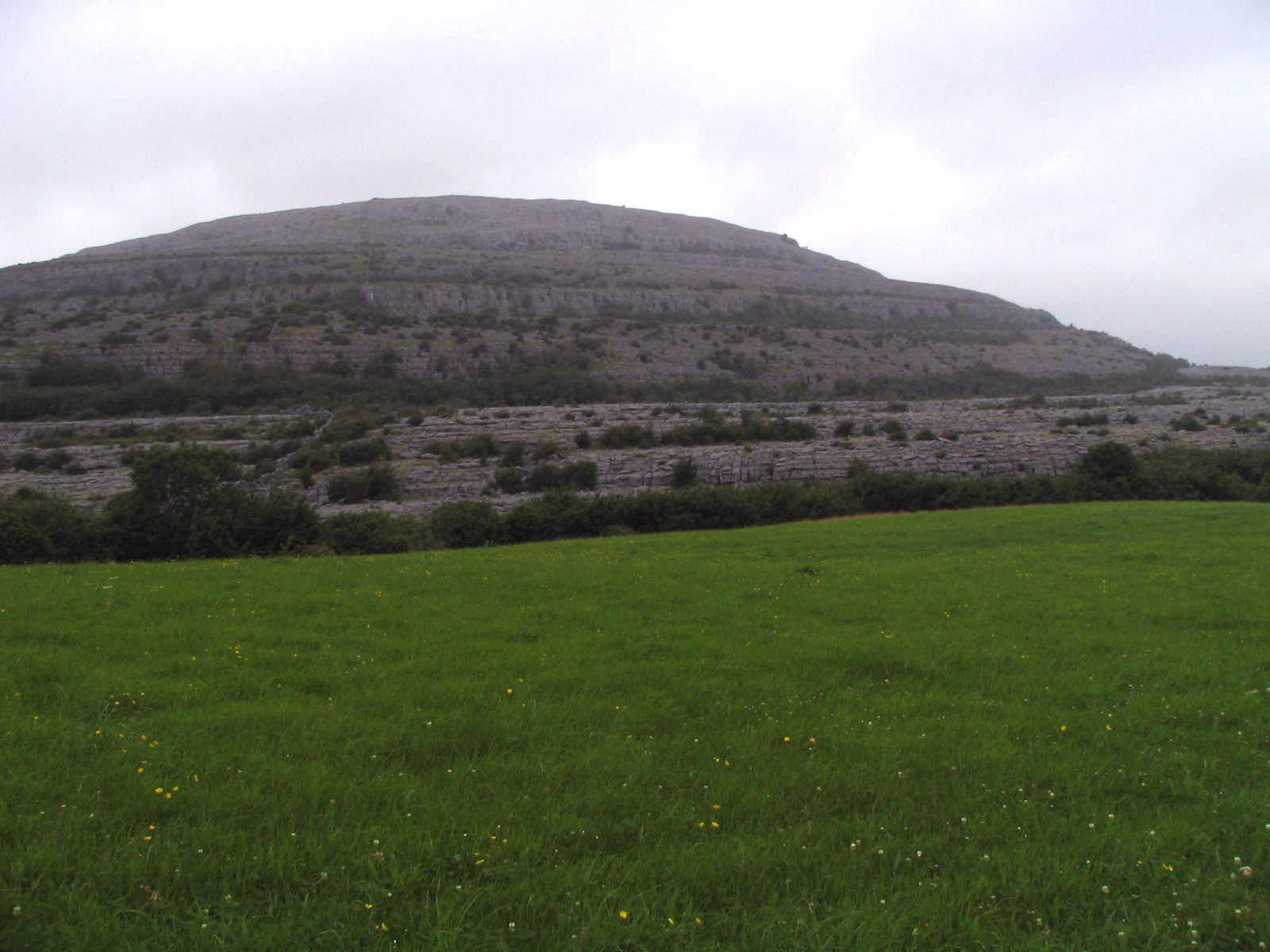
Karst dome near Kilkeedy Parish - eastern part of The Burren

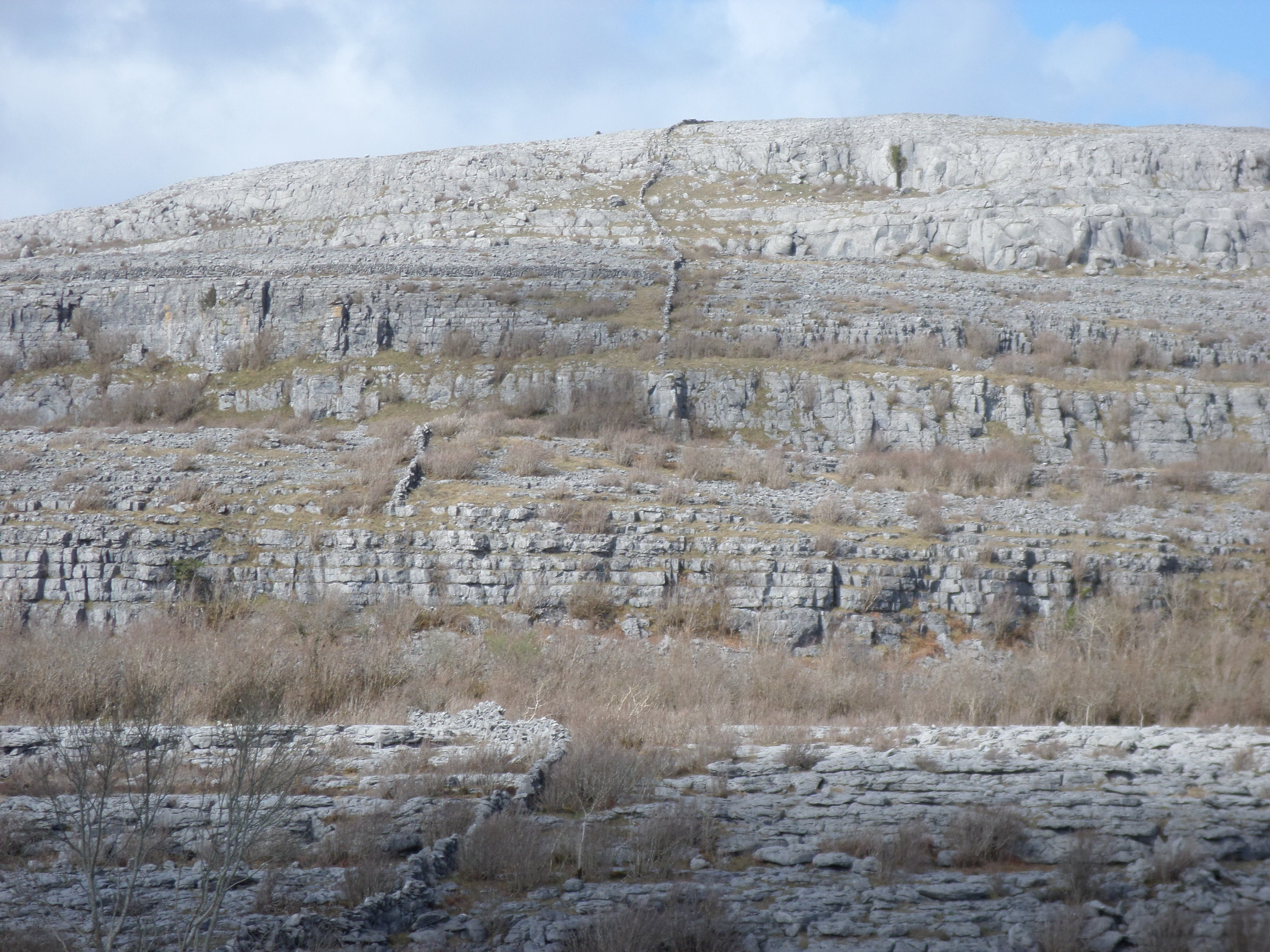
A dry stone wall going up the side of a hill

== See also ==
- Burren Action Group
- Slieve Rua
- Wild Atlantic Way
- List of tourist attractions in Ireland

== Notes ==
1. BBC: The Flowers of the Burren, County Clare, Ireland
2. A similar quote "The Burren affordeth not a piece of timber sufficient to hang a man, water in any one place to drown a man, or earth enough in any one part to bury him." can be found in "The Journal of Thomas Dineley", 1681, in the National Library of Ireland. Extracts from his journal, including his account of the Clare section of his journey, were published in the Journal of the Royal Society of Antiquaries, 6 (1867). These appear in an online version in "The History and Topography of the County of Clare" by James Frost Part II. History of Thomond Chapter 28 Barony of Burren

== Bibliography ==
=== General, Geology, Landscape ===
- Feehan, J., Korff, A. & O'Connell, J.W., The Book of the Burren, Irish Books and Media, 1991
- D’Arcy & Hayward. The Natural History of The Burren.
- D'Arcy, Gordon: The Breathing Burren, Cork: Collins Press, 2016
- Clements, Paul: Burren Country: Travels Through an Irish Limestone Landscape, Cork: Collins Press, 2011 (reprint)
- Poyntz, Sarah: Burren Villages, Cork: Mercier Press, 2006
- Hennessy, R., McNamara, M., & Hoctor, Z., 2010 Stone, Water & Ice: A Geology Trip Through the Burren. Burren Connect Project, pp. 64.
- Sheehy Skeffington, M., Moran, J., O Connor, Á., Regan, E., Coxon, C. E., Scott, N. E. & Gormally, M. 2006. Turloughs – Ireland’s unique wetland habitat. In: Biological Conservation 133:265-290.
- Anon. The Burren: A Guide. Shannonside Mid-Western Regional Tourism Organization Ltd., Limerick.

=== Flora ===
- D.A. Webb & M.J.P. Scannell. 1983 Flora of Connemara and The Burren. Royal Dublin Society & Cambridge University Press.
- E. C. Nelson. Checklist of Plants of The Burren Region.
- E.C. Nelson & W. Walsh. The Burren Wildflowers, Conservancy of The Burren, An Bothan, Ballyvaughan, Co. Clare.
- McCarthy, P.M. and Mitchell, M.E. 1988. Lichens of the Burren Hills and the Aran Islands. Galway. Officina Typographica.

=== Fauna ===
- Bilton, D.T., 1988. A survey of aquatic Coleoptera in Central Ireland and the Burren. In: Bulletin of the Irish biogeographical Society 11: 77–94.
- Foster, G.N., Nelson, B.H. & O Connor, A. 2009. Ireland Red List No. 1 - Water beetles. National Parks and Wildlife Service, Department of Environment, Heritage and Local Government, Dublin.
- O'Callagan, E., Foster, G.N., Bilton, D.T. & Reynolds, J.D. 2009 Ochthebius nilssoni Hebauer new for Ireland (Coleoptera: Hydraenidae), including a key to Irish Ochthebius and Enicocerus. Irish Naturalists' Journal 30: 19-23

=== Archaeology ===
- Carthy, Hugh: Burren Archaeology, Cork: Collins Press, 2011
- T. J. Westropp, 1999, Archaeology of The Burren: Prehistoric Forts and Dolmens in North Clare Clasp Press (reprint)
