= Mullaghmore, County Clare =

Hill in County Clare, Ireland

Mullaghmore
- Mullach Mór
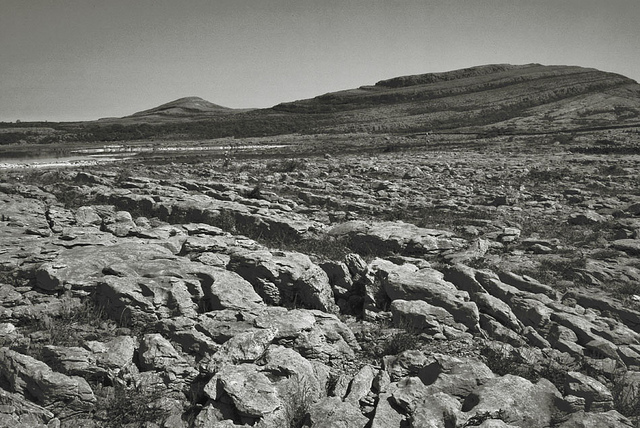
- Mullaghmore hill (right)

Highest point
- Elevation: 180 m (590 ft)
- Coordinates: 53°0′28.5402″N 9°0′7.887″W

Naming
- Language of name: Irish

Geography
- Location within Ireland
- Location: County Clare, Ireland
- OSI/OSNI grid: R296954
- Topo map: OSi Discovery 52

Geology
- Mountain type: Sedimentary

Mullaghmore (Irish: Mullach Mór, meaning 'Great Summit') is a 180 metres (590 ft) limestone hill in The Burren in Glenquin, Kilnaboy County Clare, Ireland. It is part of a hiking trail called the Mullaghmore Loop in the Burren National Park.

== Burren Visitor Centre Controversy ==
Throughout the 1990s, a long running conflict about a proposed visitor centre.

In April 1991, the Minister of State of the Irish Department of Finance announced a plan for the construction of an interpretative visitors' centre at Mullaghmore by the Office of Public Works (OPW). This would have made use of EU Regional and Social funds earlier allocated by the European Commission after a general approval of the Irish tourism program that did not, however, take a stand on any specific projects.

The proposal quickly resulted in opposition from a number of groups and individuals. These different groups came together in the Burren Action Group or BAG. They worked out an alternative proposal for a visitor centre. However, there was also a counter-mobilisation by prominent representatives of local communities. These included groups such as the Irish Farmers' Association (IFA), the Gaelic Athletic Association (GAA), as well as politicians from the centre-right. Their coalition became known as Burren National Park Support Association and emphasized the economic potential of the OPW proposal as well as the prospect of much needed jobs in a high unemployment area.

In June 1991, the WWF UK lodged a complaint against the project with the European Commission. It was later joined by An Taisce. They argued that the project would be in violation of Community law regarding the protection of groundwater. In February 1992, OPW published an environmental impact assessment, at the request of the commission. This, as well as a follow-up study, were criticized by the WWF.

In early 1992 a car park was cleared at the site, sewage works commenced and foundations for the centre were constructed.

In October 1992, the Commission stated that it would not initiate a procedure against the Irish government on this issue.

By November 1992 seven key members of the BAG had sought an injunction at the Irish High Court against the construction work. This argued that the OPW's exemption from the need for planning permission was unconstitutional and that the OPW lacked the statutory power to build the visitor centre.

In December 1992, the WWF and An Taisce brought an action at the European Court of Justice, claiming that 2.7 million Irish pounds of Community funds allocated to the project should be suspended. The Court, however, dismissed the application.

In January 1993, a key political ally of BAG, Michael D. Higgins became Minister for Arts, Culture and Gaeltacht.

In early 1993 work at the proposed site stopped, following action by BAG at the Irish High Court. The High Court found in February that the OPW had unconstitutionally and illegally initiated construction and that it did indeed lack the relevant statutory power. OPW appealed, but the injunction was upheld.

One week after the High Court decision, emergency legislation passed through both houses of the Irish parliament and was signed into law by the president. The State Authorities (Development and Management) Bill, 1993, attempted to make the OPW and other state organisations exempt from planning laws.

In June 1994 the High Court found that the OPW had the right to resume work under the newly introduced legislation. Minister Michael D. Higgins nevertheless stopped the project.

By March 1995 the state had abandoned plans to complete the centre and the OPW application for construction was withdrawn. This resulted in heavy criticism from those who had been in favour of the project, including local Fianna Fáil politicians. Minister Higgins commissioned a new overall plan for the Burren National Park. This aimed at retaining the majority of EU funding for a new centre to be based on more consensus. Some of the Community funds were to be used for the demolition of those structures already constructed.

The OPW did later try to go ahead with a scaled down version of the centre. This was supposed to consist of an entry point to the park, toilets, ranger accommodation and a roofed area on the site of the originally planned interpretive centre. There were also plans for a car park for 76 cars and to retain an existing water treatment facility on the site of a nearby quarry.

In 1999 the Clare County Council refused planning permission for this new version. This was challenged by both sides of the controversy. On the one hand, the Minister for the Arts, Gaeltacht and the Islands, Sile De Valera and the OPW claimed that the centre would have minimal visual impact and no significant adverse effects on the area. On the other hand, An Taisce and the Burren Action Group also appealed. However, they wanted to strengthen the planning refusal. They argued that the centre's concept was fundamentally flawed and not environmentally sustainable. In particular, placing the visitor centre in the middle of the park rather than on its border would prevent the local communities from benefitting from it. Also, according to them, the large number of visitors would have caused substantial environmental damage to the very ecosystem the National Park was supposed to protect.

In 2000 An Bord Pleanála confirmed the ruling by the Clare County Council to refuse planning permission for the scaled down version. The Burren Action Group and An Taisce welcomed this decision. An Bord Pleanála argued that the centre would have involved unacceptable damage to the environment and to the fragile local ecology and would have detracted from the scenery and rural character of the area. However, supporters of the scheme argued that a focal point for tourism in the Burren National Park would still be needed, as it would stop visitors from entering private lands.

In 2001 existing structures at the centre site were demolished.

In 2012, the Irish National Parks and Wildlife Service lodged a planning application with Clare County Council for a 27 space car park on the site of the overflow car park of the original interpretative centre. This is supposed to reduce parking on road verges and improve access to the park, where recently five walking trails have been developed. The goal is to improve access for existing levels of visitors. The wildlife service argues that it would be the only formal parking area in the whole National Park and that no other services will be provided at the site. No impact on EU-protected habitats was envisaged. However, the planning process was put on hold after the Clare County Council voiced 'serious concerns' over the NPWS application.
