= Caherconnell Stone Fort =

Medieval stone ringfort in County Clare, Ireland

- Cathair Chonaill
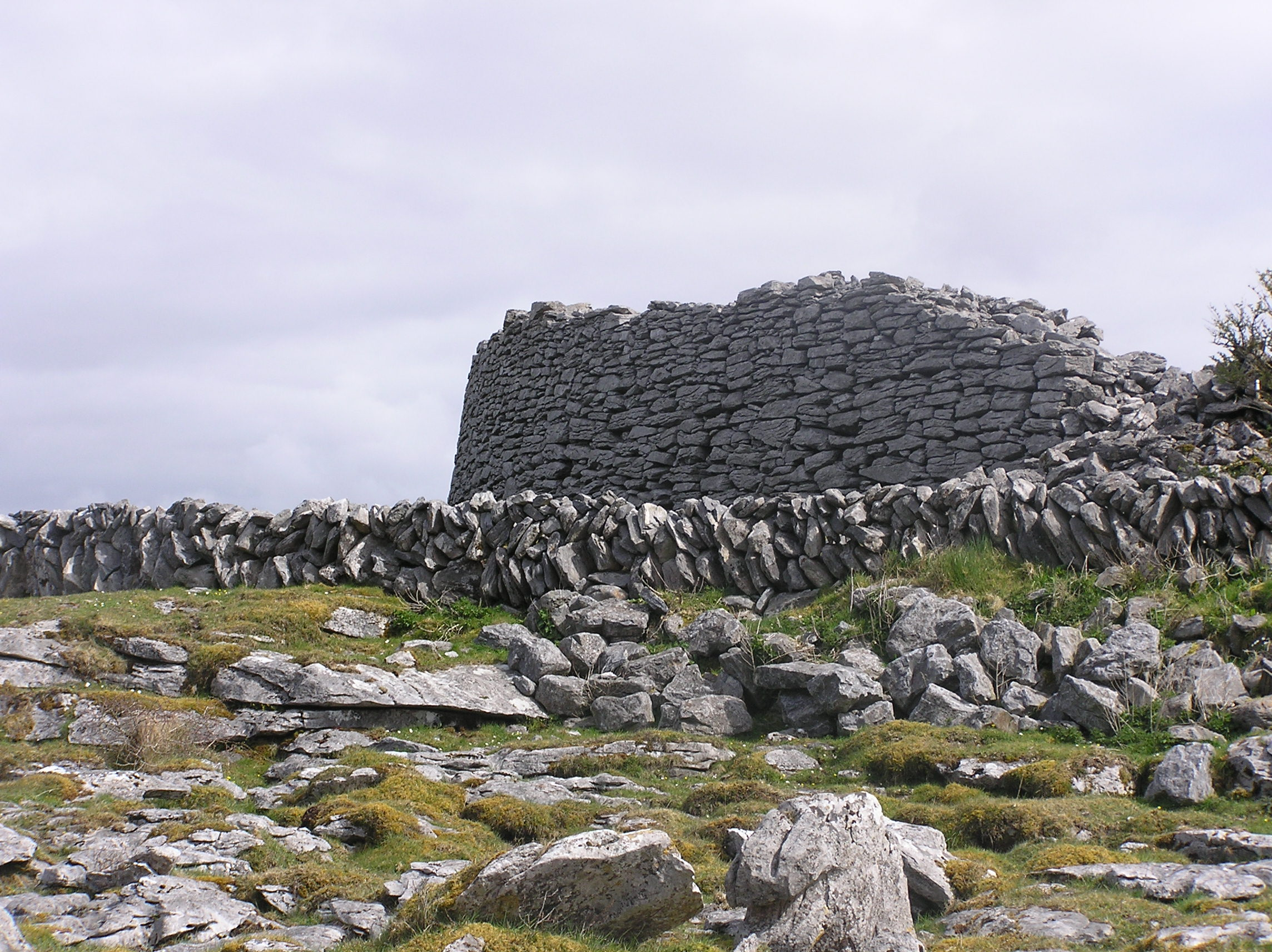
- Part of the wall of Caherconnell Stone Fort

- Location within Ireland
- 53.04075°N 9.139172°W
- Type: Ringfort
- Periods: Medieval
- Location: Parish of Kilcorney, the Burren
- Region: Ireland

Site notes
- Archaeologists: Graham Hull
- Owner: private
- Public access: yes

Caherconnell (Irish: Cathair Chonaill, meaning 'Conall's stone ringfort') is an exceptionally well-preserved medieval stone ringfort in region known as the Burren, County Clare, Ireland. It lies about 1 km south of the Poulnabrone dolmen.

== Location ==
Caherconnell lies west of the R480 road connecting Ballyvaughan and Leamaneh Castle in the townland of Caherconnell, parish of Kilcorney, Barony of Burren, County Clare. The local geology is karst limestone and the land is used for pasture.

== Description ==
Caherconnell features a circular drystone enclosure wall with a diameter of 42 metres. Walls are up to 3 metres thick and up to 3 metres high. The amount of loose stones suggests an original height of around one extra metre. The wall is made of local limestone. The entrance gap is located to the east.

Inside the enclosure are the remains of a dividing drystone wall, around a metre wide. There are also two visible structures. Structure A is located next to the north wall of the fort. It is rectangular with the long axis running east to west, measuring roughly 10m by 5m. Structure B is next to the west wall of the fort, measuring around 7.5m by 5m internally. Its north wall is part of the dividing wall.

Some additional structures surround the ringfort. The existence of a souterrain has been surmised but nothing definite has been found.

The fort shows numerous similarities with Cahermore ringfort and Cahermacnaghten, two other cashels that remained in use until a relatively late date.

== Excavations ==
According to Radiocarbon dating conducted in connection with an archaeological excavation in the summer of 2007, the ringfort mostly dates from the early 10th to mid-12th century. Occupation deposits indicate the fort was used from around the early 10th century to the early 13th century. The later structure A with a rectangular outline was likely built between the early 15th and mid-17th century. It is not certain whether the cashel was continuously inhabited or temporarily abandoned in the 14th century.

Findings indicate that the inhabitants not only consumed relatively high-status items but were also manufacturing them at the site (pin-making mould). There seems to have been precious metal work going on and there are signs of ironworking (slag, possible anvil position). The archaeological report also notes that: "The imposing morphology of the site, its walls and diameter, sets it apart from the vast majority of cashels in the Burren". The relatively long use - well into modern times - is attributed to the fact that the area, controlled by the O'Loghlen family, was not directly affected by Anglo-Norman influences but remained culturally Gaelic for a long time.

The inhabitants of the 15th/16th century were not from the main branch of the family, which had moved to Glensleade Castle, about 3 km to the north.

Postholes of an earlier – Neolithic or Bronze Age – rectangular timber structure have been found to the southwest. They were discovered during examination of an adjacent later stone building. This appears unique in Ireland and Britain and is still the subject of analysis. It may have served as a medieval corn-drying kiln, but the presence of the partial remains of three people, dumped at its entrance and dating to the 15th or 16th century, presents a mystery.

== Today ==
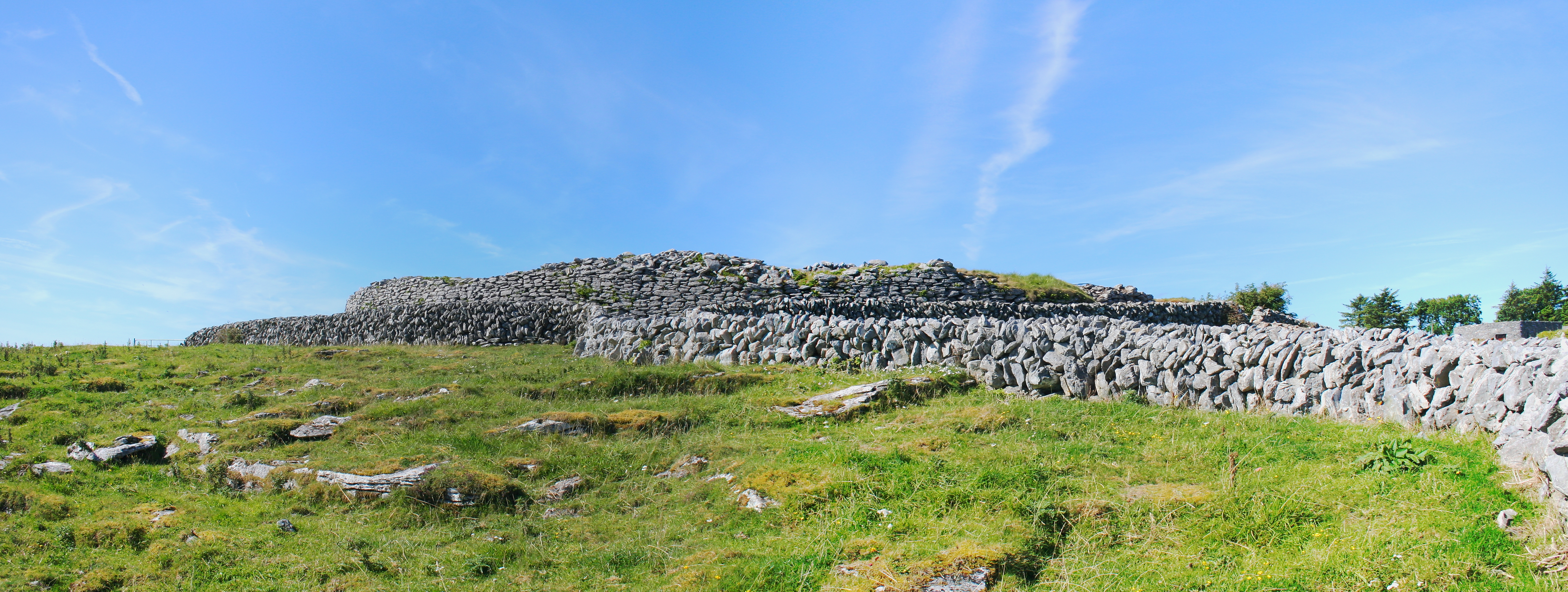
Caherconnell Fort

The ringfort is open to the public. The owner runs a visitor centre with an audio visual presentation and café.

From summer 2010, Caherconnell has been home to an archaeological field school where students can learn archaeological techniques from leading archaeologists.
