= Rathborney =

Civil parish in County Clare, Ireland

Rathborney Ráth Boirne
- Civil parish
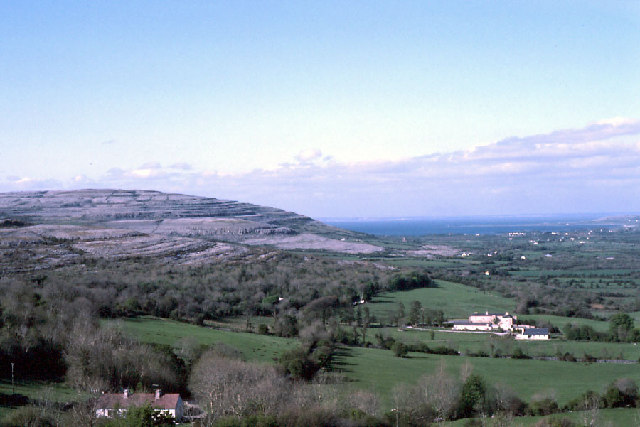
- Gregan's Castle Hotel (mid-foreground) and the valley to Ballyvaughan from Corkscrew Hill, the Burren. The hill of the left (west) is Cappanawalla.

- Location within Ireland
- Coordinates: 53.084127°N 9.179427°W
- Country: Ireland
- County: Clare

Rathborney, sometimes Rathbourney, (Irish: Ráth Boirne) is a civil parish in the Barony of Burren in County Clare, Ireland.

== Location ==
Rathborney parish is in the Barony of Burren, 8.5 miles (13.7 km) from the village of Burren on the road to Ennistymon. It is 2.25 miles (3.62 km) SSW of Ballyvaughan and includes territory in the valley of Ballyvaughan, the slopes of surroundings hills and the side valley of the Rathborney river (also known as Feenagh Valley). The parish is 5 by 4 miles (8.0 by 6.4 km), and covers 9,633 acres (3,898 ha). The highest point is Cappanavulla hill, on the northern boundary, at 1,023 feet (312 m) above sea level. Much of the parish is rocky hill pasture, and there is some blanket bog in the west of the parish.

== Demographics ==
In 1841, the parish had a population of 1,000 in 177 houses.

Historical population
Year	Pop.	±% p.a.
1841	1,000	—
1996	80	−1.62%
2002	101	+3.96%
Source: Clare County Library

== Antiquities ==
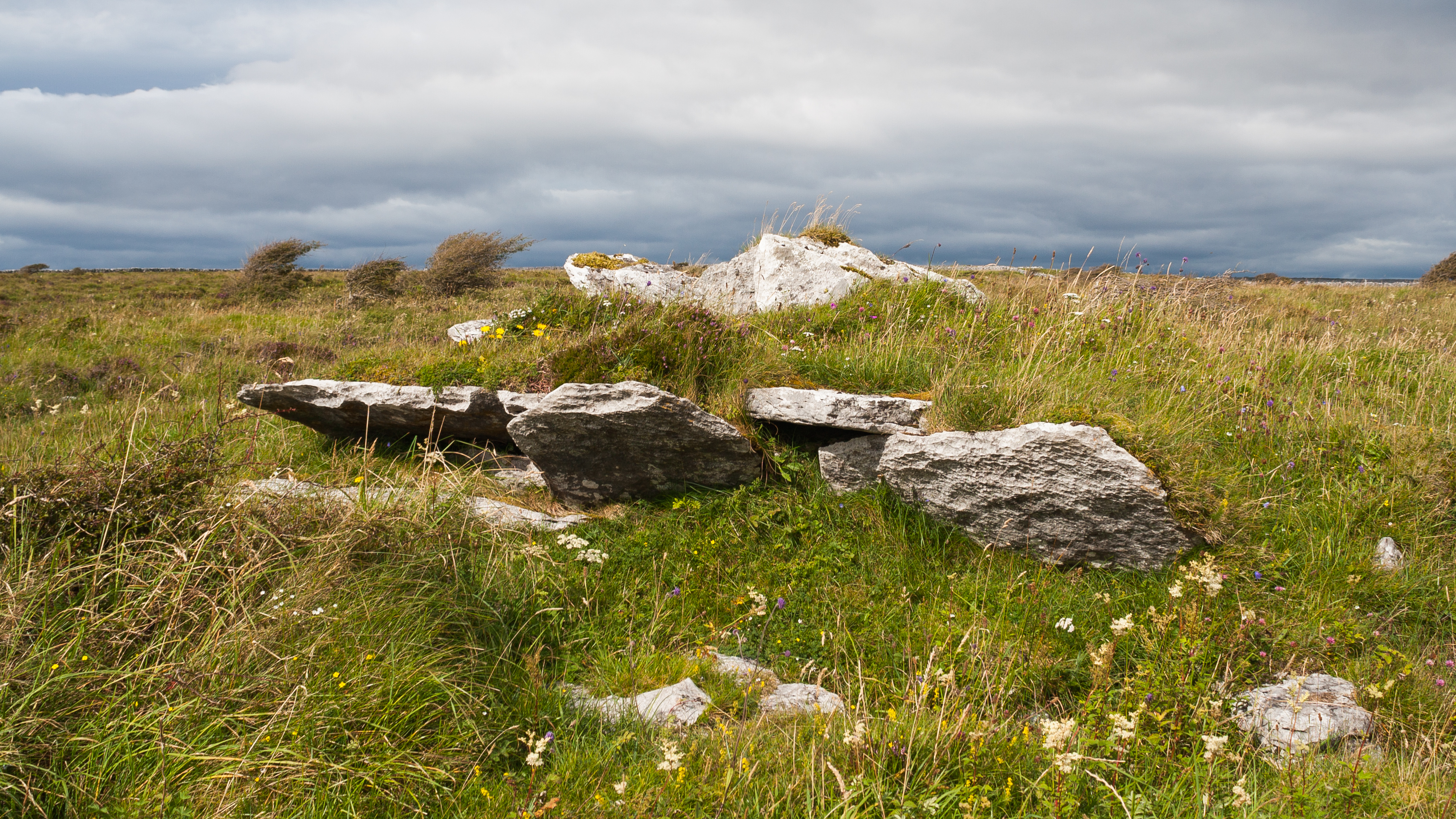
Faunarooska wedge tomb

The parish includes numerous prehistoric and historic sites, including several ringforts such as the earthen Ballyallaban ringfort and the limestone Cahermore ringfort. At Cahermacnaghten stands the central cashel of the O'Davoran family with the ruins of their law school nearby. In Faunarooska townland there are several wedge tombs. In Gleninsheen townland, the Gleninsheen Gorget was discovered in 1932. There are also remains of more wedge tombs, known as the Gleninsheen wedge tombs.

There are two church ruins within 500 m of each other, both in Croagh North townland. One is known as Glenaraha (Gleann na Ratha or Valley of the Ráths or Ringforts), with a ringfort (Doontorpa) nearby. It is a large t-shaped church with a vestry to the east. According to a sign in the west annexe, it was built in 1795 by the 1st Marquess of Buckinghham for use by his tenants. By 1837 the church had been enlarged and 40 acres of land allotted for use by the parish priest.

The other church is known as Rathborney Church, from Ráth Bhoirne (the Ráth of the Burren) and was built inside the remains of another ringfort. Most of the remains date to the 15th century, when a smaller earlier church was almost completely rebuilt. Parts of the east and north wall date to that original structure. Later features include the ornate east window and the pointed arch of the doorway in the south wall. A graveyard surrounds the church and it includes several crude grave markers of unknown date. There is also a bullaun. Its presence and the fact that the original church was built before 1302 inside a ringfort may indicate a monastic origin for this site. The church ruin both inside and out is an active graveyard private to local families.

The rebuilt tower house and hotel of Gregans Castle are located in the parish, in the townlands of Gregan West and Gregan East, respectively.

== Townlands and hamlets ==
The parish contains the townlands of Ballyallaban, Berneens, Burrenwee, Cahermacnaghten, Cahermacun, Cloonmartin, Cullaun, Cregavockoge, Croagh North, Croagh South, Donnyvardan, Drumbrickaun, Faunarooska, Feenagh, Garracloon, Gleninsheen, Gragan East, Gragan West, Lisgoogan, Lislarheenmore, Lismacsheedy, Lismacteige, Lissylisheen, Poulacapple and Poulnabrucky. The hamlets in 1845 were Knockatun, Lissaroo, Cahirmacun and Croagh.
