= Cahermacnaghten =

Ringfort in County Clare, Ireland

- Cathair Mhic Neachtain
- Cahermacnaughten
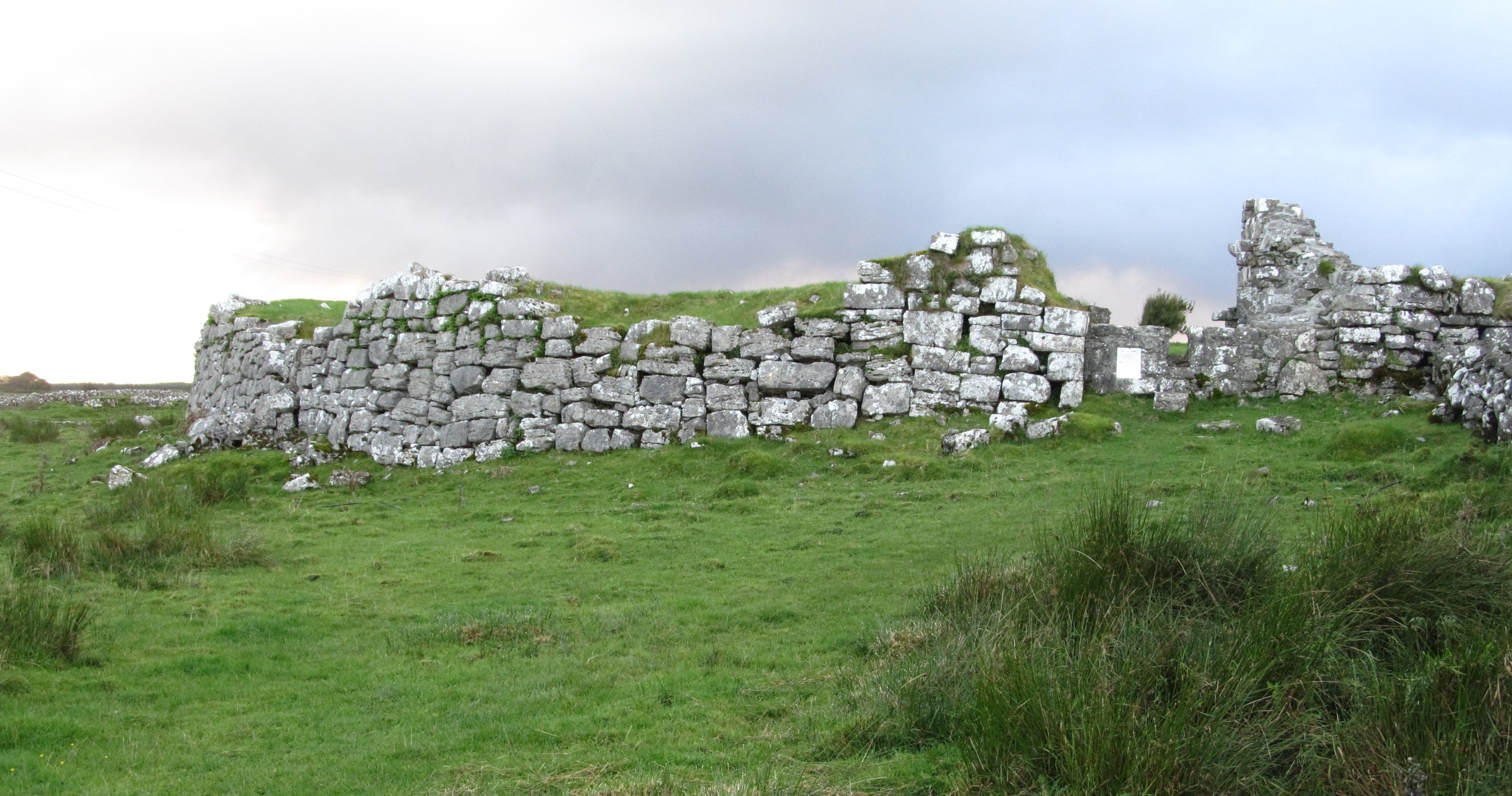

- Location within Ireland
- 53.0459°N 9.198°W
- Type: ringfort
- Location: Parish of Rathborney, the Burren
- Region: Ireland

Site notes
- Material: limestone
- Owner: public
- Public access: Yes (law school on private property)

National monument of Ireland
- Reference no.: 354

Cahermacnaghten (Irish: Cathair Mhic Neachtain) is a ringfort south of Ballyvaughan in the Burren area, in County Clare, Ireland. It, or a nearby building, is the site of the famous O'Davoran law school. The fort is a National Monument.

== Location ==
The fort lies right close to a road between the village of Ballyvaughan and Kilfenora. It is located in the townland of Cahermacnaghten in the civil parish of Rathborney.

== History ==
The O'Davorans were the hereditary lawyers (or brehons) of the O'Loghlen family, who styled themselves "Kings of the Burren" in the Middle Ages. Although it was long thought that their law school was located inside the cashel, it is now considered probable that the actual school was another ruined building 870 m to the southwest, known as Cabhail Tighe Breac. At the time the ringfort likely contained a residential building. This was the principal place (ceann áit) of the O'Davoran family.

Written evidence of the O'Davorans goes back at least to 1364 (Annals of Connaught). The ringfort was occupied at least into the 17th century, as a 1606 deed specifies the division of the property between two scions of the family.

== Description ==
The cashel has a diameter of around 100 feet. The interior floor is higher than the surrounding countryside, probably as a result of accumulated occupation debris. The interior contains five rectangular stone buildings.

An unusual two-storied 15th-century gatehouse gives access to the ringfort. Although it is now in a state of collapse, 19th- and early 20th-century descriptions and pictures are extant.

At least four other cashels, numerous enclosures and various old field walls fill the roughly 3 km long shallow valley running NE to SW. At the time, the area thus contained a large community and was more densely populated in the 16th and 17th centuries than it is now.

The probable law school building has been investigated by archaeologists since 2007. It is a single-storied stone building with three rooms and a loft overhead. It likely was built at the turn of the 16th century as a non-residential place. A recent excavation has turned up a piece of slate with a single character inscribed upon it, which may support the assumed use as a school.
