= Ballyvaughan (parish) =

Roman Catholic parish in County Clare, Ireland

- Roman Catholic parish
- Location in Ireland
- Coordinates: 53°06′56″N 9°08′58″W
- Country: Ireland
- Province: Munster
- County: County Clare

Government
  - Dáil Éireann: Clare
- Time zone: UTC+0 (WET)
  - Summer (DST): UTC-1 (IST (WEST))

Ballyvaughan parish is a Catholic parish in County Clare, Ireland, and part of the Kilfenora Deanery of the Roman Catholic Diocese of Galway, Kilmacduagh and Kilfenora. It is located in the northern side of The Burren, bordering Galway Bay. As of 2021, the parish priest was Richard Flanagan.

The parish is an amalgamation of the medieval parishes of Drumcreehy, Gleninagh, Killonaghan and Rathborney.

The main church of Ballyvaughan parish is the Church of Saint John the Baptist in Ballyvaughan, build and twice rebuild after damaging storms in the period 1858–1866. The second church of the parish is the Church of St. Patrick in Fanore. Building started in 1866 and dedication was in 1870.

In the former parish of Rathborney there are two church ruins within 500 m of each other, both in Croagh North townland. The older church is known as Rathborney Church, from Ráth Bhoirne (the Ráth of the Burren) and was built inside the remains of another ringfort. Most of the remains date to the 15th century, when a smaller earlier church was almost completely rebuilt. Parts of the east and north wall date to that original structure. A graveyard surrounds the church. Its presence and the fact that the original church was built before 1302 inside a ringfort may indicate a monastic origin for this site. The other is known as Glenaraha (Gleann na Ratha or Valley of the Ráths or Ringforts). It is a large t-shaped church with a vestry to the east. According to a sign in the west annexe, it was built in 1795 by the 1st Marquess of Buckinghham for use by his tenants. By 1837 the church had been enlarged and 40 acres of land allotted for use by the parish priest.

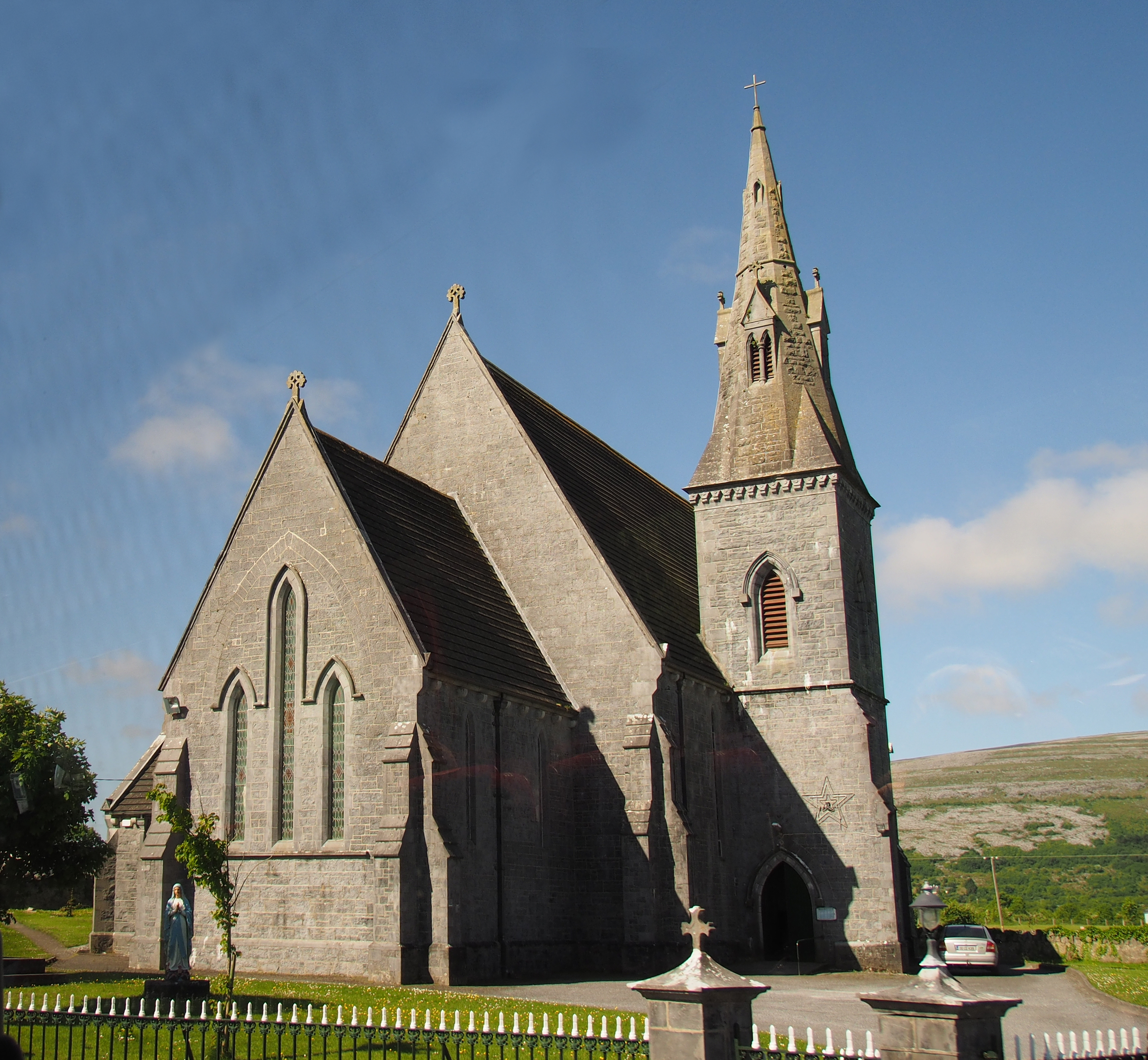
Church of Saint John the Baptist, Ballyvaughan

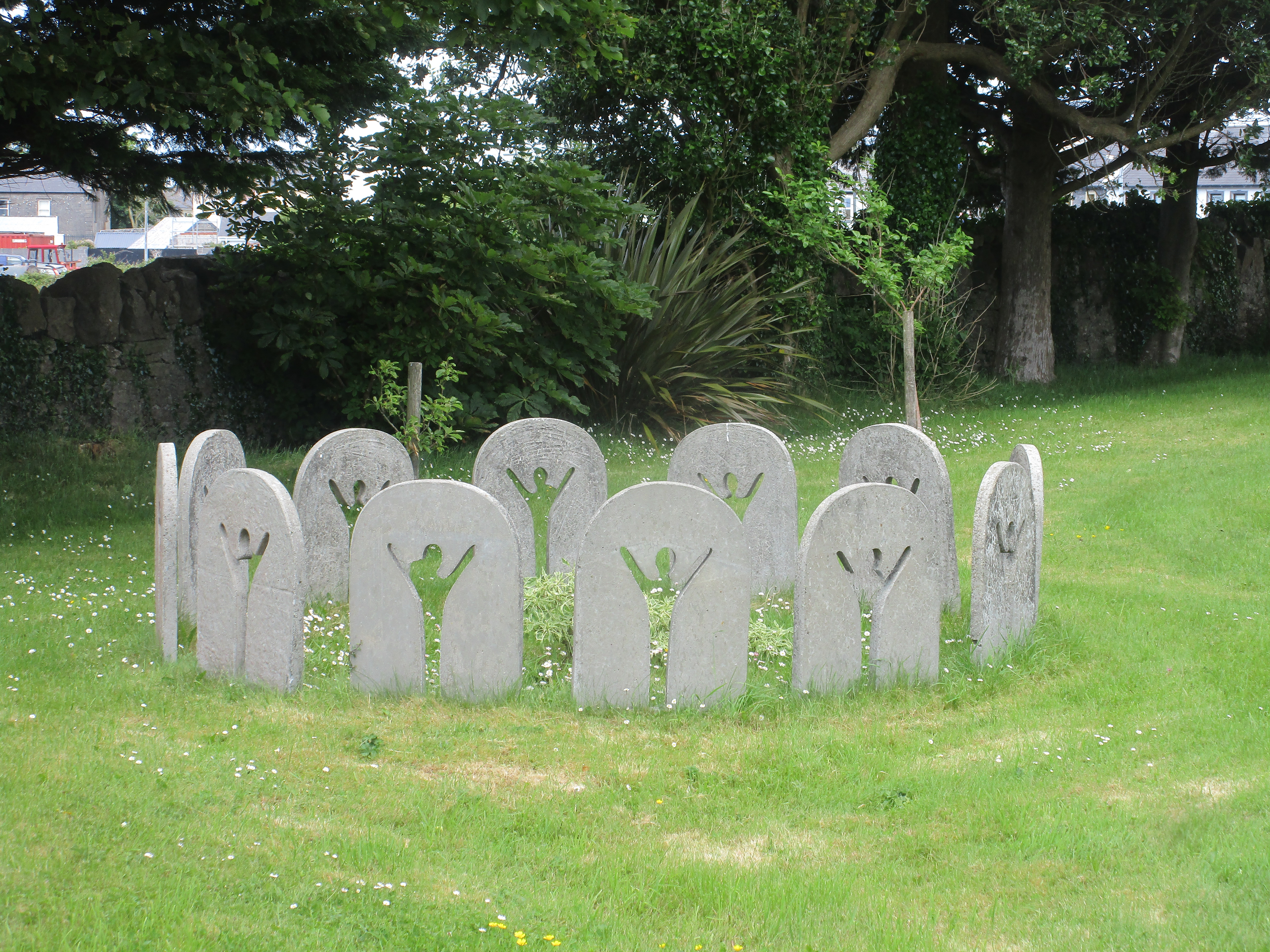
Stones of Gratitude in church yard in Ballyvaughan

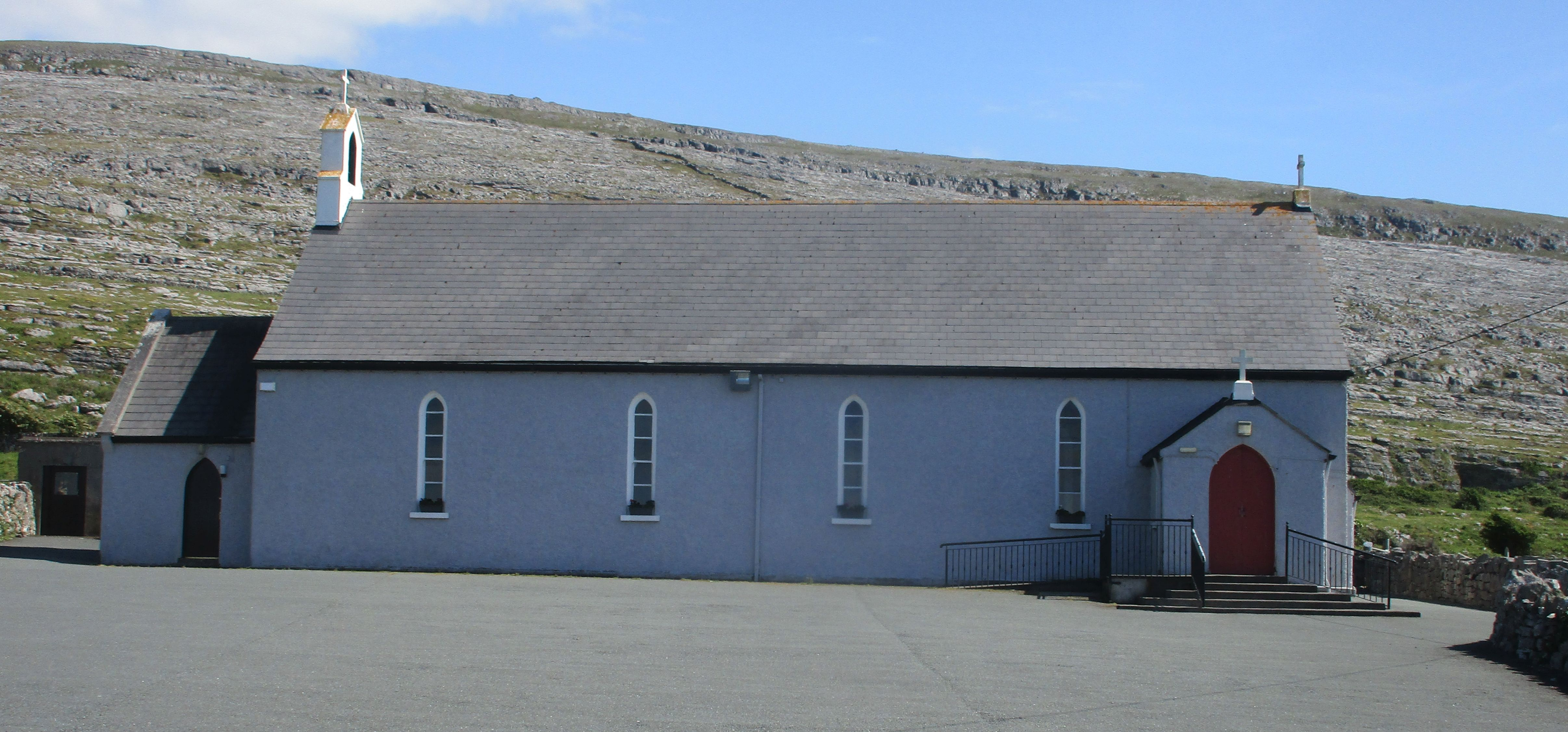
St. Patrick's Church, Fanore

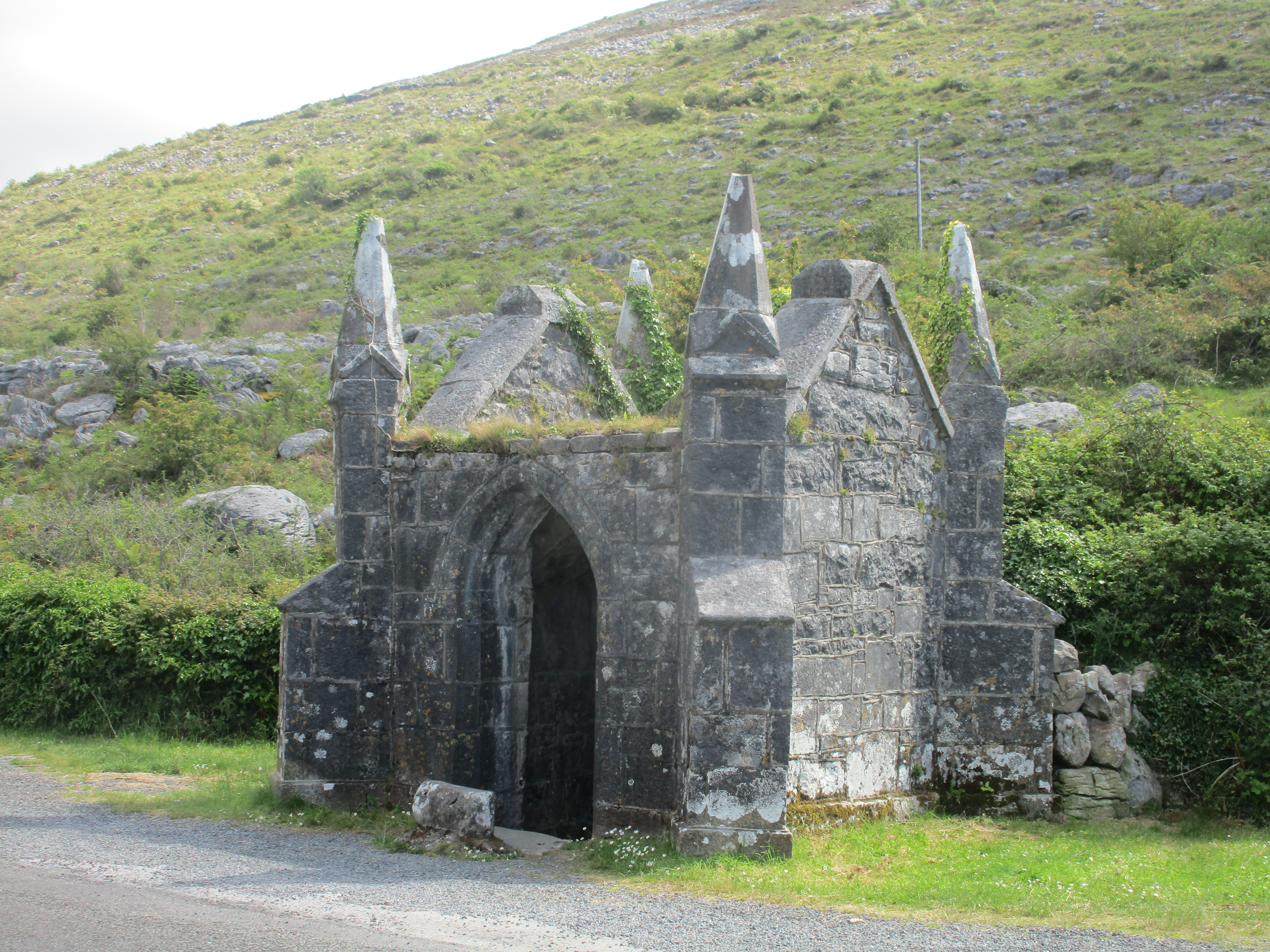
Tobercornan Well, holy well near Glenina

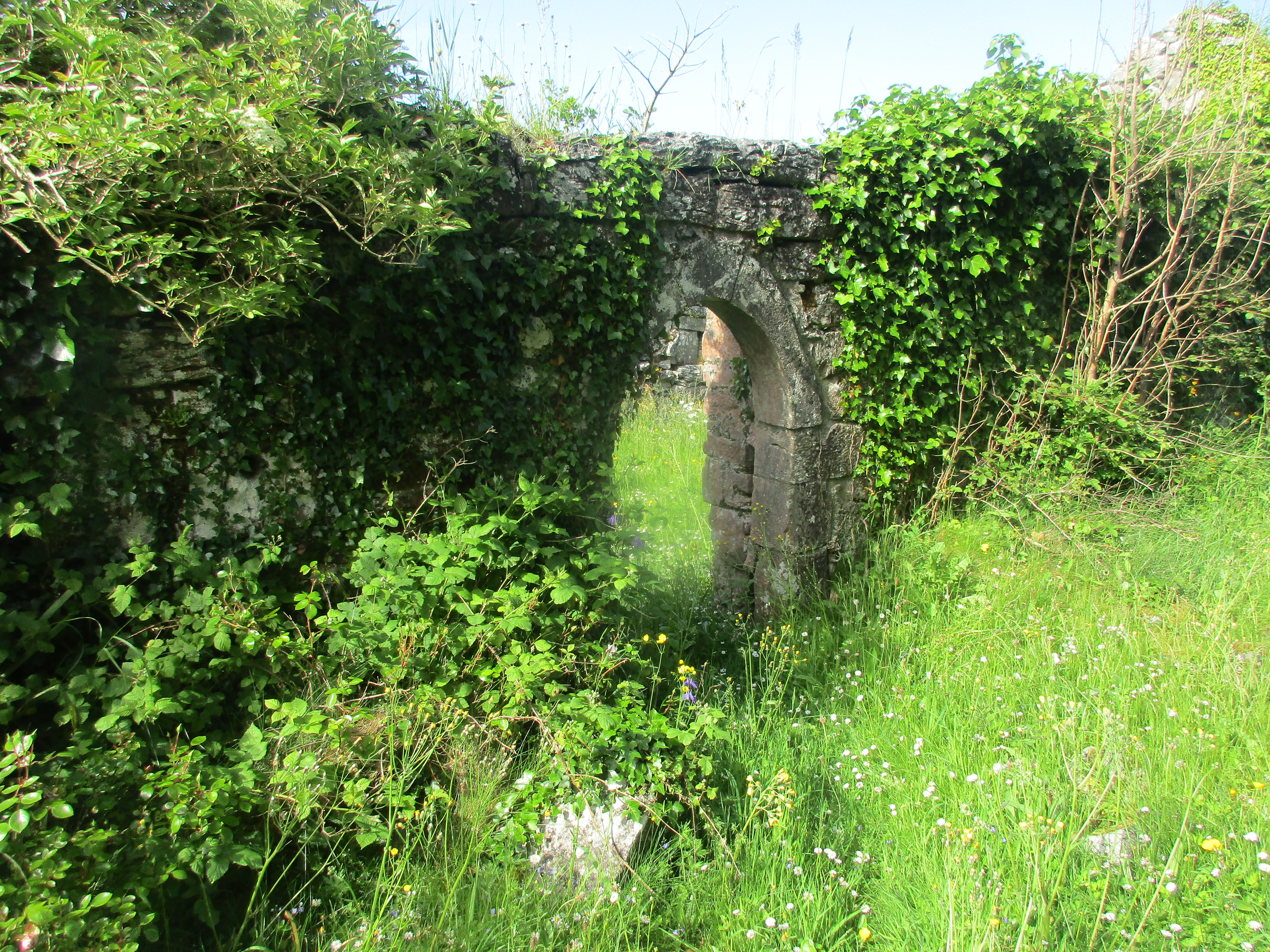
Entrance of the ruined Glenina Church

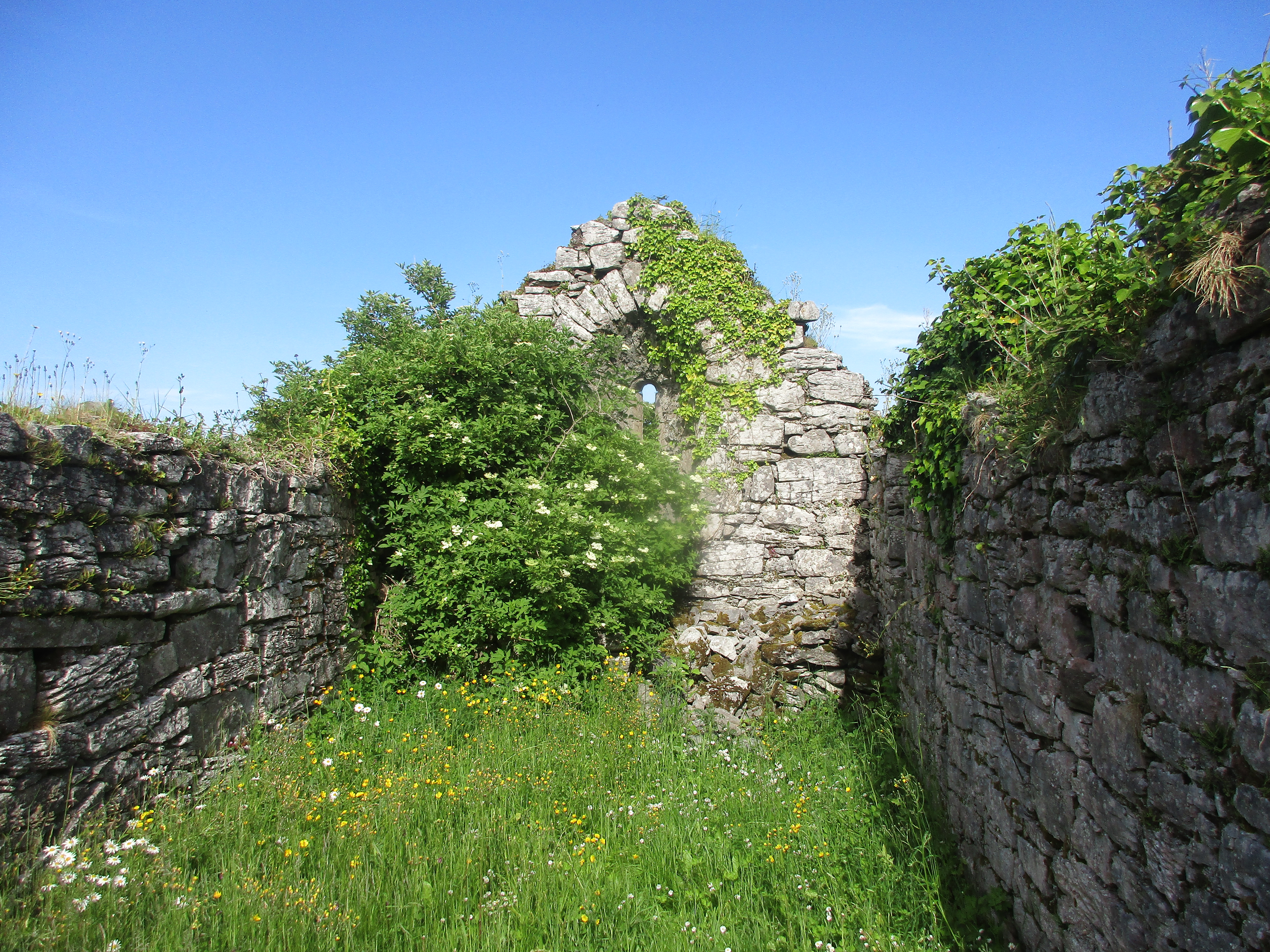
Inside of Glenina Church
