= Gleninagh =

Civil parish in County Clare, Ireland

Gleninagh Gleann Eidhneach
- Civil parish
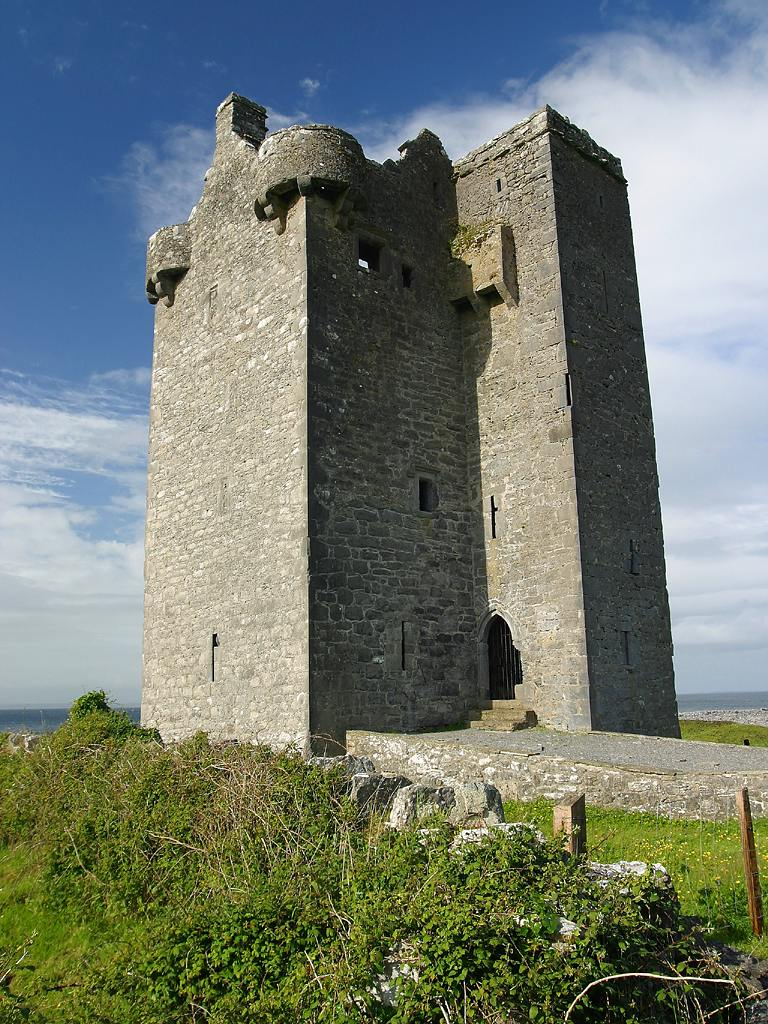
- Gleninagh Castle

- Location within Ireland
- Coordinates: 53°08′25″N 9°13′31″W
- Country: Ireland
- Province: Munster
- County: County Clare
- Time zone: UTC+0 (WET)
  - Summer (DST): UTC-1 (IST (WEST))

Designations

National monument of Ireland
- Official name: Gleninagh Castle
- Reference no.: 509

Gleninagh or Glaninagh (Irish: Gleann Eidhneach) is a civil parish in County Clare, Ireland. It lies in the extreme northwest of the Burren, on the south of the mouth of Galway Bay. It is known for the well-preserved L-plan Gleninagh Castle, a 16th-century tower house. The parish also contains the lighthouse on Black Head.

== Name ==
Gleann Eidhneach means the valley of ivy. However, it is possible that the correct Irish name is actually Cluain Eidhneach or "ivied retreat". The name predates the castle (see below). Parishes were often named after the principal church and this may be the case here.

== Location ==
The parish is in the northwest corner of the Barony of Burren. It is 13 miles (21 km) north of Ennistymon. The parish is 2 by 0.75 miles (3.22 by 1.21 km) and covers 4,292 acres (1,737 ha). It contains the bold cape of Black Head with its lighthouse, at the south side of the entrance to Galway bay. The land is broken and mountainous.

== Antiquities ==
=== Castle ===
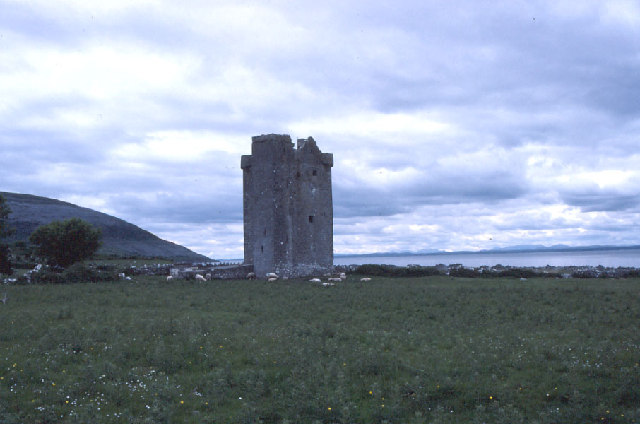
Gleninagh Castle

The 16th-century Gleninagh Castle, an L-shaped tower house, stands on a hillside looking out over Galway Bay.

It was an O'Loghlen (or O'Loughlin) stronghold from the early 16th century. Although it changed hands many times over the next centuries it was eventually regained by the family who used it until c. 1840. In 1839, it was described as "in good repair". A visitor in 1843 said the castle was being used as a barn by Mr. Blood, its proprietor. The upper part of the building was used as a dove-cot and abounded in pigeons.

The tower measures 31.8 feet (9.7 m) by 27.6 feet (8.4 m). In 1839 it was thatched with straw. There are four stories. The single square turret contains a spiral stairway. The entrance doorway on the first floor of the turret is protected by a machicolation high above. There are round bartizans in three of the main tower's corners. A number of window openings in the end wall were later closed (likely in the late 16th or early 17th century) so they could be used for fireplaces.

=== Church ===
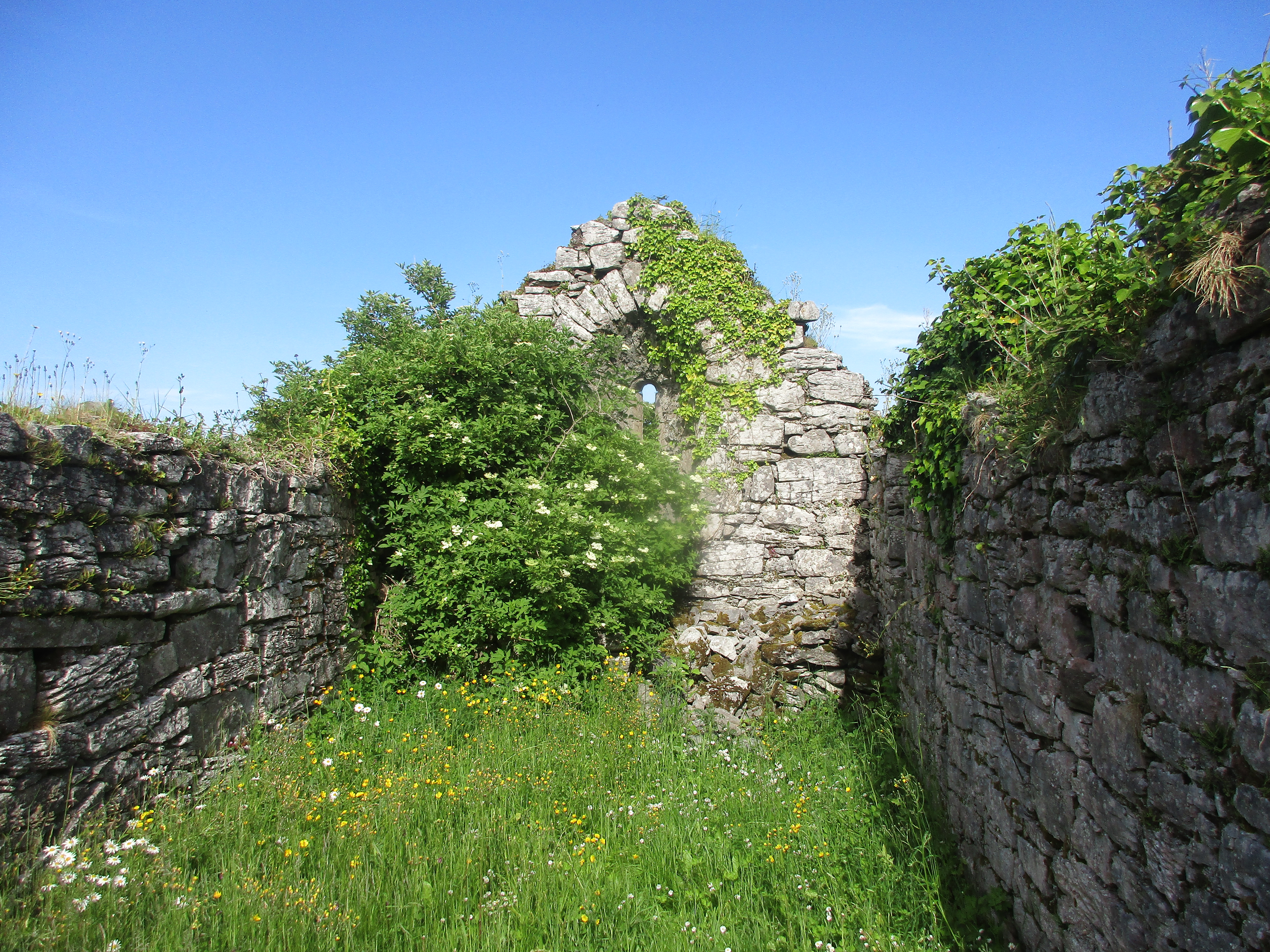
Interior of Gleninagh Church

The medieval church is of indeterminate age, but was in existence by 1302 (according to tax lists). There are some indications that the site may have been an earlier monastic settlement, such as a curved field wall shown on the 1842 OS map which could have been a remainder of a typical monastic enclosure wall. Domestic waste was discovered near the church and there are other signs of habitation such as outbuildings. Absent excavation, however, the age of the ecclesiastical site remains uncertain.

The church was described in 1839 as being mantled in thick ivy. The floor measured 38 by 13.33 feet (11.58 by 4.06 m). The walls were 2.5 feet (0.76 m) thick and about 8 feet (2.4 m) high. The south wall had a pointed doorway of cut stone that was 5.33 feet (1.62 m) high, measured to the vertex of the arch, and 3.1 feet (0.94 m) wide. The south wall had two windows, one quadrangular and the other round-topped, both fairly recent. There was a window in the east gable about 8 feet (2.4 m) high and 3.66 feet (1.12 m) wide. In the outside the window opening was 5.5 inches (140 mm).

As of 1897, the church was in a good state of preservation.

Today, though in poor repair, it is accessible to the public by a footpath from the road. The church is small for a parish church, which probably reflects the small population and poverty of the area which may well have been the poorest parish of the diocese of Kilfenora.

=== Gleninagh Lodge ===
The partially overgrown remains of this structure lie at the end of the lane connecting the road to the tower house. Mid-19th century maps show a substantial assembly of large buildings. The estate included a large formal garden south of the holy well. At the time, most of the land in this area was owned by the lodge's proprietor, William Bindon Blood, a descendant of Colonel Thomas Blood, who tried to steal the English Crown Jewels in 1671.

=== Others ===
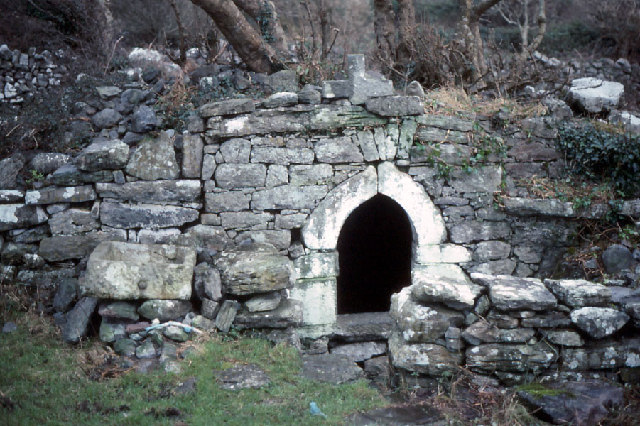
Tobar na Croiche Naoimhe (Well of the Holy Cross)

Near the castle is a holy well dedicated to the Holy Cross, which has many recorded names (Tobar na Croiche Naoimh, Croghneva, Tobar na Croise Naomhtha, Tobernacrobaneede etc.). The well has a little stone vault over it, with a Gothic-type arch and a cross on top. It was thought that performing stations at the well would help with problems with the eyes. In the early 1840s the votive offerings were reported to include human skulls. At least until that period the well was a destination for pilgrims.

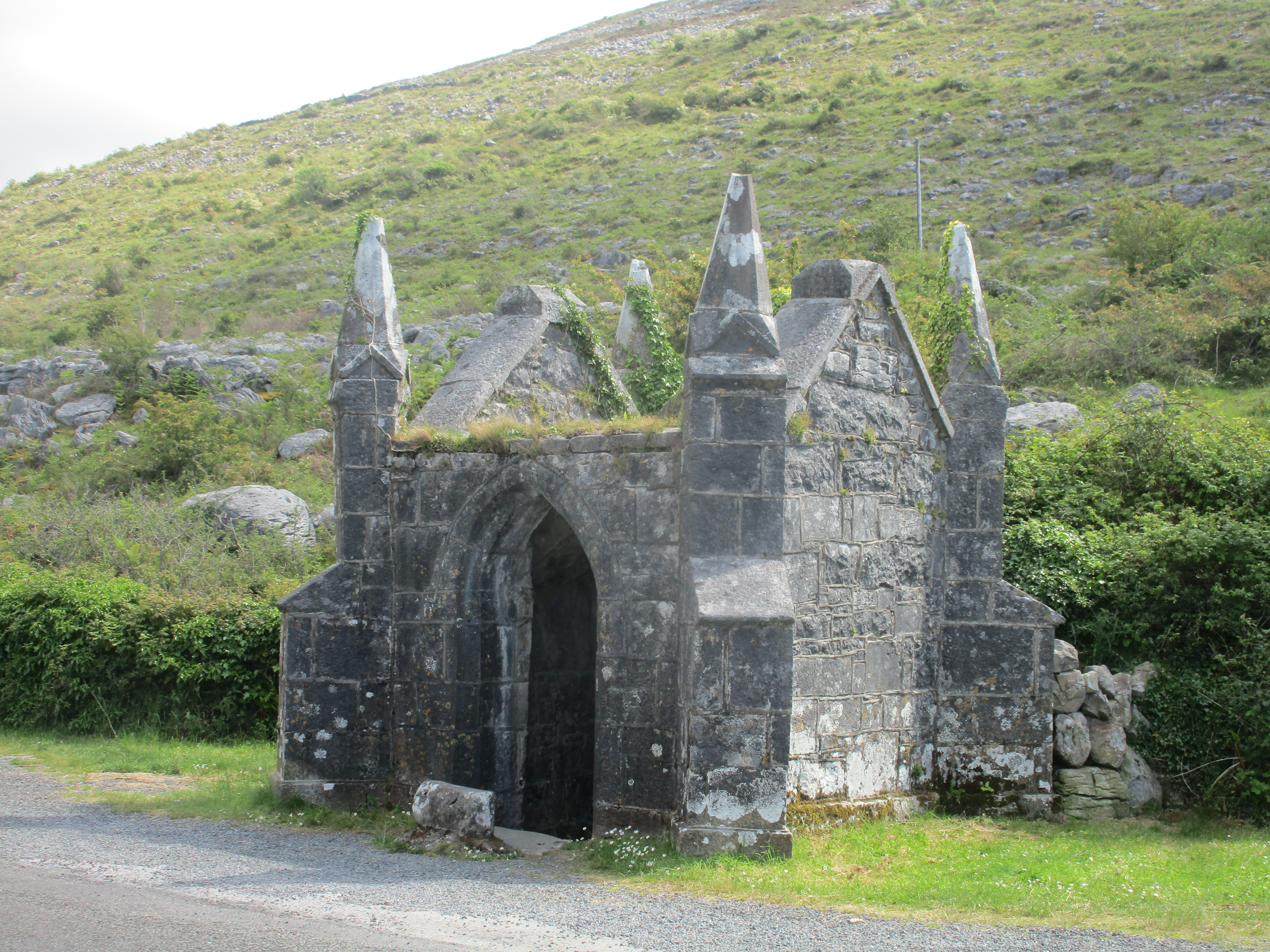
Tobar Cornain

Another well called Tobar Cornain (or Tobercornan) is in the townland of Gleninagh North. This is today covered by a Gothic Revival well house (c. 1860) and lies right next to the road.

There is a large heap of stones called Dough Branneen ("the heap of little Bran") in the townland of Aughaglinny. There is a stone ringfort called Caher doon Fergus in the townland of Murroogh with caves underneath it, said to be haunted.

East of the castle is a lime kiln, previously thought to be a Fulacht Fiadh.

== History ==
In 1544 King Henry VIII of England granted Gleninagh to Richard Harding. The castle was owned by James Lynch of Galway in 1570. The lands of Gleninagh were owned by the see of Kilfenora in 1629.

In 1837 a parish was in the Catholic union or district of Glyn, or Glenarraha. The population in 1841 was 886 in 146 houses. In 1845 the main settlements were the villages of Glaninagh, Murroghkelly and Murroghwohy.

== Townlands ==
Townlands are Aghaglinny North, Aghaglinny South, Gleninagh North, Gleninagh South, Murrooghkilly, Murrooghtoohy North and Murrooghtoohy South.

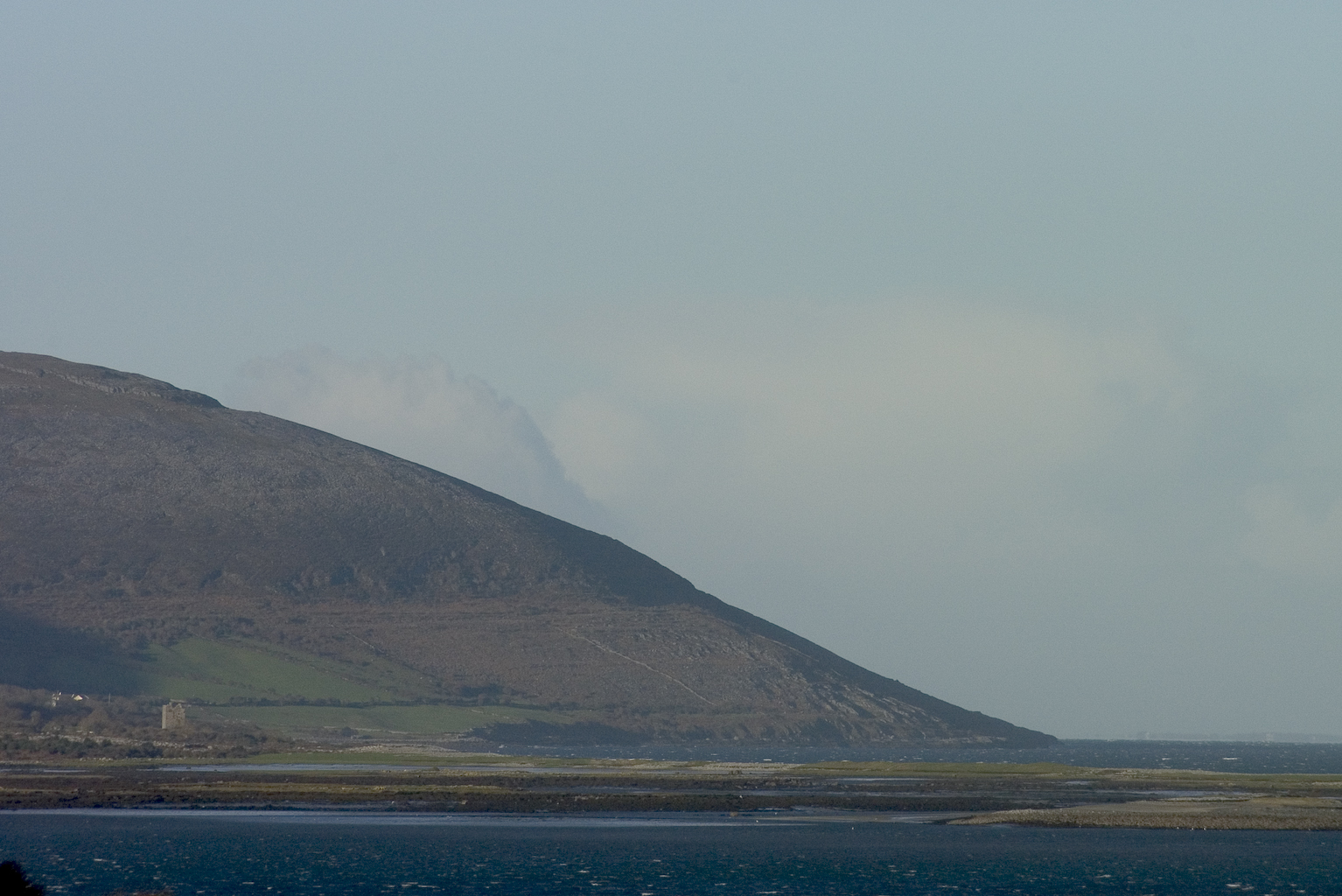
Black Head

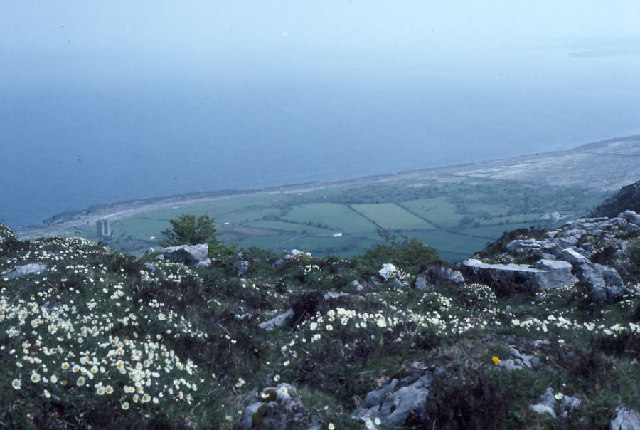
View from the saddle in Gleninagh South looking over Galway Bay, with Gleninagh Castle near the coast to the left

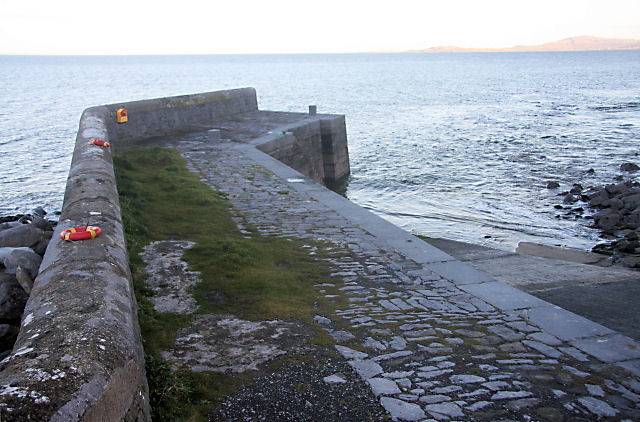
Coolsiva Quay

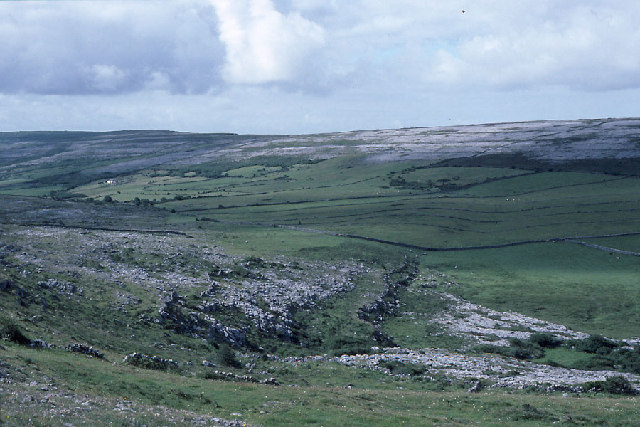
The valley of Gleninagh about Feenagh
