= Gleninsheen (wedge tomb) =

Gleninsheen wedge tombs
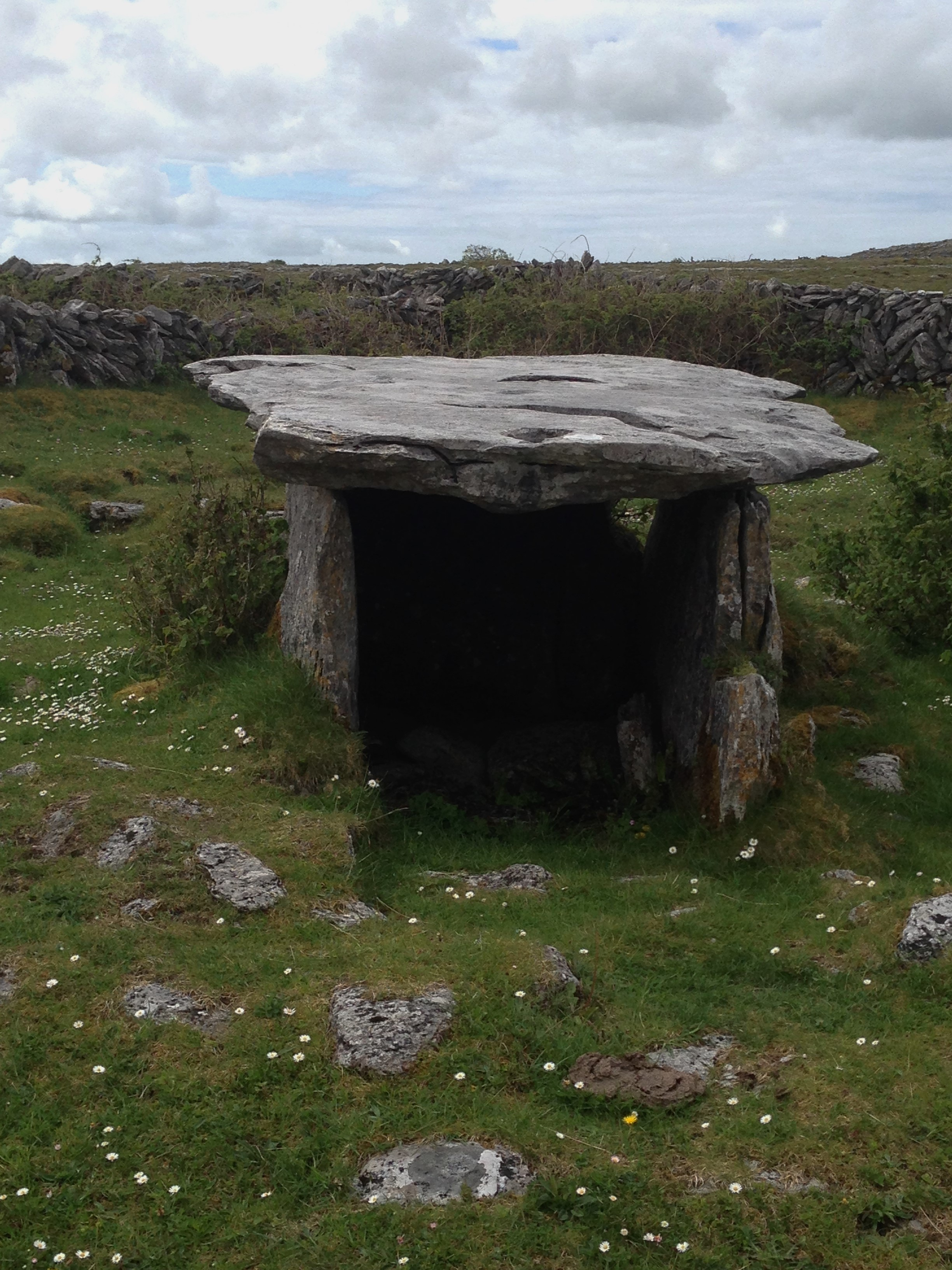
- One of the Gleninsheen wedge tombs in 2016

- Location within Ireland
- 53.064°N 9.1494°W
- Type: Wedge tomb
- Periods: late Neolithic/early Bronze Age
- Location: Rathborney, The Burren
- Region: Ireland

Site notes
- Owner: on private property
- Public access: Yes

The Gleninsheen wedge tombs are two prehistoric wedge tombs located in the north central area of the Burren area of County Clare, Ireland. Both are aligned east-west, and there is evidence of contemporary etchings on some of the stone.

== Location ==
The tombs are located on private property in the townland of Gleninsheen, parish of Rathborney, not far from the N480 road. One is located right next to the road. The other, partially collapsed, is around 100 m to the northeast in a field.

They are among eighty wedge tombs still extant in Clare. The largest concentration of them is found on Roughan Hill near Kilnaboy.

In 1932, not far from the wedge tombs, a local man discovered the Gleninsheen gorget, a neck ornament dating from c. 800 to 700 BC, concealed in one of the limestone grykes. It is now on display at the National Museum of Ireland (Kildare Street site) in Dublin. It was number 12 in the semi-official list of A History of Ireland in 100 Objects.

== Description ==
The tombs are wedge-shaped in ground plan, with the widest part facing south west towards the setting sun like all tombs of this type. The setting sun is thus thought to have been of special significance to the builders.

No wedge tomb in the Burren has so far been excavated, but they are tentatively dated to 2300 to 2000 BC, the late Neolithic or early Bronze Age.

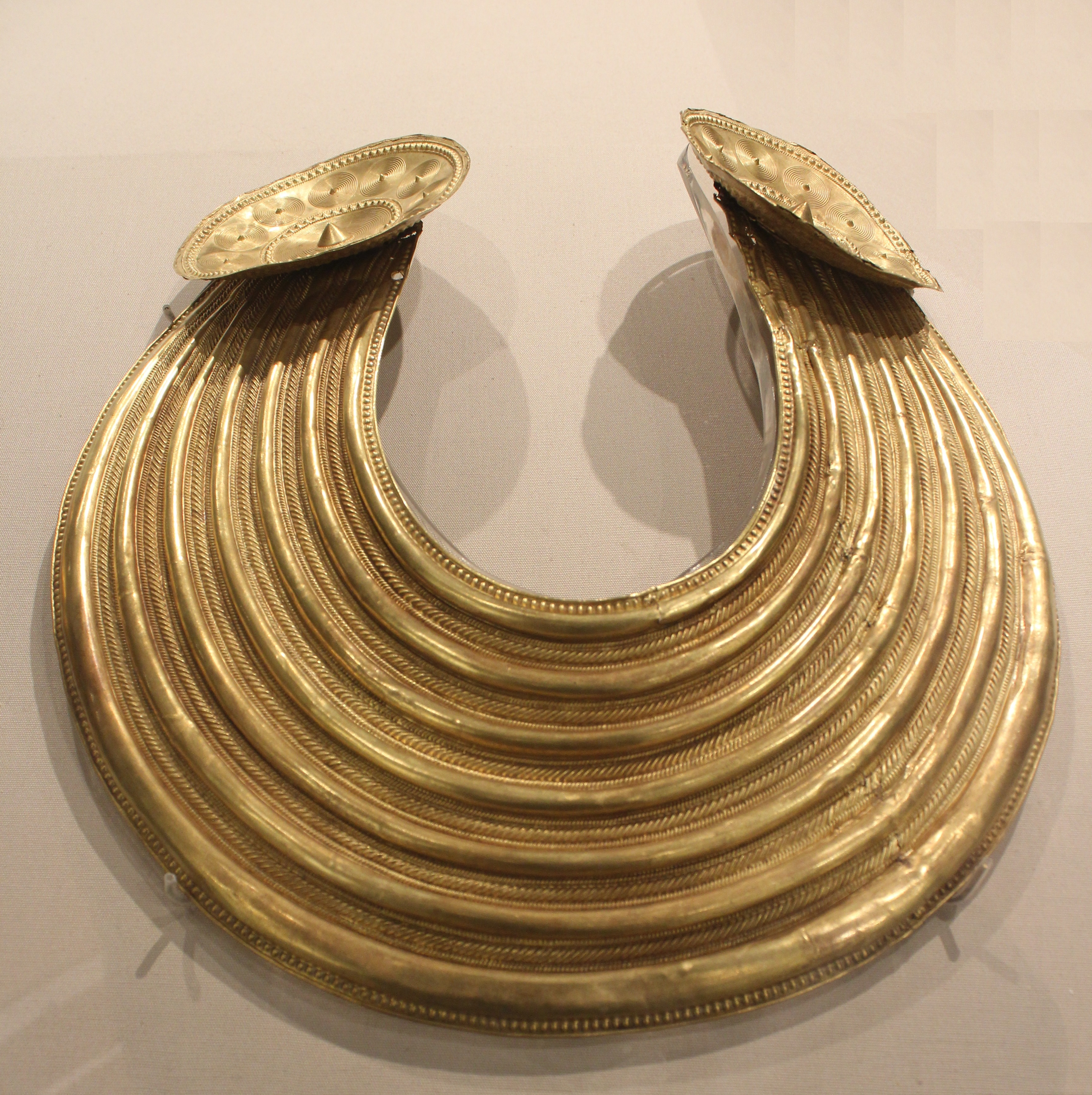
The Gleninsheen gorget, c. 800–700 BC, National Museum of Ireland

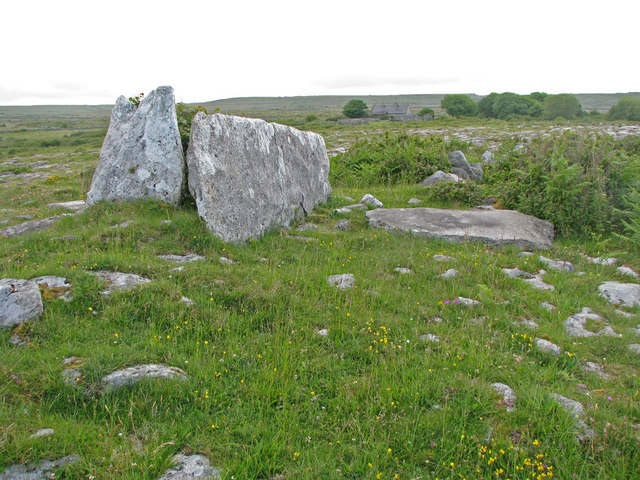
The partially collapsed northern wedge tomb

== Sources ==
- Gibbons, Michael. "Rock Art in County Clare". Archaeology Ireland, 2007.
