= Murroogh =

Hamlet in County Clare, Ireland

Murroogh Muiriúch Tuaithe
- Hamlet
- Location in Ireland
- Coordinates: 53°08′00″N 9°16′30″W
- Country: Ireland
- Province: Munster
- County: County Clare
- Time zone: UTC+0 (WET)
  - Summer (DST): UTC-1 (IST (WEST))

Murroogh (Irish: Muiriúch Tuaithe), sometimes named Murrooghtoohy or Murroghtwohy, is a hamlet in County Clare, Ireland. It covers the townlands of Murrooghtoohy North and Murrooghtoohy South. It is within the civil parish of Gleninagh, in the Barony of Burren. The area was officially classified as part of the West Clare Gaeltacht; an Irish-speaking community, until 1956.

== See also ==
- List of towns and villages in Ireland
