= Gleninsheen gorget =

Bronze Age gold collar from Ireland

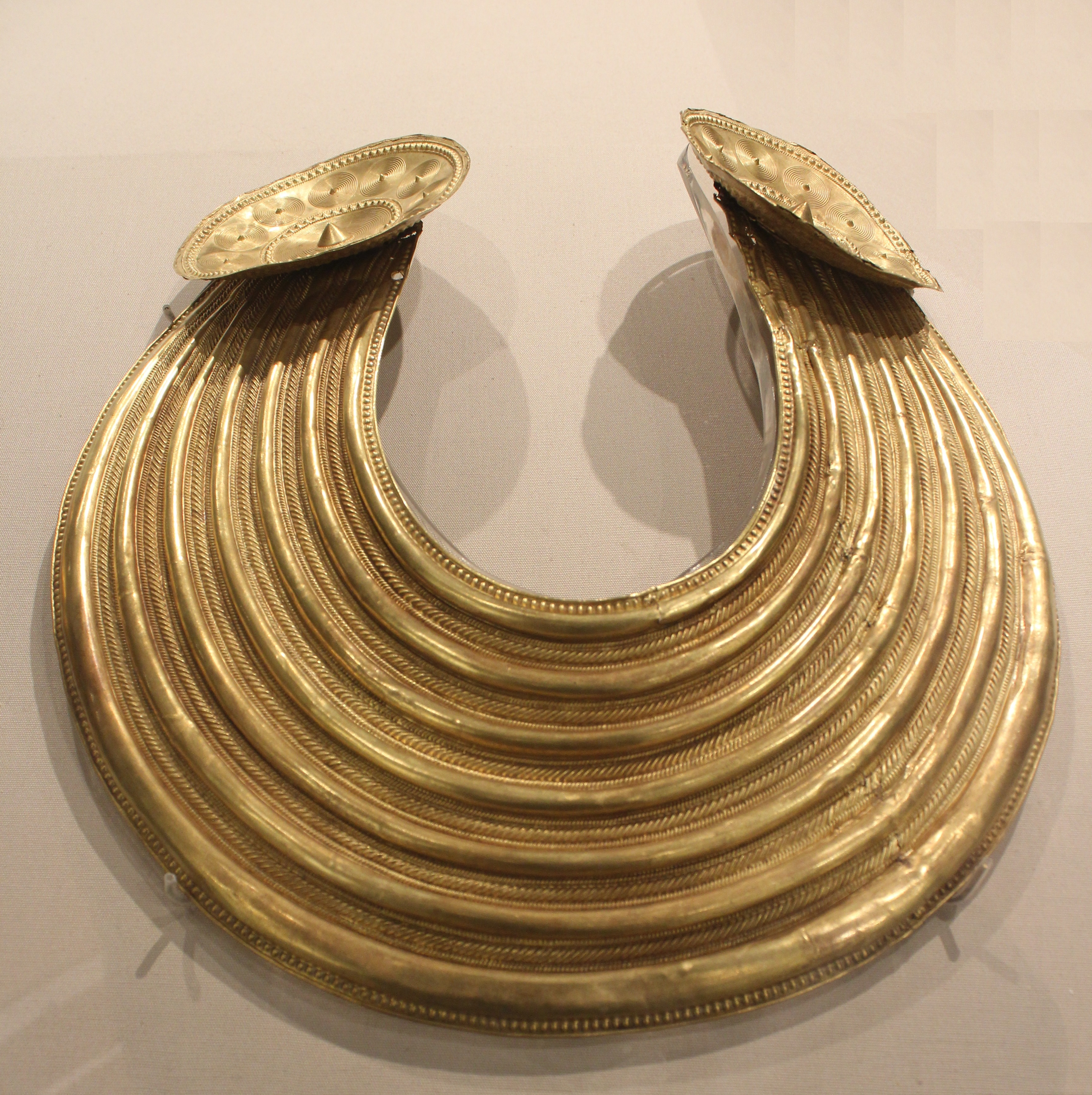
- Gleninsheen gorget
- Material: gold
- Size: width 31.4cm
- Created: 800–700 BC
- Discovered: January 1930; Gleninsheen, County Clare, Ireland
- Present location: National Museum of Ireland, Dublin

The Gleninsheen gorget (catalogued as NMI W21) is a late Bronze Age collar, found in 1930 in the Gleninsheen region of the Burren, County Clare, Ireland. Given that the gorget (a type of large collar or necklace) is made from gold and weighs 276 g (8.9 ozt) it must have been intended as an ornament for a high-ranking warrior. Dated to c. 800–700 BC, it is one of the earliest examples of substantial Irish goldwork, although the gorget may represent a development of the much earlier and lighter gold lunula form. Both are mainly found in Ireland.

When found, it had been placed in a rock cleft and, like a number of similar Irish gold collars, was folded in half, probably as part of a "decommissioning" process. When this happened is unknown.

It is in the collection of the National Museum of Ireland (NMI), Kildare Street, Dublin, and appeared as number 12 in the 2011 semi-official list of a History of Ireland in 100 Objects.

== Description ==
The Gleninsheen example is one of nine such surviving gold gorgets, one of the few that remain intact, and perhaps the most important. Like other Irish gold collars, it bears a European influence, when similar objects were widely produced to be worn by elite warrior-kings. Because of its high value, it was likely only used for ceremonial purposes.

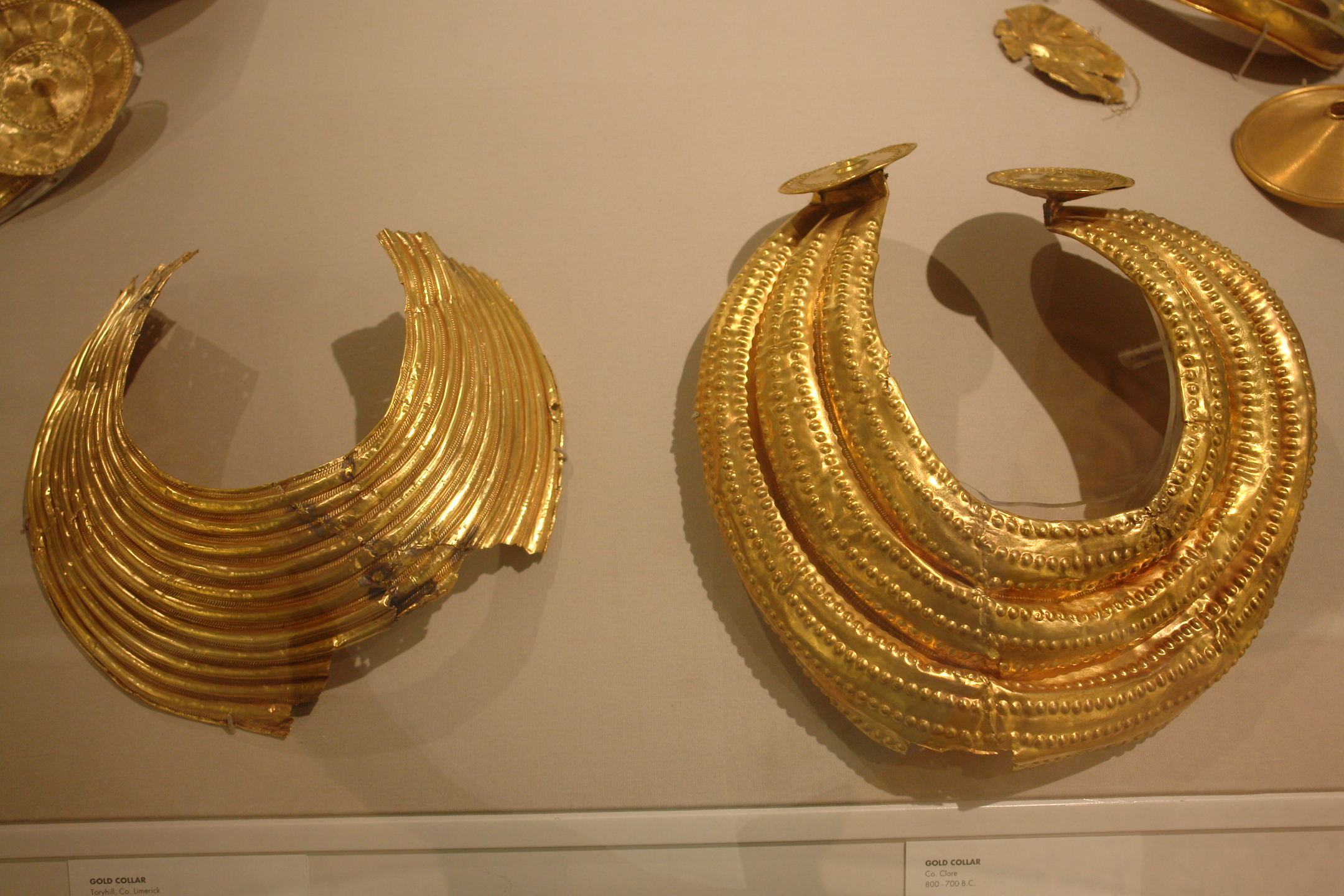
Gold collars on display at the National Museum of Ireland. To the left is the Borrisnoe collar.

The U-shaped collar comprises seven gold ribs and two attached terminals formed as gold discs. The ribs are plain, while the intervening rows are decorated with rope mouldings. This format of concentric ornament working outwards from a central boss is in keeping with most extant late Bronze Age gorgets. Like most examples, the most detailed and complex patterns are on the high-relief work on the front sides of the two gold discs on the terminals, each of which contains large central conical bosses. In contrast, the designs on the reverse sides of the discs are unfinished.

It contains holes at either side, so that a cord or light chain could be attached for holding it around the back of the neck.

Described as a "technical and artistic achievement at the apex of goldworking in the Europe of its time", it is decorated with various designs including concentric circles, both conical and round bosses, and rope patterns. These are achieved using a combination of incision and repousse techniques.

== Discovery ==
The gorget was found in January 1932 in the Burren, County Clare by local Patrick (Paddy) Nolan while out rabbit shooting. His dog cornered a rabbit in a rock fissure, and when Nolan went to the spot, he discovered the object, which had been folded in two. Unsure of what he had discovered, Nolan took the "queer looking thing" to his uncle who, believing it to be an ancient coffin mounting, would not allow it in his house. In 1934, Nolan showed it to historian Dermot Gleeson who identified it correctly as a Bronze Age gold collar.

While no other objects were discovered at the find spot, it is an area otherwise rich in pre-Christian history, and contains a number of stone circles, dolmens and the two Gleninsheen wedge tombs. Typical of the Burren, the immediate area is mostly of limestone, and was described in 1651 by the Cromwellian Army officer Edmund Ludlow as not having "wood enough to hang a man, water enough to drown him, or earth enough to bury him".

== See also ==
- Blessington lunula

== Sources ==
- Cahill, Mary. "John Windele's golden legacy—prehistoric and later gold ornaments from Co. Cork and Co. Waterford". Proceedings of the Royal Irish Academy, volume 106C, 2006. JSTOR 40657880
- Cahill, Mary. "Ornaments: Cuirass to Gorget? An Interpretation of the Structure and Decorative Elements of Some Gold Ornaments from the Irish Late Bronze Age". Archaeology Ireland, volume 19, No. 4, Winter, 2005. JSTOR 20559099
- Cahill, Mary. "Before the Celts: treasures in gold and bronze". In: Ó Floinn, Raghnal; Wallace, Patrick (eds), Treasures of the National Museum of Ireland: Irish Antiquities. National Museum of Ireland, 2002. ISBN 978-0-7171-2829-7
- Gleeson, Dermot. "Discovery of Gold Gorget at Burren, Co. Clare". The Journal of the Royal Society of Antiquaries of Ireland, Seventh Series, volume 4, no. 1, 30 June 1934. JSTOR 25513720
- Grant, Christine. "Heritage Guide No. 49: The Burren in prehistory". Archaeology Ireland, June 2010. JSTOR 40661509
- Kelly, Eamonn P. "Treasures of Ireland: Catalogue entries, Late Bronze Age and Iron Age Antiquities". Treasures of Ireland: Irish Art 3000 BC – 1500 AD. Dublin: Royal Irish Academy, 1983
- Waddell, John. The Prehistoric Archaeology of Ireland. Galway: Galway University Press, 1998
