= Ballyallaban ringfort =

Earthen ringfort in County Clare, Ireland

- An Rath
- Doon
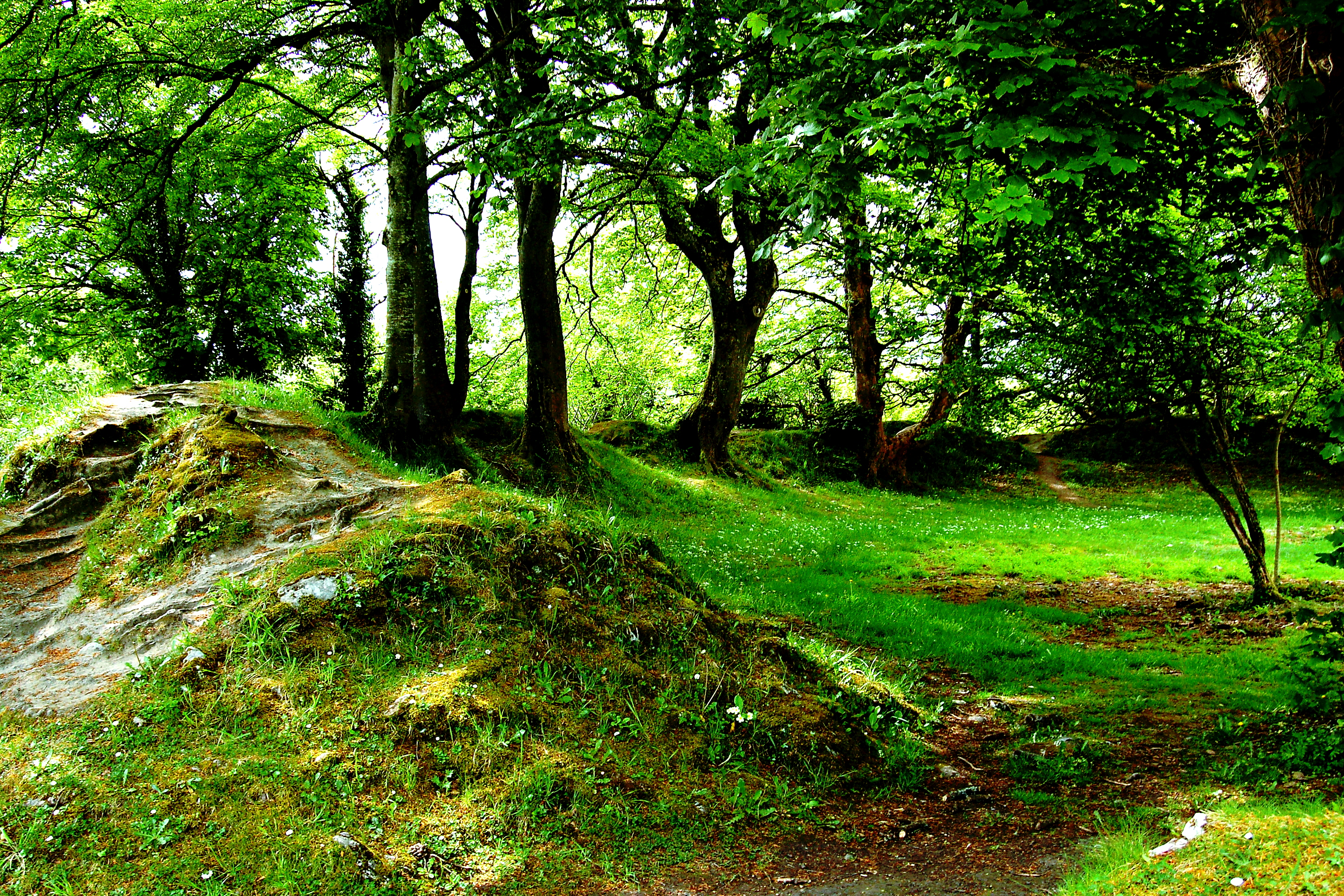

- Location within Ireland
- 53.09005°N 9.158578°W
- Type: Ringfort
- Periods: unknown but likely early Medieval
- Location: Parish of Rathborney, the Burren
- Region: Ireland

Site notes
- Material: earth
- Public access: Yes

National monument of Ireland
- Reference no.: 648

Ballyallaban ringfort (Irish: Baile Albóin) or sometimes An Rath ("The Rath") is an earthen ringfort south of Ballyvaughan in the Burren area, in County Clare, Ireland. It is a National Monument.

== Location ==
The fort lies right next to the R480 road between the village of Ballyvaughan and Leamaneh Castle. It is located in the townland of Ballyallaban, in the civil parish of Rathborney.

== Description ==
The ringfort has an internal diameter of around 100 feet (200 feet including the moat) and is in good condition, although trees grow on much of the structure. The ramparts were built with the earth dug out of the moat, which still fills with water after rain.

The walls were originally even higher, and the moat deeper, than they are now. The embankment was most likely topped by a wooden palisade.

== Designation ==
The national monument including Ballyallaban ringfort, number 648, actually consists of two separate forts: the earthen Ballyallaban ringfort, and the nearby stone fort of Cahermore.
