= Gregans Castle =

Tower house and Georgian house, County Clare, Ireland

Coordinates: 53°4′36.36″N 9°11′3.56″W

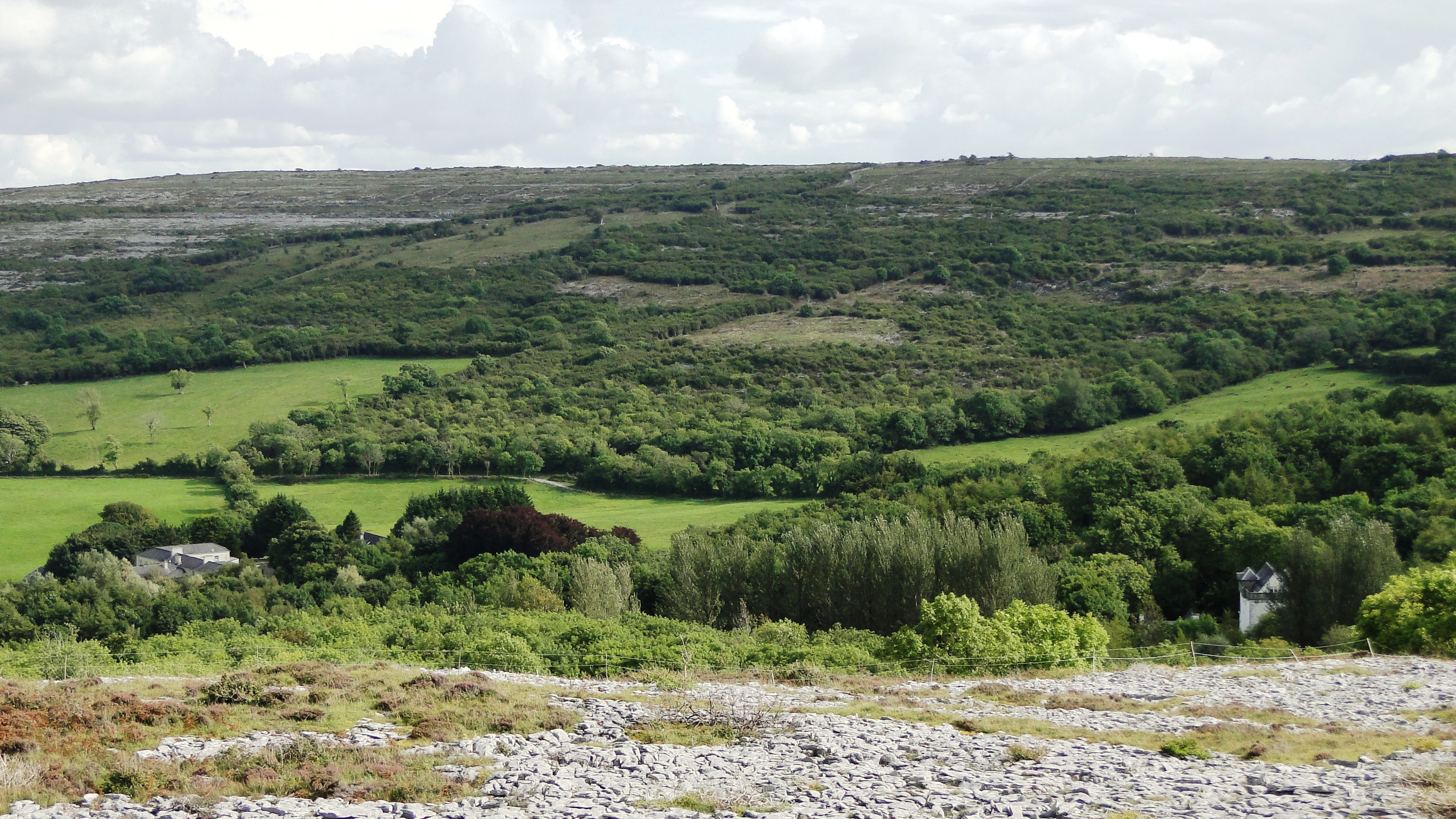
View south from the hill overlooking Gregan East, with the restored tower house (now a private residence) on the right and the hotel on the left

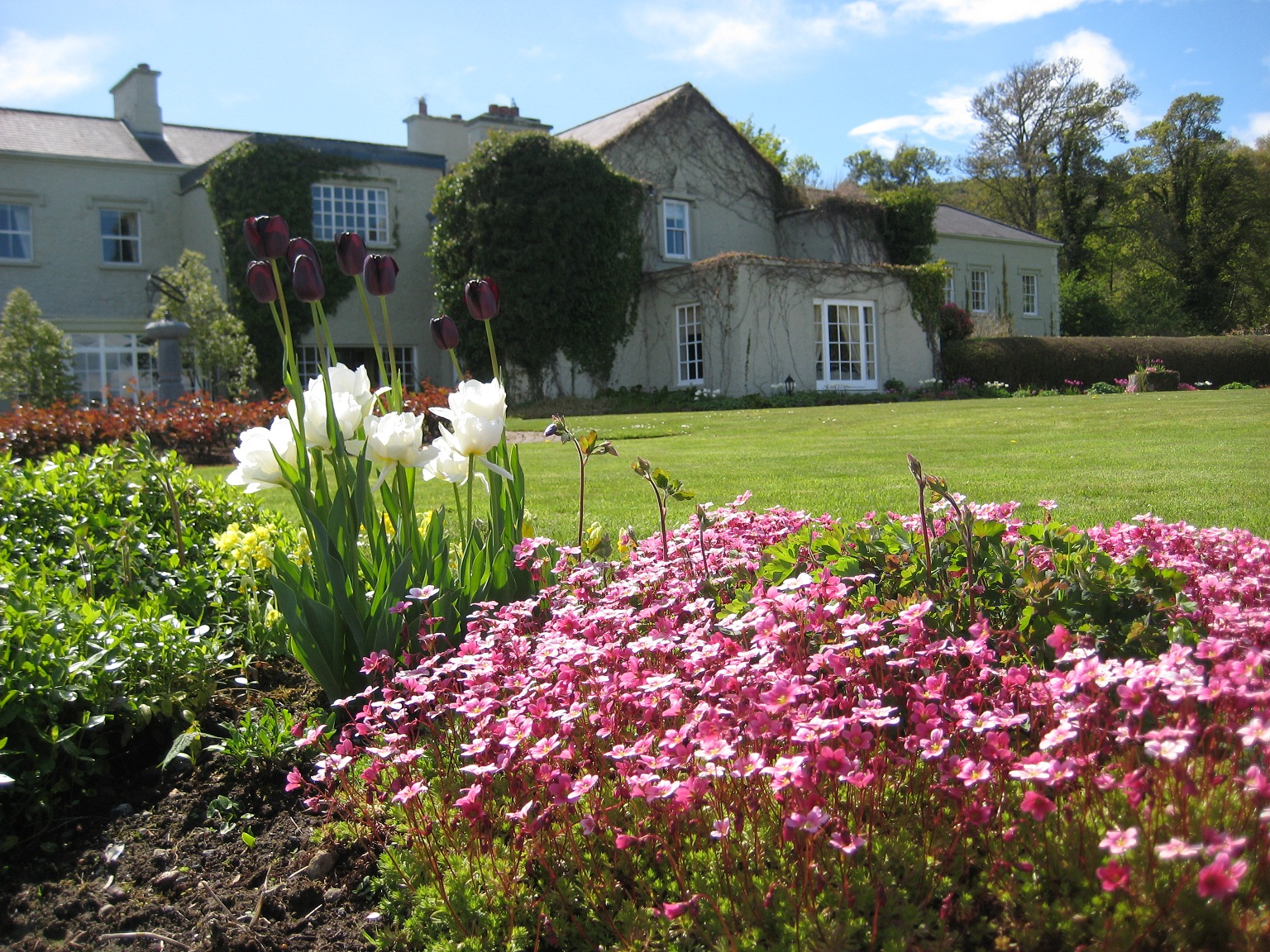
The house as it is today.

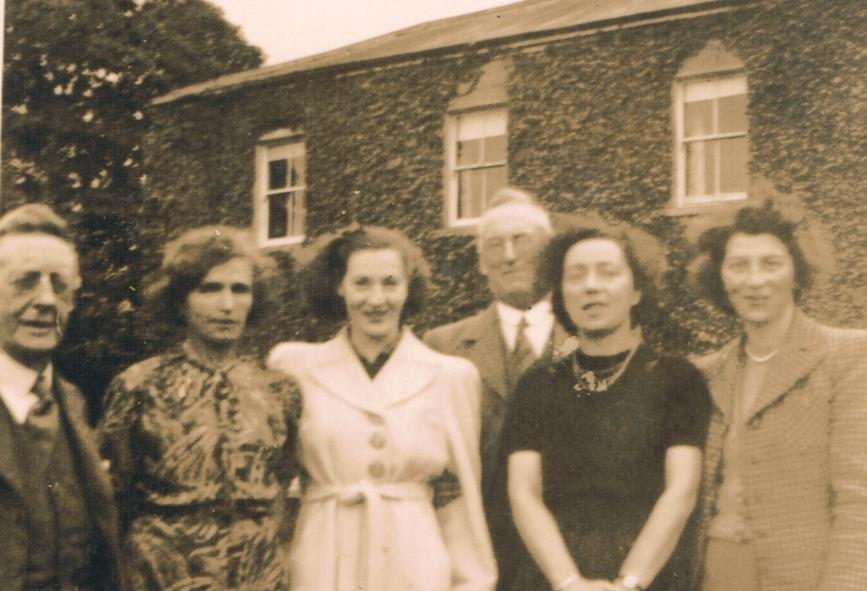
J.R.R. Tolkien at Gregans Castle in 1954 with owner Frank Martyn and his partner Suzette Crowe

Gregans Castle is the name applied to both a 15th-century tower house and a Georgian-style house in the Burren region of County Clare, Ireland, near the village of Ballyvaughan. The latter dates from 1750 and is associated with the Martyn and O'Lochlainn (or O'Loughlen) families. The tower house is across the road from the modern house, which is now a hotel.

== Location ==
Gregans Castle lies in the Ballyvaughan valley of the Burren, a unique region that contains grey limestone terraces, a very high concentration of alpine, mediterranean and arctic flowers, particularly orchids, ancient burial tombs, stone forts and ecclesiastical ruins.

== History ==
The 15th/16th-century tower house was the seat of the chief of the O'Lochlainn (or O'Loughlen) family, called the "Prince of Burren". Until the end of the 16th century the area was referred to as "the Barony of Gragans" (probably derived from the word for mountain bog, an area of which is present on the hills to the west of the castle).

Owney More O'Loughlen was proprietor of Gregans in 1641. In the Cromwellian Settlement which came after 1654, he was dispossessed. The land was then granted to the Martyn family. It is unclear, however, whether the lands did leave the O'Loughlen family: In 1632, Turlough O'Loughlen had married Alice Martyn, daughter of George Martyn (Mayor of Galway 1632-1633), and it was their son, George Oge, using the name Martyn, to whom the lands were granted. (Though according to the Martyn family genealogy by Martin J. Blake, George Oge was the eldest son George Martyn, Mayor of Galway.)

Apparently the Martyns built another fortified structure near the old tower house, rather than using the existing tower house. Eventually, they moved to the two-storey house at the location of today's hotel. An early member of the Martyn family is recorded as having been killed at the Battle of Aughrim in 1691 at the end of the Jacobite wars. Later the family were prominent in the legal profession and lived mainly in Dublin. The house at Gregans seems to have been retained as a summer retreat in later years and most of the 2,000 acres (8.1 km^{2}) of land were let.

In 1866, after contracting a most profitable marriage, Capt. John Gregory Martyn J.P., came to live permanently at Gregans. Capt. Martyn was a supporter of Charles Stewart Parnell and Home Rule for Ireland. The house was extended considerably at this time. After his death, his son Francis Florence Martyn remained at Gregans and farmed a much reduced estate. During these times of economic depression, the house fell into some disrepair and the unmarried Frank, locally thought of as an eccentric, died in 1956. In fact, in the 1940s, Frank even tried his hand at inn-keeping and obtained a bar license. After he died, his housekeeper, Miss Crowe continued to live in the house and eventually, the trustees sold the house for conversion to a hotel.

The oldest surviving feature of the house is the former kitchen fireplace with crest keystone in what is now the Martyn Suite. In 1967 the house opened as Gregans Castle Hotel.

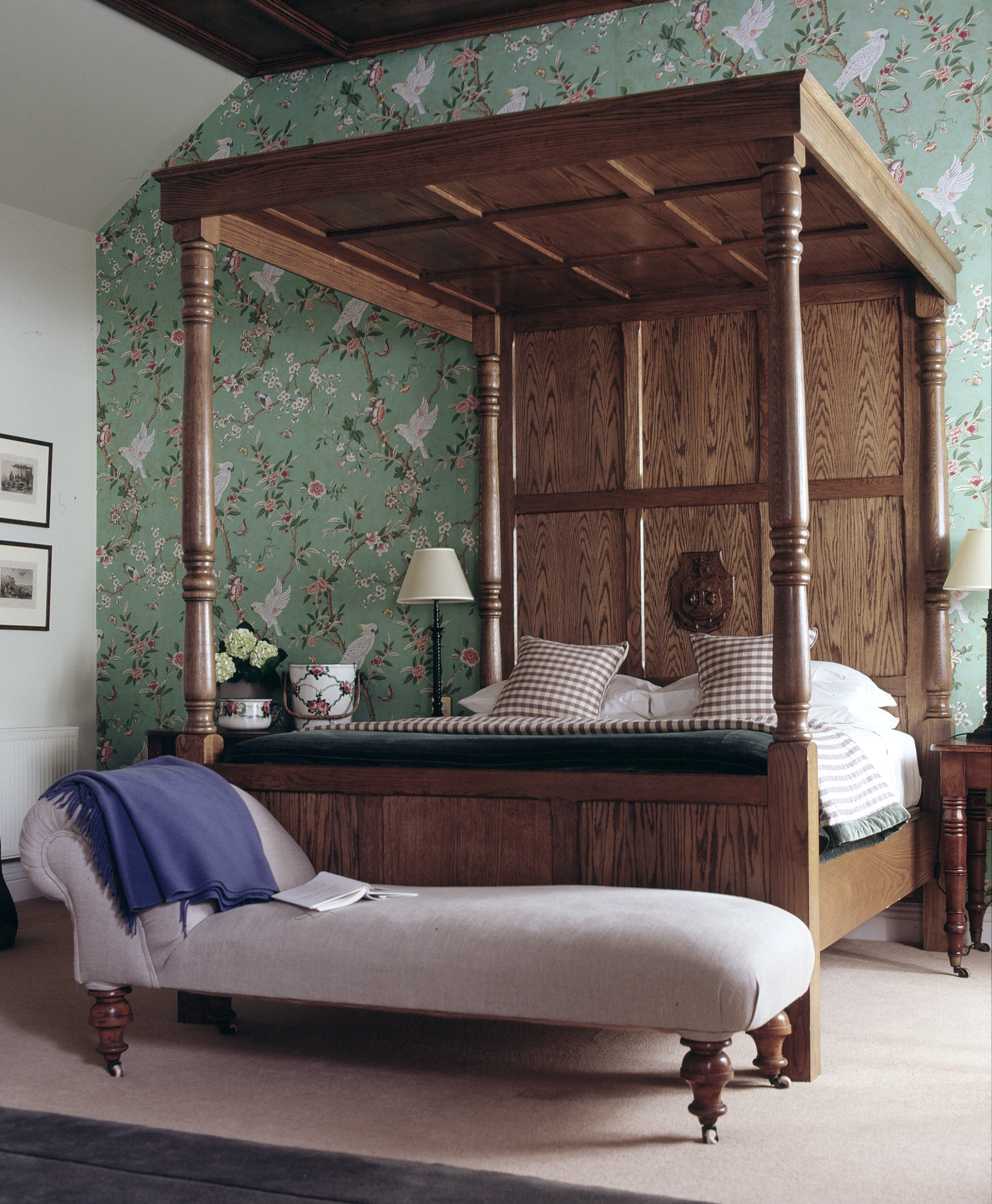
The Martyn Suite, the kitchen before the house was converted to a luxury hotel.

== Today ==
The Georgian residence is still operated as a hotel. The tower house has been restored from its ruinous state and is now a private residence.
