= Ballyvaughan =

Harbour village in County Clare, Ireland

Ballyvaughan Baile Uí Bheacháin
- Village
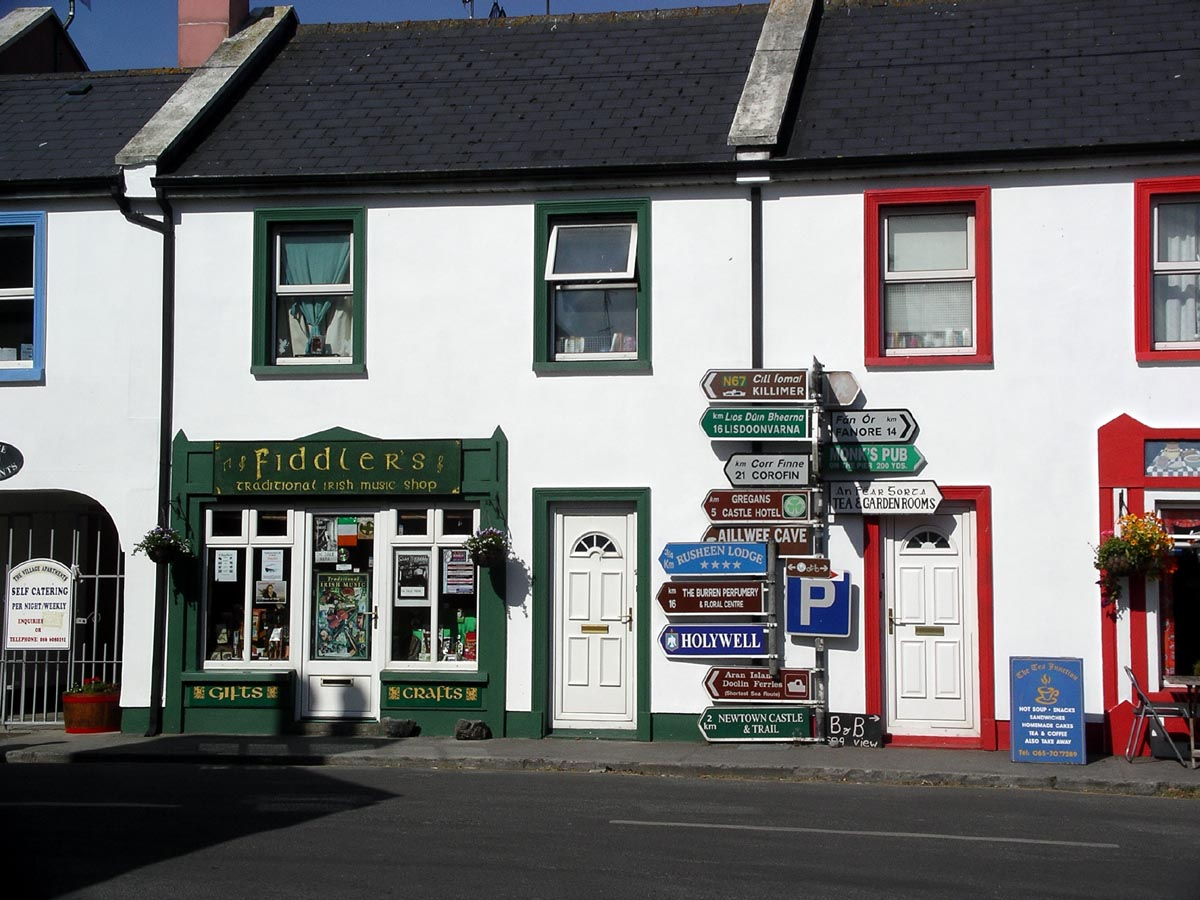
- The junction at the centre of Ballyvaughan, still featuring the full signpost.

- Location in Ireland
- Coordinates: 53°06′56″N 9°08′58″W
- Country: Ireland
- Province: Munster
- County: County Clare

Population (2022)
  - Total: 361
- Time zone: UTC+0 (WET)
  - Summer (DST): UTC+1 (IST (WEST))
- Irish Grid Reference: M264077
- Website: www.ballyvaughanireland.com

Ballyvaughan or Ballyvaghan (Irish: Baile Uí Bheacháin, meaning 'Ó Beachán's townland') is a small harbour village in County Clare, Ireland. It is on the N67 road on the south shores of Galway Bay, in the northwest corner of The Burren. This position on the coast road and the close proximity to many of the area's sights has turned the village into a local center of tourism. As of the 2022 census, Ballyvaughan had a population of 361. The area was officially classified as part of the West Clare Gaeltacht, an Irish-speaking community, until 1956.

== History ==
The site was originally occupied by Ballyvaughan Castle, which stood right at the edge of the harbour. It was owned and occupied by the O'Loghlen family, except for a period in the 16th century when the O'Brians held it. In 1540, a stolen cow was found at the castle, and heavy fines were levied on the O'Loghlens—loss of cattle, goats, sheep and the town of Ballyvaughan. In 1569 the castle was attacked by Sir Henry Sidney, but the O'Loghlens held on to the property. By 1840, the castle was in ruins. Only the foundations remain today.

On the promontory on which the castle was situated (and on which the Irish Cottage scheme is today located), there were also other late medieval dwellings. According to Westropp's survey of Clare antiquities, the area contained "three small forts and a much levelled ring of a great Caher."

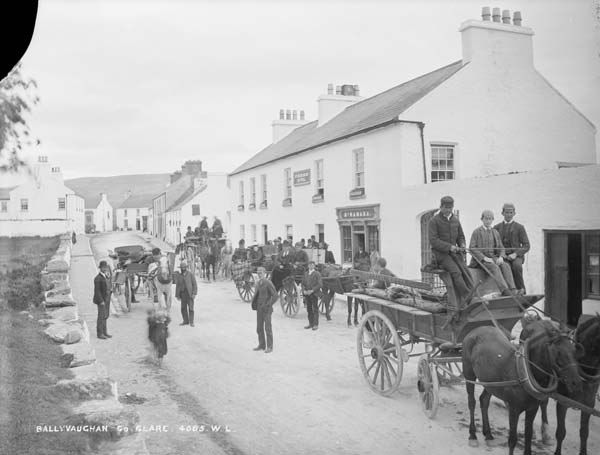
Ballyvaughan in the late 19th century

The present village grew around the harbour in the 19th century, when it temporarily was a thriving port. Three older piers had been built by the villagers, who used them for herring fishing. However, these piers were almost unusable at high tide and in 1829, the Fishery Board had a new quay constructed. The pier was designed by Alexander Nimmo. By 1831, turf from Connemara was landed here in great quantities, despite the shallowness of the bay. At that point, the town had 23 houses and 151 inhabitants. In 1837, to facilitate the turf trade, another quay was constructed, apparently also based on a design of Nimmo's. By 1841 the village had grown to 235 inhabitants and 35 houses. The new quay was of great importance, as it allowed Ballyvaughan to export grain, bacon and vegetables and to import supplies from Galway. For a while, Ballyvaughan was the official capital of this region of Clare, sporting a workhouse, coastguard station and large police barracks. Over time, as the roads improved and the piers fell into disrepair, the town lost its importance as a fishing harbour.

More construction took place in the 1850s: in 1854, the old National School opened, and the present Roman Catholic church was built around 1860. There was also a Church of Ireland, but when this later closed, it was dismantled and re-erected at Noughaval. In 1943, it was rededicated, and it is now in use as a Catholic place of worship (St. Mochua) there.

In 1872 a reservoir was constructed by Lord Annaly, southeast of the town, to supply water to the farms in the valley. This water supply was extended to the centre of town under the Public Health (Ireland) Act 1874 by the Board of Guardians, using cast-iron pipes. In 1875 a fountain was erected by two brothers from Connemara, the Coyne brothers, stuck in town after their ship had sunk at Gleninagh pier.

In May 1921, an Irish Republican Army (IRA) unit of approximately 25 men successfully ambushed a party of 10 Royal Marines and their sergeant in the village near the old post office. The IRA unit captured some weapons and withdrew. Privates Chandler and Bolton were mortally wounded, and Privates Lavin and Currell wounded.

Historical maps of Ballyvaughan show the locations of notable buildings such as the Workhouse, Courthouse, Fair Green, Police Barracks, Coast Guard Station, Blacksmith's forge, hotels, and other sites of interest. These maps also indicate the locations of surrounding pre-Famine villages, including Wood Village in the townland of Knocknagroagh, along with various archaeological sites that may be of interest.

For those researching family history, details about the families who lived in these nearby villages can be found in Griffith’s Valuation—the first comprehensive property valuation conducted in Ireland between 1847 and 1864. Of particular value to genealogists are the family names recorded during this period.

At the time of the 1942/43 ITA survey, the number of inhabitants was 194. By 1991, this had dropped to 184.

== Economy ==
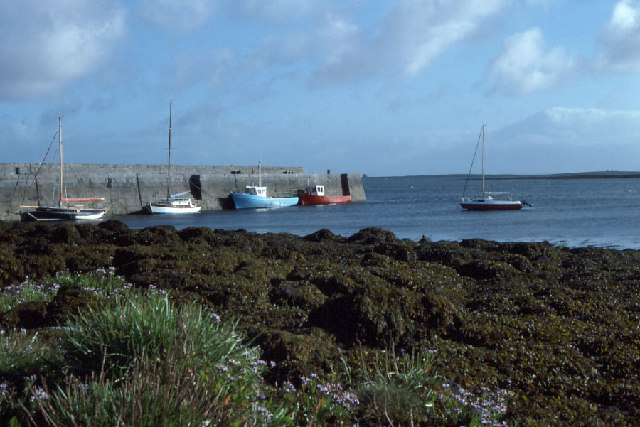
Ballyvaughan Harbour and Pier

Today, Ballyvaughan's economy is mainly based on tourism. Its position on the coast road between Galway and the Cliffs of Moher brings significant pass-through tourism business. Ballyvaughan has numerous pubs, restaurants, shops, B&Bs, self-catering cottages and other amenities. These include the new pier and slipway, constructed in 2006, which has opened up the area to boating, fishing, scuba diving and other maritime activities. Ballyvaughan is on the Burren Way, a long-distance walking trail.

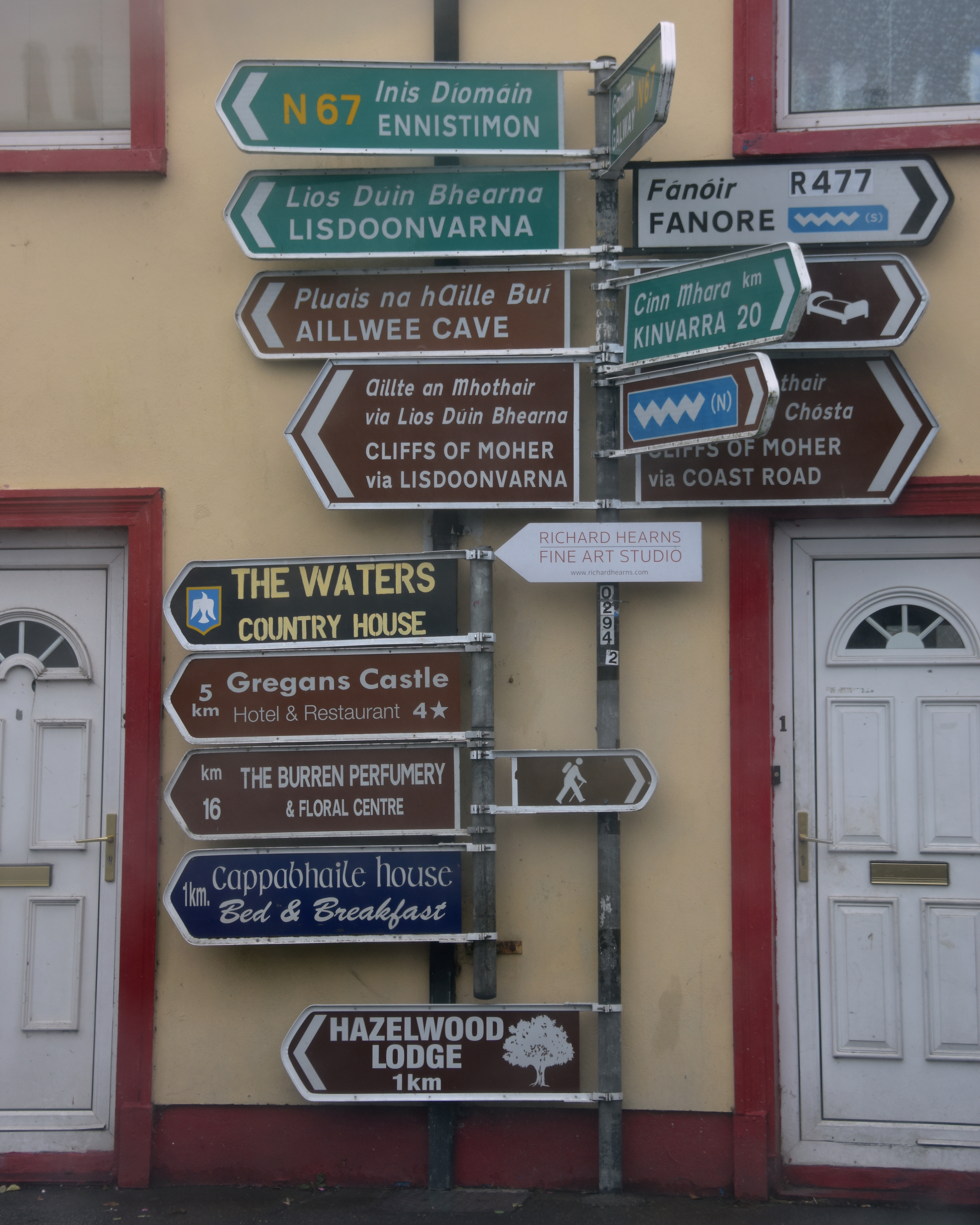
Ballyvaughan signpost in 2018

A previous landmark in the village was the Ballyvaughan signpost. Tourism Ireland long used pictures of the signposts, at the T-junction in the center of the village, to market Ireland internationally. The signpost featured a number of colourful signs, many of which had been installed by private enterprises. Those were removed by the National Roads Authority in June 2011, causing an outcry from some residents.

During the boom, Ballyvaughan had been tagged Ireland's 'Gold Coast' as a result of the huge rise in the area's property prices. Demand for holiday homes had seen the average house price in the town increase from €45,000 in 1995 to €480,000 in 2005.

Although the building of a local waste water disposal/treatment system has been discussed for many years, as of 2016 the sewage of Ballyvaughan is still pumped untreated into the sea. Construction of a treatment works was delayed until 2019.

== Places of interest ==
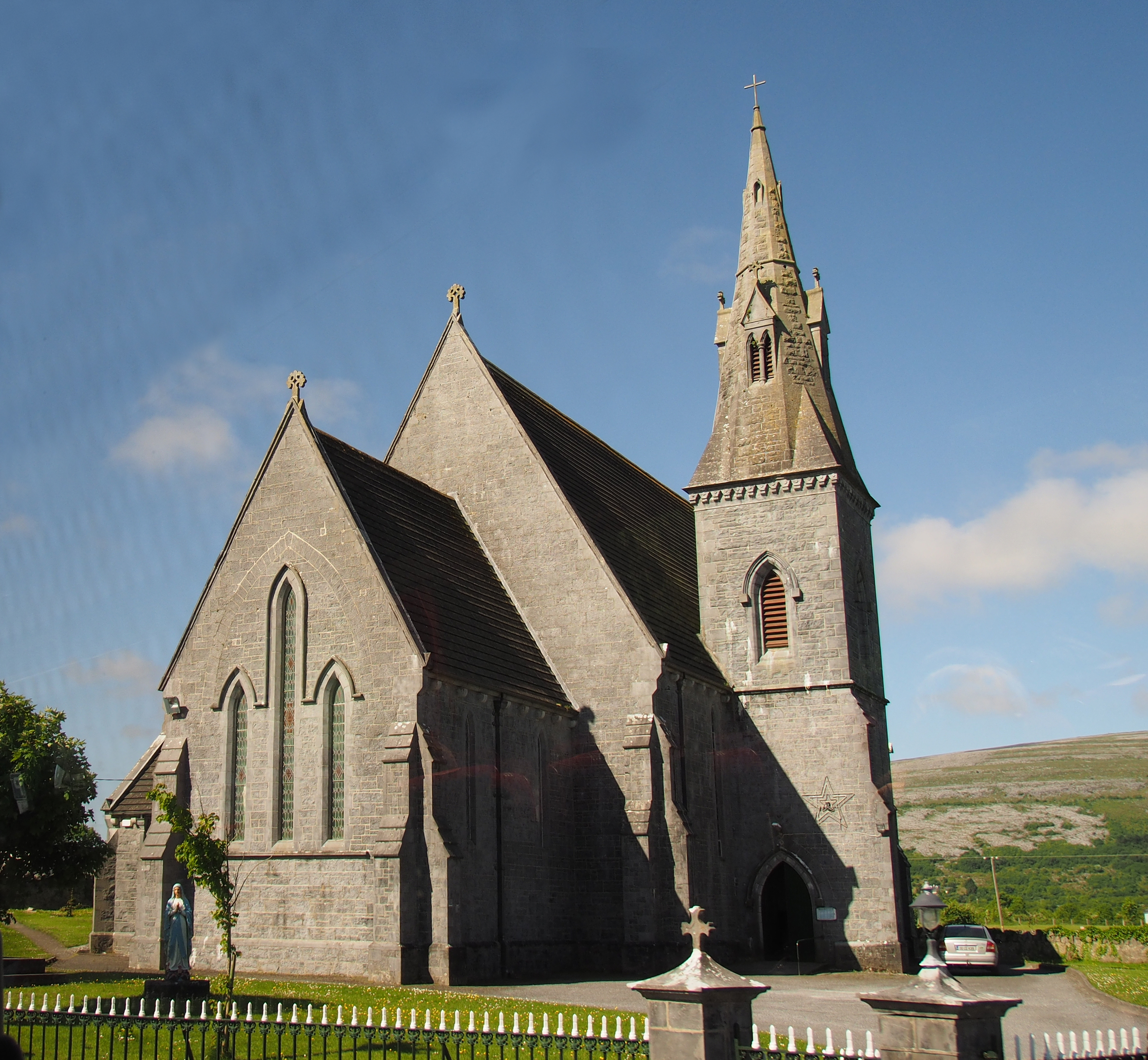
Ballyvaughan Church

- The Burren: Each year botanists and naturalists roam this karst landscape in search of Arctic, Alpine and Mediterranean plants that grow profusely over the limestone pavements. The Burren is renowned for its archaeology. Ballyvaughan is near numerous megalithic tombs such as Poulnabrone dolmen, 8 kilometres (5 mi) south of Ballyvaughan, ring forts such as Caherconnell Stone Fort, Ballyallaban ringfort or Cahermore ringfort as well as medieval churches and castles/tower houses, such as at Gleninagh.
- 3.5 km to the south is the Aillwee Cave, a show cave over 1 kilometre (0.6 mi) long.
- Beside the Aillwee Caves, just 400 metres north of the upper car-park is the novice rock-climbing location of Aill na Cronain.
- For trained cave explorers, there is the Pollnagollum, Faunarooska, and the Cullaun series.
- The Burren College of Art is outside Ballyvaughan at Newtown Castle.

== Notable people ==
- Liam Jegou, Olympic canoeist
- Daithí Ó Drónaí, electronic music producer
- Sarah Poyntz, writer
- Mary Ann Nevins Radzinowicz, academic

== See also ==
- List of towns and villages in Ireland
- Burren Gold cheese
- Gregans Castle
