= Cahermore ringfort =

Ringfort in County Clare, Ireland

- Cathair Mór
- Caher Mór (also Ballyallaban stone fort)
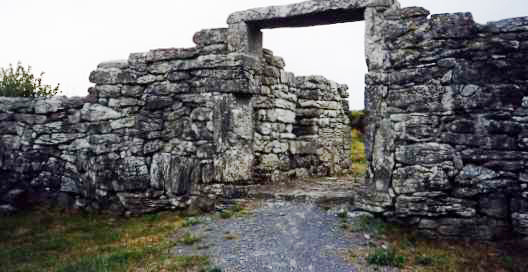
- The entry with restored lintel in 2006

- Location within Ireland
- 53.085432°N 9.164229°W
- Type: ringfort
- Periods: unknown, but inhabited in the 14th/15th century
- Location: Parish of Rathborney, the Burren
- Region: Ireland

Site notes
- Material: limestone
- Public access: Yes

National monument of Ireland
- Reference no.: 648

Cahermore ringfort (Irish: Cathair Mór) or sometimes Caher Mór or "Ballyallaban stone fort" is a ringfort south of Ballyvaughan in the Burren area, in County Clare, Ireland. It is a National Monument.

== Location ==
The fort lies right next to the R480 road between the village of Ballyvaughan and Leamaneh Castle. It is located in the townland of Ballyallaban in the civil parish of Rathborney.

== Description ==
The walls are up to 9 feet thick and 9 feet high, with two faces of large, well-fitted blocks with rubble filled in between. The lintel and building remains inside the fort are considered late medieval features. Next to the entryway are guard chambers, which could indicate that the former inhabitants were of high status.

The national monument number 648 actually consists of two separate forts: the stone fort of Cahermore and the nearby earthen Ballyallaban ringfort.

== Excavation ==
A limited excavation occurred after the lintel stone fell down in the late 1990s. A coin from 1690 was found.

According to the National Monuments Service: "Excavation (Licence no. 99E0506) in this area took place in June 1999 as the entranceway was blocked with rubble and the lintel had fallen across the entrance passage. The excavations revealed that the structures around the entrance were a 14th/15th-century addition to the pre-existing fort. A scallop shell from below the foundations was radiocarbon dated to AD 1308. The lintel was replaced and the entranceway was consolidated in 2001."
