= Uí Lochlainn =

Irish family

The Uí Lochlainn, also known as the Ó Lochlainn family, were a leading kindred in the Burren region of County Clare.

The Uí Lochlainn were a branch of the Corcu Mruad. In Irish their surname was Ua Lochlainn and Ó Lochlainn. Forms of the personal name Lochlainn first appear on record in the tenth century; the earliest known bearer being Lochlaind mac Maíl Shechnaill, heir of the Corcu Mruad, whose death is noted in 983.

In the sixteenth century, the family's principal seat was situated in the Gragans, at a tower house near the site of the later Gregans Castle. The Uí Lochlainn chieftains lost autonomy in the seventeenth century, although later descendants of the chiefs continued to live in the heart of the family's ancestral lands until twentieth century.
