= Ballycarbery Castle =

Castle in County Kerry, Ireland

- County Kerry; Near Cahersiveen in Ireland
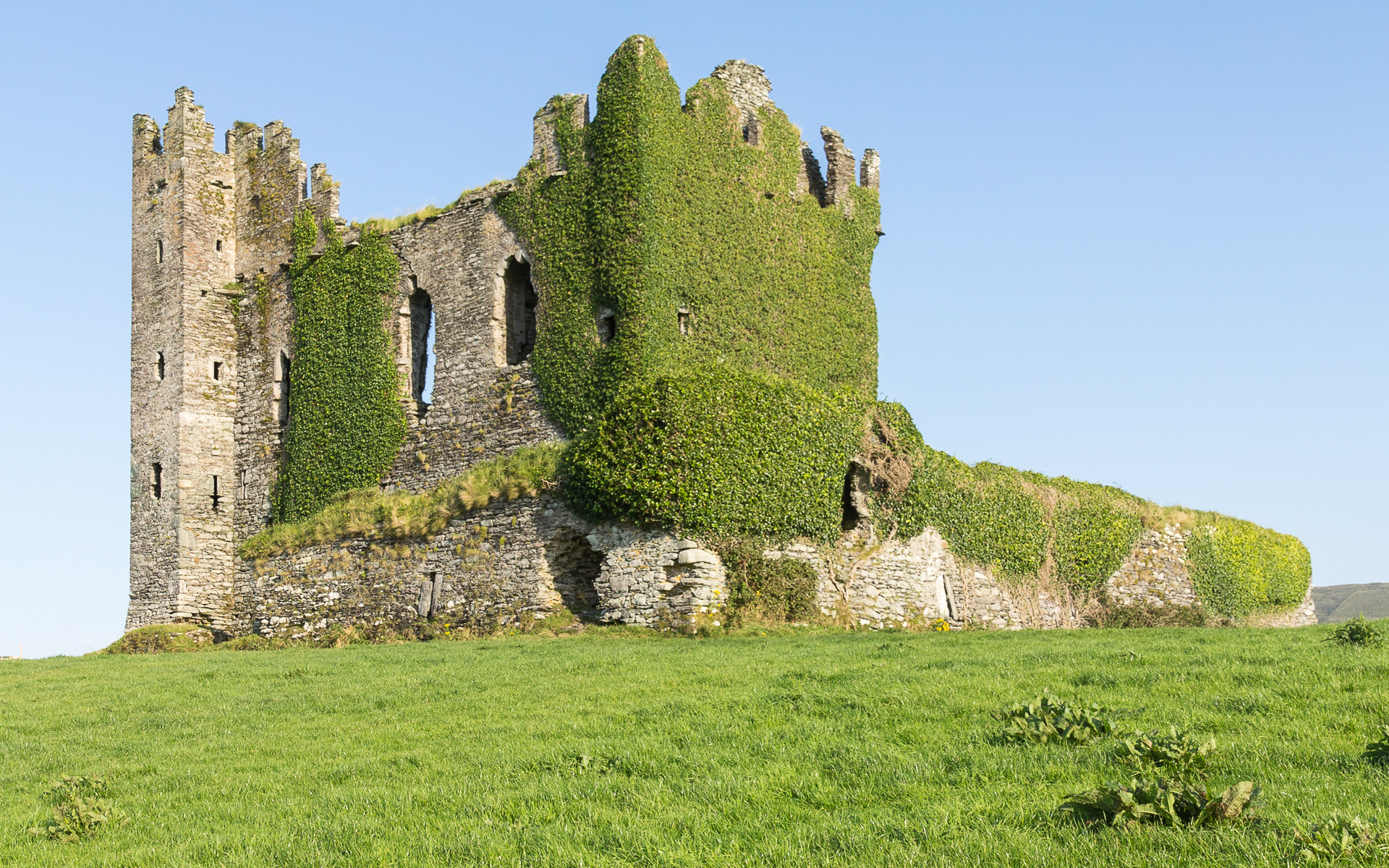

Site information
- Type: Castle
- Open to the public: No
- Condition: Ruined
- Website: https://ballycarbery.com

Location
- Location in Ireland
- Coordinates: 51°56′55.9″N 10°15′31.16″W

Site history
- Built: 16th Century
- In use: 1398-20th Century
- Fate: Fell to ruin
- Battles/wars: War of the Three Kingdoms

Ballycarbery Castle is a castle 3 kilometres (2 mi) from Cahersiveen, County Kerry, Ireland. The castle is high on a grass hill facing the sea and is a short distance from Cahergall Fort and Leacanabuile Fort.

== History ==
The original fortification was established by the castle's namesake, Carberry O'Shea, 1398. The property was later lost in a conflict with the MacCarthy clan. The present ruins are of a castle that was constructed in the 16th century. It was noted as a McCarthy Mor castle by some sources at that time but whether it was occupied by the McCarthy Mors or their wardens the O'Connells is unknown. The castle was passed onto Sir Valentine Browne following the death of its owner Donal McCarthy More. In 1652 it was attacked by cannon fire from Parliament forces during the War of the Three Kingdoms. In the 18th century, a house was built on the site using the barn wall and it was inhabited by the Lauder family. This house was demolished in the early 20th century.

== Structure ==
The castle was surrounded by a high wall with less than half still remaining. There are arrow slits dotted along the bottom of the remaining wall. A staircase remains inside one part of the wall, but is not easily accessible.

The ground floor of the castle was made up of several chambers but only one chamber is still roofed and walled. It is a large chamber with a high roof and in one corner a staircase leading upstairs. There are two different staircases leading to the first floor and there is also a path up the back of the castle since the whole back wall is missing. One of the staircases is up on a height inside the ground floor chamber and is in good condition. The other is entered from outside the chamber and is slightly damaged. The first floor is covered in grass and has some windows and a few small rooms but is mostly in the open. The first floor is the highest accessible part of the castle as the steps to the second floor must have been attached to the now missing back wall.

Until sometime in 2017, it was possible to walk around the castle grounds and climb on the castle ruins. However, the castle is situated on private land, and the owner of the land has eliminated public access to the castle due to health and safety reasons. Visitors can, however, view the structure from a small parking area located about 100 metres from the front of the castle.

== Gallery ==
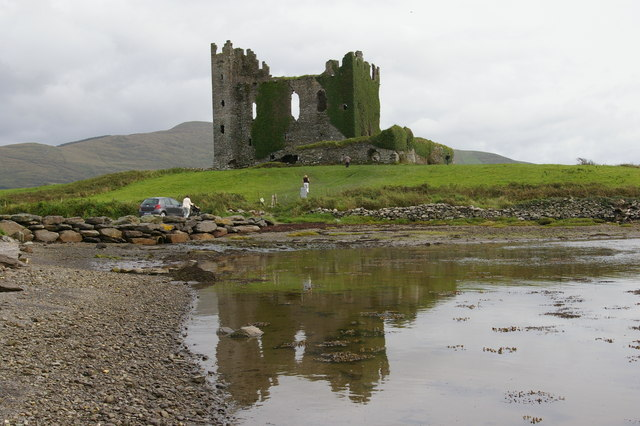
Ballycarbery Castle

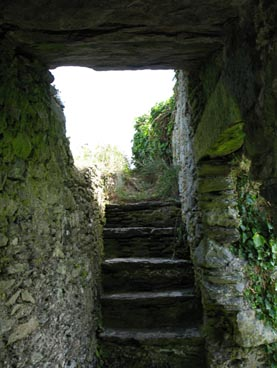
Steps inside the wall

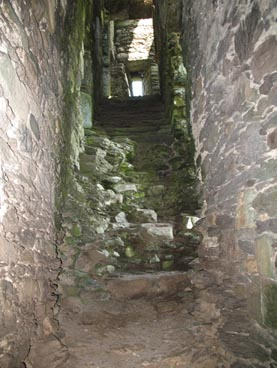
Broken stairs

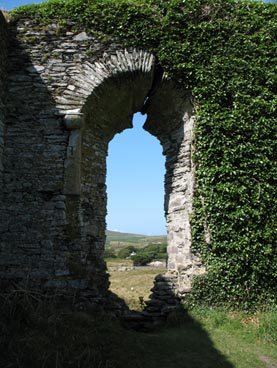
First floor window

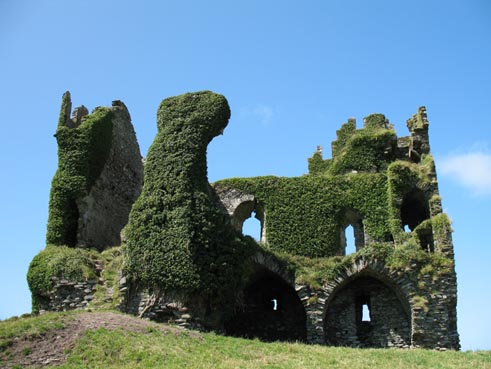
Exposed side of the castle
