= Cabinet collective responsibility =

Political concept in parliamentary politics

Cabinet collective responsibility, also known as Cabinet solidarity or collective ministerial responsibility, is a cornerstone constitutional convention in parliamentary systems and a cornerstone of the Westminster system of government, that members of the cabinet must publicly support all governmental decisions made in Cabinet, even if they do not privately agree with them. This support includes voting for the government in the legislature. This convention formed in the 19th century in the United Kingdom. Some political parties, most commonly communist, apply a similar convention of democratic centralism to their central committee.

If a member of the Cabinet wishes to openly object to a Cabinet decision then they are obliged to resign from their position in the Cabinet or as a minister.

Cabinet collective responsibility is related to the fact that if a vote of no confidence is passed in parliament, the government is responsible collectively, and thus the entire government resigns. The consequence will be that a new government will be formed or parliament will be dissolved and a general election will be called. Cabinet collective responsibility is not the same as individual ministerial responsibility, which states that ministers are responsible for the running of their departments, and therefore culpable for the departments' mistakes.

== Overview ==
Cabinet collective responsibility is a tradition in parliamentary governments in which the prime minister is responsible for appointing the cabinet ministers. The cabinet ministers are usually selected from the same political party as the prime minister to make collective decision-making for legislation faster and more effective. Unlike a presidential system, as used, for example, in the United States, a parliamentary system's executive and legislative branches are intertwined. Because of the fusion of powers of the executive and legislative branches the prime minister relies on the cabinet to always support policy decisions. A breach of cabinet collective responsibility, such as when a cabinet member publicly disagrees with an executive decision, results in resignation or termination from the cabinet. The New South Wales Parliamentary Library Research Service in Australia explains that "one aspect of collective ministerial responsibility is that Ministers share responsibility for major government decisions, particularly those made by the cabinet and, even if they personally object to such decisions, Ministers must be prepared to accept and defend them or resign from the cabinet".

Cabinet collective responsibility consists of two main features:

Cabinet confidentiality
the members of the cabinet must not reveal the content of discussions which take place. This allows for cabinet members to privately debate and raise concerns.
Cabinet solidarity
the members of the cabinet must publicly show a unified position, and must vote with the government even if they privately disagree with the decision that has been made.

Collective responsibility is not circumvented by appointing Ministers outside of Cabinet, as has occurred in New Zealand where, from 2005 to 2008, Winston Peters and Peter Dunne were Ministers outside of Cabinet, despite their parties not being considered part of a coalition.

In non-parliamentary governments like that of the United States, cabinet collective responsibility is not formally practiced. This is due to a clearer separation of the executive and the legislature in policy-making. The United States president's cabinet members cannot simultaneously serve in Congress, and therefore cannot vote on legislation supported by the executive. The president instead has veto power over legislation passed by Congress. Cabinet unity and collective agreement between members are important to cabinet stability and party politics, but cabinet members do not have to publicly support legislation proposed or supported by the president. It is, however, in a cabinet member's best interest to support and align with the president's policies because they serve at the pleasure of the president, who can at any time dismiss them or appoint them to another position.

== Examples ==
Parliamentary democracies such as Australia, the United Kingdom and Canada practice and adhere to cabinet collective responsibility. Rhodes, Wanna and Weller offer this description of the principle of cabinet solidarity in Westminster systems of parliamentary democracy: "Cabinet solidarity and collective responsibility are twin dimensions of responsible party government that enjoy constitutionality, albeit informally. They lie at the core of ministerial governance. Cabinet solidarity is purely a political convention designed to maintain or protect the collective good as perceived by a partisan ministry. It rests on the notion that the executive ought to appear a collective entity, able to maintain cohesion and display political strength".

=== Australia ===
In Australia, cabinet collective responsibility is fundamental to cabinet confidentiality, but also to protect private information from becoming public and possibly threatening national security. Cabinet solidarity is not a legal requirement, but a political convention and practiced norm. There is no written law that upholds cabinet collective responsibility, but it is deeply ingrained in Australia's cabinets as a political norm and is therefore an important aspect of the collective strength and influence of the prime minister's administration.

Occasionally on highly controversial issues such as the 1999 republic referendum, there may be a conscience vote where any MP may vote as they wish, but these issues are rare and never tied to official party policy, and normally party discipline is very tight.

A similar shadow cabinet collective responsibility is also followed by the opposition for its shadow cabinet.

=== Canada ===
In Canada, the cabinet is on rare occasion allowed to freely vote its conscience and to oppose the government without consequence, as occurred with the vote on capital punishment under Brian Mulroney. These events are rare and are never on matters of confidence. The most prominent Canadian cabinet minister to resign because he could not vote with the cabinet was John Turner, who refused to support wage and price controls. In Canada, party discipline is much tighter than in other Westminster-system countries; it is very rare for any MP to vote counter to the party leadership.

=== Finland ===
In Finland, collective responsibility has been established both constitutionally and as a convention. The Finnish Government and its ministers are collectively responsible for all its decisions. However, the constitution allows a minister to dissent by expressing an objection which is entered into the minutes. Nevertheless, while formally allowed, dissent is uncommon because it jeopardizes the stability of the government. Namely, majority coalition governments became the norm after President Kekkonen retired in 1981. A new cabinet must be approved by a parliamentary majority, thus a government platform is agreed upon by the participating parties. It is distinct from party platforms and details the compromises that parties made in order to cooperate. If a party fails to follow the government platform, other parties in the government can pull the plug and force the entire government to resign.

=== Ireland ===
Article 28.4.2° of the Constitution of Ireland states:

The Government shall meet and act as a collective authority, and shall be collectively responsible for the Departments of state administered by the members of the Government.

In 1992, the Beef Tribunal was investigating allegations of political corruption, and wanted to take evidence from a minister about cabinet meetings at which controversial proposals had been discussed. The Supreme Court ruled in 1993 that such discussions could not be disclosed because Article 28.4.2° required absolute confidentiality of cabinet discussions (though not of decisions which were formally recorded). The Seventeenth Amendment of the Constitution was passed by referendum in 1997 to add Article 28.4.3°, which allows such disclosures in exceptional circumstances.

=== New Zealand ===
In New Zealand, the principle of cabinet confidentiality is always observed. However, Cabinet solidarity can be weakened in coalition governments in which members from junior parties in the cabinet can openly dissent on specific policies through "agree to disagree" arrangements.

=== United Kingdom ===
The United Kingdom practices cabinet collective responsibility. The prime minister selects a number of cabinet ministers from the House of Commons and the House of Lords. Once selected as cabinet ministers, each minister leads one of the government departments. Cabinet ministers respond to oral questions from MPs. The cabinet members, along with the Prime Minister, schedule weekly closed door sessions to discuss the collective stance of the cabinet to avoid inconsistent responses from cabinet ministers. The solidarity of the cabinet is consistently challenged by the opposition in an attempt to create contradictions between cabinet ministers. It is therefore imperative for the cabinet members to have their responses as common and similar as possible.

In the United Kingdom, the doctrine applies to all members of the government, from members of the cabinet down to Parliamentary Private Secretaries. Its inner workings are set out in the Ministerial Code. On occasion, this principle has been suspended; most notably in the 1930s when in Britain the National Government allowed its Liberal members to oppose the introduction of protective tariffs; and again when Harold Wilson allowed Cabinet members to campaign both for and against the 1975 referendum on whether the UK should remain in the European Economic Community. In 2003, Tony Blair allowed Clare Short to stay in the cabinet, despite her public opposition to the 2003 Iraq War; however, she later resigned.

Prime Minister David Cameron suspended the cabinet collective responsibility doctrine for the 2016 EU referendum, following the precedent set by Harold Wilson in 1975. Prominent cabinet ministers including Michael Gove and Chris Grayling opted to make use of the relaxation by campaigning to leave.

== Advantages ==
A parliamentary system that uses cabinet collective responsibility is more likely to avoid contradictions and disagreements between cabinet members of the executive branch. Cabinet ministers are likely to feel there is a practical and collective benefit from being part of a team. Cabinet collective responsibility to the people also benefits party and personal loyalty to the prime minister. Solidarity within the cabinet can strengthen the prime minister's party and accelerate policy decisions and interests of that party. Presidential democracies often lack the ability to pass legislation quickly in times of emergency or instances of national security.

== Disadvantages ==
Because cabinet collective responsibility forces the cabinet ministers to publicly agree with the prime minister's decisions, political debate and internal discourse is hindered. When disagreements occur within a cabinet dependent on collective responsibility, negotiating collective agreements can be difficult. Cabinet collective responsibility is therefore dependent on the mutual agreement and collective unity of the cabinet and its members.

== See also ==
- Ministerial rule
- Principal Officials Accountability System
- Political Appointments System in Hong Kong
