= Hugh O'Flaherty (judge) =

Irish judge and barrister (1938–2026)

Judge of the Supreme Court
- In office 26 March 1990 – 17 April 1999
- Nominated by: Government of Ireland
- Appointed by: Patrick Hillery

Personal details
- Born: 20 January 1938 Killarney, County Kerry, Ireland
- Died: 5 August 2026 (aged 88) Cahersiveen, County Kerry, Ireland
- Spouse: Kathleen O'Flaherty
- Children: 4
- Education: University College Dublin; King's Inns

Hugh James O'Flaherty (20 January 1938 – 5 August 2026) was an Irish judge and barrister who served as a judge of the Supreme Court from 1990 to 1999.

== Life and career ==
Hugh James O'Flaherty was born in Killarney, County Kerry on 20 January 1938. He was educated at University College Dublin, and the King's Inns. He was called to the Bar in 1959 and became a Senior Counsel in 1976. He was appointed to the Supreme Court in 1990, directly from the bar. He was later elected as a bencher of the King's Inns. He retired from the Supreme Court in 1999, following the Philip Sheedy affair.

After his resignation, O'Flaherty was nominated by Charlie McCreevy, the Minister for Finance, to be Ireland's representative to the European Investment Bank, taking the position of vice-president. This appointment resulted in a public outcry, and was eventually withdrawn by the government.

O'Flaherty died at his residence in Cahersiveen, County Kerry, on 5 August 2026, at the age of 88.
