= Kennedy v Ireland =

1987 Irish High Court case on phone tapping

- Court: High Court
- Full case name: Geraldine Kennedy & Others v Ireland & Another
- Decided: 12 January 1987
- Citation: [1987] IR 587, [1988] ILRM 472

Court membership
- Judge sitting: Hamilton P.

Keywords
- Right to privacy; Phone tapping; Constitution of Ireland

Kennedy v Ireland is an Irish constitutional law case about right to privacy under the Constitution of Ireland.

== Background ==
Geraldine Kennedy was a political correspondent with The Sunday Tribune, and Bruce Arnold was a journalist with The Irish Independent. After November 1982 Irish general election, the Charles Haughey's Fianna Fáil government was replaced by a Fine Gael-Labour coalition. Just weeks after, on 18 December 1982, The Irish Times security correspondent Peter Murtagh revealed that Haughey's justice minister Seán Doherty had authorised wiretapping of Kennedy's and Arnold's residential telephone numbers.

Before the High Court, Kennedy, Arnold, and Arnold's wife, Mavis Arnold, sued the State. They argued that their constitutional right to privacy under Article 40.3 had been violated through the unlawful tapping of their telephones. They argued that the State failed to protect their personal rights, infringed on their professional and private lives, and interfered with their freedom of expression by monitoring and transcribing their conversations without lawful justification. Article 40.3 reads:

1. The State guarantees in its laws to respect, and, as far as practicable, by its laws to defend and vindicate the personal rights of the citizen.
2. The State shall, in particular, by its laws protect as best it may from unjust attack and, in the case of injustice done, vindicate the life, person, good name, and property rights of every citizen.

The State conceded that while such phone tapping warrants were issued only in very limited circumstances, there was no justification for the tapping Kennedy's or Arnolds' telephone. However it argued, that while tapping was improper, it was not illegal nor did it interfere with any constitutional rights of Kennedy or the Arnolds.

== Decision ==
The President of the High Court, Judge Hamilton held that government's unauthorized phone tapping violated Kennedys' and Arnold's constitutional right to privacy.
