= Susan O'Keeffe =

Irish journalist and former politician (born 1960)

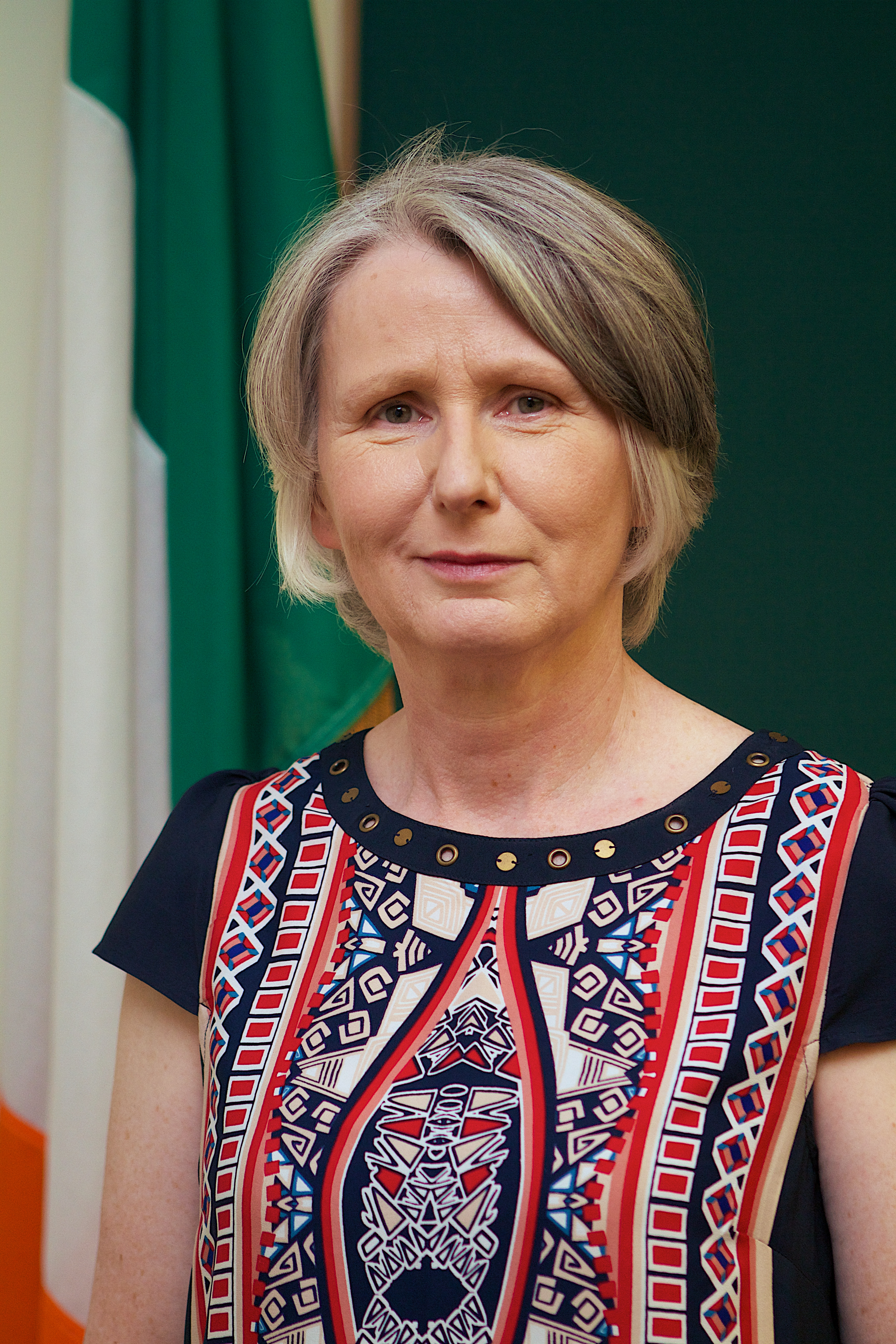
- O'Keeffe in 2014

Senator
- In office 25 May 2011 – 8 June 2016
- Constituency: Agricultural Panel

Personal details
- Born: 18 September 1960 (age 65) Dublin, Ireland
- Party: Labour Party
- Children: 3
- Education: University College Cork
- Profession: Journalist

Susan O'Keeffe (born 18 September 1960) is an Irish journalist and former Labour Party politician.

== Personal life ==
She was educated at Mount Anville Secondary School, Dublin, and at University College Cork. She lives in Collooney, County Sligo with her husband and three children.

== Journalism ==
O'Keeffe is a journalist by profession. In 1995, when working on World in Action, she was threatened with prison in Ireland for refusing to reveal her sources. She had investigated scandals within the Irish meat industry in two films in 1991. The investigation centred on the Goodman International group – involving tax fraud, misappropriation of beef and Larry Goodman's dealings with Saddam Hussein's Iraq, leading to the setting-up of a Tribunal of Inquiry, known as the Beef Tribunal, which found that much of her criticism of the industry was substantiated. However, the Tribunal demanded that she name her informants, and when she refused to do so, she was charged by the Director of Public Prosecutions. The case became a cause célèbre in Ireland, and, in January 1995, she faced trial for contempt of court but was cleared of the charge. She was honoured in the 1994 Freedom of Information Awards for her stand.

== Politics ==
She was an unsuccessful candidate at the 2011 general election for Sligo–North Leitrim, polling 4,553 first preference votes (10.2%). She was also a candidate in the 2009 European Parliament election for the North-West constituency. Her candidacy in the 2011 general election was not helped by the fact that three former members of the Labour Party stood against her. She was elected to the 24th Seanad in April 2011 by the Agricultural Panel.

She was appointed whip of the Labour Senators in the Seanad. In May 2012, it was reported that she had the worst voting record amongst Labour Party Senators. A motion of no confidence in her was tabled by Senator John Whelan, although later withdrawn. It was reported in The Irish Times that "Ms O’Keeffe is considered by her critics to be too close to the leadership and inclined to play along with the official Labour Party line of accepting Fine Gael's proposal to abolish the Upper House."

At the 2016 general election, she unsuccessfully contested in Sligo–Leitrim. She was not re-elected to the Seanad.
