= Jerry Grogan =

Irish stadium announcer

Personal information
- Native name: Gearóid Ó Gruagáin
- Born: Cahersiveen, County Kerry
- Occupation: Schoolteacher
- Years active: c. 1978/9–
- Employer: GAA
- Relative: Cumman na mBunscol

Sport
- Sport: Gaelic football
- Position: Stadium announcer

Jerry Grogan is an Irish stadium announcer known as "the voice of Croke Park". Croke Park is both the principal national stadium of Ireland and the headquarters of the Gaelic Athletic Association (GAA). As well as to spectators, Grogan's voice is familiar to television viewers during the broadcasting of games.

Alongside his status as stadium announcer, Grogan is heavily involved in Cumman na mBunscol and for many years has overseen the mini-games that occur on matchdays. As of 1998, he was Cumman na mBunscol's national development officer, involved in the Leinster Council and with Dublin's Hill 16 magazine and GAA Yearbook. It was former GAA president Seán Kelly who got Grogan involved in "jazzing up" matchday presentation. As soon as Kelly was elected president, in 2003, he invited Grogan, who was then a long-term Cumann na mBunscol activist, to oversee a Presentation Task Force. Grogan sits to the right of the Hogan Stand tunnel during games. He announces the deaths of GAA figures and others, describing the announcement of Seamus Heaney's death as a particular honour. Other than raising his voice to announce the arrival of the players as they emerge from the tunnel, his style does not contain much bombast. Grogan was involved in the development of Alan Brogan, Jim Gavin, Dean Rock and Ciarán Whelan. A Hall of Fame winner, it is also Grogan's responsibility to bring both Gaelic football's and hurling's major trophies (the Sam Maguire Cup and the Liam MacCarthy Cup) to RTÉ for the broadcaster's annual Up for the Match television programmes on the night before the two All-Ireland Senior Championship finals, as well as to mind the trophy on the day of the game.

Grogan was born in Cahersiveen, County Kerry and lives in Dublin. He left Kerry for Dublin in the 1970s. He was principal of Holy Trinity in Donaghmede until he retired in 2015. He refers to himself as a "Kerry Blue", a reference to the county colours of the Dublin GAA teams. Through his father's side of the family, his cousin Seán Grogan captained Offaly to the 1964 All-Ireland Minor Football Championship, while Leo and Michael Grogan played for Ferbane and Offaly, and Leo was a selector when Offaly won the 1982 All-Ireland Senior Football Championship.
