= River Ferta =

River in County Kerry, Ireland

Coordinates: 51.962551°N 10.184541°W

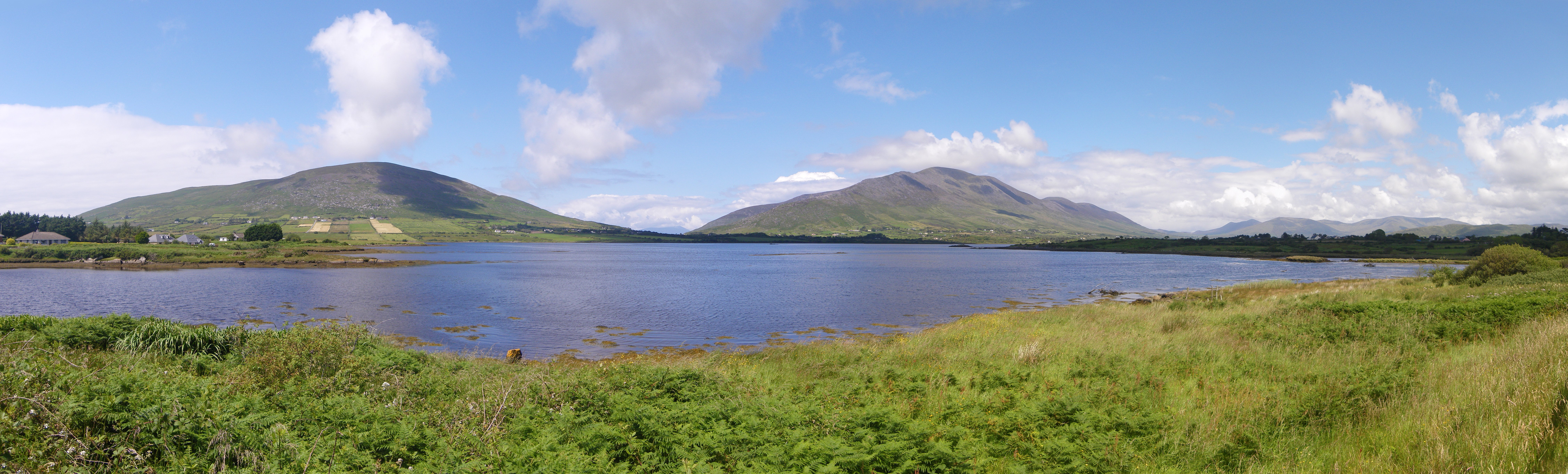
- Estuary of the River Ferta
- Native name: An Fhearta (Irish)

Physical characteristics
- Source
  - location: Teeromoyle
- Mouth
  - location: Atlantic Ocean via Valentia Harbour

The River Ferta or Fertha is a river in County Kerry in Ireland. It flows from the southwestern MacGillycuddy Reeks above Teeromoyle and travels ten miles before flowing into Valentia Harbour. The principal town in the region, Cahersiveen, is located close to the mouth of the river.

There are two crossings at Cahersiveen: an old railway bridge and a single carriageway used by cars. The town also has an artificial marina built in the early 2000s. A crossing over a tributary of the Ferta called the Cahran River was opened in 1992 in the same place that a previous crossing stood at Cahran Road.
