= Philip Sheedy affair =

Irish political and judicial controversy

The Philip Sheedy affair was an Irish political and judicial controversy which resulted in the resignation of both a Supreme Court and High Court judge.

== Background ==
Philip Sheedy, an architect, was involved in a road traffic accident in March 1996 at the Glenview Roundabout, Tallaght Bypass, County Dublin which resulted in the death of Anne Ryan. It transpired that Sheedy, who was driving a high performance sports car that he had purchased the previous day, was intoxicated. Sheedy pled guilty to causing death by dangerous driving before Judge Cyril Kelly (as he was then) in Dublin Circuit Criminal Court in October 1997 and also admitted to driving with excess alcohol. On the day of sentencing Judge Joseph Mathews was asked by Judge Kelly to step-in and sentence Sheedy. Judge Matthews imposed a four-year sentence on Sheedy with leave to apply for a review of the sentence after two years (20 October 1999), as well as banning him from driving for twelve years. On 6 November 1997 Judge Mathews granted an application on Sheedy's behalf to vacate the order which set 20 October 1999 as the review date of Sheedy's sentence.

Sheedy, after initially being incarcerated in Mountjoy Prison, was moved to Shelton Abbey, an open prison, after six months' imprisonment. There he was visited by his friend Joe Burke, a former Fianna Fáil councillor and a member of the so-called "Drumcondra Mafia", who had loaned the then Taoiseach, Bertie Ahern, £3,500 as part of the "dig outs" Ahern received around the time of his marriage break-up. Burke, who worked as a building contractor, had employed Sheedy as an architectural advisor to his company J&H Burke and Son.

In July 1998 the Taoiseach, Bertie Ahern, contacted then minister for justice John O'Donoghue to ask him whether it would be possible for Philip Sheedy to get day release. Initially, Ahern had vehemently denied that he concealed his representations to the Department of Justice on behalf of Philip Sheedy.

== Sentence review and release ==
Supreme Court judge Hugh O'Flaherty intervened on Sheedy's behalf after an "entirely by chance" encounter between the judge, who was walking his dog, and the son of a neighbour Ken Anderson and Anderson's girlfriend, who was Philip Sheedy's sister, in October 1998. After the encounter, Dublin County Registrar Michael Quinlan was called to Mr. Justice O'Flaherty's chambers to have Sheedy's case re-listed.

On 12 November 1998, after O'Flaherty's intervention, Sheedy's sentence was reviewed before Mr. Justice Cyril Kelly, and not Judge Matthews, as would be the correct procedure. After the brief hearing Mr. Justice Kelly remitted what was left of Sheedy's sentence. Neither the gardaí nor the Director of Public Prosecutions (DPP) were told of the review or the fact that Sheedy was released. The only representation by the state was the appearance of a clerk in the Chief State Solicitor's office who saw a listing for the matter and brought the file to court but did not know for what purpose.

== Fallout ==
=== High Court challenge ===
The DPP brought a High Court challenge to Mr. Justice Kelly's decision to release Sheedy in February 1999. Prior to the case being heard Sheedy had voluntarily returned to prison.

=== Hamilton Report ===
On the basis of the DPP's High Court challenge John O'Donoghue, then Minister for Justice asked Chief Justice Liam Hamilton to investigate the affair. The Chief Justice's report was published 16 April 1999. In it, Chief Justice Hamilton stated that Mr. Justice Kelly's handling of the matter and Mr. Justice O'Flaherty's intervention compromised the administration of justice.

=== Resignations ===
The first person to resign was Mr. Justice Hugh O'Flaherty. In his report, Chief Justice Hamilton was critical of O'Flaherty whose actions he deemed to be "open to misinterpretation." Initially, O'Flaherty refused to resign, and instead wrote to the Chairman of the Oireachtas's Justice, Equality and Women's Affairs Committee asking to make a statement to the committee as soon as possible, however, the next day he resigned from the Supreme Court.

On 20 April, Mr. Justice Cyril Kelly and Michael Quinlan, the Dublin County Registrar, resigned their positions.

=== O'Flaherty appointment to EIB ===
After his resignation Hugh O'Flaherty was nominated by Charlie McCreevy, then Minister for Finance, to be Ireland's representative to the European Investment Bank (EIB), taking the position of vice-president. This appointment resulted in a massive public outcry. The appointment was eventually withdrawn by the government.
