= Bentee =

Natural feature in Ireland

- Binn an Tí
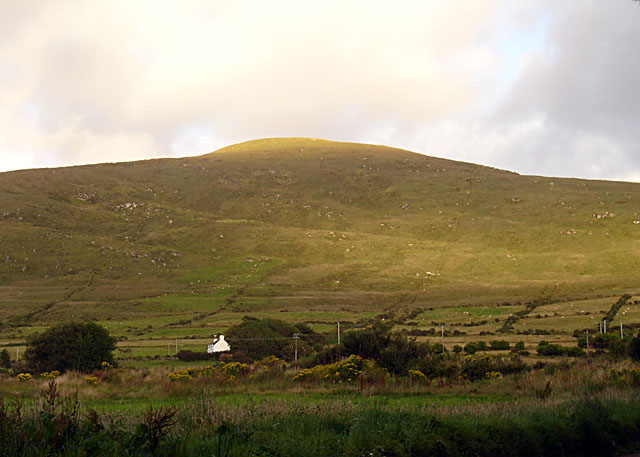

Highest point
- Elevation: 376 m (1,234 ft)
- Prominence: 270 m (890 ft)
- Listing: Marilyn
- Coordinates: 51°56′N 10°13′W

Naming
- English translation: peak of the house

Geography
- Location within Ireland
- Location: County Kerry, Ireland
- OSI/OSNI grid: V476780

Climbing
- Easiest route: Hike

Bentee or Benatee (from Irish Binn an Tí, meaning 'peak of the house') is a hill overlooking the town of Cahersiveen in County Kerry, Ireland.

== Geography ==
The hill has a height of 376 metres (1,234 ft), providing good views of the surrounding area, Valentia Island, the Skellig Islands, the Dingle Peninsula and MacGillycuddy's Reeks.

== Access to the summit ==
In recent years the Bentee Loop walking trail has been created. The main paths are over farmland, with the permission of the owners.
