= Larry Goodman =

Irish businessman (born 1937)

- Born: Laurence Goodman; 15 September 1937 (age 88); Dundalk, County Louth, Ireland
- Education: St Mary's College, Dundalk
- Spouse: Kitty Goodman
- Children: 2

Laurence Goodman (born 15 September 1937) is an Irish businessman, chiefly involved in the beef processing industry. He is the 6th generation of a livestock and meat exporting family and founded what is now ABP Food Group in 1954. He is the Executive Chairman of the company which has grown to become one of Europe's largest agri-business companies with 51 processing plants in Ireland, Great Britain, Spain, France, Denmark, Netherlands, Austria and Poland. ABP employs over 11,000 people. Separately, the Goodman family office has business interests in property, healthcare and productive arable and beef farming.

His companies attracted controversy during the 1991 Beef Tribunal, while a burger manufacturing facility, Silvercrest, was one of a number of high-profile food manufacturing facilities which were involved in the 2013 European horse meat scandal. An investigation by the Irish Government into the issue concluded that the company had never knowingly purchased meat containing equine DNA.

== Personal life ==
Goodman was born in County Louth in the east of Ireland. He attended St Mary's College, Dundalk, but left school without finishing his Intermediate Certificate, and followed his father into the meat industry, starting with meat by-products and sheep. He was "born to a well-off family who had been in the meat business for six generations". He lives with his wife Kitty at Castlebellingham, County Louth. His brother Peter Goodman, who had worked as deputy chairman of Goodman International (now deceased), fell out with Larry; they hadn't talked in years prior to his death. Larry owed Peter a large amount of money at the time of his death and refused to pay his widow what was rightly owed. His other brother Michael was a farmer in County Louth. They are no longer talking to one another.

== Business life ==
In the late 1960s Goodman bought Anglo-Irish Meats in Dundalk, which put him into the processing industry in a substantial way. He then began exporting, building up contacts in the Middle East in particular. He sold meat to Libya, Iran, Iraq and Egypt – often going himself as salesman. He was on the advisory committee for HSBC's opening of operations in Ireland in 1979, along with Dermot Nolan, Michael Carvill and Peter Hutson. In April 1980, Anglo Irish Meat Group purchased a meat plant at Bagenalstown, County Carlow, from Meade-Lonsdale for around £2.2m.

In June 1980 it was announced that Goodman would invest £10m for a new meat plant in Ardee, County Louth, employing 360 people "when it reaches full production". It also announced an additional £10m investment to expand operations at Cahir, Nenagh and Bagenalstown. In October 1980, Goodman bought Fermanagh Meats in Enniskillen for about £1.5m. The plant employed 60 people and processed about 1,000 head of cattle a week. By this time Goodman's meat empire was turning over about £100m a year.

In July 1981 it was announced that the IDA would put £2m towards the £9m expansion of Goodman's plants. One of his companies, Irish Agricultural Feed Co also built a feed manufacturing facility at Castlebellingham, and a complex to "over-winter up to 15,000 cattle to boost supplies to the factories at a time when few cattle are finished for slaughter". The complex "was the result of 14 years research" and cost £2m. By this time Anglo Irish Group employed some 700 people and turnover had reached £120m per year.

In January 1982 it was announced that Anglo Irish Beef Group had won a £25.5m contract to supply beef to Iraq. The contract involved supplying 9,000 tonnes of boneless consumer cuts and frozen bone-in meat and was part of an overall order for 54,000 tonnes of beef placed by Iraq.

In March 1983, AIBG acquired the four Northern Ireland factories of the animal by-products processors Robert Wilson for around £1m. By this stage AIBP was slaughtering more than 250,000 cattle a year, and 10,000 cattle were being fattened at Goodman's feeding lots in Louth. Later that year, in April 1983, he won contracts to supply $50m worth of fresh frozen beef to Iran and Morocco. At the time of the deal, Goodman complained that because there was no Variable Premium subsidy scheme in the UK, exporters there had an effective subsidy of $300 a tonne on beef exporters, thus enabling them to undercut Irish exporters. In September 1983 Goodman won a $33m contract to supply beef to Iran. Goodman praised then Minister for Agriculture Austin Deasy, whose visit to Tehran "greatly facilitated the securing of the new contract".

In December 1984 AIBP purchased the entire fresh meat division of Dalgety PLC, a publicly quoted UK group. It included facilities in York, Blisworth, Wellingborough and Reading, as well as distribution depots in Jersey and Berkshire. By this time turnover at Goodman had reached £300m a year. The purchased was followed by the acquisition of the Waterford plant of Clover Meats (after that company's collapse) for around £2m in February 1985. It includes the purchase of National Proteins, a by-products plant processing meat and bone meal from edible offal.

== Desmond and Mac Giolla allegations ==
On 9 March 1989, TDs Barry Desmond and Tomás Mac Giolla made a series of allegations about Goodman International in the Dáil. It emerged that the Minister for Agriculture had met Goodman on 19 October 1988 and Goodman had expressed interest in Irish Sugar – however, in a parliamentary question submitted by Des O'Malley just a month later, O'Kennedy denied any "discussions or negotiations" related to Goodman had taken place. Desmond indicated that the media had been subject to writs, and called for a tribunal of inquiry into the Goodman Group. In a March 1989 Irish Times story, Goodman International denied the allegations made by Desmond and Mac Giolla. Goodman said it was shocked by the allegations made and that they were "false and malicious comments". "The use of the privilege of the Dail to further this campaign against an Irish company is a matter of the gravest concern," the statement read.

== War in Iraq and emergency legislation ==
On 2 August 1990, Saddam Hussein ordered his troops to enter and occupy Kuwait. Initially the losses to the Goodman group and its bankers were estimated at £70m. By this time Goodman's companies accounted for 40% of the national beef kill, and had turnover in the region of £1 billion, almost all of it in exports. On 24 August 1990, share prices on the Irish Stock Exchange fell by £400m, with some of Goodman's companies including Food Industries (in which he held a 68% stake) falling from 170p to 110p.

By Friday, 24 August 1990 Taoiseach Charles Haughey recalled the Dáil for an emergency session to pass a section of the Companies Bill on Tuesday, 28 August. Haughey denied that the legislation was being enacted specifically to aid Goodman. The legislation allowed for the courts to appoint an examiner who could freeze company assets for up to 12 months – compared at the time to US Chapter 11 bankruptcy protection laws.

It later emerged that Goodman International was owed up to £180 million by Iraq and that the group owed over £400m to banks around the world – and that the group was "insolvent to the tune of somewhat under £100m". As the group holding company, Goodman International, was an unlimited company and Goodman was 98% owner, he could personally be called on to make good any shortfall owing to creditors.

== World in Action investigation ==
On 13 May 1991 Granada Television broadcast an episode of the investigative programme, World in Action with Susan O'Keeffe. The show examined the core business of Goodman International, how its operations were funded by national and European Community schemes, including export insurance and credit schemes, EC export subsidies and the variable premium paid on cattle. It claimed that the dominant position of Goodman in the Irish and British beef processing industry may not be in the best interests of consumers. It also made allegations of inappropriate political influence by Goodman. The programme featured Patrick McGuinness, a former Goodman accountant who had left the company and emigrated to Canada. The next day Opposition parties called for a full judicial inquiry into the allegations made on the programme.

Goodman said he would welcome any investigation from any source and that he would co-operate fully with it. He said he was astounded by the allegations made in the programme. He said that the malpractices alleged during the programme in relation to stamping and weighing meat had never been carried out in a "routine fashion", and if they had taken place they had done so without his knowledge or consent. He said systems that meant payment of £3 million in non-taxable wages to employees had existed but that this had been ended.

The Tribunal of Inquiry into the Beef Processing Industry, also known as the Beef Tribunal, was established on 31 May 1991, chaired by Justice Liam Hamilton. The Tribunal was tasked with

inquiring into the following definite matters of urgent public importance: (i) allegations regarding illegal activities, fraud and malpractice in and in connection with the beef processing industry made or referred to:-- (a) in Dáil Éireann, and (b) on a television programme transmitted by ITV on 13 May 1991; (ii) any matters connected with or relevant to the matters aforesaid which the Tribunal considers it necessary to investigate in connection with its inquiries into the matters mentioned at (i) above; and 2. making such recommendations (if any) as the Tribunal, having regard to its findings, thinks proper.

The Tribunal began hearings on 21 June 1991 and it reported its conclusions in July 1994, at the time the Irish State's longest running inquiry. The Tribunal was established by the then Fianna Fáil/Progressive Democrat coalition, though only after the leader of the PDs, Des O'Malley threatened to pull out of the coalition if no inquiry was established. Then Taoiseach Charles Haughey acquiesced to the demand.
