= Companies Act 2014 =

Oireachtas
- Signed by: Michael D. Higgins
- Commenced: 23 December 2014
- Status: In force

The Companies Act 2014 (No. 38 of 2014) was signed into law by President Michael D. Higgins on 23 December 2014 to regulate companies under Irish law. It was a consolidating and reforming piece of legislation, incorporating many of the provisions of the previous Companies Act 1963–2012 listed below.

== Previous Companies Acts ==
To facilitate easy citation of the entire body of law affecting companies, each of the acts prior to 2005 includes a collective citation section which enables them to be collectively cited as "The Companies Acts 1963 - [year of current enactment]". The Interpretation Act 2005 provided that the Companies Acts 1963 to 2001 may be referred to as "The Companies Acts". Legislation enacted subsequent to the Interpretation Act 2005 includes a section providing that "the Companies Acts and this Act shall be read as one" (e.g. Section 11 of the Companies (Amendment) Act 2009). Therefore, it was then appropriate to cite the entire body of legislation in Ireland affecting companies as "The Companies Acts".

- Companies Act 1963
- Companies (Amendment) Act 1977
- Companies (Amendment) Act 1982
- Companies (Amendment) Act 1983
- Designated Investment Funds Act 1985
- Companies (Amendment) Act 1986
- Companies (Amendment) Act 1990
- Companies Act 1990
- Companies (Amendment) Act 1999
- Companies (Amendment) (Number 2) Act 1999
- Company Law Enforcement Act 2001
- Companies (Auditing and Accounting) Act 2003
- Companies (Amendment) Act 2009
- Companies (Amendment) Act 2012

== Types of companies ==
The act introduced a revised framework of company types, replacing the single form of private limited company that had existed under the previous acts. The principal types are:

- Private Company Limited by Shares (Ltd) — the default and most common company type. An Ltd has a simplified single constitutional document (replacing the previous memorandum and articles of association), may have as few as one director, is not required to hold an annual general meeting, and has unlimited corporate capacity — meaning it is no longer required to state its objects or purpose in its constitution.
- Designated Activity Company (DAC) — the closest equivalent to the old-style private limited company, intended for companies that wish to restrict themselves to a specific stated purpose. DACs retain an objects clause and must hold an AGM.
- Company Limited by Guarantee (CLG) — a company with members rather than shareholders, commonly used by charities, sports clubs, and management companies. The act extended the audit exemption to CLGs and reduced the minimum membership requirement from seven to one, though CLGs must still have at least two directors.
- Public Limited Company (PLC)

Unlimited companies, and other specialist forms were also retained and updated under the act.
