= Cahergall =

- An Chathair Gheal (Irish)
- Cahergal
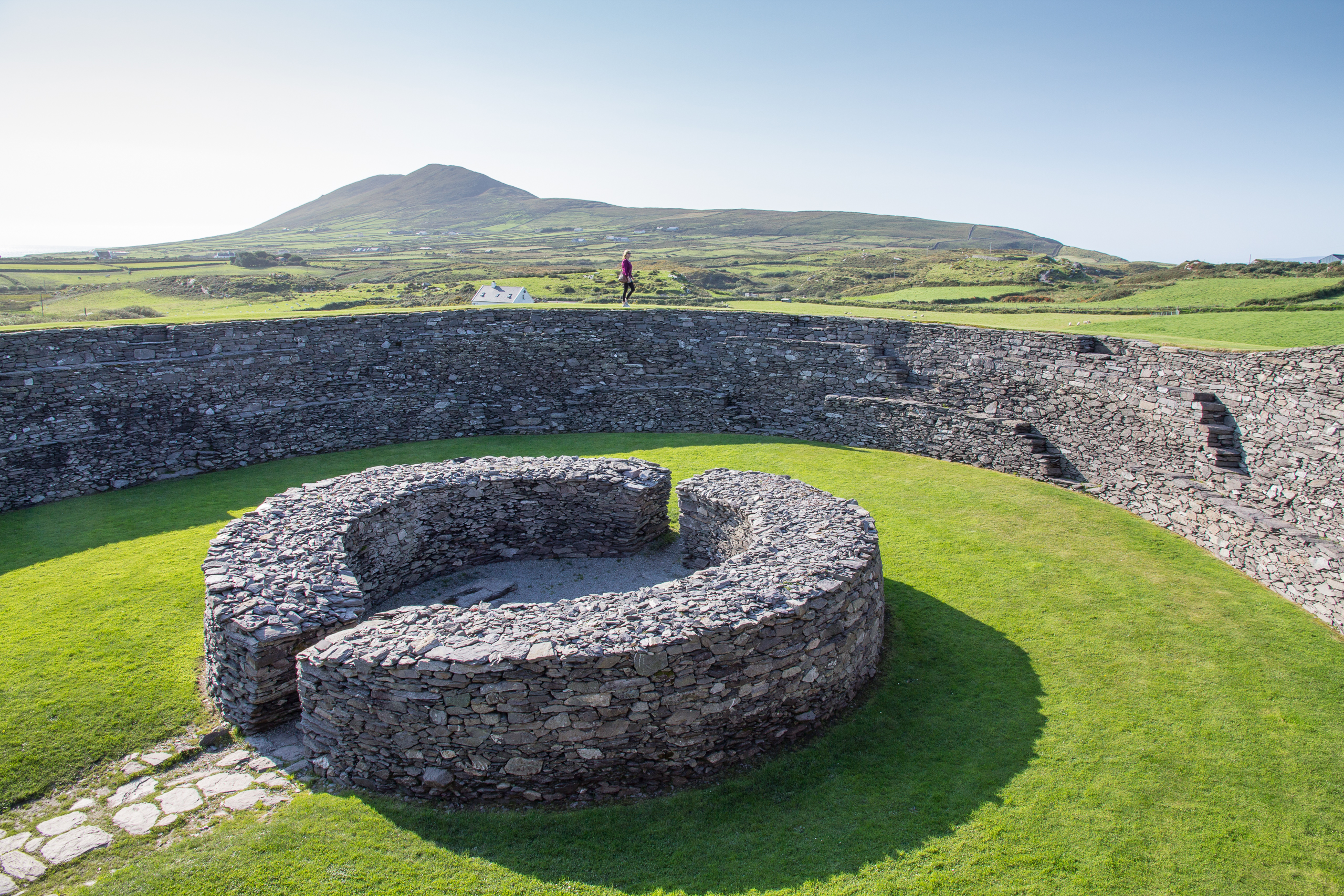
- Inside view of Cahergall

- Location within Ireland
- 51.955977°N 10.257733°W
- Type: stone ringfort
- Location: Kimego West, Caherciveen, County Kerry, Ireland

History
- Built: c. 7th century AD

Site notes
- Elevation: 20 m (66 ft)
- Architectural style: Gaelic Ireland
- Owner: State

National monument of Ireland
- Official name: Cahergall Cashel
- Reference no.: 227

Cahergall, sometimes spelled Cahergal, is a stone ringfort (cashel) and National Monument located in County Kerry, Ireland.

== Location ==
Cahergall is located immediately southeast of Leacanabuaile, 2.7 km (1.7 mi) northwest of Cahirciveen.

== History ==
The cashel was built around the 7th century AD as a defended farmstead.

== Description ==
This is a circular stone ringfort (caiseal) of internal diameter 25 m (82 ft) with outer walls 4 m (13 ft) high and 5 m (16 ft) thick.

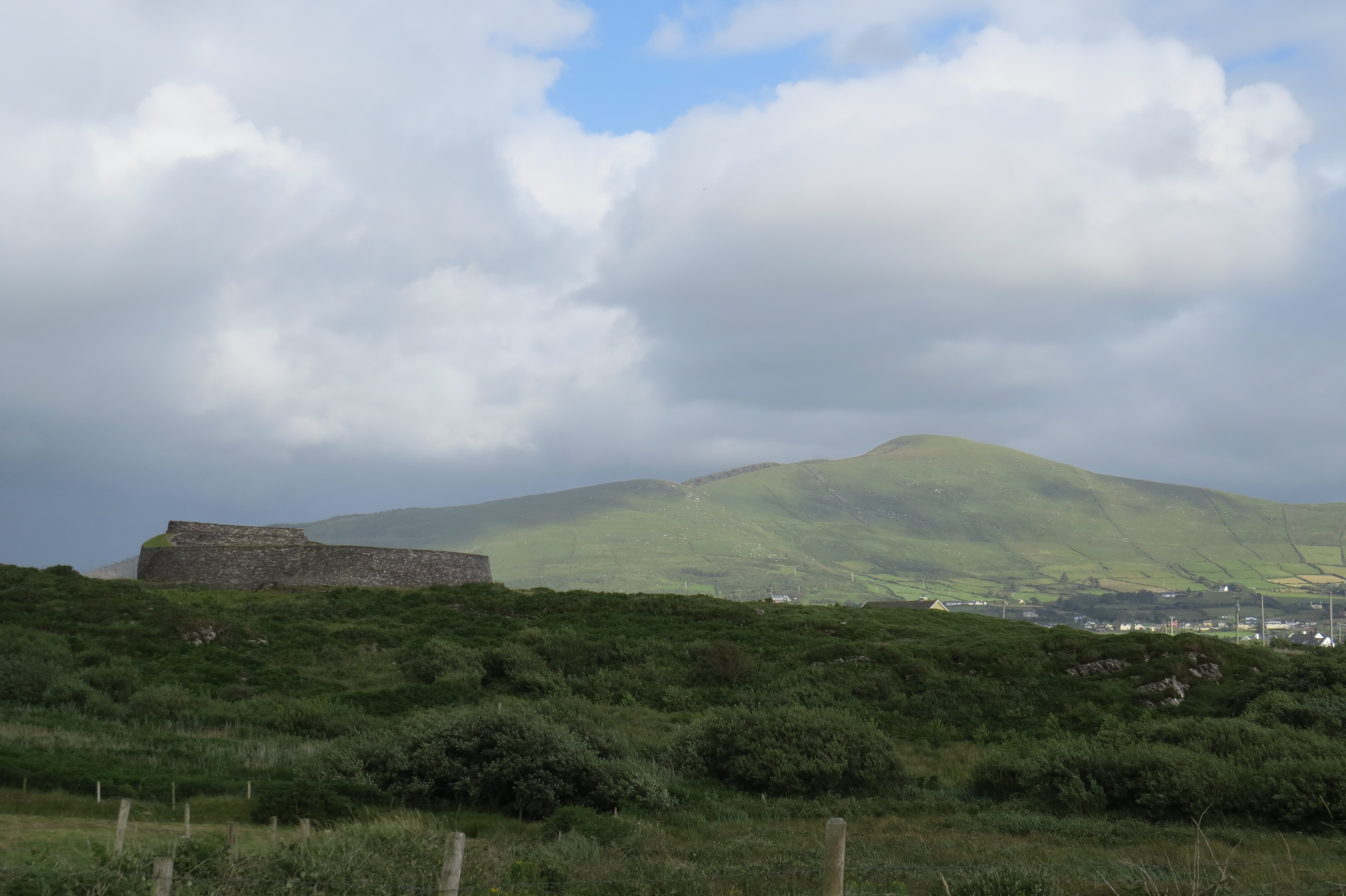
Exterior view of the cashel

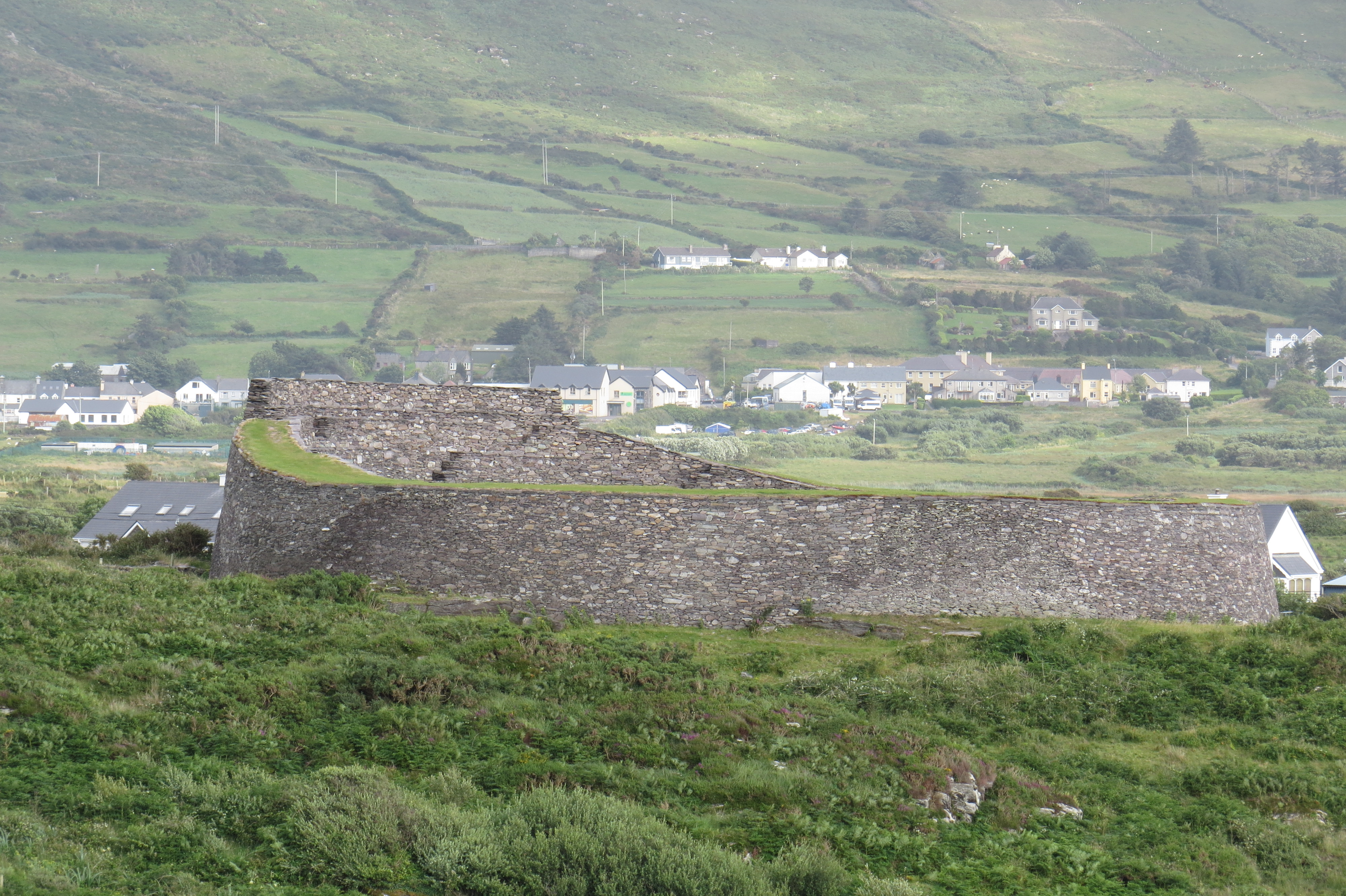
Another outside view

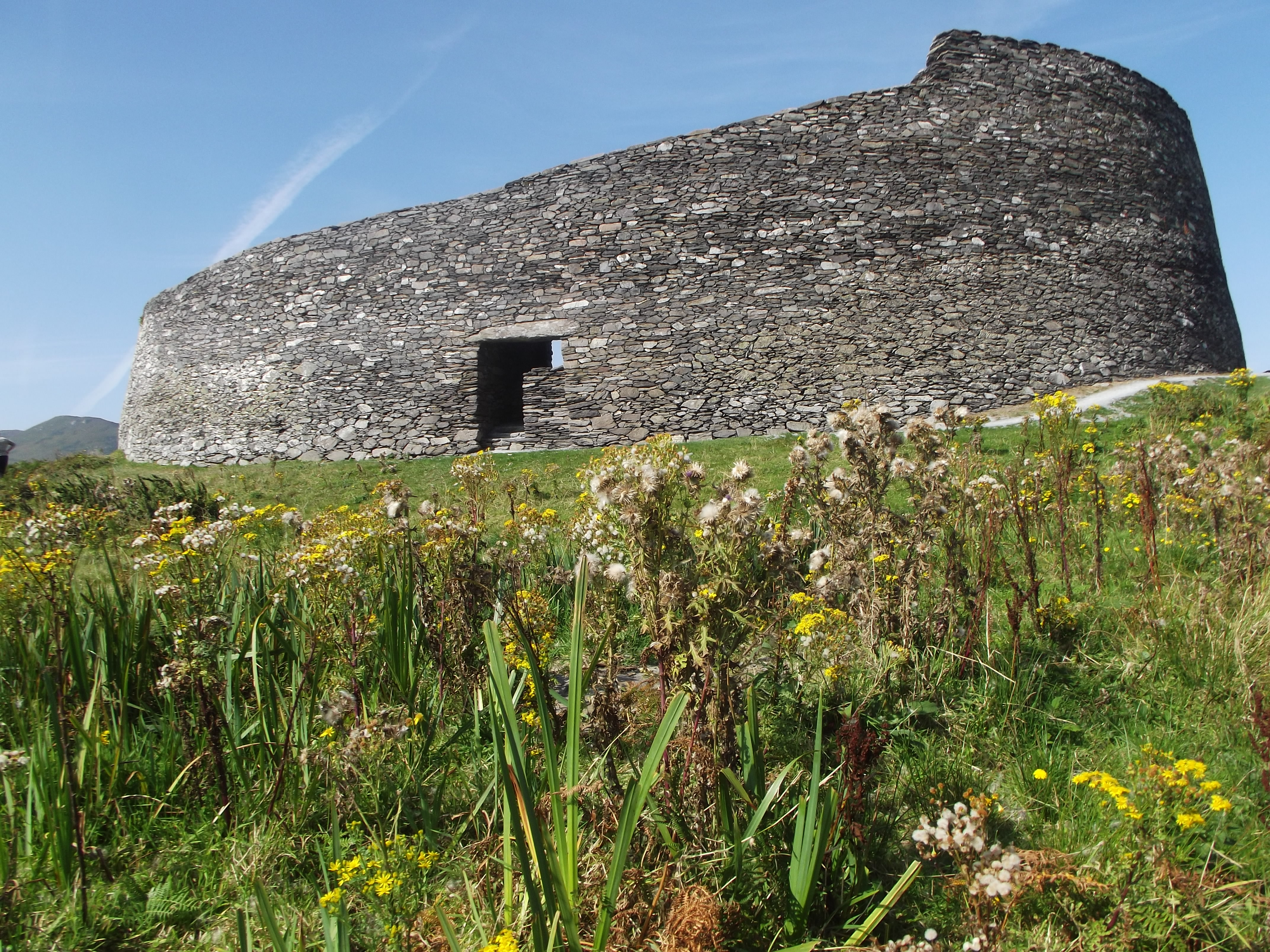
Entrance gateway

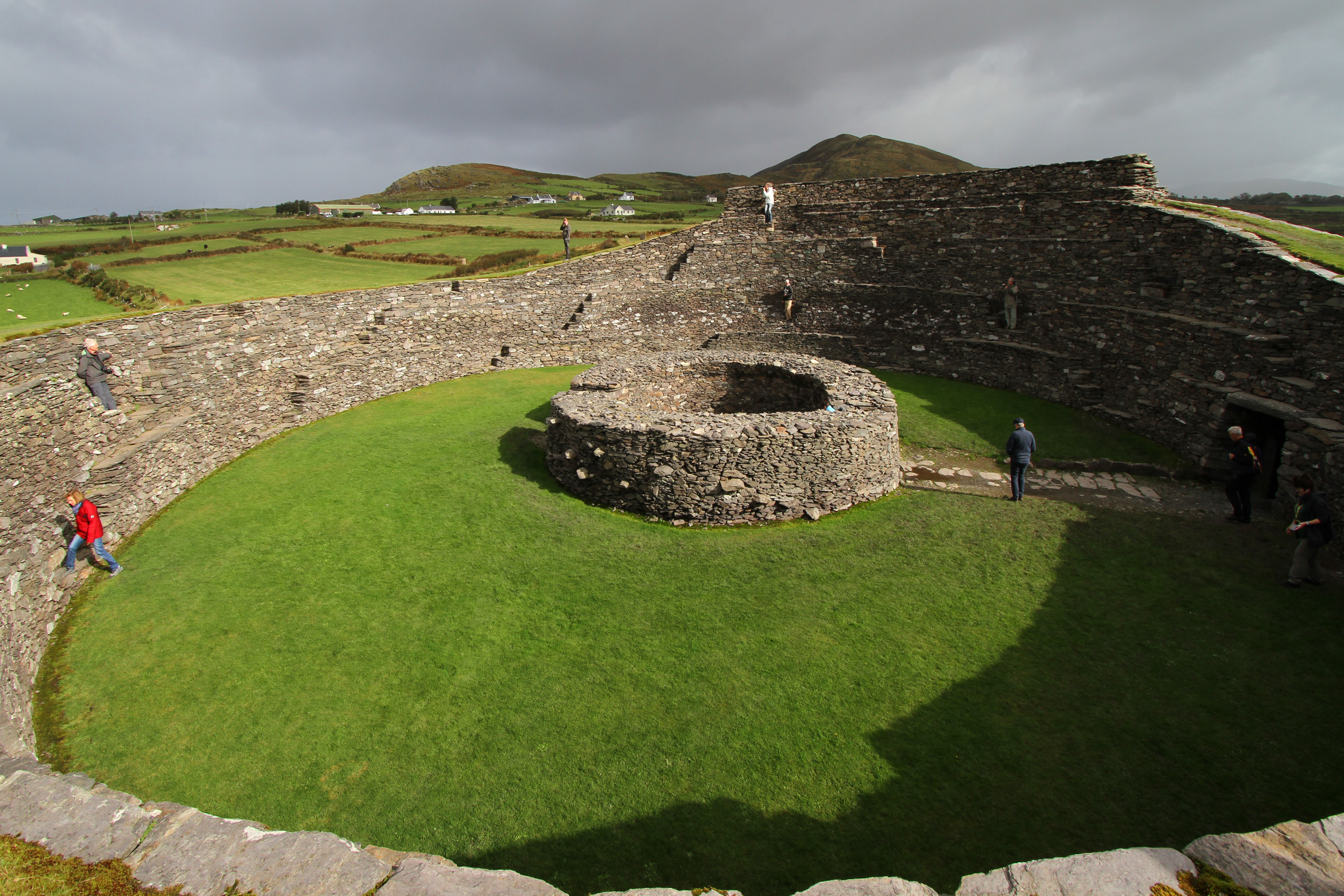
Inside view of the cashel

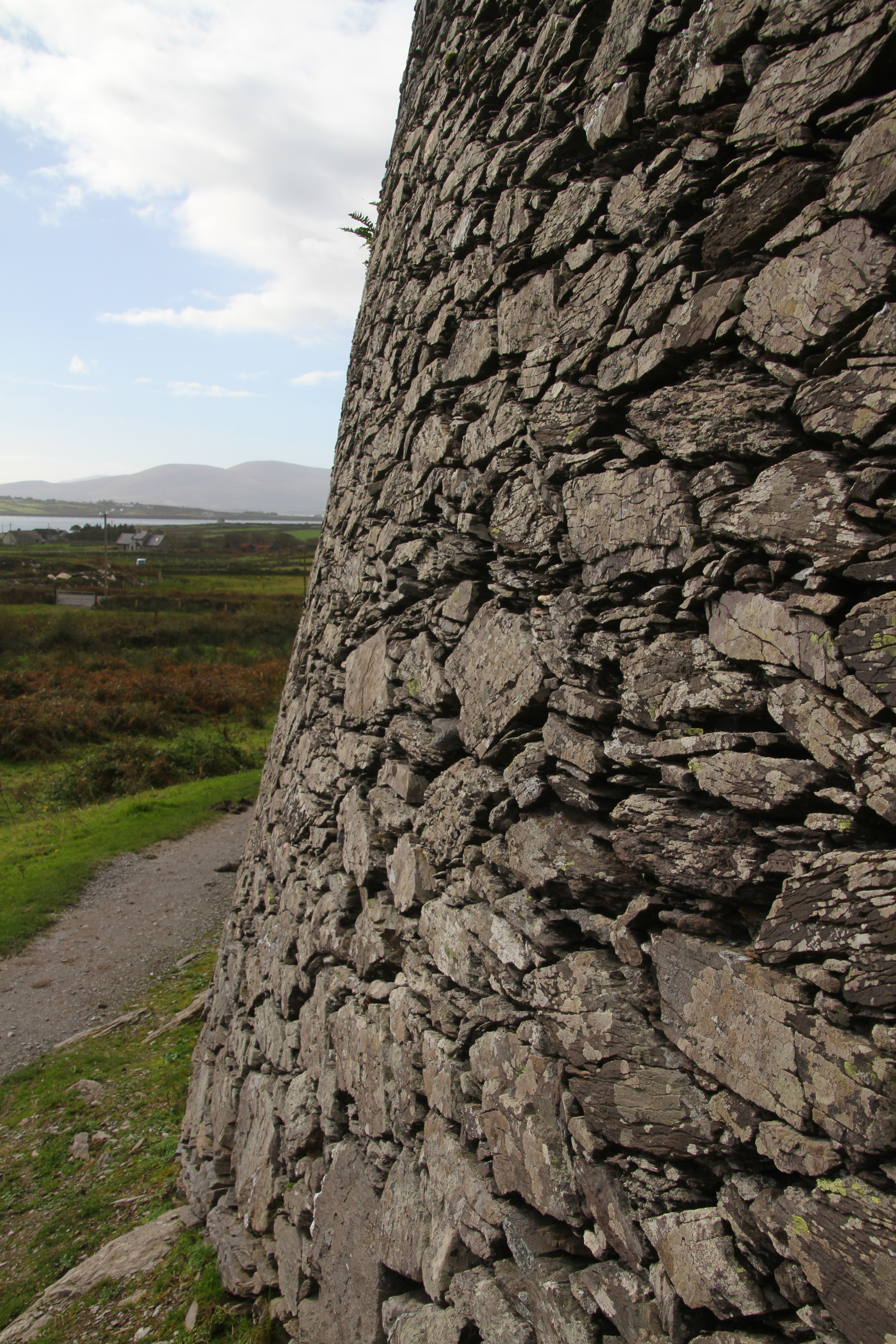
Wall
