= Leacanabuaile =

- Leaca na Buaile (Irish)
- Location within Ireland
- 51.958258°N 10.261868°W
- Type: stone ringfort
- Location: Kimego West, Caherciveen, County Kerry, Ireland

History
- Built: c. 9th century AD

Site notes
- Elevation: 24 m (79 ft)
- Architectural style: Gaelic Ireland
- Owner: State

National monument of Ireland
- Official name: Leacanabuaile Cashel
- Reference no.: 414

Leacanabuaile is a stone ringfort (cashel) and National Monument in County Kerry, Ireland. Leacanabuaile is immediately northwest of Cahergal, 3 km (1.9 mi) northwest of Cahirciveen.

== History ==
The cashel was built around the 9th century AD as a defended farmstead.

The Irish name means "hillside of the milking-place".

The site was excavated in 1939–40; objects found included iron knives and pins, bone combs, bronze, millstones, and lead, dating from the 9th or 10th century AD.

== Description ==
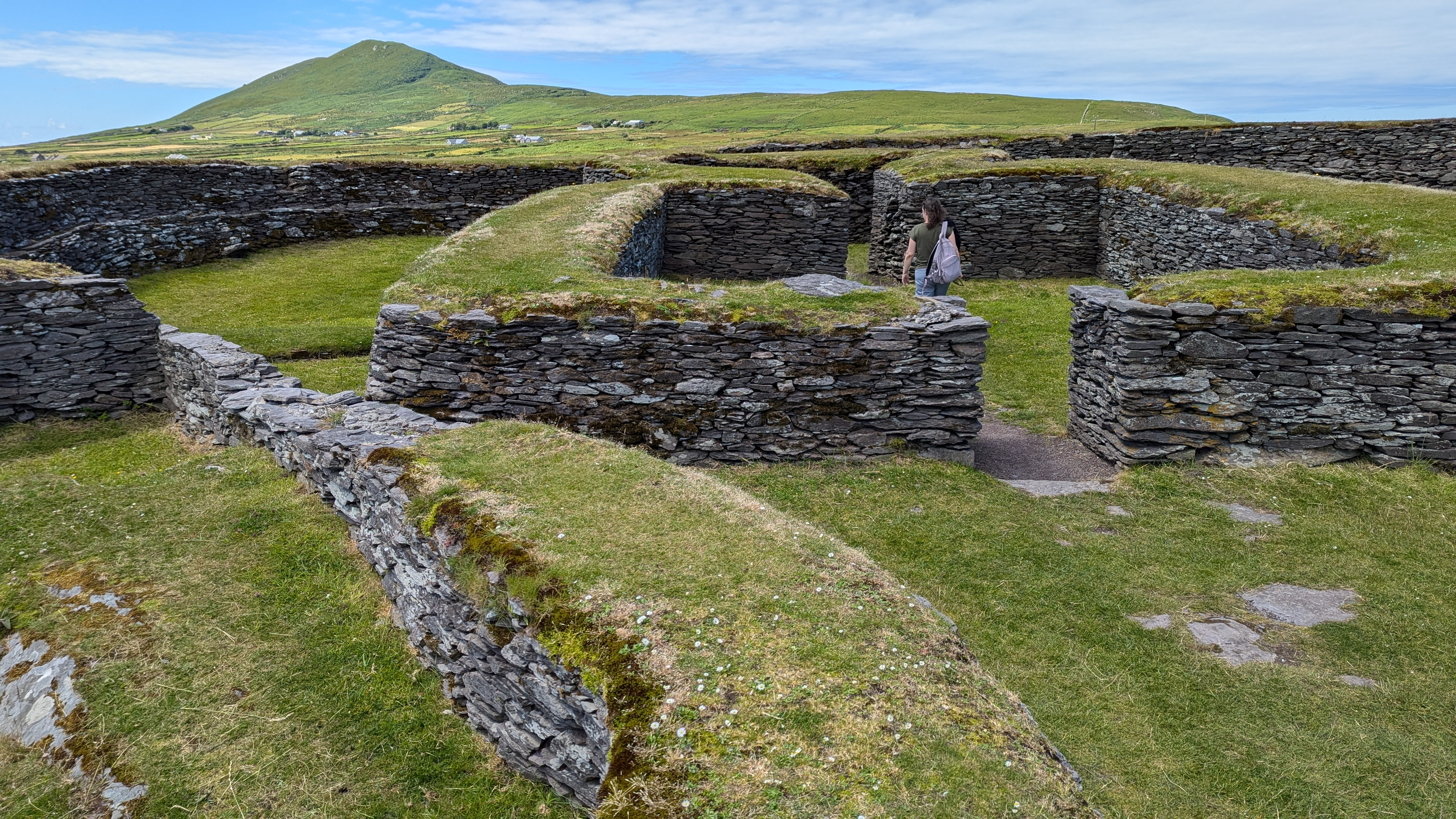
Internal walls inside Leacanabuile ring fort

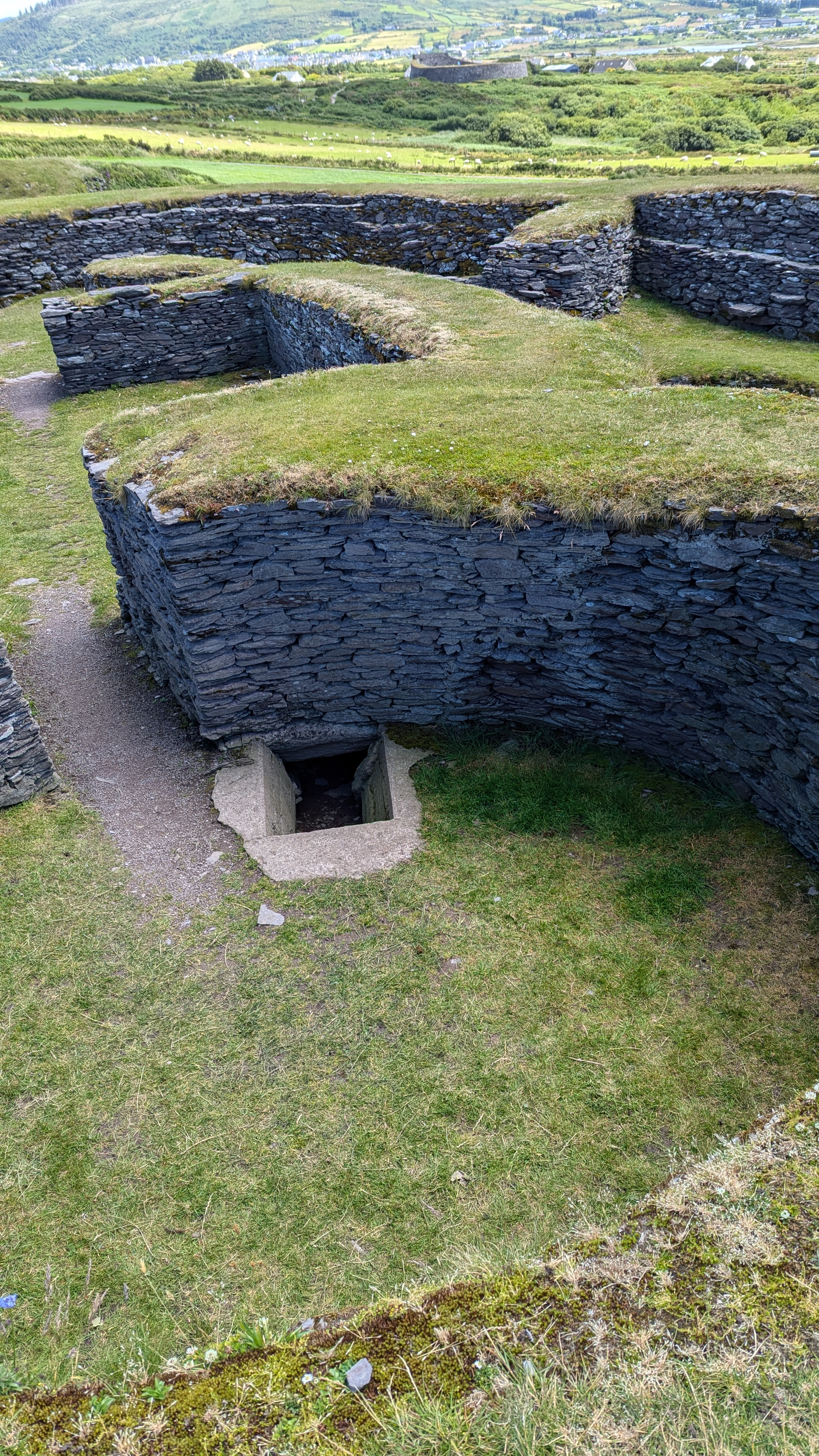
Leacanabuile, internal walls and entrance to souterrain

Leacanabuaile is a circular stone ringfort (caiseal) of internal diameter 30 m (98 ft) with outer walls over 2 m (6 ft 7 in) high and 3.3 m (11 ft) thick. Protected on three sides by steep grassy slopes, the entrance is on the east side. It is built of drystone with gaps filled in with rubble.

Inside are three stone beehive houses and a souterrain.
