= Cahersiveen =

Town in County Kerry, Ireland

Cahersiveen Cathair Saidhbhín (Irish)
- Town
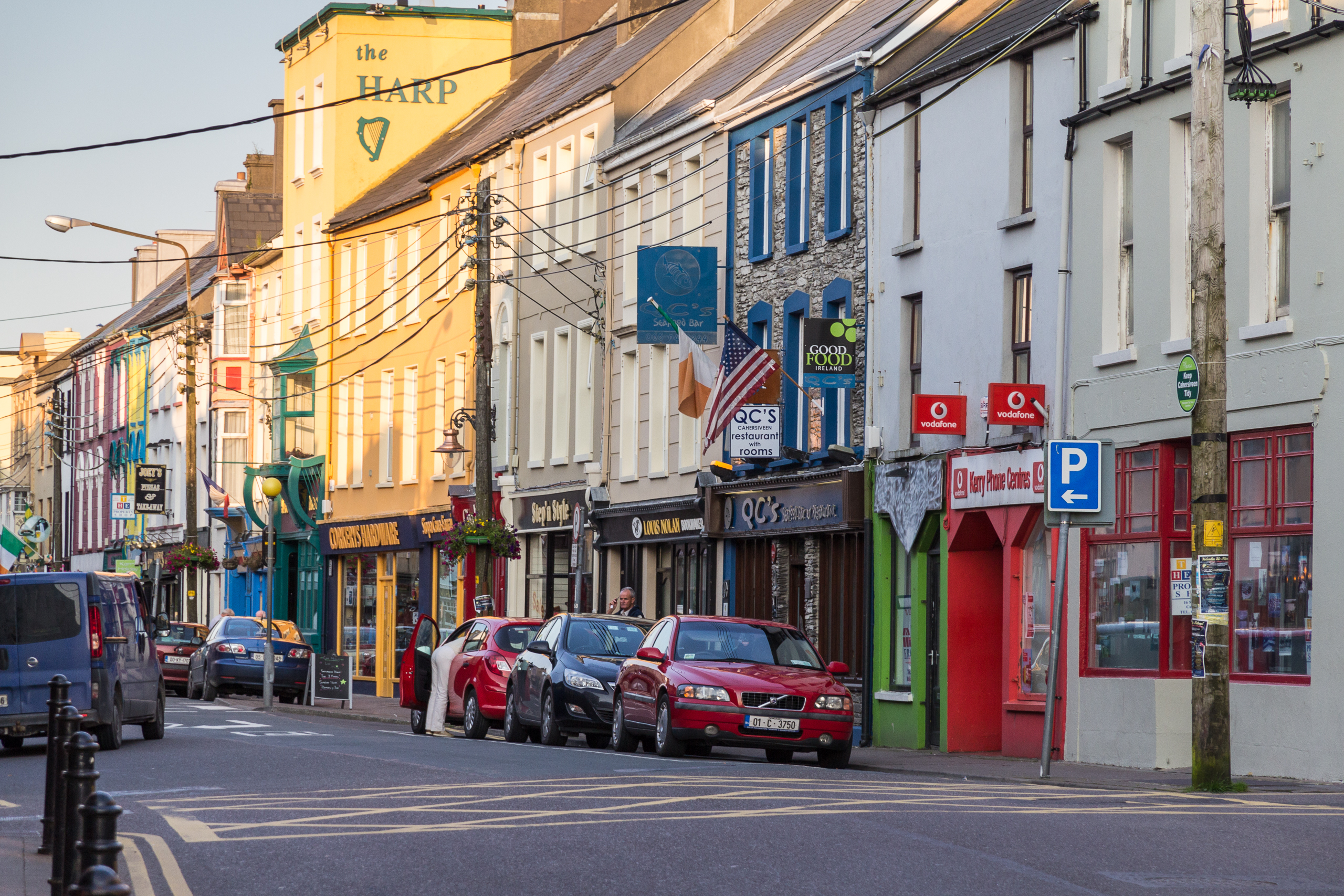
- Main Street

- Location in Ireland
- Coordinates: 51.948°N 10.224°W
- Country: Ireland
- Province: Munster
- County: County Kerry
- Elevation: 79 m (259 ft)

Population (2022)
  - Total: 1,297
- Irish Grid Reference: V469795

Historical population
Year	Pop.	±%
1831	1,192	—
1841	1,492	+25.2%
1851	1,862	+24.8%
1861	1,802	−3.2%
1871	1,925	+6.8%
1881	2,003	+4.1%
1891	1,987	−0.8%
1901	2,013	+1.3%
1911	1,896	−5.8%
1926	1,773	−6.5%
1936	1,680	−5.2%
1946	1,779	+5.9%
1951	1,687	−5.2%
1956	1,801	+6.8%
1961	1,659	−7.9%
1966	1,649	−0.6%
1971	1,547	−6.2%
1981	1,428	−7.7%
1986	1,310	−8.3%
1991	1,213	−7.4%
1996	1,250	+3.1%
2002	1,272	+1.8%
2006	1,294	+1.7%
2011	1,168	−9.7%
2016	1,041	−10.9%
2022	1,297	+24.6%

Cahersiveen (Irish: Cathair Saidhbhín, meaning 'Little Sadhbh's stone ringfort'), sometimes Cahirciveen, is a town in the south-west of Ireland, in County Kerry. As of the 2022 census, it had a population of 1,297.

== Geography ==
Cahersiveen is on the slopes of 376-metre-high Bentee, and on the lower course of the River Ferta. It is the principal settlement of the Iveragh Peninsula, near Valentia Island. The town is 50 km west of Killarney.

== History ==
Evidence of ancient settlement in the area includes a number of ring fort, holy well, ring barrow, and castle sites in the townlands of Cahersiveen, Garranebane and Carhan. These include the stone forts of Cahergall and Leacanabuaile, which stand close to each other a short distance from the town. The ruins of Ballycarbery Castle, a 16th century tower house that was extended into an L-shape plan, are also nearby.

In 1597, the Iveragh estate was received by Trinity College, Dublin as part of a royal grant. It previously belonged to the Earl of Desmond. The 8,808 acre estate stretched from Killorglin all the way to Valentia incorporating the parishes of Glenbegh, Killinane, Cahir, Killemlagh, Dromod, Prior and Valentia.

The Scottish civil engineer Alexander Nimmo first visited Cahersiveen in 1811 as sent by the Bog Commission. He noted the lack of development, and poverty, in the estate, and that the main road to the area was unpassable by carriage at that time. Over the next few years, whilst planning the bogs of the estate he also designed many road and bridge plans. The most notable of these was the main road through Iveragh into the town built in 1822.

It was here the first shots of the Fenian Rising were fired in 1867.

Cahersiveen was the site of the murder of five local men taken in the early hours of the morning from Bahaghs Workhouse where they were held prisoner, shot in the legs then blown up with a landmine on 12 March 1923 during the Civil War.

Cahersiveen was designated as a "Gaeltacht Service Town" in June 2023, when the then Minister of State Patrick O'Donovan launched the "Cathair Saidhbhín Language Plan" alongside Kerry County Council.

== Places of interest ==
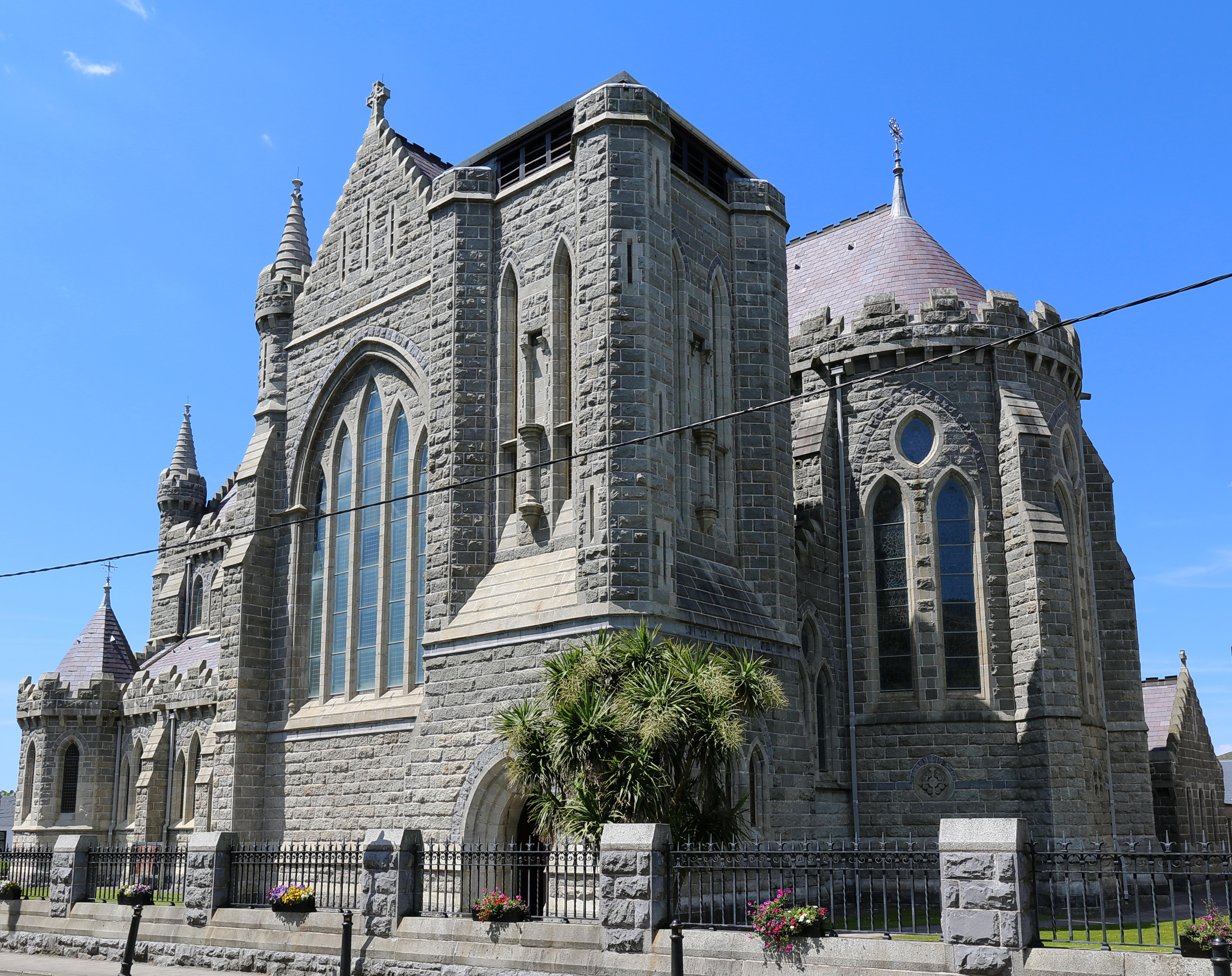
Daniel O'Connell Memorial Church

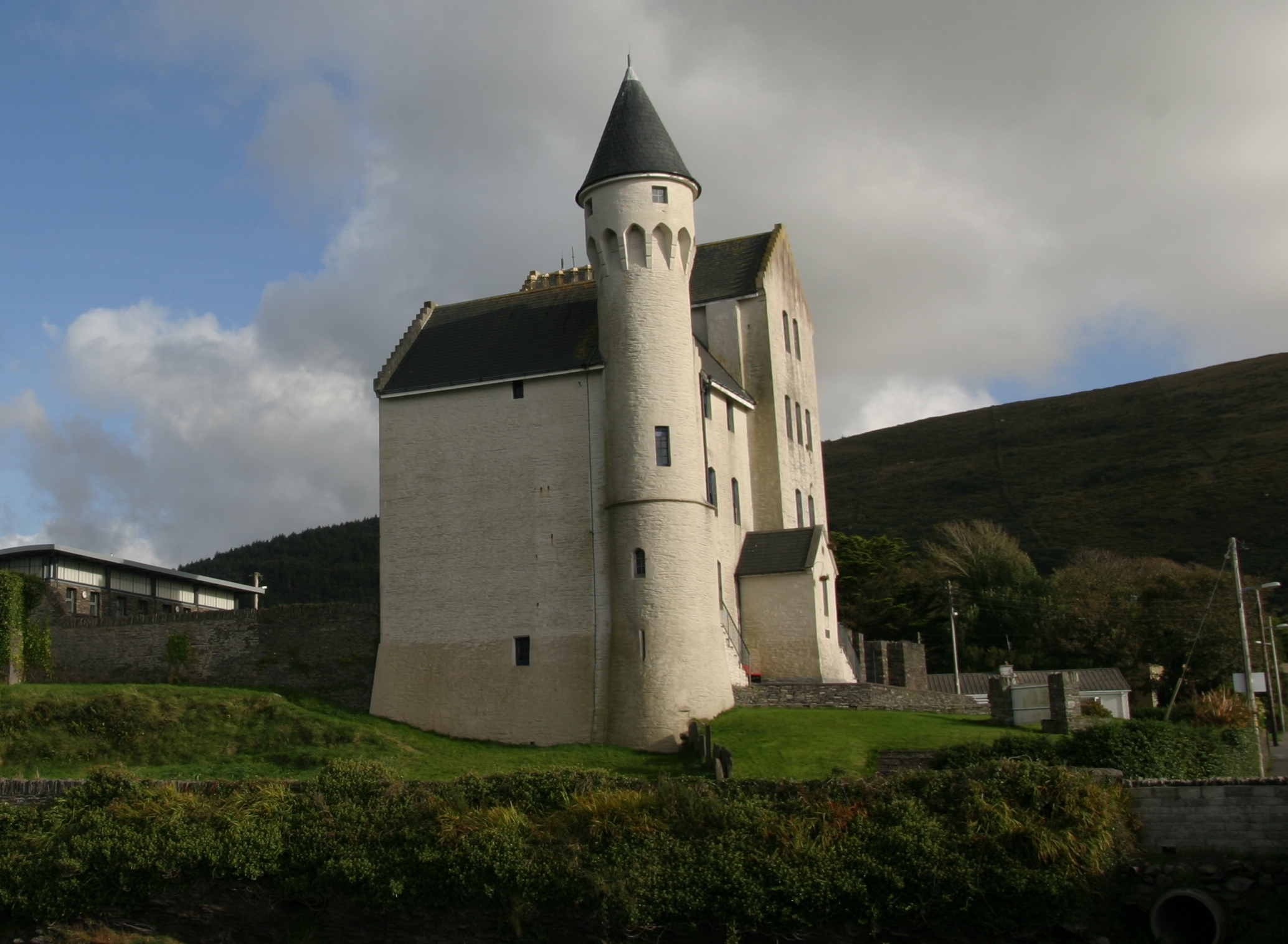
Royal Irish Constabulary barracks in Cahersiveen

The Catholic church in the town, built between 1888 and 1902, is one of few Catholic churches named after a layperson. Dedicated to Daniel O'Connell, the church grounds contain a memorial to O'Connell which face his birthplace at Carhan near Cahersiveen.

The decommissioned Royal Irish Constabulary barracks, dating to the 1870s and now a heritage centre, was built in the distinctive "Schloss" style favoured by its architect, Enoch Trevor Owen. Because of this, it is often claimed to have been mistakenly built from the plans for a British barracks in India – a common myth heard in some other Irish garrison towns.

The town falls within the Kerry International Dark-Sky Reserve, the first Gold Tier Reserve in the northern hemisphere and one of only three Gold Tier Dark-Sky Reserves globally.

== Transport ==
Cahersiveen is connected to the Irish road network by the N70 national secondary road.

The area was served from 1893 to 1960 by the Cahersiveen railway station on the Great Southern and Western Railway.

As of 2024, a number of Local Link buses connect Cahersiveen to other towns and villages in the area, with some services to Killorglin, Killarney and Tralee.

== Education ==
The town's primary school, Scoil Saidhbhín, opened in September 2015. This is an amalgamation of Scoil Mhuire, a boys' primary school and St Joseph's Convent, a girls' primary school. There are four primaries in the parish of Cahersiveen, including those in the town's hinterland: Aghatubrid National School, Coars National School, and Foilmore National School. Aghatubrid was established in 1964 and as of 2019 had about 75 students.

Coláiste na Sceilge is the town's co-educational secondary school. An tAonad Lán-Ghaeilge is an all Irish-speaking class for 1st to 3rd-year students, where students do all their learning through Irish.

== In literature ==
Patrick O'Brian's novel Post Captain gives Cahersiveen as the location of the character Stephen Maturin's childhood home in Ireland.

At present two Highlanders were talking slowly to an Irishman in Gaelic ... as he lay there on his stomach to ease his flayed back. 'I follow them best when I do not attend at all,' observed Stephen, 'it is the child in long clothes that understands, myself in Cahirciveen."

Cahirciveen is also the name given to the central city in Brian Moore's futuristic novel Catholics.

== Notable people ==
- Cornelius Casey (1929–2001) – footballer who represented the United States national team
- Sigerson Clifford (1913–1985) – poet and playwright
- Jerry Grogan – stadium announcer for Gaelic football at Croke Park
- Daniel O'Connell (1775–1847) – member of parliament and the political leader of Ireland's Roman Catholic majority
- Hugh O'Flaherty (1898–1963) – Catholic priest and a significant figure in the Catholic resistance to Nazi Germany

== Gallery ==
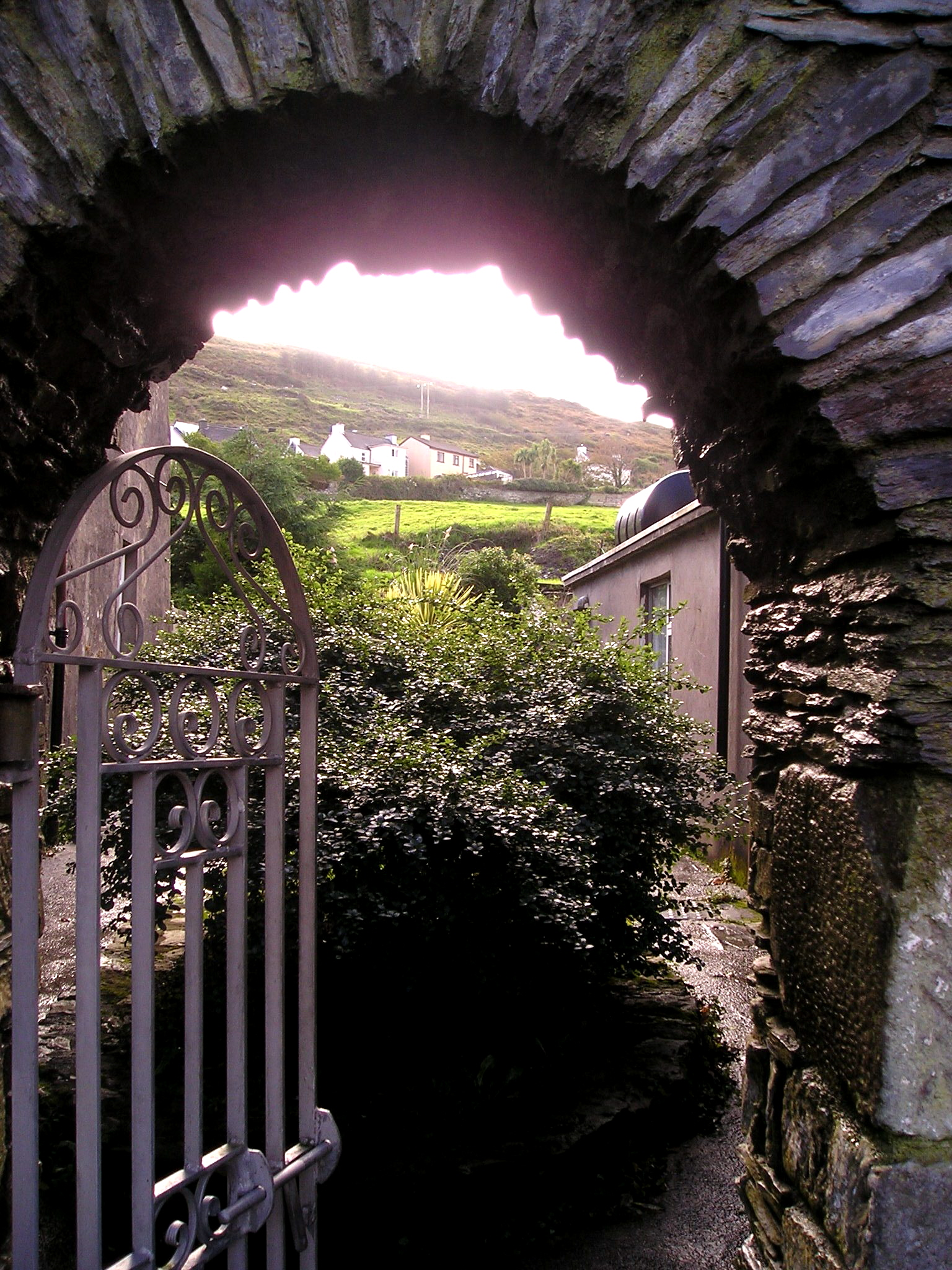
Gate to Holy Well on New Street

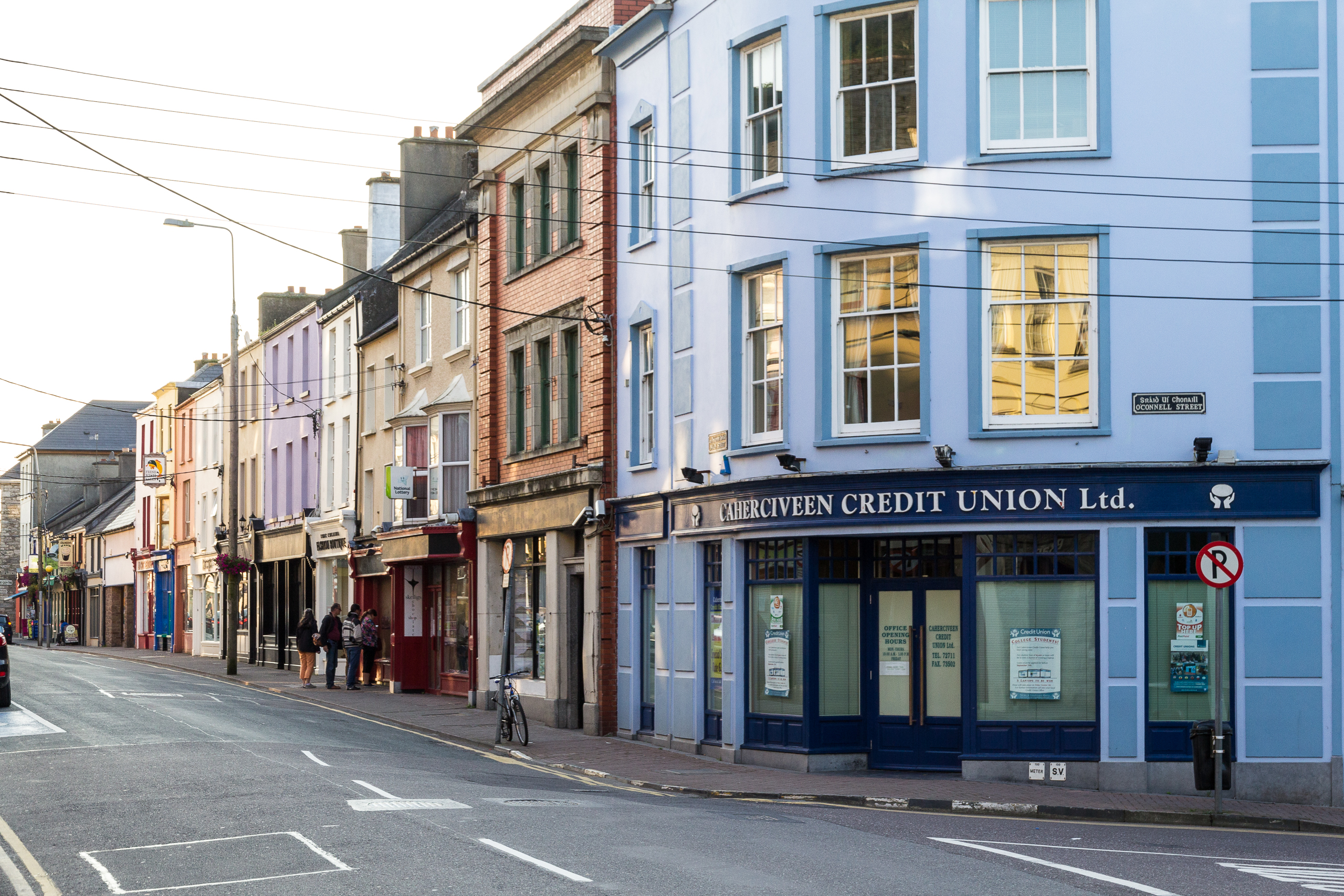
Corner of Main Street and O'Connell Street

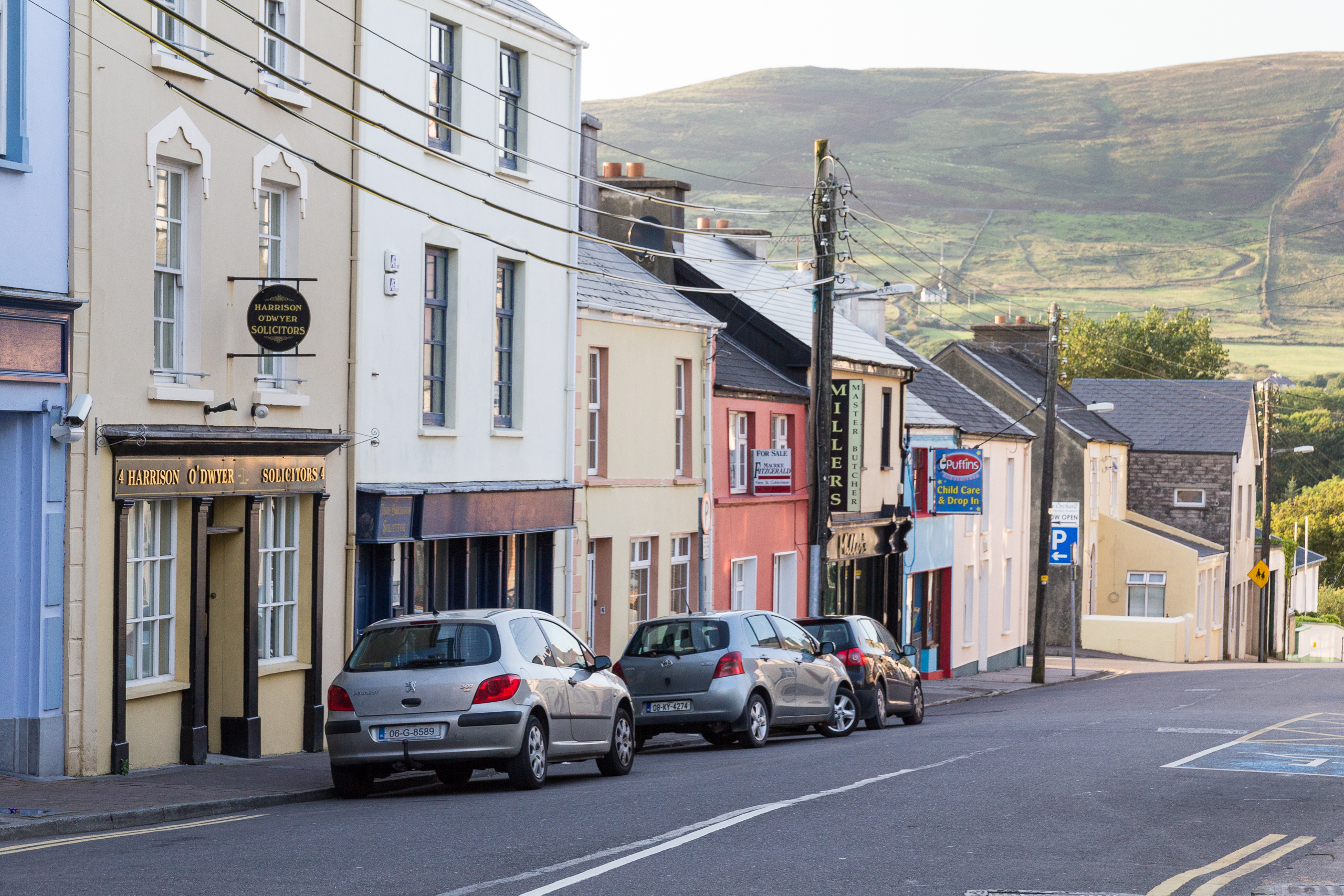
O'Connell Street

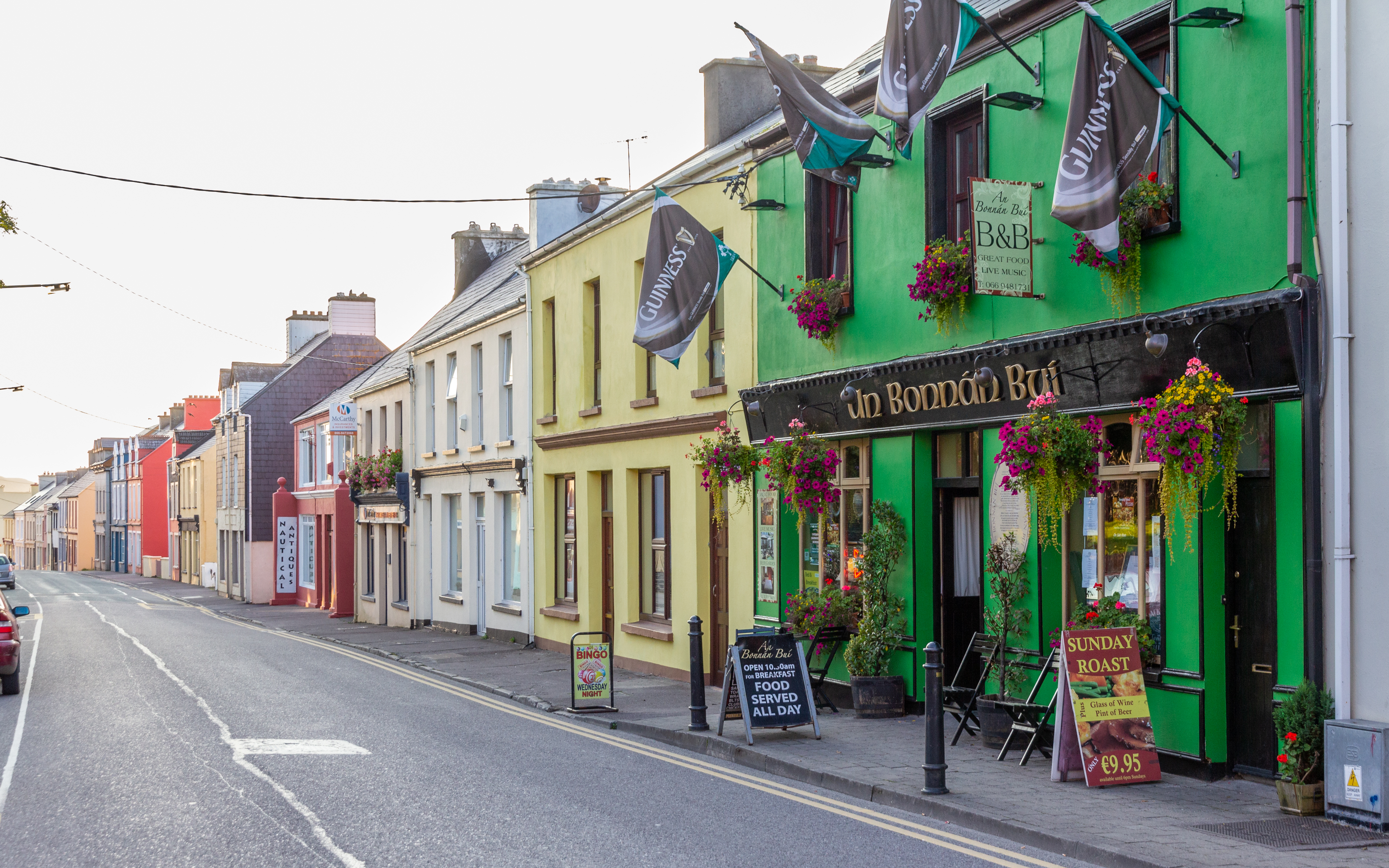
West Main Street

== See also ==
- List of towns and villages in Ireland
- Market Houses in Ireland
