= Seventeenth Amendment of the Constitution of Ireland =

Amendment on cabinet confidentiality

- 30 October 1997
- Relating to cabinet confidentiality

Results
Choice	Votes	%
Yes	632,777	52.65%
No	569,175	47.35%
Valid votes	1,201,952	94.79%
Invalid or blank votes	66,091	5.21%
Total votes	1,268,043	100.00%
Registered voters/turnout	2,688,316	47.17%

The Seventeenth Amendment of the Constitution Act 1997 amended the Constitution of Ireland to provide that the confidentiality of meetings of the cabinet would not prevent the High Court from ordering that certain information be disclosed when this was in the public interest. It was approved by referendum on 30 October 1997 and signed into law on 14 November of the same year.

== Changes to the text ==
Inserted a new subsection in Article 28.4:

3° The confidentiality of discussions at meetings of the Government shall be respected in all circumstances save only where the High Court determines that disclosure should be made in respect of a particular matter-

i. in the interests of the administration of justice by a Court, or
ii. by virtue of an overriding public interest, pursuant to an application in that behalf by a tribunal appointed by the Government or a Minister of the Government on the authority of the Houses of the Oireachtas to inquire into a matter stated by them to be of public importance.

The existing subsection 3° of Article 28.4 was renumbered as subsection 4°.

== Overview ==
In 1992, during the Beef Tribunal, the Supreme Court ruled that, as the constitution stood, the confidentiality of meetings of the Government (the cabinet) was unbreachable and absolute. The court derived its ruling from Article 28.4.2°, which requires that the Government observe the principle of collective responsibility. The purpose of the Seventeenth Amendment was to allow cabinet confidentiality to be relaxed in certain circumstances.

The amendment was adopted during the Fianna Fáil–Progressive Democrats coalition government led by Bertie Ahern but had been first drafted and suggested by the previous Fine Gael–Labour Party–Democratic Left government led by John Bruton. The amendment, therefore, had the support of all major parties. The referendum occurred on the same day as the 1997 presidential election.

== Result ==
Seventeenth Amendment of the Constitution of Ireland referendum
Choice	Votes	%
For	632,777	52.65
Against	569,175	47.35
Total	1,201,952	100.00
Valid votes	1,201,952	94.79
Invalid/blank votes	66,091	5.21
Total votes	1,268,043	100.00
Registered voters/turnout	2,688,316	47.17

Results by constituency
Constituency	Electorate	Turnout (%)	Votes		Proportion of votes	
Constituency	Electorate	Turnout (%)	Yes	No	Yes	No
Carlow–Kilkenny	83,916	51.3%	21,487	19,073	53.0%	47.0%
Cavan–Monaghan	81,914	48.7%	22,232	14,827	60.0%	40.0%
Clare	69,756	50.0%	18,211	14,578	55.6%	44.4%
Cork East	62,721	53.1%	16,833	14,620	53.6%	46.4%
Cork North-Central	70,864	45.8%	15,073	15,838	48.8%	51.2%
Cork North-West	46,369	60.3%	14,086	11,787	54.5%	45.5%
Cork South-Central	82,981	52.8%	20,515	21,319	49.1%	50.9%
Cork South-West	47,439	57.8%	14,480	11,104	56.6%	43.4%
Donegal North-East	51,725	39.8%	10,679	8,596	55.5%	44.5%
Donegal South-West	50,878	41.7%	11,575	8,339	58.2%	41.8%
Dublin Central	63,046	34.6%	11,032	9,907	52.7%	47.3%
Dublin North	62,885	46.7%	14,887	13,524	52.4%	47.6%
Dublin North-Central	65,756	47.4%	14,981	15,119	49.8%	50.2%
Dublin North-East	58,785	42.0%	12,123	11,706	50.9%	49.1%
Dublin North-West	59,677	39.8%	11,780	11,149	51.4%	48.6%
Dublin South	88,522	50.5%	20,171	23,043	46.7%	53.3%
Dublin South-Central	67,138	42.5%	13,684	13,771	49.9%	50.1%
Dublin South-East	62,149	45.6%	11,794	15,417	43.4%	56.6%
Dublin South-West	74,929	34.8%	13,554	11,512	54.1%	45.9%
Dublin West	65,552	40.0%	13,070	12,205	51.8%	48.2%
Dún Laoghaire	85,557	48.9%	19,069	21,346	47.2%	52.8%
Galway East	59,992	51.3%	16,019	12,628	56.0%	44.0%
Galway West	76,169	45.8%	16,437	16,239	50.4%	49.6%
Kerry North	50,742	45.2%	11,104	10,317	51.9%	48.1%
Kerry South	46,991	48.3%	11,623	9,490	55.1%	44.9%
Kildare North	50,590	45.4%	11,371	10,755	51.4%	48.6%
Kildare South	46,893	42.6%	10,284	8,875	53.7%	46.3%
Laois–Offaly	83,027	49.8%	21,083	17,852	54.2%	45.8%
Limerick East	75,739	46.9%	16,213	17,558	48.1%	51.9%
Limerick West	46,628	52.5%	12,106	10,567	53.4%	46.6%
Longford–Roscommon	62,200	52.4%	16,281	14,268	53.3%	46.7%
Louth	70,584	44.4%	16,725	13,191	56.0%	44.0%
Mayo	85,178	48.7%	21,593	17,366	55.5%	44.5%
Meath	88,283	44.4%	20,299	16,981	54.5%	45.5%
Sligo–Leitrim	63,230	50.7%	16,726	13,381	55.6%	44.4%
Tipperary North	52,237	54.4%	14,140	12,335	53.5%	46.5%
Tipperary South	50,927	52.7%	13,496	11,887	53.2%	46.8%
Waterford	68,548	45.9%	16,369	13,322	55.2%	44.8%
Westmeath	47,080	48.8%	11,600	10,086	53.5%	46.5%
Wexford	82,570	47.7%	20,215	16,992	54.4%	45.6%
Wicklow	78,149	45.6%	17,777	16,305	52.2%	47.8%
Total	2,688,316	47.2%	632,777	569,175	52.7%	47.3%

== See also ==
- Cabinet (government)
- Politics of the Republic of Ireland
- History of the Republic of Ireland
- Constitutional amendment
