= Beef Tribunal =

1991–1994 Irish tribunal of inquiry into the beef processing industry

- Date: 31 May 1991 – 29 July 1994
- Location: Dublin, Ireland
- Also known as: Tribunal of Inquiry into the Beef Processing Industry
- Participants: Judge Liam Hamilton

The Tribunal of Inquiry into the Beef Processing Industry, commonly known as the Beef Tribunal, was an Irish tribunal of inquiry established in 1991 to investigate allegations of fraud, malpractice, tax evasion and regulatory failures in the Irish beef-processing industry. The inquiry was chaired by the President of the High Court, Mr Justice Liam Hamilton, as its sole member.

The inquiry arose from allegations made in Dáil Éireann during the late 1980s and early 1990s and from an edition of the British investigative television programme World in Action, broadcast on 13 May 1991, concerning the activities of the beef-processing industry and particularly companies controlled by businessman Larry Goodman.

The tribunal examined, among other matters, the operation of European Community beef intervention and export-refund schemes, tax evasion within beef companies, the allocation of State export-credit insurance for beef exports to Iraq, the activities of the Industrial Development Authority, the conduct of regulatory authorities and allegations that political influence had been exercised on behalf of individual processors.

Its public hearings concluded in July 1993 and its 903-page report was delivered to the Minister for Agriculture on 29 July 1994.

The tribunal substantiated a number of serious allegations, including organised tax evasion within Goodman companies and abuses involving intervention beef and export-credit insurance. It also rejected other allegations, including claims that Customs or Revenue officials had deliberately protected the Goodman organisation because of political influence, and found no evidence that certain ministerial decisions had been motivated by improper personal or political considerations.

The inquiry had significant political and constitutional consequences. Disputes over evidence given by Taoiseach Albert Reynolds and Progressive Democrats leader Desmond O'Malley contributed to the collapse of their coalition government in 1992, while a Supreme Court case arising from the inquiry established an extensive doctrine of Cabinet confidentiality which was partly reversed by the Seventeenth Amendment in 1997.

== Background ==
=== Growth of the beef-processing industry ===
Ireland's beef-processing industry expanded considerably following the country's entry into the European Economic Community in 1973. The sector became heavily influenced by the Common Agricultural Policy, including intervention purchasing, export refunds and other mechanisms intended to support agricultural prices.

By the end of the 1980s, Goodman International had become the largest company in the Irish beef-processing industry; by 1991 it was estimated to control about 40 per cent of the Irish market. The group expanded with the assistance of State-backed measures including export credit insurance for beef exports to Iraq and tax-assisted financing associated with its proposed beef-development programme.

Concerns about the industry had already been raised in the Dáil before the establishment of the tribunal. These included allegations about irregularities in European Community support schemes, the allocation of export-credit insurance, taxation, intervention beef and the relationship between processors and government departments.

=== Goodman financial crisis ===
In August 1990 the Goodman group encountered a severe financial crisis and companies within the group entered examinership. The Dáil was recalled to pass the Companies (Amendment) Act 1990, which facilitated the appointment of an examiner to companies in financial difficulty.

The collapse intensified scrutiny of the group's financing and its dealings with the State. Opposition politicians raised questions about tax practices, favourable financing arrangements, export-credit insurance and the circumstances surrounding government support for Goodman's expansion. In October 1990, Workers' Party TDs proposed the establishment of a sworn judicial inquiry. Their proposed terms included the causes of the Goodman group's financial difficulties, its use of tax-assisted borrowing, export-credit insurance, compliance with tax laws, alleged fraud within the meat industry and possible political influence.

== World in Action investigation ==
On 13 May 1991 ITV broadcast an edition of World in Action investigating the Irish beef-processing industry. The programme, reported by journalist Susan O'Keeffe, included allegations concerning Goodman companies and the operation of State and European support schemes.

A former Goodman employee, Patrick McGuinness, appeared on the programme and made allegations concerning company practices. These included falsification of documents, misuse of official stamps, tax abuses and irregularities in European export-support arrangements.

The World in Action broadcast brought the issue to a head within the Fianna Fáil–Progressive Democrats coalition. Progressive Democrats leader Desmond O'Malley pressed Taoiseach Charles Haughey to establish a public inquiry, and Haughey ultimately agreed. O'Malley later told the Dáil that the broadcast had "crystallised" the issue and enabled the Progressive Democrats to insist on an inquiry.

== Establishment ==
On 24 May 1991 Dáil Éireann unanimously approved a resolution declaring it expedient to establish a tribunal to investigate allegations of illegal activity, fraud and malpractice made in the Dáil and in the World in Action programme.

Seanad Éireann adopted a corresponding resolution on 29 May. On 31 May the Minister for Agriculture and Food formally appointed Liam Hamilton, then President of the High Court, as the sole member of the tribunal.

Its terms of reference required it to investigate:

- allegations of illegal activities, fraud and malpractice connected with the beef-processing industry which had been made or referred to in Dáil Éireann;
- allegations made in the ITV programme broadcast on 13 May 1991;
- any connected matters which the tribunal considered necessary to investigate; and
- recommendations arising from its findings.

A preliminary hearing took place on 21 June 1991. The tribunal began taking evidence on 7 November 1991.

== Areas investigated ==
=== Taxation and payments to employees ===
One of the most significant areas examined was the payment of undeclared wages within Goodman companies.

The tribunal found that employees had received "under-the-counter" payments which were concealed through false accounting records. It concluded that there had been a deliberate policy of evading income tax and PRSI on employee payments and that the system of concealment existed throughout the relevant plants.

The tribunal found that the system was known to senior management, had been authorised at that level and had been organised professionally.

The inquiry distinguished these practices from an earlier Revenue settlement concerning tax-avoidance arrangements. It rejected allegations that the Revenue Commissioners had improperly written off liabilities or deliberately protected Goodman companies. The tribunal considered the earlier settlement reasonable in the circumstances and found no evidence that Revenue had turned a blind eye to the later-discovered payroll tax evasion.

=== Intervention beef ===
The tribunal investigated the operation and abuse of the European Community's beef intervention system, including the misappropriation of intervention beef and weaknesses in the Department of Agriculture's controls. In its report, the tribunal described the practices uncovered at the AIBP plant in Rathkeale as a "flagrant abuse of the Intervention System", which it identified as one of the market-support schemes of the Common Agricultural Policy.

The tribunal found serious weaknesses in the controls governing intervention beef at processing plants. At the AIBP plant in Rathkeale it found a deliberate management policy to misappropriate intervention beef for commercial use, while at the associated Shannon Meats cannery intervention beef intended for Soviet food aid was replaced in part with animal hearts and other inferior meat.

At the Anglo-Irish Beef Processors plant at Rathkeale, County Limerick, a fraud involving approximately £900,000 worth of intervention beef was subsequently prosecuted. Two former plant executives pleaded guilty to conspiracy to defraud the Minister for Agriculture and ultimately received suspended six-year prison sentences and community-service orders.

In another case involving a Goodman-controlled Rathkeale plant, inferior meat and animal hearts had been substituted for intervention beef intended for export to the Soviet Union. Three executives later received suspended sentences in connection with a fraud estimated at approximately £710,000.

The tribunal also criticised weaknesses in Department of Agriculture control systems. It recommended tighter supervision of weighing, deboning, documentation and intervention meat within processing plants.

=== Export-credit insurance and Iraq ===
A major part of the inquiry concerned the State's export credit insurance scheme for exports to Iraq. Under the scheme, exporters paid a premium and the State underwrote the risk of non-payment, compensating an exporter if payment for insured goods or services was not received.

As Minister for Industry and Commerce, Albert Reynolds reintroduced export credit insurance for Iraq in April 1987 and subsequently sought increases in the ceiling for insured exports to Iraq from £70 million to £150 million in September 1987 and from £150 million to £270 million in October 1988.

The tribunal found that extremely large proportions of the State's available export-credit insurance had been allocated to this trade. During 1987 and 1988, approximately half of all export-credit insurance available for exports worldwide was allocated to Iraq, and three-quarters of that allocation related to beef. Most of the beef allocation went to Goodman-controlled AIBP.

The tribunal also found that significant quantities of beef insured under the scheme were not produced in Ireland. In the case of AIBP, approximately 18,938 tonnes, or 38 per cent of the relevant tonnage, was non-Irish beef. Such inclusion was contrary to declarations made for the insurance policies.

Hamilton concluded that the resulting potential exposure of the State exceeded £100 million and that the expected benefits to the Irish economy were substantially less than had been assumed because much of the product consisted of intervention or non-Irish beef.

The tribunal nevertheless rejected allegations that Reynolds or Taoiseach Charles Haughey had taken these decisions because of an improper personal or political relationship with Goodman. It found no evidence that either man was personally close to Goodman or that the decisions were motivated by improper considerations.

=== IDA and State assistance ===
The tribunal also examined a proposed five-year expansion plan for the Goodman group's Irish beef operations, which envisaged major investment in modernising processing facilities and received support from the IDA and Government.

The tribunal found that, on 8 March 1988, the Government had acted "wrongfully and in excess of their powers" under section 35 of the Industrial Development Act 1986 by directing the IDA to remove a performance clause from a grant agreement being negotiated with the Goodman Group. The tribunal held that the IDA was intended by the Oireachtas to operate as an "independent and autonomous body in the exercise of its functions".

The Goodman five-year development plan was not implemented. The tribunal subsequently found that, because the Goodman Group had failed to proceed with the plan, no grants were paid for any development under it.

=== Customs and regulatory authorities ===
The tribunal rejected many of these claims. It found no basis for the allegation that Goodman companies had systematically received less Customs scrutiny than other operators and concluded that investigations by Customs had not been obstructed by politicians or senior officials.

However, the tribunal identified significant shortcomings in the control systems operated by the Department of Agriculture. The department later introduced specialised intervention-control units, increased inspection, revised weighing and deboning procedures and assigned additional staff to intervention operations.

== Cabinet confidentiality case ==
During the inquiry, Hamilton sought to question former minister Ray Burke about discussions at a Cabinet meeting on 8 June 1988 concerning the increase of export-credit insurance for beef exports to Iraq and the restriction of insurance cover to two companies. Counsel representing Attorney General Harry Whelehan objected, arguing that Cabinet discussions were constitutionally confidential. Hamilton ruled that he was entitled to pursue the questioning, after which the Attorney General sought judicial review of the ruling.

The Supreme Court held by a majority that Cabinet discussions enjoyed effectively absolute confidentiality under the Constitution. The ruling prevented the tribunal from investigating some aspects of how government decisions concerning export-credit insurance had been reached. In his final report, Hamilton stated that the ruling had prevented him from investigating and reporting on the factors that had influenced the Government in reaching some of its decisions.

The constitutional rule was subsequently modified following the Seventeenth Amendment referendum in 1997. The amendment allows the High Court, in exceptional circumstances, to permit disclosure of Cabinet discussions where required for the administration of justice or because of an overriding public interest in proceedings before a tribunal.

== Political consequences ==
=== Collapse of the 1992 government ===
The tribunal became a major source of tension within the Fianna Fáil–Progressive Democrats coalition.

O'Malley criticised decisions made by Reynolds while Minister for Industry and Commerce concerning export-credit insurance, describing his conduct as "grossly unwise, reckless and foolish". When Reynolds later gave evidence to the tribunal, he described aspects of O'Malley's evidence as dishonest and declined requests to withdraw the accusation.

The Progressive Democrats subsequently withdrew from government, forcing the 1992 Irish general election.

Fianna Fáil lost seats in the 1992 Irish general election, after which Reynolds formed a coalition government with the Labour Party.

=== Publication of the report ===
Hamilton delivered his report on 29 July 1994. The Government publicly emphasised the sections rejecting allegations of political corruption and improper personal relationships between Goodman and senior Fianna Fáil politicians.

Labour ministers and opposition politicians placed greater emphasis on the findings concerning export-credit insurance, tax evasion, regulatory shortcomings and public administration.

Publication of the tribunal report in 1994 caused serious tensions between the Fianna Fáil and Labour coalition partners. Taoiseach Albert Reynolds presented the report as vindicating his conduct, while Tánaiste Dick Spring strongly criticised the handling of the beef industry by earlier Fianna Fáil governments. The coalition survived the immediate dispute, but collapsed in November 1994 during a separate controversy over Reynolds's decision to appoint Attorney General Harry Whelehan as President of the High Court and revelations concerning delays in the Attorney General's office in processing the extradition request for paedophile priest Brendan Smyth.

== Report and findings ==
The final report was published by the Stationery Office in 1994. It comprised more than 900 pages.

Among its principal findings were:

- deliberate and organised evasion of income tax and PRSI through concealed payments to employees within Goodman companies;
- misuse and misappropriation of intervention beef at some processing plants;
- substantial abuse of the export-credit insurance scheme through the inclusion of intervention and non-Irish beef;
- excessive concentration of available export-credit cover on beef exports to Iraq;
- serious weaknesses in State supervision of intervention beef and processing operations;
- shortcomings in aspects of government decision-making and the assessment of risks to the taxpayer;
- no evidence supporting a number of allegations that Revenue and Customs authorities deliberately protected Goodman companies;
- no evidence establishing that senior ministers acted from improper personal or political motives in their dealings with Goodman; and
- a need for stronger controls and greater accountability within both industry and public administration.

== Recommendations ==
Hamilton made recommendations concerning regulation of the beef industry and taxation.

The tribunal endorsed tighter Department of Agriculture controls over the weighing, deboning and documentation of intervention beef and recommended that State officials exercise direct control over critical stages of the intervention process.

It also recommended changing the law so that auditors who discovered tax evasion within a company would have an obligation to report it to the Revenue Commissioners rather than merely reporting the matter internally to management or shareholders.

== Subsequent prosecutions ==
The tribunal was a fact-finding body rather than a court and had no power to determine civil or criminal liability or to impose criminal penalties.

Criminal proceedings nevertheless arose from some of the practices uncovered in the beef industry. Two executives of the Goodman-owned AIBP plant at Rathkeale pleaded guilty to conspiracy to defraud the Minister for Agriculture through the misappropriation of approximately £905,000 worth of intervention beef. They ultimately received six-year suspended sentences and were disqualified from serving as company directors for six years.

Other executives were convicted in relation to fraud involving intervention beef at another Rathkeale operation.

Journalist Susan O'Keeffe was subsequently prosecuted after refusing to identify confidential sources connected with her World in Action investigation. The prosecution failed for lack of evidence.

== European Community penalties and regulatory reform ==
The period of the tribunal also coincided with investigations by the European Commission into Ireland's administration of European agricultural support schemes.

Commission officials identified deficiencies in controls over beef intervention, carried out inspections in Ireland and other member states between 1991 and 1993, and subsequently imposed substantial financial corrections on Ireland. Ireland ultimately incurred approximately £72 million in European Community financial corrections relating principally to deficiencies in intervention controls and beef-tendering procedures during the early 1990s.

The Department of Agriculture subsequently restructured its controls. Measures included additional staff in deboning halls, revised documentation, tighter weighing procedures, specialised intervention units, inspection teams and more systematic training.

== Duration and cost ==
The tribunal's preliminary sitting took place in June 1991, evidence was heard from November 1991, and the final sitting occurred on 15 July 1993. Official parliamentary records state that Hamilton sat for 231 days and heard evidence from 475 witnesses.

Contemporary RTÉ reporting described it as the longest-running public inquiry in the history of the State at that time.

The legal costs continued to accumulate for years after the hearings had concluded. By February 1999 almost £17 million had been paid in legal costs, with additional claims still disputed.

In 2016 the Department of Agriculture stated in a parliamentary answer that the eventual cost of the Beef Tribunal was €27.2 million.

The payment of legal expenses to parties appearing before the tribunal itself became controversial. In 1996 the Taxing Master awarded Goodman and his legal advisers millions of pounds in costs, prompting challenges by the State.

== Legacy ==
The Beef Tribunal became one of the earliest of a series of large-scale Irish public tribunals during the 1990s and 2000s.

The tribunal identified significant weaknesses in the administration and supervision of European Community agricultural-support schemes, including controls governing intervention beef. It also documented shortcomings in information-sharing and decision-making between government departments in relation to the beef industry and export-credit insurance.

It also had lasting constitutional significance. The Supreme Court's Cabinet-confidentiality ruling arising from the inquiry prompted continuing debate over whether an absolute rule of secrecy prevented effective investigation of government conduct. In 1997 voters approved the Seventeenth Amendment, which created limited exceptions to Cabinet confidentiality for court proceedings and tribunals acting in an overriding public interest.

The cost and duration of the Beef Tribunal prompted wider criticism of the tribunal-of-inquiry model. During the 1994 Dáil debate on its report, members referred to criticism of both the expense and length of the inquiry and questioned whether judicial tribunals were the most appropriate means of conducting such investigations. The Law Reform Commission later stated that the tribunal's IR£18.5 million (€23 million) in legal and professional fees had affected public, political and media attitudes towards tribunals of inquiry.

== See also ==
- Larry Goodman
- Albert Reynolds
- Desmond O'Malley
- Charles Haughey
- Liam Hamilton
- Tribunals of Inquiry (Evidence) Act 1921
- List of public inquiries in the Republic of Ireland
- Seventeenth Amendment of the Constitution of Ireland
- Moriarty Tribunal
- Mahon Tribunal
