= Liam Hamilton =

Irish judge and barrister (1928–2000)

Chief Justice of Ireland
- In office 22 March 1994 – 1 June 2000
- Nominated by: Government of Ireland
- Appointed by: Mary Robinson
- Preceded by: Thomas Finlay
- Succeeded by: Ronan Keane

Judge of the Supreme Court
- In office 1 March 1994 – 1 June 2000
- Nominated by: Government of Ireland
- Appointed by: Mary Robinson

President of the High Court
- In office 22 July 1985 – 1 March 1994
- Nominated by: Government of Ireland
- Appointed by: Patrick Hillery
- Preceded by: Thomas Finlay
- Succeeded by: Harry Whelehan

Judge of the High Court
- In office 12 May 1974 – 1 March 1994
- Nominated by: Government of Ireland
- Appointed by: Patrick Hillery

Personal details
- Born: 8 September 1928 Mitchelstown, County Cork, Ireland
- Died: 29 November 2000 (aged 72) Donnybrook, Dublin, Ireland
- Resting place: Shanganagh Cemetery, Shankill, Dublin, Ireland
- Party: Labour Party
- Spouse: Maeve Hamilton (m. 1948)
- Children: 3
- Education: University College Dublin; King's Inns

Liam Hamilton (8 September 1928 – 29 November 2000) was an Irish judge and barrister who served as Chief Justice of Ireland and a Judge of the Supreme Court from 1994 to 2000, President of the High Court from 1985 to 1994 and a Judge of the High Court from 1974 to 1994.

== Early life ==
He was born in Mitchelstown, County Cork, to Richard Hamilton and Mary Ellen Hamilton (née Lyons). He was educated at C.B.S. Mitchelstown, University College Dublin and King's Inns. He initially worked as a civil servant and was called to the Bar in 1956 and to the Inner Bar in 1968.

== Legal career ==
As a barrister, he acted for Neil Blaney when Blaney and Charles Haughey were charged with conspiracy to import arms in 1970. He was a member of the Labour Party and acted as its legal advisor.

== Judicial career ==
After the Labour Party formed a coalition government with Fine Gael in 1973, he was appointed a High Court judge. He was one of the key members of the judiciary who made findings against Nicky Kelly and others and in support of the State in what became one of the State's most infamous miscarriages of justice.

He was regarded as sociable and visited former legal colleagues after becoming a judge. In 1985, on the nomination of the Labour Party, he was appointed President of the High Court, where he was successful in reforming procedures and clearing a backlog of cases.

He was the sole member of a tribunal of inquiry established by the government in 1991 to investigate allegations of illegal activity, fraud and malpractice in the beef processing industry, known as the Beef Tribunal, which sat from 1991 to 1994. Shortly after the report of the tribunal, he was nominated as Chief Justice. In 1999, he was asked by Minister for Justice John O'Donoghue to investigate the Philip Sheedy Affair.

On retirement as Chief Justice in 2000, he was appointed to the enquiry into the 1974 Dublin, Monaghan and Dundalk bombings, but stepped down on health grounds. He died on 29 November 2000.

Legal offices
Preceded by Thomas Finlay	Chief Justice of Ireland; 1994–2000	Succeeded by Ronan Keane
