= Skellig (disambiguation) =

Skellig is a 1998 children's novel by David Almond.

Skellig may also refer to:

== Arts and entertainment ==
- Skellig (film), a 2009 film based on the novel
- Skellig, a 2008 opera by Tod Machover based on the novel
- Skellig (album), by David Gray, 2021, and its title track
- "Skellig", a song by Loreena McKennitt from the 1997 album The Book of Secrets

== Other uses ==
- Skellig Islands, Kerry, Ireland
  - Skellig Michael, or Great Skellig, the larger of the Skellig Islands
  - Little Skellig, the smaller of the Skellig Islands
- Skellig Rangers GAA, a Gaelic football team

== See also ==
- "Sceilg", pen name of John J. O'Kelly (1872–1957)
