= Killemlagh Church =

Ruined church in County Kerry, Ireland

- Location within Ireland

Religion
- Affiliation: Catholic Church
- Status: Ruined

Location
- Location: County Kerry
- Country: Ireland
- Interactive map of Killemlagh Church
- Coordinates: 51.848°N 10.332°W

Architecture
- Style: Romanesque
- Completed: 12th century
- Materials: Stone

Killemlagh Church (Irish: Cill Imleach) is a ruined 12th-century church in County Kerry in the southwest of Ireland.

== Name and location ==
Killemlagh, or Cill Imleach, means "church (cill) on marginal land (imleach)", or "church on border land". John O'Hanlon (1821–1905) states that the name is due to the church lying beside the sea. The church gives its name to the parish of Killemlagh in the Barony of Iveragh, County Kerry. The graveyard is locally known as Glen graveyard, after the Glen parish church which adjoins the older Killemlagh Church. It may be so-named because it is situated within a glen between Knocknaskereighta Mountain to the northeast and Canuig Mountain to the southwest.

The church is on the Skellig Ring drive between Portmagee and Ballinskelligs, looking over St. Finian's Bay. From the church one can see the Skellig Islands. The megalithic stone structure called the "Pagan's Grave" is nearby. The site is said to be that of the monastery of Finnian of Clonard. To the west of the old church, St. Finin's Well is situated by the sea shore.

== Structure ==
Killemlagh Church was built in the late 12th century. The style is Romanesque. Until the mid-17th century, the church was in good condition, but it has since lost its roof. A new chapel was attached to the original church, which by then was ruined, in the 19th century. The new parish church is now also roofless. According to O'Hanlon, writing in 1875,

The parish chapel was built to the north side of this ruined church; the north wall of the latter serving for the south wall of the former building. The old building, on the interior, is forty-eight feet, six inches, in length; the breadth seventeen feet, nine inches; while the height of its side walls, on the inside, is ten feet, three inches. The thickness of its walls is about three feet, five and a-half inches.

On the east gable, there is a window, constructed of green cut stone. It has a circular top, on the inside. This window is eight feet, three inches, high, on the inside, and four feet, two inches, broad. A heap of human bones, coffin boards and earth, dug up to cover graves, raised the ground surface, on the interior, to level with this window, in 1841. On the outside, this window appears to have been pointed at top, where it was somewhat injured, at that period. The window, on this side, was then about two feet, four inches, from the ground—it is to be presumed at the lower part—it being five feet, two inches, in height. and seven inches, in width.

At a distance of two feet, six inches, from the east gable, there stood a window, in the south side wall. This was square on the inside—a rude flagstone being placed across it, at top and bottom. A heap of bones and broken coffins nearly reached to the window, on the inside, in 1841. Interiorly, the window measured five feet, eleven inches, in height, and three feet, eight inches, in breadth, below, and above, three feet, nine inches. Exteriorly, it is rounded, at the top, being two feet, eleven inches, in height; six inches in width; and, one foot, nine and a-half inches, from the ground.

On the south side wall, about thirteen feet, eight inches from the west gable, there is a circular doorway, the interior sides of which are built with green cut-stone, as is, also, a part of its arch, the top of which has been constructed with rude and thin stones. The inside height of this door is about seven feet, eight inches; the breadth is about five feet, four inches.

The antiquary P.J. Lynch described the church in 1909. Although the style was generally typical of a church of the 12th century, the shallower pitch of the roof led him to think it might be of later construction. The stone of the walls are not large, and the green stone of the district was used for the door and window dressings. The heads of the windows are semi-circular. The east window is 7 1/2 inches (190 mm) wide at its sill, narrowing to 5 1/2 inches (140 mm) at its head. The original doorway was in the west end, but this had been filled in. In 1909, the doorway was in the south side, and the dressings had either been removed or the opening was relatively recent and never had dressings. The walls were about 11 feet (3.4 m) high above the ground level and 3 feet 6 inches (1.07 m) thick.

== Sources ==
- Buckley, Karen; Dunne, Laurence (September 2007), Archaeological Survey, Glen (Old) Church &Graveyard, Rathkieran, Co. Kerry. (PDF), Eachtra Archaeological Projects
- "Cill Imleach / Killemlagh", logainm.ie, Government of Ireland
- Dempsey, Jim (2018), Rathkieran: Killemlagh Church and Ogham Stone
- Jones, Laurence, "Killemlagh", GENUKI
- "Killemlagh Church, Southwest Ireland, County Kerry", Direction Ireland
- Lynch, P. J. (31 March 1902), "Some of the Antiquities around St. Finan's Bay, County Kerry", The Journal of the Royal Society of Antiquaries of Ireland, Fifth Series, 32 (1), Royal Society of Antiquaries of Ireland pp. 42–63 (22 pages)
- O'Hanlon, John (1875), Lives of the Irish Saints : with special festivals, and the commemorations of holy persons, Dublin: J. Duffy
