= Puffin Island (County Kerry) =

Island in Ireland

Native name: Oileán na gCánóg
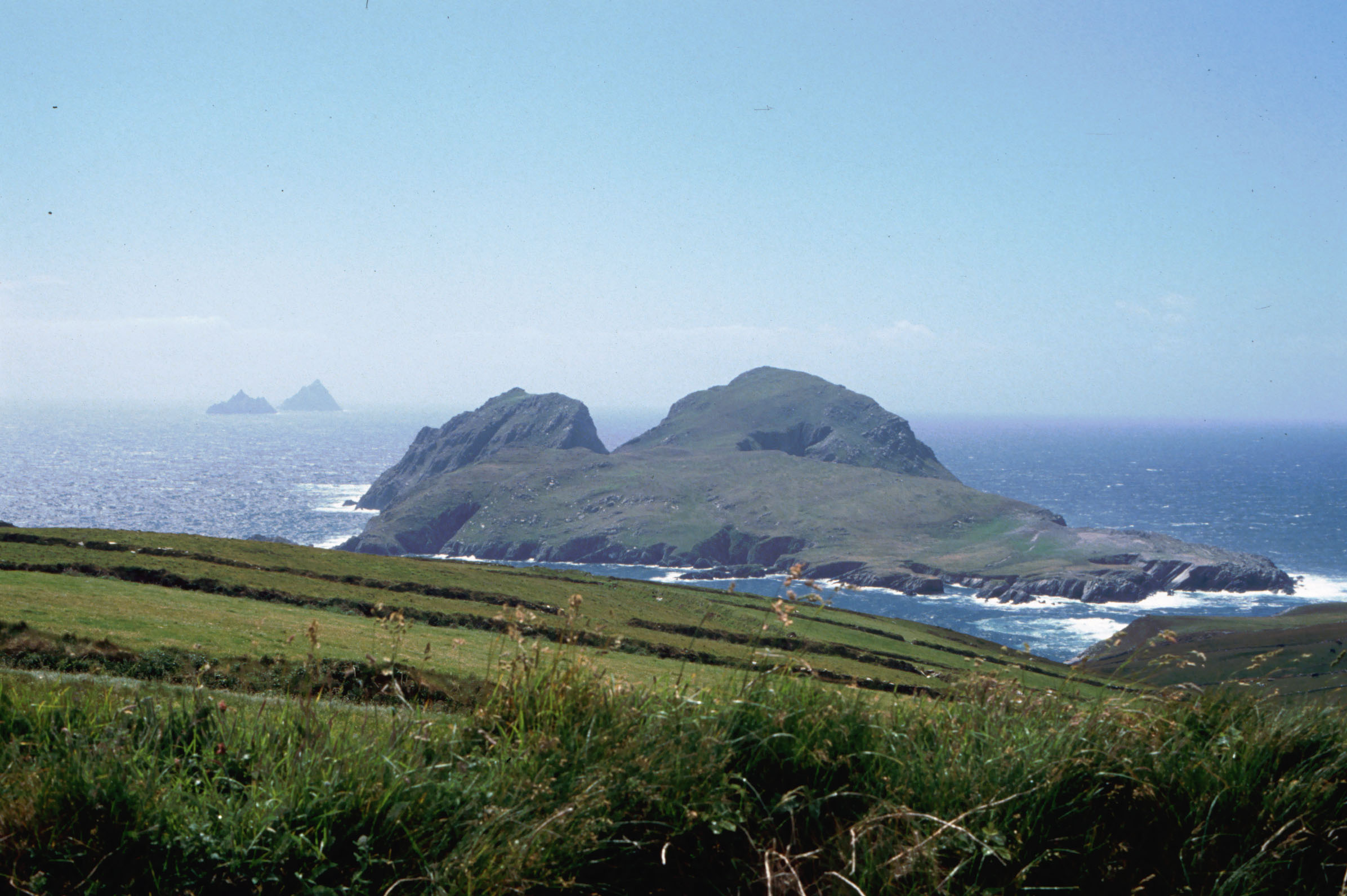
- Puffin Island, with the Skelligs in the background

- Location within island of Ireland

Geography
- Location: Atlantic Ocean
- Coordinates: 51°50′N 10°25′W
- Area: 138 acres (56 ha)
- Length: 1.5 km (0.93 mi)
- Width: 0.7 km (0.43 mi)
- Highest elevation: 213 m (699 ft)

Administration
- Ireland
- Province: Munster
- County: Kerry

Demographics
- Population: 0

Puffin Island (Irish: Oileán na gCánóg), historically called Inishfearglin, is an uninhabited steep rocky island lying off the coast of the Iveragh Peninsula, County Kerry, Ireland.

== Geography ==
The island is about 1.5 km long and 0.7 km wide, and rises to 213 metres. It is separated from the mainland by Puffin Sound, which is only about 250 metres across. Day visits to the island from Valentia or The Glen Pier can be arranged. It lies off the northern headland of St. Finian's Bay.

== Nature conservation ==
Puffin Island holds important populations of several seabird species, including Atlantic puffins, Manx shearwaters and European storm-petrels, and was acquired as a nature reserve by the Irish Wildbird Conservancy (now BirdWatch Ireland) in the early 1980s.

== History ==
The island also has some signs of ancient human habitation, and it has attracted the interest of archaeologists.

== Photo gallery ==
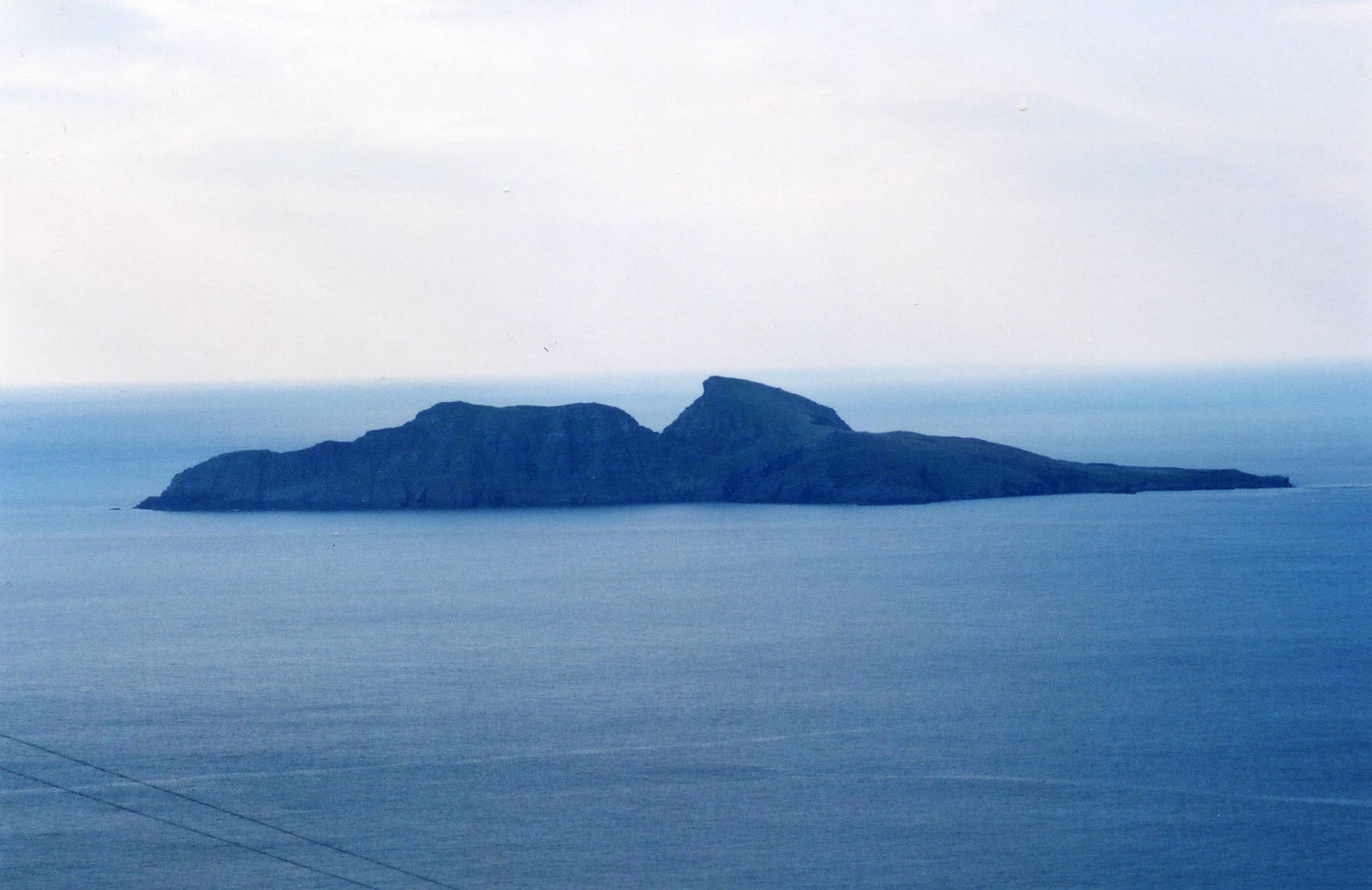
Puffin Island from mainland

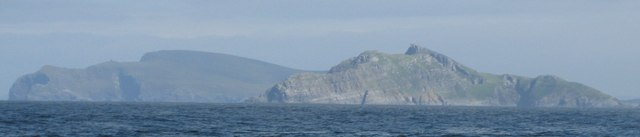
Puffin Island and, in the distance to its left, Valentia Island
