= St. Finian's Bay =

Bay in County Kerry, Ireland

- Bá Fhíonáin (Irish)
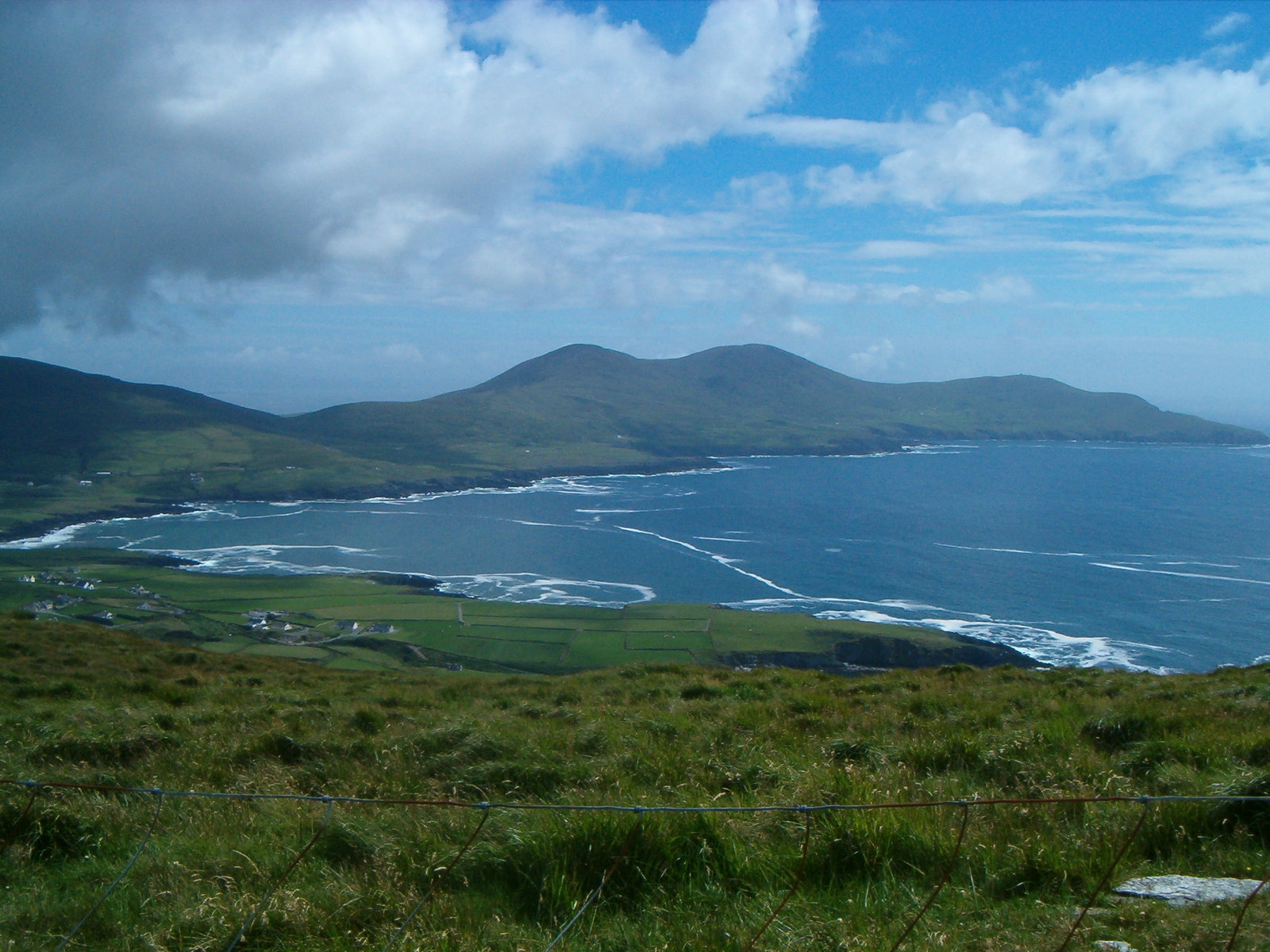
- St Finian's Bay from the Coonanaspig Pass

- Location in Ireland
- Location: County Kerry, Ireland
- Coordinates: 51.8249°N 10.3577°W
- Basin countries: Ireland
- Islands: Puffin Island, Skellig Michael, Little Skellig, Lemon Rock

St. Finian's Bay (or St. Finan’s Bay, Irish: Bá Fhíonáin) is an exposed bay on the Atlantic coast of County Kerry, Ireland.

== Location ==
St. Finian's Bay is on the Atlantic coast of County Kerry, Ireland. The bay lies between Puffin Island to the north and Ducalla Head to the south. It is crescent shaped, with headlands at each end. Inland of the bay there are gently sloping grassy hills. Puffin Island is very close to the coast, while the Skellig Islands (Skellig Michael and Little Skellig) can be seen further out to sea.

The bay is between the village of Portmagee and the Ballinskelligs area on the Skellig Ring drive.

The pier in St. Finian’s Bay is used by divers as a launching point for exploration of the Skellig Rocks. Surfers use Glen's Beach in the bay.

== Name ==
The bay is named after Saint Finan Cam. He may have been the first founder of the oratory on Skellig Michael, directly opposite St. Finian's Bay.

When the Danes were raiding Ireland the monastery was moved to the mainland, and as of 1890 its dilapidated walls could still be seen in the sheltered corner at the head of St. Finian's Bay.

== Archaeology ==
Traces of Bronze Age occupation have been found near the bay. At Rathkerin there are the remains of an earth fort, and there are many stone graves and souterrains.

The Kilaboona Oratory is an early Christian site. There is a well dedicated to Saint Buaine to the west of the settlement. The Killemlagh Church, an Irish Romanesque building that is now ruined, was built on the site of Saint Finan's monastery in the 12th or 13th century. A parish church was attached to it later.

The Pagan's Grave is an 18 by 11 ft (5.5 by 3.4 m) enclosure of standing stones to the south of the church.

== Sources ==
- Healy, John (1890), Insula Sanctorum Et Doctorum, BoD – Books on Demand, ISBN 978-3-7523-3423-4 This article incorporates text from this source, which is in the public domain.
- "Welcome to St Finian's Bay", gokerry
- "St. Finian's Bay", Ireland Highlights
