= Skellig Michael =

UNESCO heritage island off the coast of Kerry, Ireland

Coordinates: 51°46′16″N 10°32′26″W

Native name: Sceilg Mhichíl
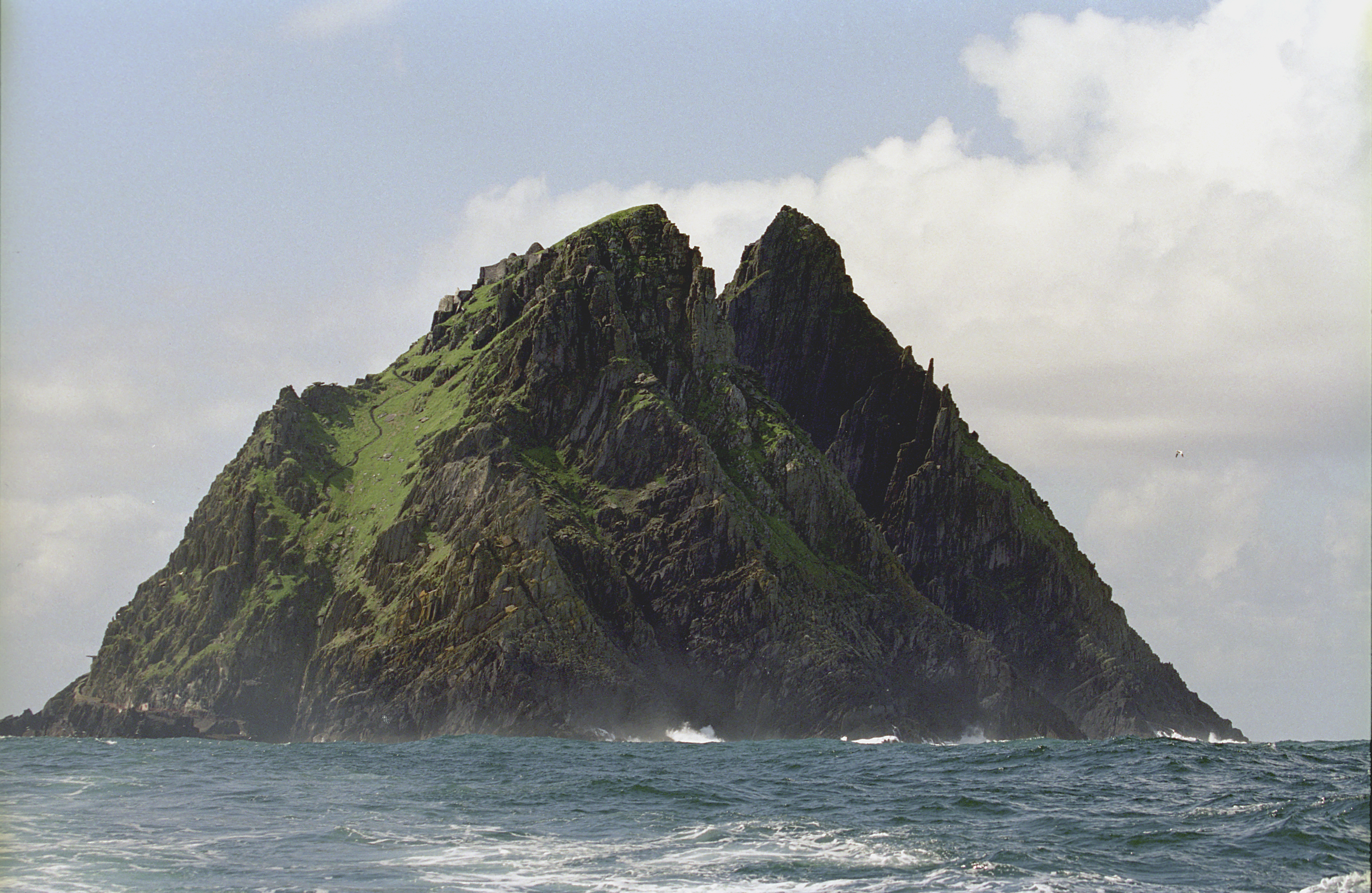
- Skellig Michael

- Location within island of Ireland

Geography
- Location: Atlantic Ocean
- Area: 21.9 ha (54 acres)
- Highest elevation: 218 m (715 ft)

Administration
- Ireland
- County: Kerry

Demographics
- Population: 0

UNESCO World Heritage Site
- Official name: Sceilg Mhichíl
- Criteria: Cultural: iii, iv
- Reference: 757
- Inscription: 1996 (20th Session)

Skellig Michael (Irish: Sceilg Mhichíl [ˌʃcɛlʲəɟ ˈvʲɪçiːlʲ]), also called Great Skellig (Irish: Sceilg Mhór [ˈʃcɛlʲəɟ woːɾˠ]), is a twin-pinnacled crag 11.6 kilometres (7.2 mi) west of the Iveragh Peninsula in County Kerry, Ireland. Its twin island, Little Skellig (Sceilg Bheag), is smaller and inaccessible. The two islands were formed c. 374–360 million years ago during a period of mountain formation, along with the local MacGillycuddy's Reeks mountain range. Rising water levels later separated them from the mainland.

Skellig Michael consists of approximately 22 hectares (54 acres) of rock, with its highest point, known as the Spit, 218 m (714 ft) above sea level. Defined by twin peaks and a central valley called Christ’s Saddle, the island has a steep and inhospitable landscape. It is best known for its Gaelic monastery, founded between the 6th and 8th centuries, and its variety of inhabiting species, which include gannets, puffins, a colony of razorbills and a population of approximately fifty grey seals.

The island is of special interest to archaeologists, as the monastic settlement is in unusually good condition. The monastery on the northern peak is situated at an elevation of 170 to 180 m (550 to 600 ft), Christ's Saddle at 129 m (422 ft), and the flagstaff area are 37 m (120 ft) above sea level. The monastery can be approached by narrow and steep flights of stone steps which ascend from three landing points. The hermitage on the south peak is only accessible via a dangerous approach and is largely closed to the public. Because of the often difficult crossing from the mainland and the exposed nature of the landing spots, the island is accessible only during the summer months. UNESCO designated Skellig Michael a World Heritage Site in 1996.

== Etymology ==
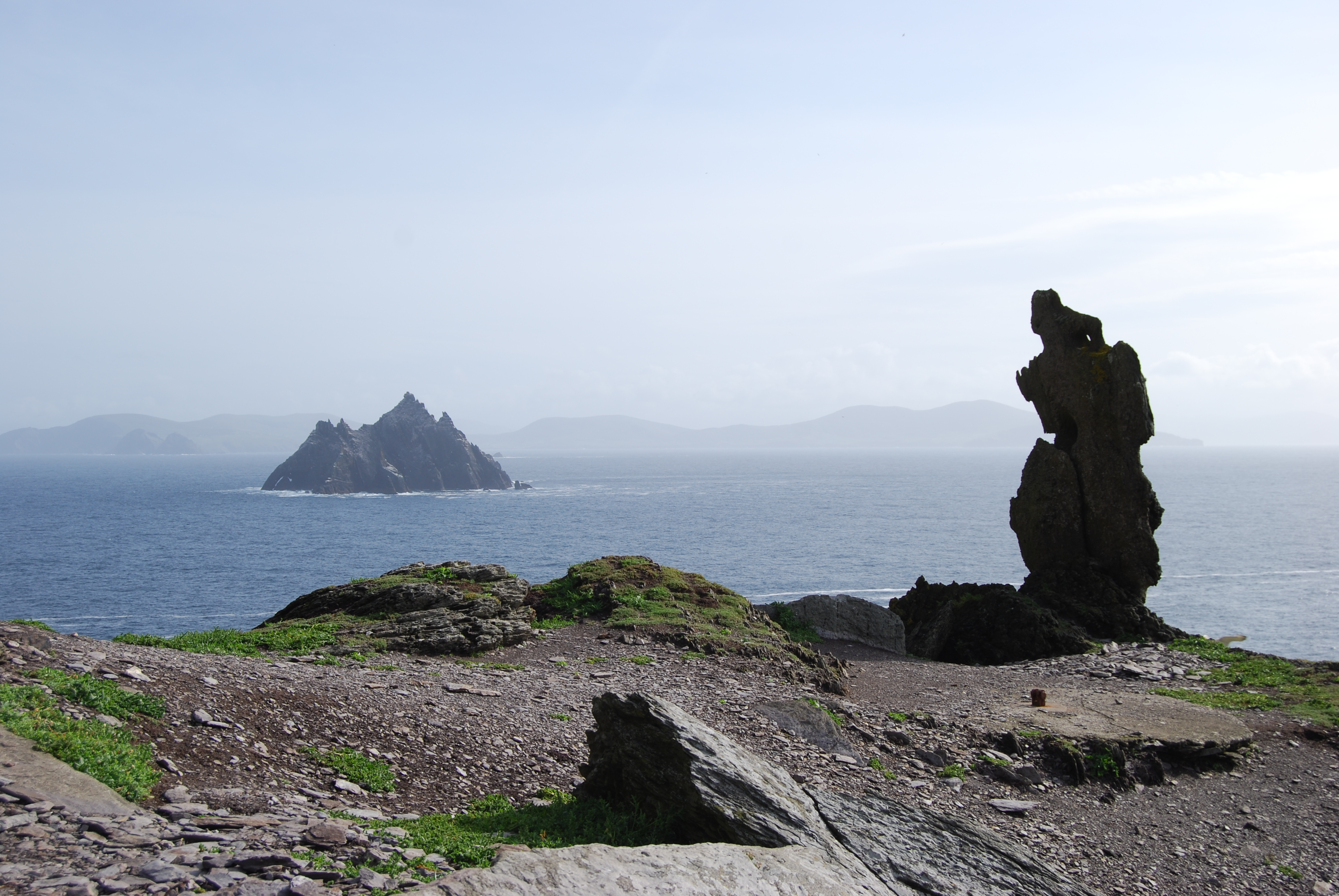
View of the Wailing Woman rock, with Little Skellig in the distance

The name apparently derives from the Irish word sceilg (in Old Irish, sceillec), meaning either "small piece of rock" or "steep rock or crag", with the later addition of Mhichíl, referring to the Archangel Michael, the patron saint of the monastery. The former word is rare in placenames, occurring only in a few other instances, including Bunskellig, County Cork, and Temple-na-Skellig, County Wicklow. Magne Oftedal regarded the Skelligs' name as a Gaelicisation of the Old Norse Skellingar, meaning "resounding ones" (with reference to the sound of waves breaking on them), but the fact that the name predates the Vikings' presence in Ireland argues against this. An alternative name for Skelling Michael was Glascarraig, meaning "green rock".

Irr lost his life upon the western main;
Skellig's high cliffs the hero's bones contain.
In the same wreck Arranan too was lost,
Nor did his corpse e'er touch Ierne's coast.

The first known reference to the Skelligs appears in the Irish annals: a retelling of a shipwreck occurring around 1400 BC, said to have been caused by the Tuatha Dé Danann, a supernatural race in Irish mythology. According to legend, Irr, son of Míl Espáine (who is sometimes credited with the colonisation of Ireland), was travelling from the Iberian Peninsula, but drowned and was buried on the island. Daire Domhain ("King of the World") is said to have stayed there c. 200 AD before attacking Fionn mac Cumhaill's army in nearby Ventry. A text from the 8th or 9th century records that Duagh, King of West Munster, fled to "Scellecc" after a feud with the Kings of Cashel sometime in the 5th century, although the historicity of the event has not been established. Other early mentions include in the narrative prose of the Lebor Gabála Érenn and Cath Finntrágha, as well the medieval Martyrology of Tallaght.

== Geography ==
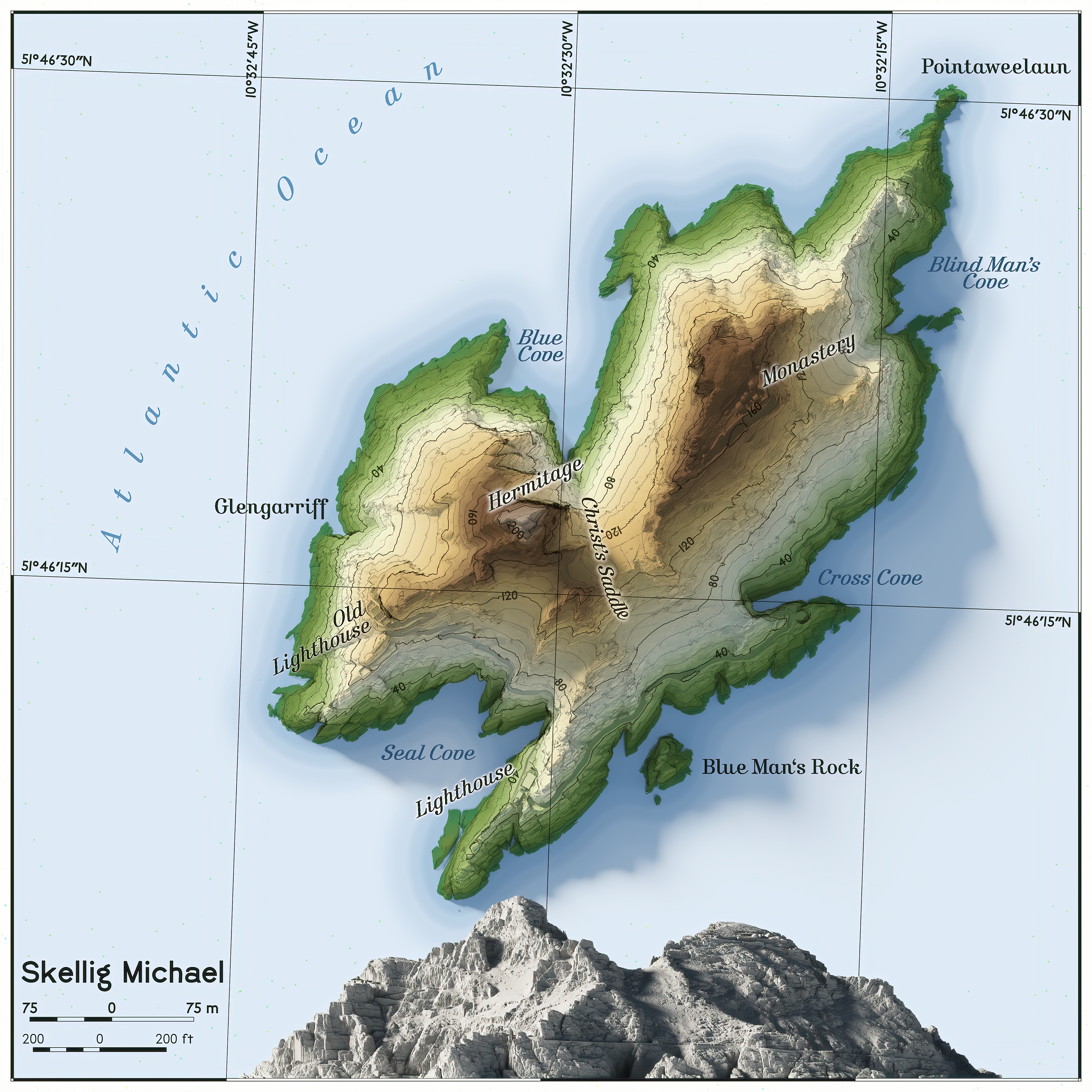
Map of the island

Skellig Michael is a steep, pyramidal and rugged rock (or "crag") of c. 18 ha (45 acres) on the Atlantic coast off the Iveragh Peninsula of County Kerry. It is 11.7 km (7 1/4 mi) west-northwest of Bolus Head, at the southern end of Saint Finian's Bay. Its twin island, Little Skellig, is a mile closer to land and far more inhospitable because of its sheer cliff faces. The small Lemon Rock island is 3.6 km (2 1/4 mi) further inland. The nearby Puffin Island is another seabird colony. The Skelligs, along with some of the Blasket Islands, constitute the most westerly part of both Ireland and Europe, excluding Iceland.

The island is defined by its two peaks: the north-east summit where the monastery is built (185 metres above sea level), and the south-west point containing the hermitage (218 metres above sea level). These elevations lie on either side of a depression colloquially known as Christ's Saddle.

=== Geology ===
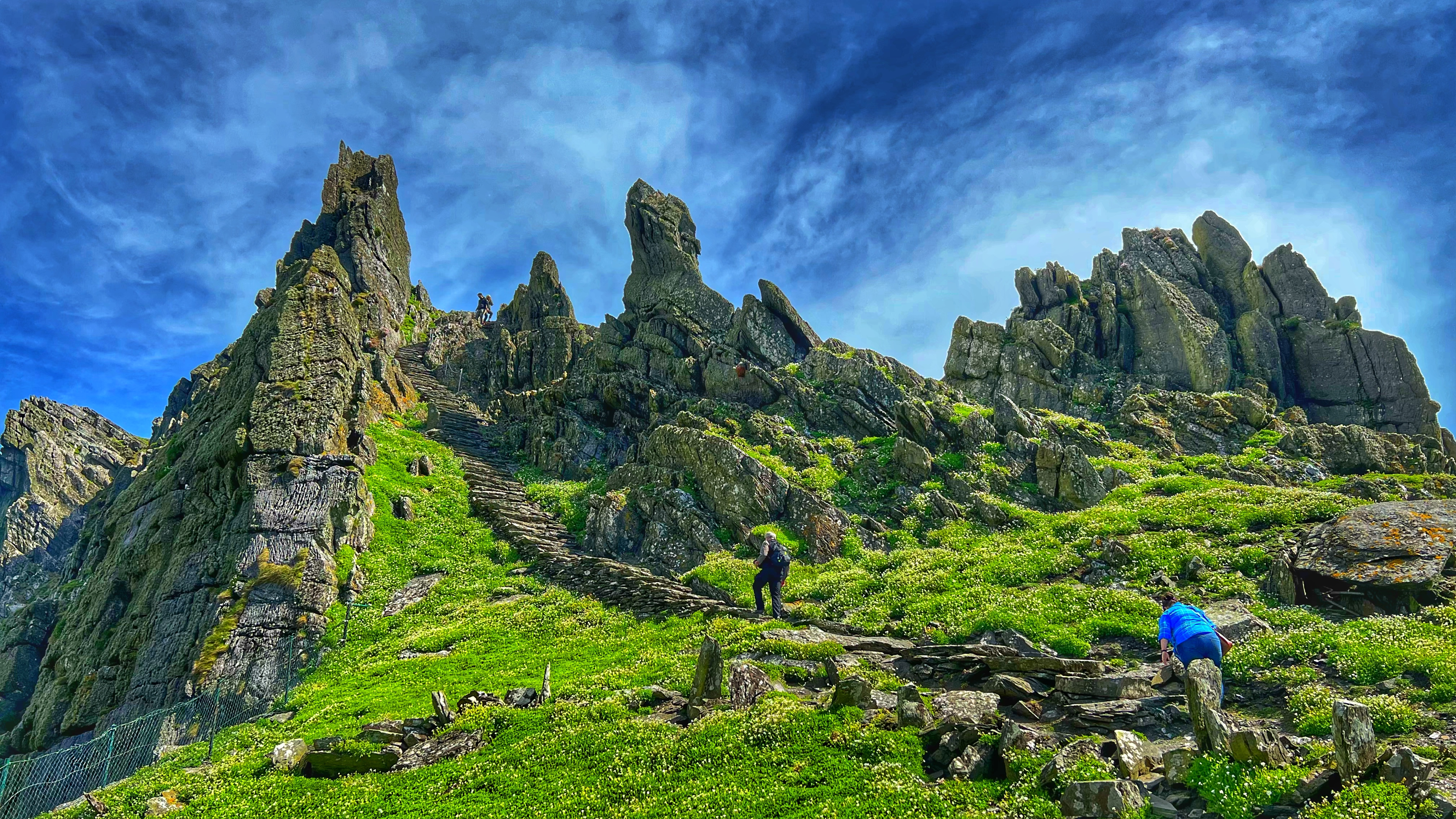
Rock formations on Skellig Michael

The islands are composed of Old Red Sandstone and compressed slate, and were formed between 360 and 374 million years ago, as part of the rising of the MacGillycuddy's Reeks and Caha Mountains mountain ranges. This occurred during the Devonian period when Ireland was part of a larger continental landmass and located south of the equator. The region's topography of peaks and valleys are characterised by steep ridges formed during the Hercynian period of folding and mountain formation some 300 million years ago. When the Atlantic Ocean level rose, it created deep marine inlets such as Bantry Bay and left the Skelligs detached from the mainland. The rock is highly compressed and contains numerous fracture lines and joints. As a result of erosion along a major north–south-trending fault line containing bedrock much more brittle than that in surrounding areas, a large part of the rock broke away, resulting in Christ's Saddle, the depression between the peaks. The island's rock is deeply eroded through exposure to wind and water.

The Wailing Woman rock lies in the centre of the island, on the ascent before the Christ's Saddle ridge, 120 m (400 ft) above sea level, on 1.2 ha (3 acres) of grassland. It is the only flat and fertile part of the island, and thus contains traces of medieval crop farming. The path from the Saddle to the summit is known as the Way of the Christ, a nomenclature that reflects the danger presented to climbers. Notable features on this stretch include the Needle's Eye peak, a stone chimney 150 metres (490 ft) above sea level, and a series of 14 stone crosses with names such as the "Rock of the Women's piercing caoine", further references to the harsh climb. Further up is the Stone of Pain area, including the station known as the Spit, a long and narrow fragment of rock approached by 60-centimetre-wide (2 ft) steps. The ruin of the medieval church is lower and approached before the older monastery.

=== Coves ===
The island's three main coves are Blind Man's Cove to the east, Cross Cove to the south and Blue Cove to the north. Each can be used as an access point from the sea. All three have steps carved into the rock from their landing point to above sea level. The main landing cove is in the recesses of the eastern side; known as Blind Man's Cove, it is exposed to sea swells and high waves, making approach difficult outside the summer months. The bay's pier is positioned under a sheer cliff face, populated by large numbers of birds. Built in 1826 from an area known as the Flagstaff, it leads to a small stairway to the now-disused lighthouse. The steps divide into two staircases, the earliest and largely abandoned path leading directly to the monastery.

Blue Cove is the most difficult landing point and is only approachable on an average of 20 days per year. Noting the inaccessibility of the island, writer Des Lavelle observes that "the fact that the monks of old undertook the giant task of constructing a stairway to this bleak cove is a good argument that the weather conditions then were far better than now."

== Ecology ==
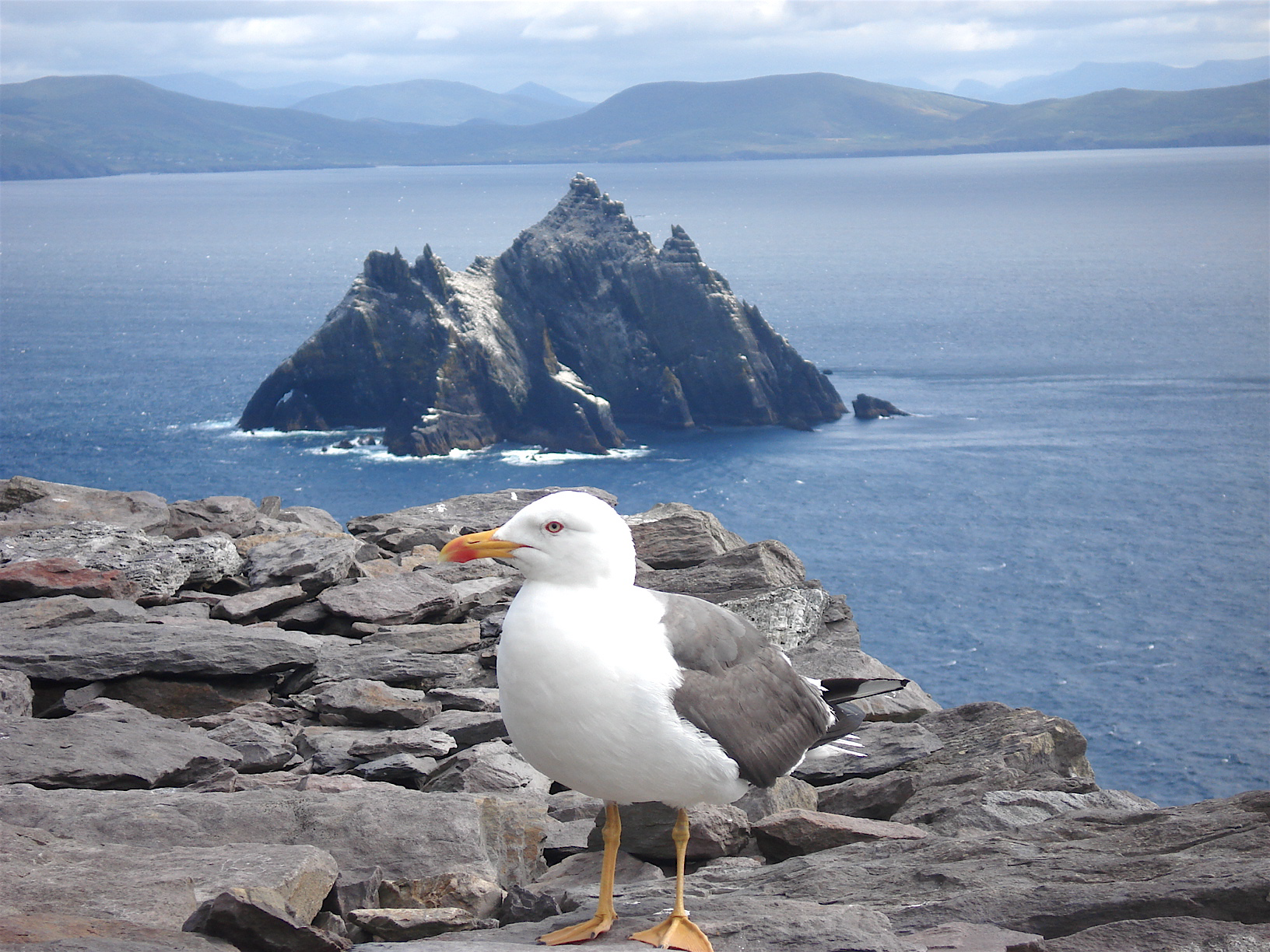
Gull with Little Skellig in background

Skellig Michael is lined by exposed sea cliffs and three bays. Its inland is mostly thin soil on steep ground, with patches of vegetation which are, however, exposed to sea spray. Nonetheless, it has an ecology far more diverse than on the mainland; as an island, it provides sanctuary for a wide variety of flora and fauna, many of which are unusual to Ireland. It contains a large range of seabirds, now protected by the island's status as a nature reserve owned by the state. The Skellig Islands were classified as a Special Protection Area in 1986 when they were recognised for containing an unusually large variety and population of birds.

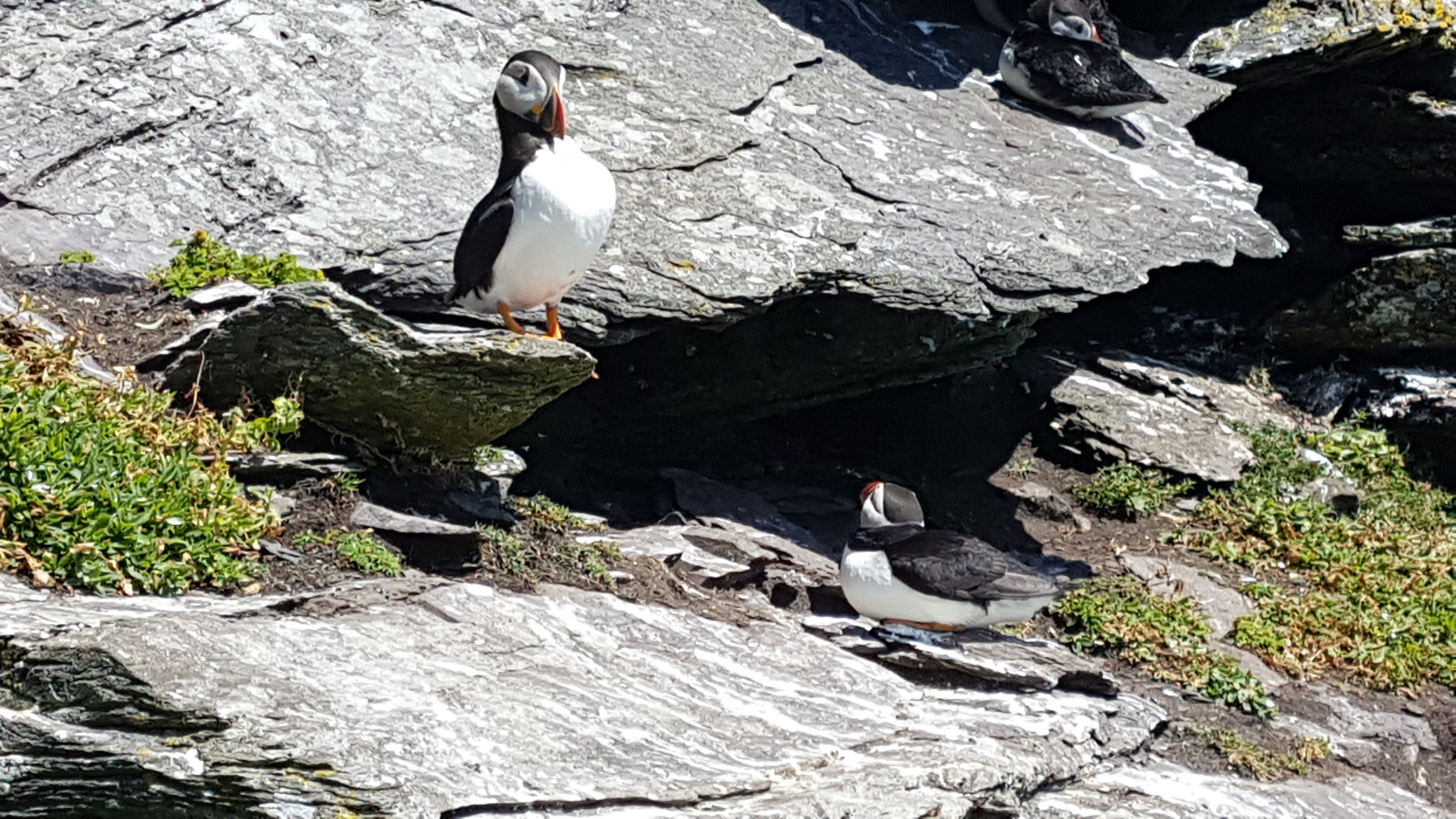
Puffins on Skellig Michael

The island hosts eyries for peregrine falcons. Other birds of interest include fulmars, Manx shearwaters (Puffinus puffinus), storm petrels, gannets, kittiwakes, guillemots and Atlantic puffins. A herd of goats lived on the island until recently, and it supports a population of rabbits and house mice, both relatively recent introductions, probably introduced in the 19th century by lighthouse attendants. Grey seals haul out on the island's ledges.

== History ==
=== Monastic ===
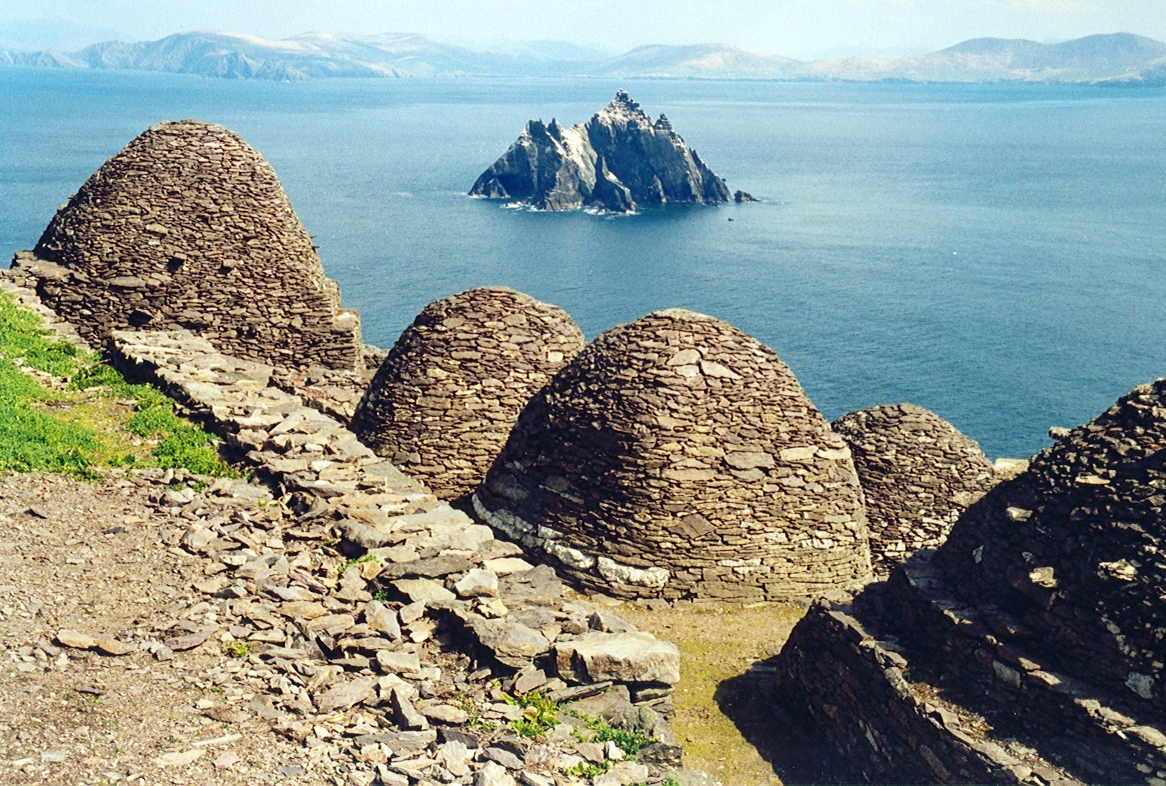
Skellig Michael Monastery

Monks of the Celtic Christian tradition founded a monastery on Skellig Michael sometime between the 6th and 8th centuries. Like many early Christian sites in Kerry, it is said to have been founded by Saint Fionán in the early 6th century, though historians doubt this. Many of the islands off the south-west coast of Ireland have early Christian monasteries; the region was favoured because of its isolation and the abundance of rock for building. There is a concentration of monasteries off the Iveragh and Dingle peninsulas.

The first definite reference to monastic activity on the island is a record of the death of "Suibhini of Skelig" dating from the 8th century. The Annals of the Four Masters detail events at the Skelligs between the 9th and 11th centuries. The annals record a Viking attack in 823, when "Skellig was plundered by the heathen and Eitgal [the abbot] was carried off and he died of hunger". The Vikings again attacked in 838, sacking churches at Skellig, Kenmare, and Innisfallen Island. The Augustinian abbey in Ballinskelligs was founded in 950, the same year that Blathmhac of Sceilic died. Finally, the annals mention the death of Aedh of Scelic-Mhichíl in 1040.

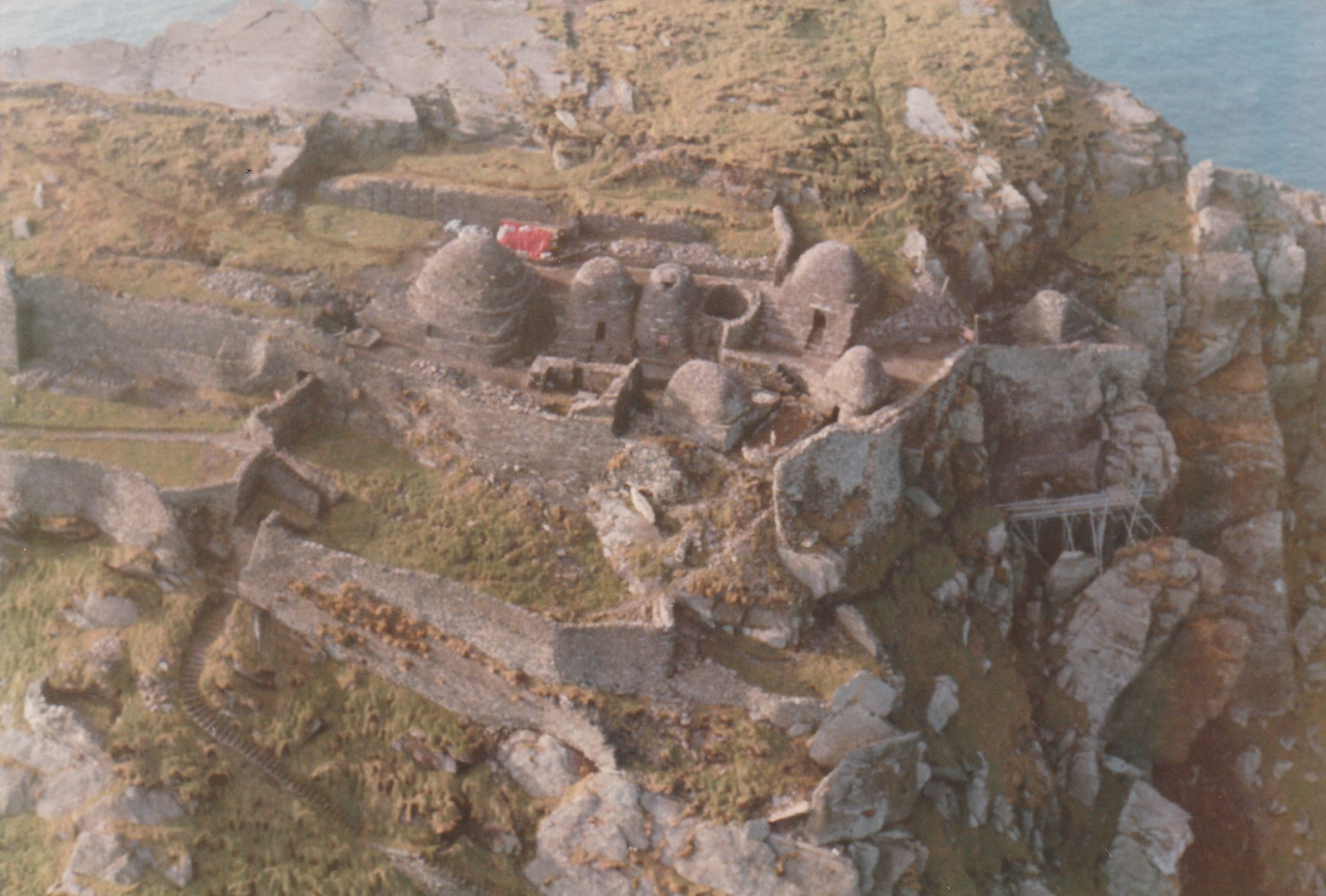
Beehive huts from the air in 1987

It has been estimated that no more than twelve monks and an abbot lived at the monastery at any one time. It was continuously occupied until the late 12th or early 13th century and remained a site for pilgrimage through to the modern era. The diet of the island monks was somewhat different from that of those on the mainland. With less arable land available to grow grain, vegetable gardens were an important part of monastic life. Of necessity, fish and the meat and eggs of birds nesting on the islands were staples. Theories for the site's abandonment include that the climate around Skellig Michael became colder and more prone to storms, Viking raids, and changes to the structure of the Irish Church. A combination of these factors likely prompted the community to abandon the island and move to the abbey in Ballinskelligs.

The site had been dedicated to Saint Michael the Archangel by at least 1044 (when the death of Aedh of Scelic-Mhichíl is recorded). However, this dedication may have occurred as early as 950, around which time a new church was added to the monastery (typically done to mark a consecration) and named Saint Michael's Church. The island may have been dedicated to Saint Michael, the legendary slayer of serpents, based on a link to Saint Patrick. A 13th-century German source claims that Skellig was the location of the last battle between Patrick and the venomous snakes that plagued Ireland.

Skellig Michael was a regular destination for pilgrims by the early 16th century.

=== Post-monastic ===
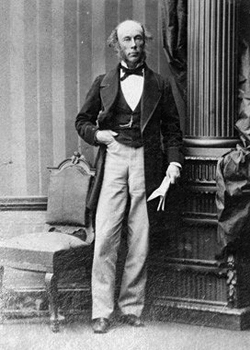
Edwin Wyndham-Quin, July 1861. Dunraven's Notes on Irish Architecture contains the first complete archaeological survey of the island.

Skellig Michael remained in the possession of the Catholic Canons Regular until the dissolution of Ballinskelligs Abbey in 1578, a result of the reformation enacted by Elizabeth I. Ownership of the islands passed to the Butler family, with whom it stayed until the early 1820s when the Corporation for Preserving and Improving the Port of Dublin (predecessor to the Commissioners of Irish Lights) purchased the island for £500 from John Butler of Waterville in a compulsory purchase order. The corporation constructed two lighthouses on the Atlantic side of the island, and associated living quarters, all of which were completed by 1826.

In 1871, Lord Dunraven, in his Notes on Irish Architecture, made the first comprehensive archaeological survey of the island. Describing the monastery, Dunraven wrote the island "is one so solemn and so sad that none should enter here but the pilgrim and the penitent. The sense of solitude, the vast heaven above and the sublime monotonous motion of the sea beneath would oppress the spirit, were not that spirit brought into harmony." He was less charitable of the lighthouse project and described their alterations as attributed to "the lighthouse workmen who...in 1838, built some objectionable modern walls". The Office of Public Works took the remains of the monastery into guardianship in 1880, before purchasing the island (with the exception of the lighthouses and associated structures) from the Commissioners of Irish Lights.

Skellig Michael was made a World Heritage Site in 1996. The International Council on Monuments and Sites (an advisory body of the World Heritage Committee) described Skellig Michael as of "exceptional universal value", and a "unique example of an early religious settlement", while also noting the site's preservation as a result of its "remarkable environment", and its ability to illustrate "as no other site can, the extremes of a Christian monasticism characterising much of North Africa, the Near East and Europe".

Historical population

| Year | Pop. |
|---|---|
| 1841 | 0 |
| 1851 | 0 |
| 1861 | 0 |
| 1871 | 0 |
| 1881 | 3 |
| 1891 | 4 |
| 1901 | 6 |
| 1911 | 11 |

| Year | Pop. |
|---|---|
| 1926 | 3 |
| 1936 | 2 |
| 1946 | 3 |
| 1951 | 3 |
| 1956 | 3 |
| 1961 | 3 |
| 1966 | 7 |
| 1971 | 3 |

| Year | Pop. |
|---|---|
| 1979 | 3 |
| 1981 | 3 |
| 1986 | 5 |
| 1991 | 0 |
| 1996 | 4 |
| 2002 | 0 |
| 2006 | 0 |

== Monastic features ==
=== Monastery ===
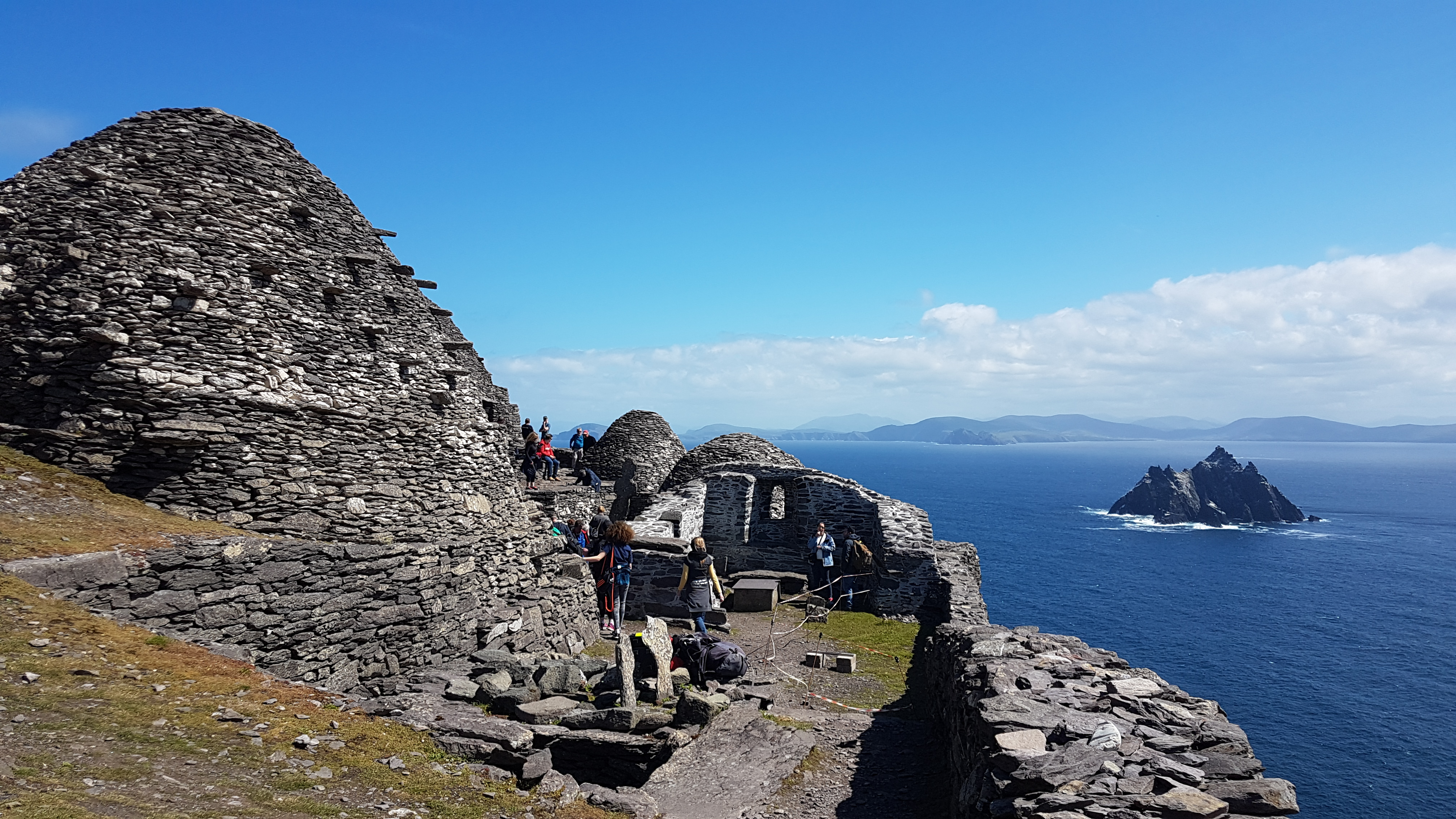
Full view of the monastery complex with garden terrace at front

The monastery is built into a terraced shelf 180 m (600 ft) above sea level. It contains two oratories, a cemetery, crosses, cross-slabs, six clochán-type domed beehive cells (one of which has fallen), and a medieval church. The cells and oratories are all of dry-built corbel construction, whereas the church, which was constructed at a later date, is of mortared stone.

==== Cells ====
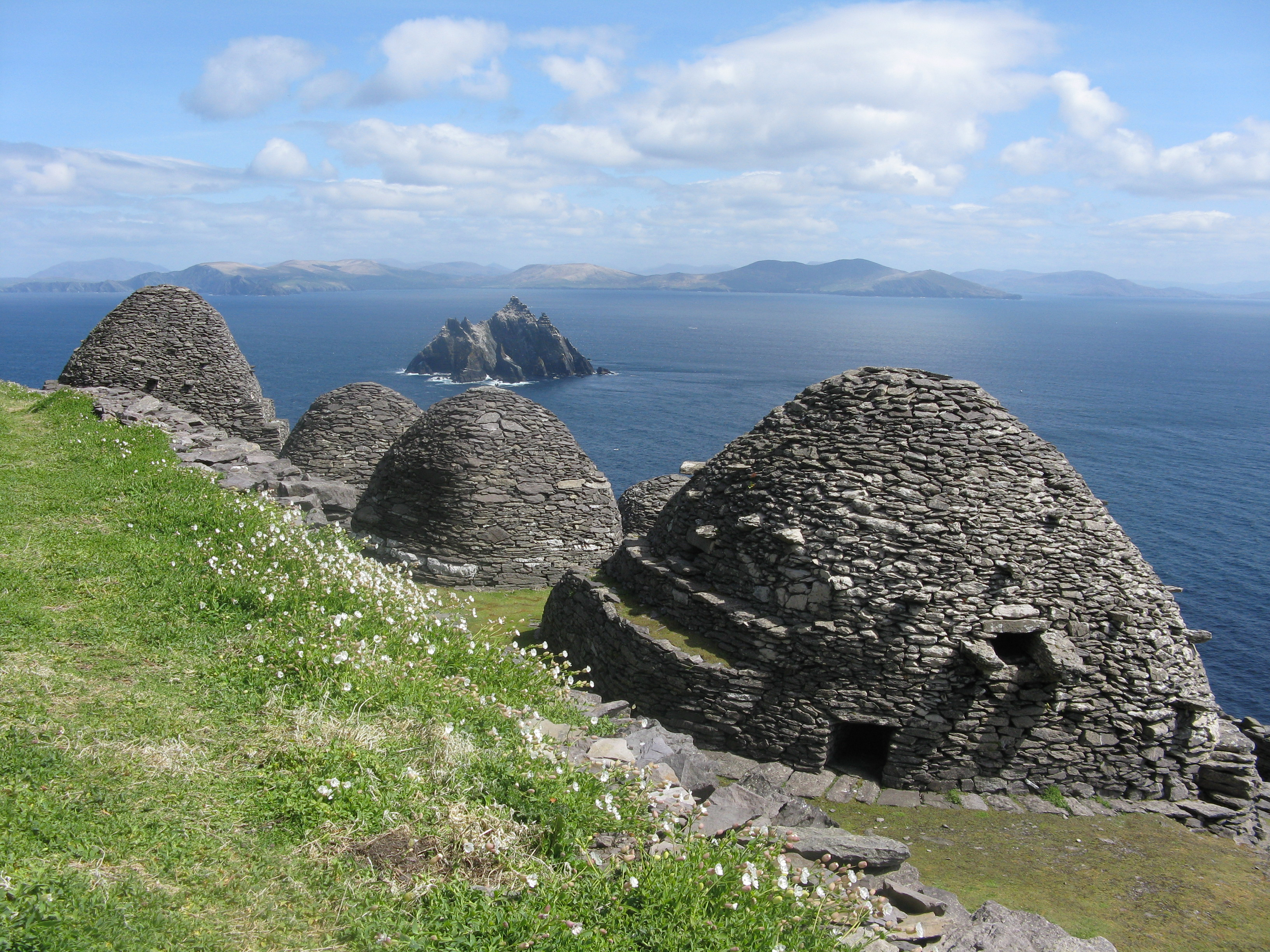
Clocháns; dry-stone huts with corbel roofs

The largest hut, known as cell A, has a floor area of 14.5 × 3.8 metres and is 5 metres high. Like the other huts, its internal walls are straight before narrowing to accommodate its dome roof. The protruding stones in the interior act as pegs, placed about 2.5 metres apart to support the roof, and in some instances may have supported upstairs living quarters. The protruding stones on the exterior most likely were anchors for thatch roofing. Some cells contain recesses that may have been formed to contain cupboards. The main oratory is boat-shaped and measures 3.6 × 4.3 metres. It has an altar and a small window on its eastern wall. The small oratory is situated on its own terrace, at a relative distance from the main complex. It measures 2.4 × 1.8 × 2.4 metres and contains a low door (0.9 × 0.5 metres) and a comparatively large, one-metre-high window on its north-eastern wall.

==== St Michael's Church ====
St. Michael's Church dates to the 10th or early 11th century. It was originally constructed from mostly lime mortar with imported sandstone from Valentia Island. Today, it is mostly collapsed, with only its eastern window still standing. The centre of the church contains a modern gravestone, dated 1871, erected for members of the family of one of the lighthouse keepers.

==== Monk's Graveyard ====
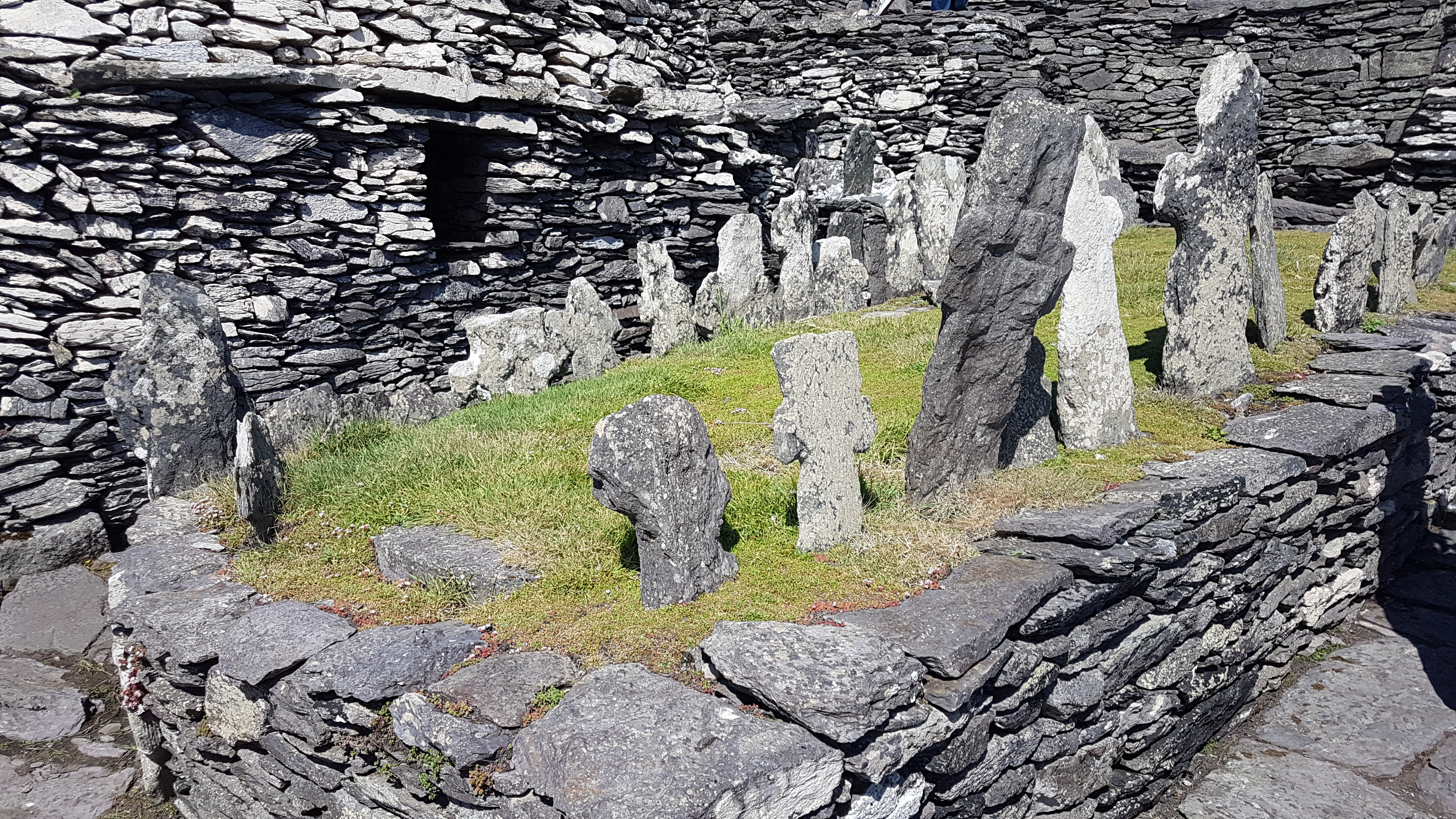
The Monks Graveyard

The Monk's Graveyard is partially collapsed and smaller than when it was in active use. It contains stone crosses with mostly plain, inscribed decorative patterns on its west side; two are highly detailed and believed to be early features of the site. In total, over a hundred individual stone crosses have been found on the island. There are several large orthostats on its north and west sides. There are two dry stone leachta on the site. The larger is positioned between Saint Michael's Church and the main Oratory, and is thought to predate both; it once had a large upright cross at its western end, which is now broken off. The other is located against the monastery retaining wall at the south of the oratory. Human remains have been found underneath both.

==== Oratory ====
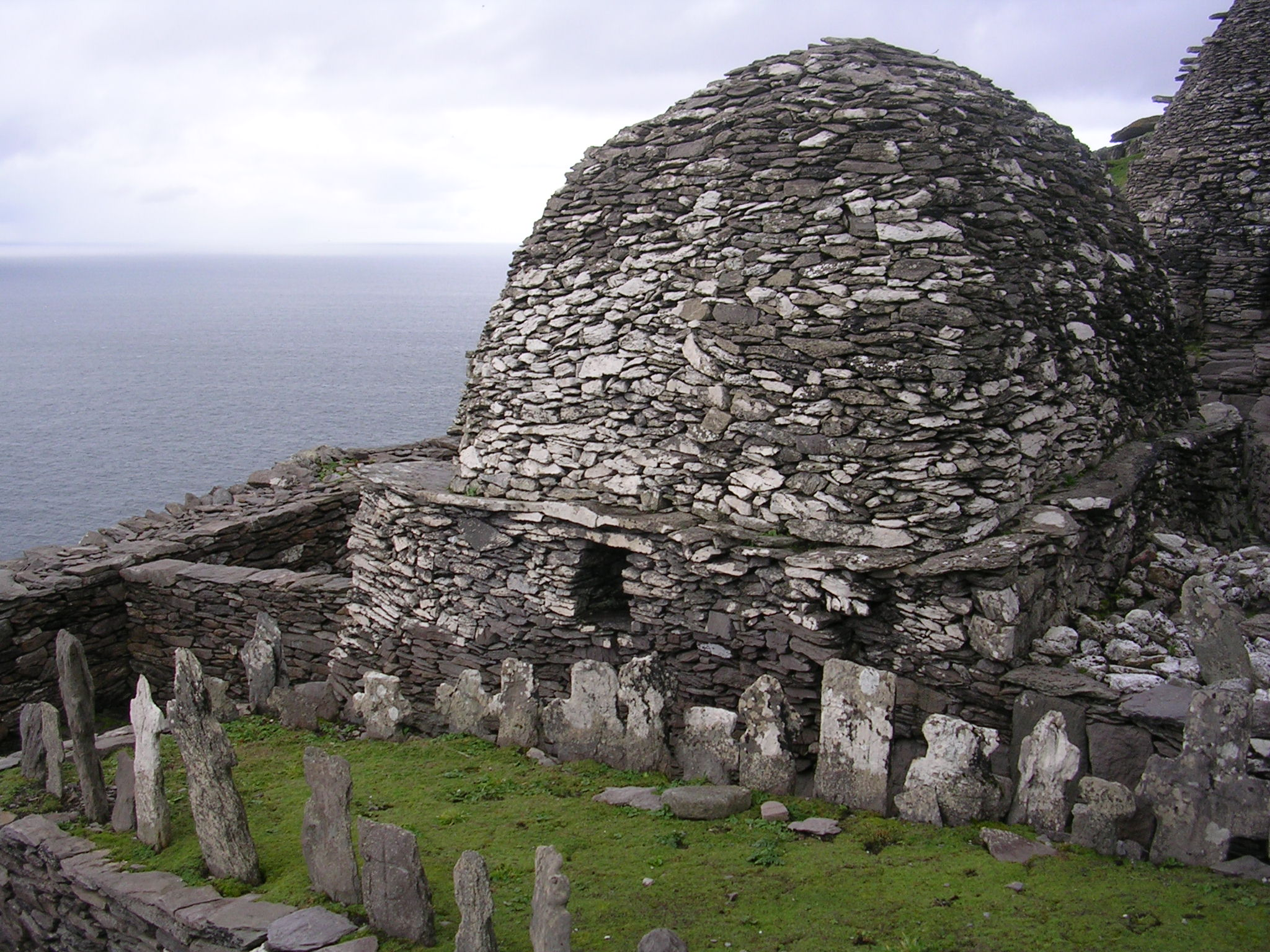
Graveyard and large oratory

The oratory is two hundred metres above sea level and fifteen metres below the summit,, and is the largest and in good condition. The main oratory is still largely intact and contains its original altar, bench, a water cistern and what is likely the remnants of a shrine. The masonry work is typical of the Early Christian period in Ireland.

The interior of the main building is 2.3 m (7 ft 7 in) long and 1.2 m (3 ft 11 in) wide. The enclosure wall is made mostly of small stones. Although it is now worn and mostly collapsed, it was once around 1.5 m (4 ft 11 in) high. Today the interior is full of stone rubble fallen from the structure and the fragments of a 2.14 m (7 ft 0 in) tall stone cross. The leacht outside of it was probably used as a shrine or altar; it is too small to have been a burial site.

=== Hermitage ===
The hermitage is located on the opposite side of the island from the monastery. It was built below the south peak and is significantly more difficult and hazardous to approach. Today, access is restricted and permitted only after prior arrangement. The south peak is approached from Christ's Saddle via a very narrow and steep series of rock-cut steps. Exposed and unprotected, the steps are vulnerable to fierce winds that at times approach hurricane force. The pathway passes through the Needle's Eye, a rock chimney formed by a narrow vertical crack in the peak.

Though the hermitage's origins and history are not as well studied as those of the monastery, it seems likely that it was built later, given the presumed difficulty of its construction, which would have involved moving large pieces of stone. These would have had to be carried up almost sheer cliff faces, so the builders would have needed the monastery as a base. The eroding effect of frost on the island's major fault line provided the masons with large amounts of materials for the construction.

The hermitage consists of several enclosures and platforms situated on three main terraces cut into the rock. These are today known as the Oratory, Garden and Outer Terraces.

=== Outer terrace ===
The outer terrace is situated on three stepped ledges some distance from the main complex and is difficult to access. Its only masonry is a 17 m (56 ft) wall along its steep, exposed perimeter. Wondering why such an inaccessible and harsh outpost might have been built, the historian Walter Horn wrote that "the goal of an ascetic was not comfort" and recalled that the Cambrai Homily states: "This is our denial of ourselves, if we do not indulge our desires and if we abjure our sins. This is our taking-up of our cross upon us if we receive loss and martyrdom and suffering for Christ's sake."

=== Stairs and paths ===
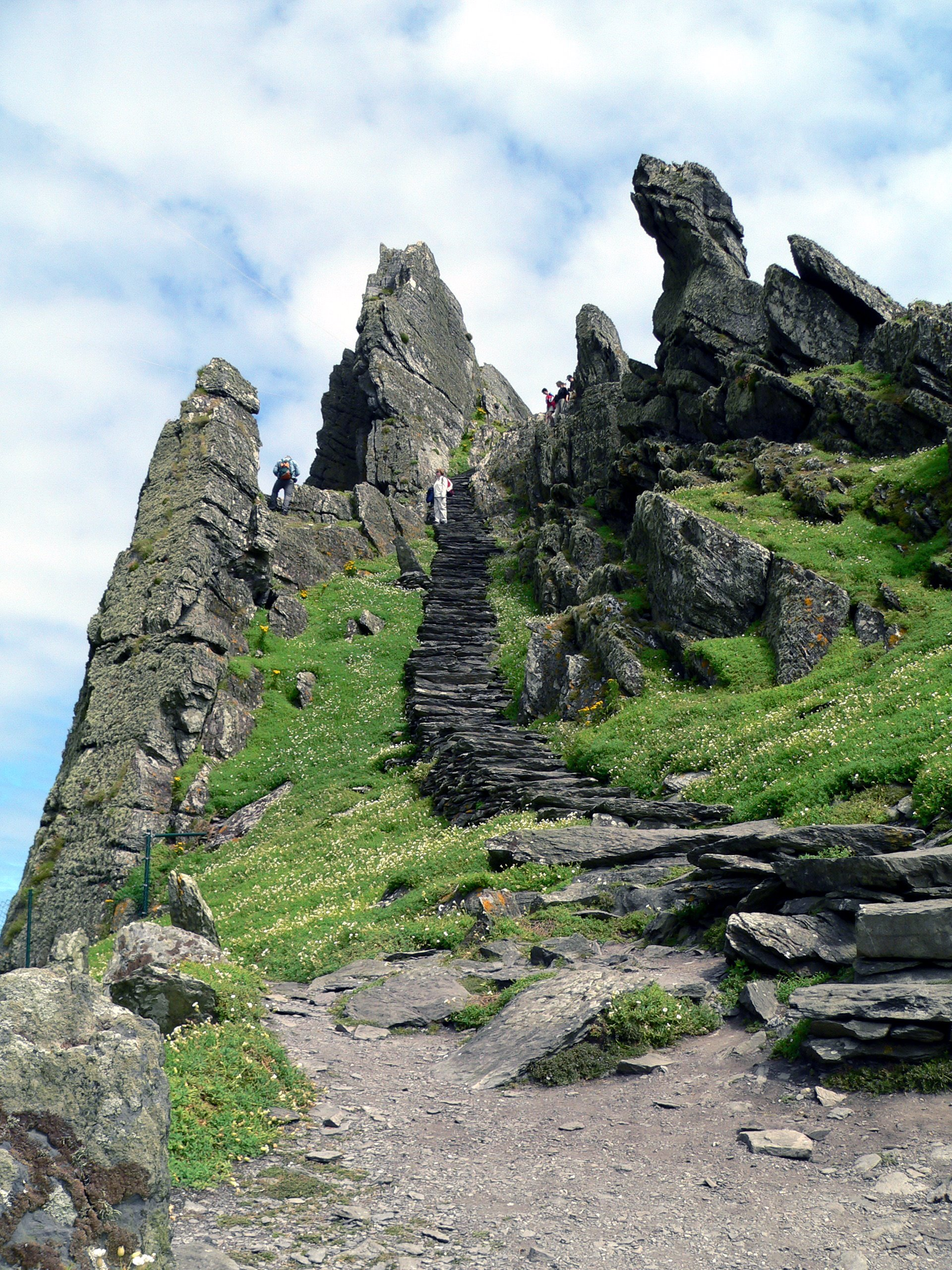
Path to Christ's Saddle

Each of the three landing areas leads to long flights of steps (known as the east, south and north steps) built by the first generations of monks to inhabit the island. They may have once formed part of a larger network; traces of other, possibly earlier steps have been uncovered elsewhere on the island. Archaeological evidence shows that basal sections of each series of steps were rock-cut, giving way to more stable dry stone masonry once they reached an altitude where the sea waves would no longer weather them. Later the base steps were replaced with dry-stone paths.

The north steps lead from Blue Cove and consist of two long, steep, continuous flights known as the upper and lower steps. The upper pathway was built from dry stone but is in very poor condition in places; given the steep face on which it is built, it is prone to erosion and to impacts from falling stone from the cliffs directly above. The lower rock-cut portion has been heavily weathered by the sea, and some of the ground around it has collapsed; the portions where steps are lost have been replaced with ramps. A parapet at their lowest base was added in the 1820s, and they were widened during the construction of the lighthouse.

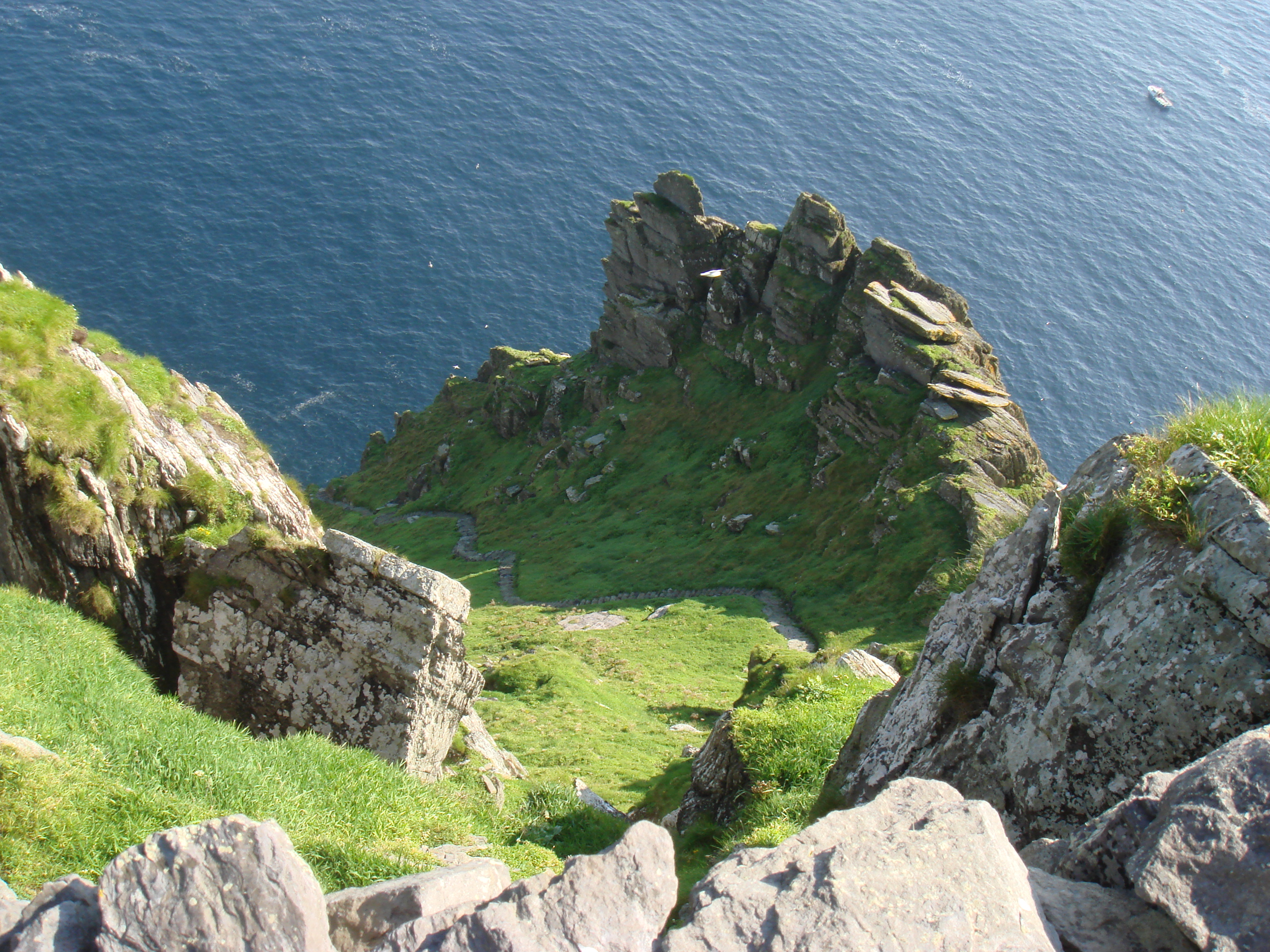
View of the south steps

The south steps are most commonly used today and merge with the north steps at Christ's Saddle, leading to the monastery. They cross several archaeological features, including a prayer station and walling. They are in good condition and were probably repaired by the lighthouse builders. Their weakest point, directly above Christ's Saddle, suffers wear and tear from continual use by modern visitors and requires continual maintenance. The landing steps may have been built by the lighthouse builders; 14 steps apart from the main landing are virtually inaccessible, stopping short at both ends and leading neither to the sea nor to the highest levels.

The lower part of the east steps above Blind Man's Cove was heavily blasted with dynamite in 1820 during the construction of the pier and Lighthouse Road, and are now inaccessible from the landing point. The steps above this level, on a very steep climb along a sheer face, have been subject to conservation, most recently in 2002/2003 when large amounts of overgrowth were removed, and are today in good condition.

== In culture ==
In the first episode of the 1969 BBC documentary Civilisation: A Personal View by Kenneth Clark, the art historian Kenneth Clark described the island's buildings and pathways as "an extraordinary achievement of courage and tenacity". He observed that "looking back from the great civilizations of twelfth-century France or seventeenth-century Rome, it is hard to believe, that for quite a long time—almost a hundred years—western Christianity survived by clinging to places like Skellig Michael, a pinnacle of rock eighteen miles from the Irish coast, rising 700 feet [210 m] out of the sea". Adam Nicolson details the island in his 2004 book Seamanship: A Voyage Along the Wild Coasts of the British Isles. The photographer Peter Cox published The Skelligs: Islands on the Edge of the World in 2020, a collection photographed on and around the islands over nearly a decade.

Several films and documentaries have used the island as a filming location. The island was used to film the planet Ahch-To in Star Wars: The Force Awakens (2015) and Star Wars: The Last Jedi (2017). Aerial footage of the island was also used in Star Wars: The Rise of Skywalker (2019). It also served as a location for the final scene in Heart of Glass (1976).

== Access and tourism ==
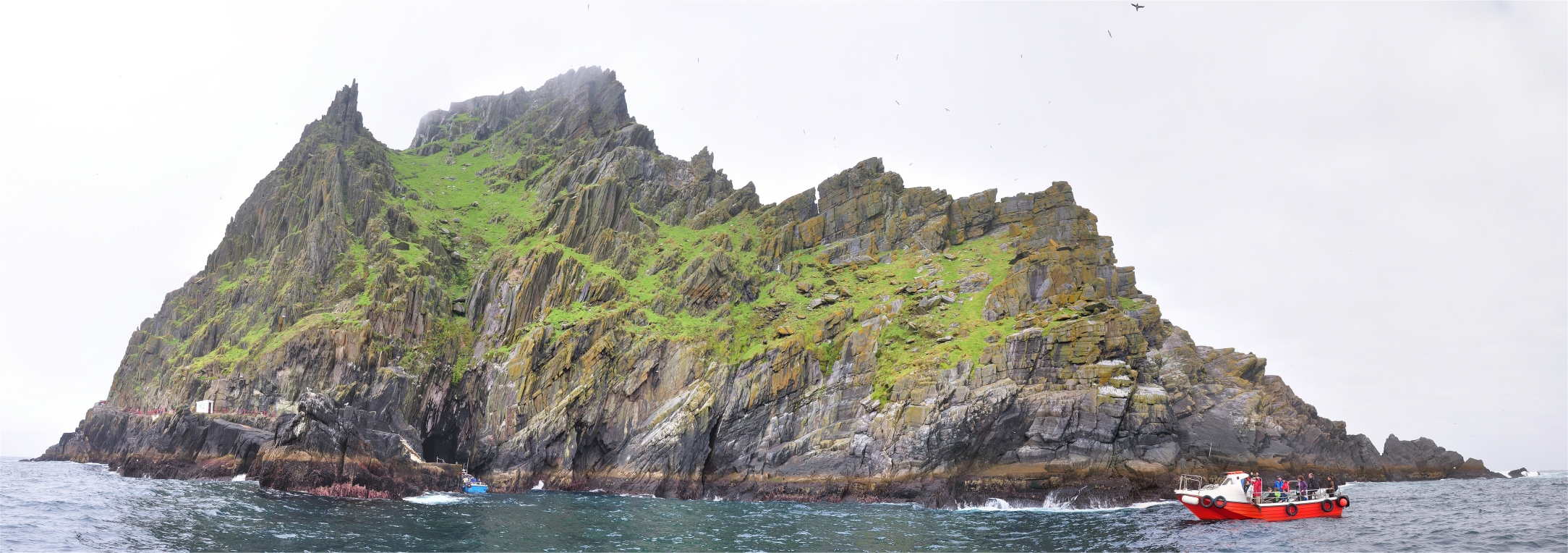
Tour boats approaching the island

Skellig Michael has three landing points, used according to prevailing weather conditions. The island receives an average of 11,000 visitors per year; to protect the site, the Office of Public Works limits visitors to 180 per day. The local climate and exposed terrain make the crossing from the mainland to Skellig Michael difficult. Once landed, the island's pathways are steep and unprotected. The main pathway to the island's peak consists of 600 stone steps.

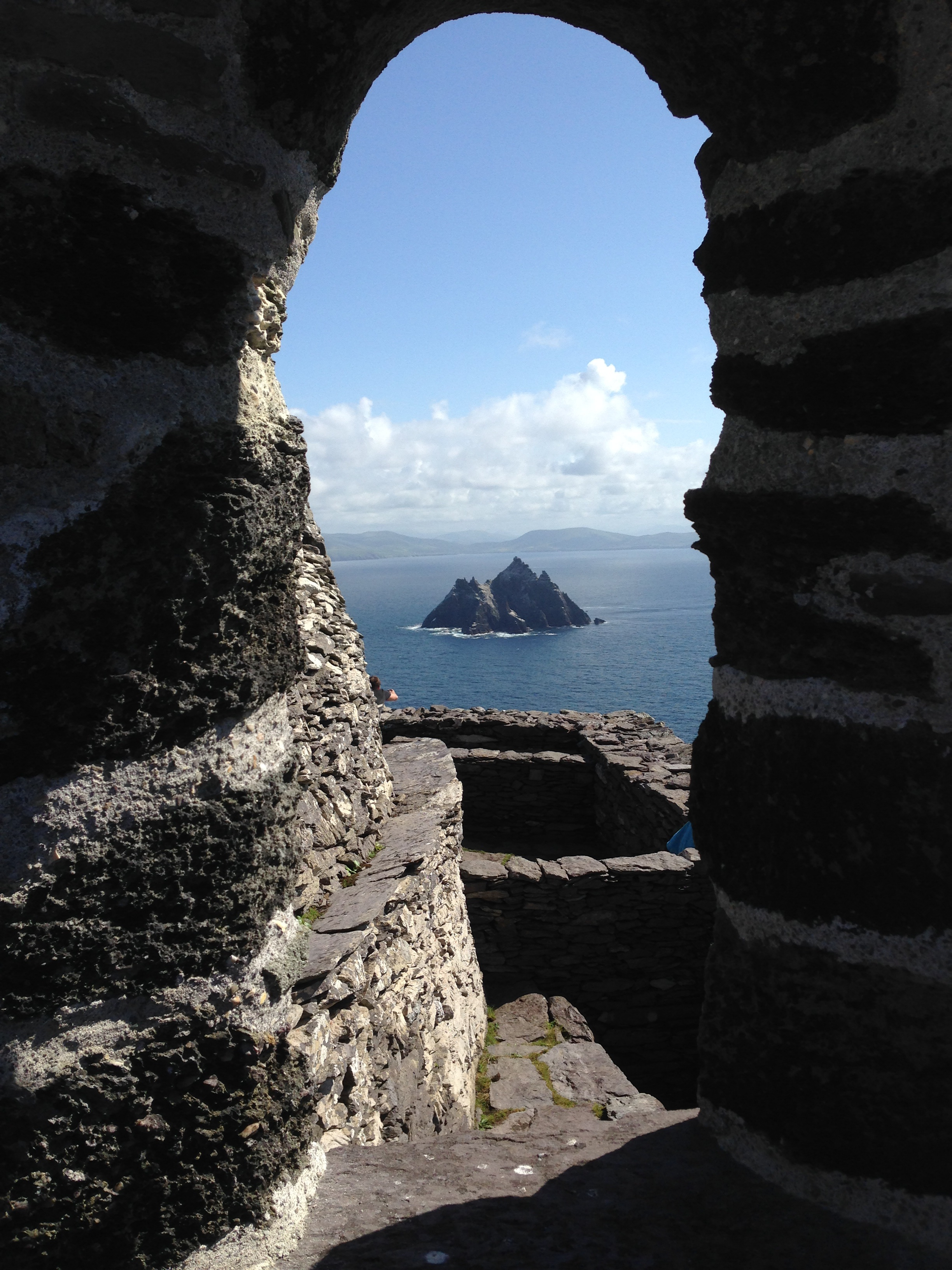
View of Skellig Beag from inside the monastery's large oratory

Skellig Michael's remoteness and inaccessibility have long discouraged visitors, and thus it is exceptionally well preserved. Tourism began in the late 19th century when rowing boats could be hired for 25 shillings. It became a popular tourist destination in the early 1970s when regular chartered passenger boats became available. By 1990, demand had grown to the extent that the Office of Public Works was organising ten boats departing from four individual mainland harbours.

Today, at least four boat licences are granted to tour operators who run trips to Skellig Michael during the summer season (May to October, inclusive), weather permitting. Even when conditions on the mainland are calm, the sea around the island can be turbulent. The area is a landing point for sea swells travelling in from distant depressions in the Atlantic. The island is lashed by water from all sides, with wave crests breaking at up to 10 metres over the pier and 45 metres along the lighthouse. When such large wave troughs recede, they can often expose ragged seaweed stumps, sponges and sea anemones on the rock faces, further hampering approach and landing.

A typical visit lasts about six hours. The Office of Public Works emphasises that the journey presents safety challenges, mainly because the steps are steep, rocky, old and unprotected. Climbing is not allowed in wet or windy weather. Dive sites immediately around the rock, mostly around Blue Cove, are permitted in summer.

According to some reports, climate change has led to increased rainfall, sea swells, and more frequent severe storms around the island, and future tourism is likely to be affected by these factors.

== Gallery ==
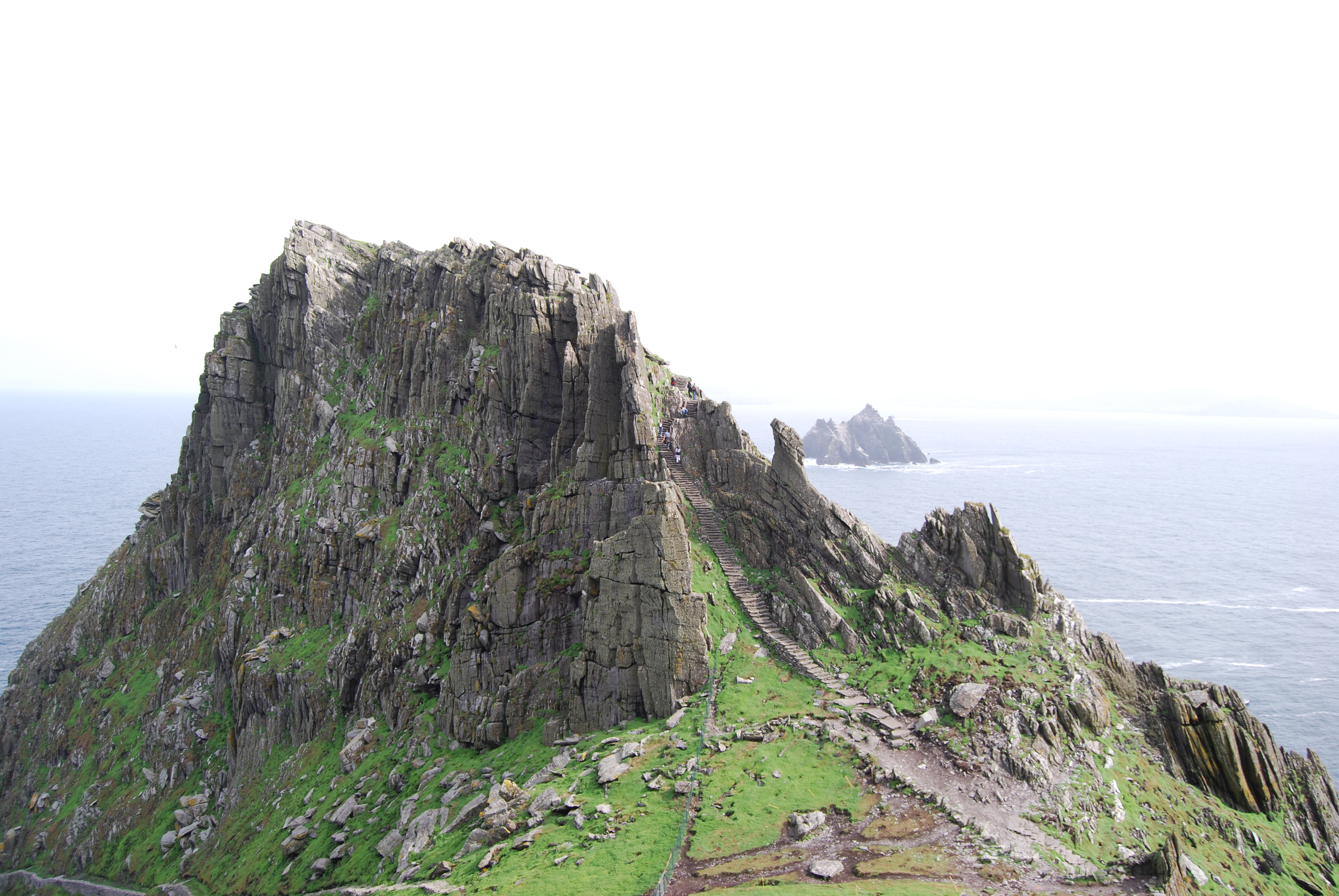
Steps leading to the peak

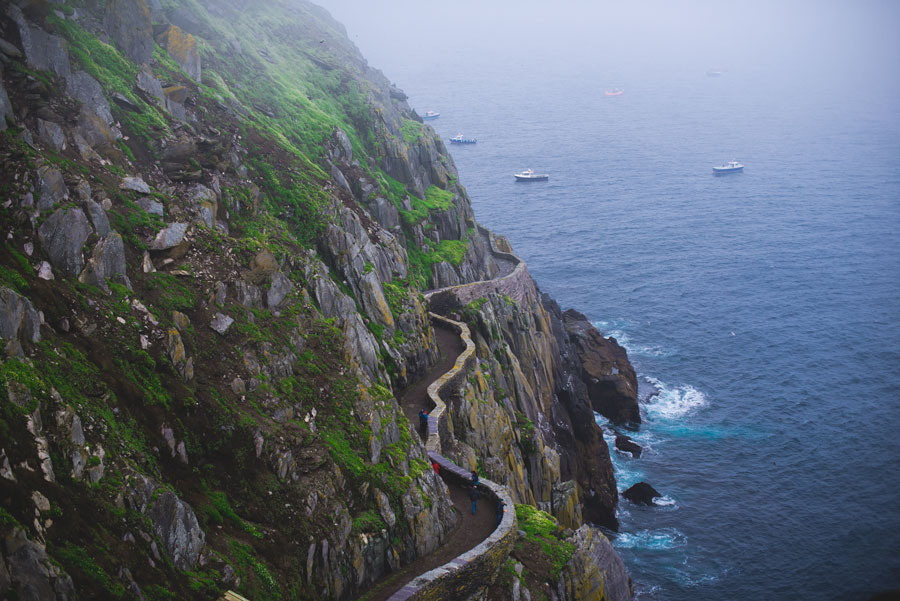
Path on the cliff face

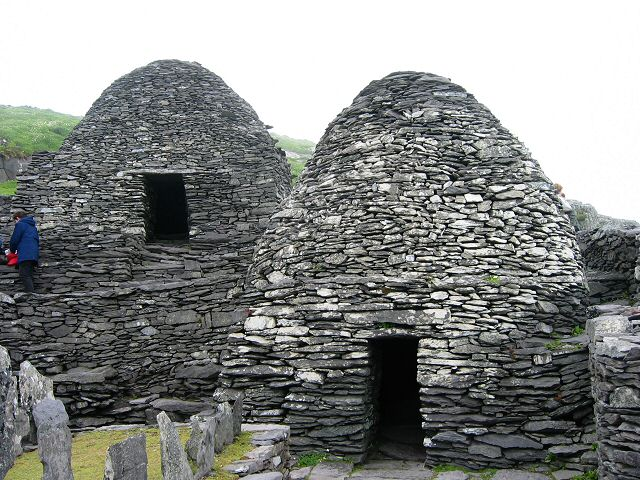
Monk's cells

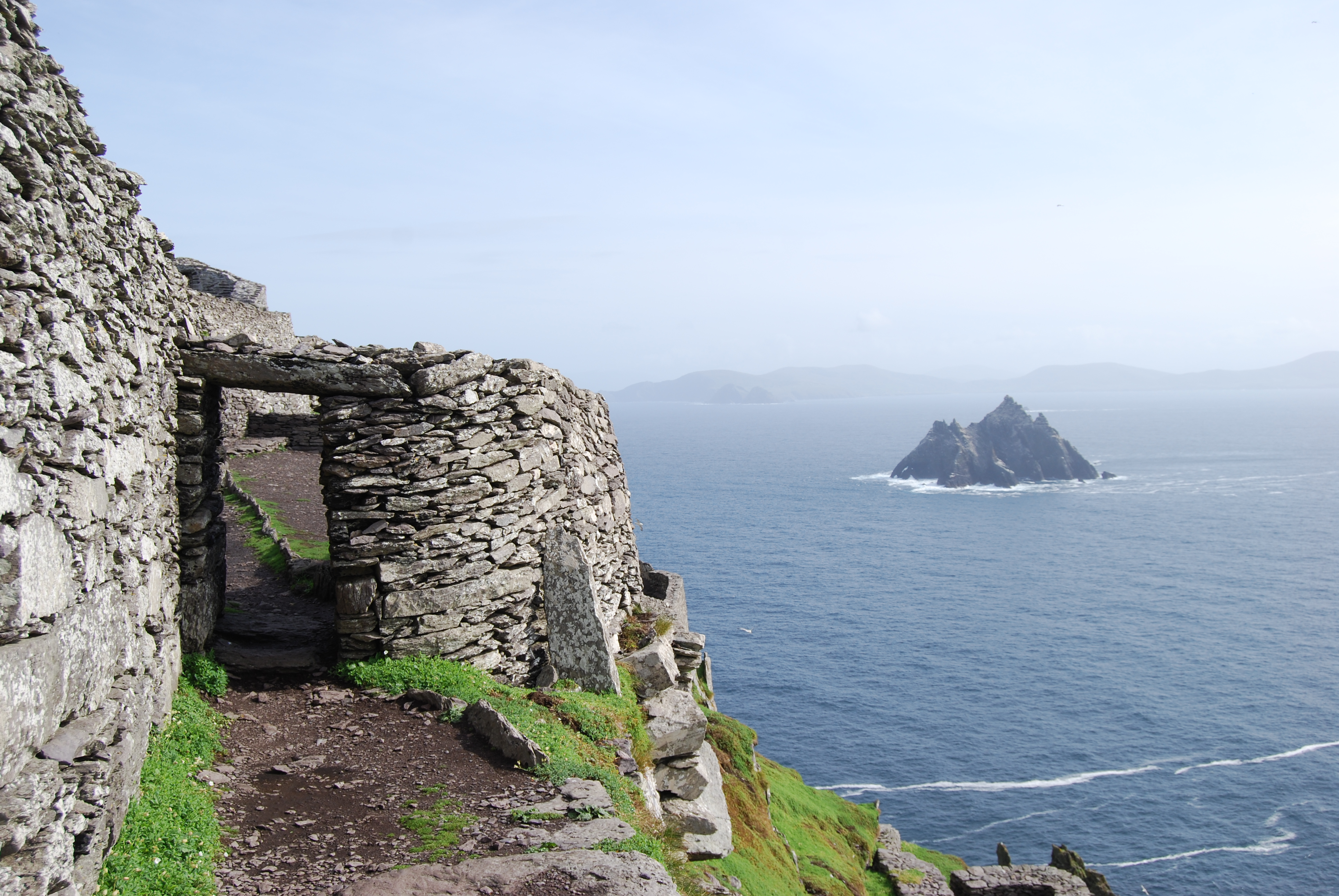
Entrance to the monastery complex

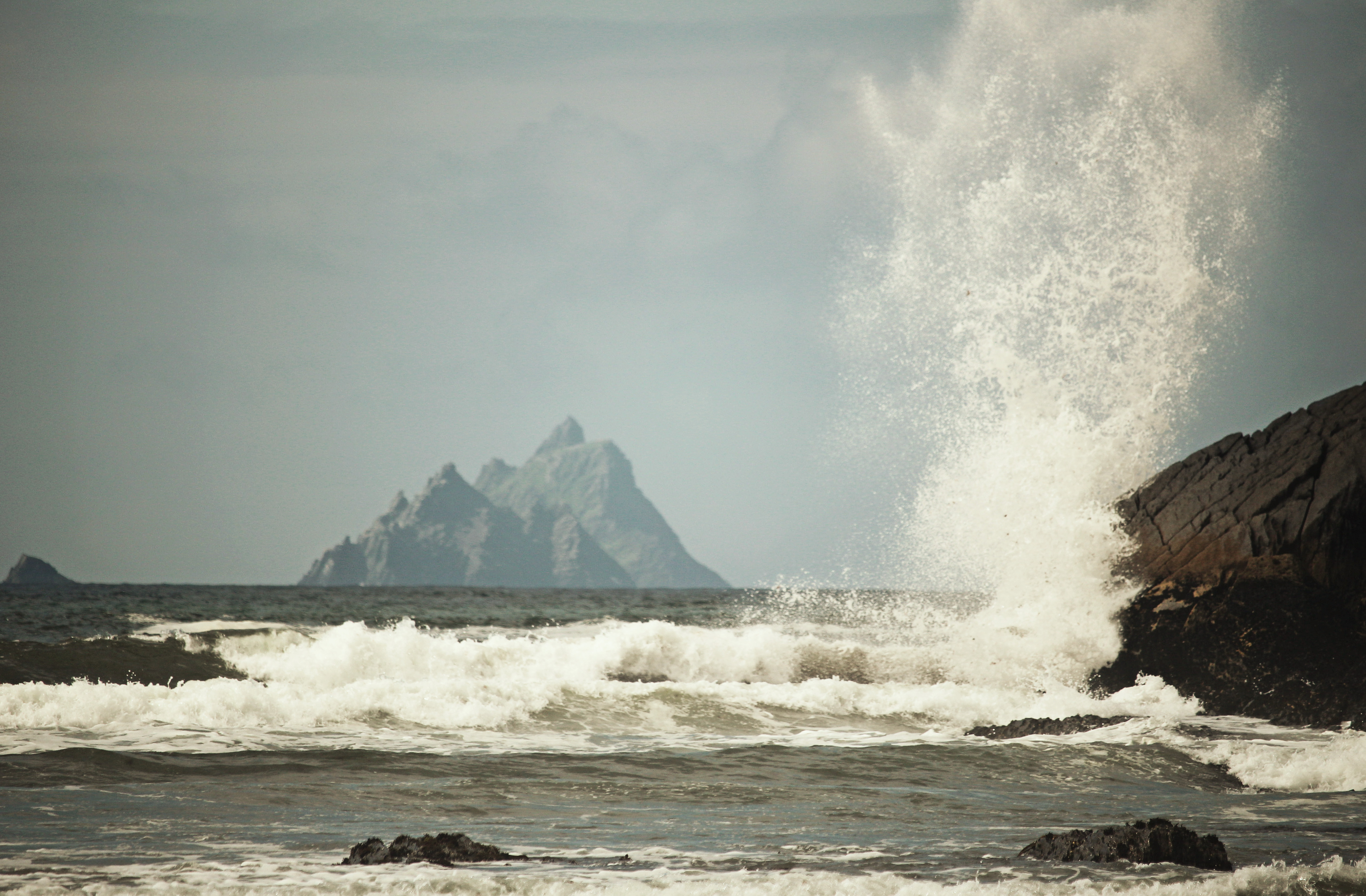
View of the island from the coast

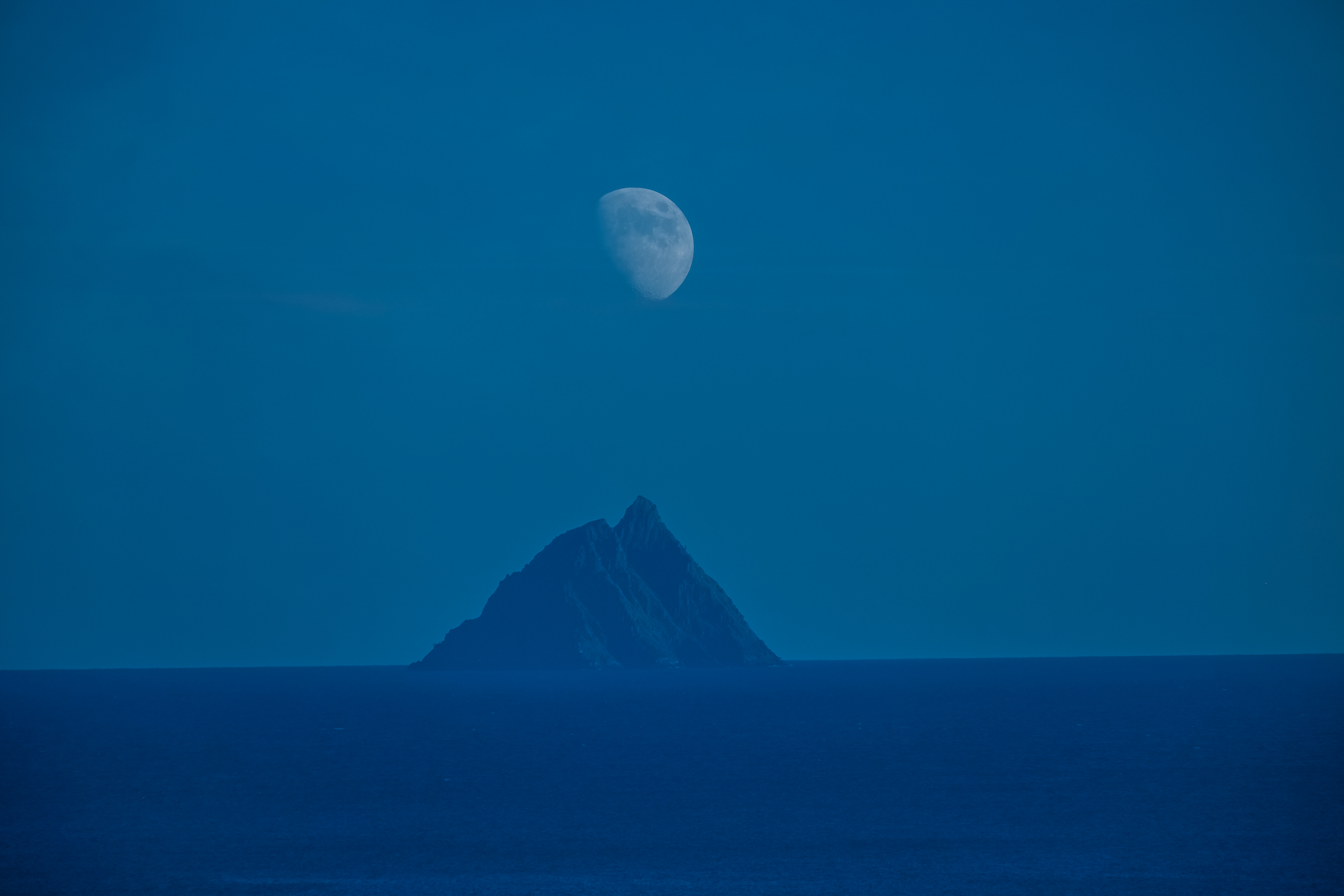
Night view
