= Little Skellig =

Island in the Atlantic Ocean

Native name: Sceilig Bheag
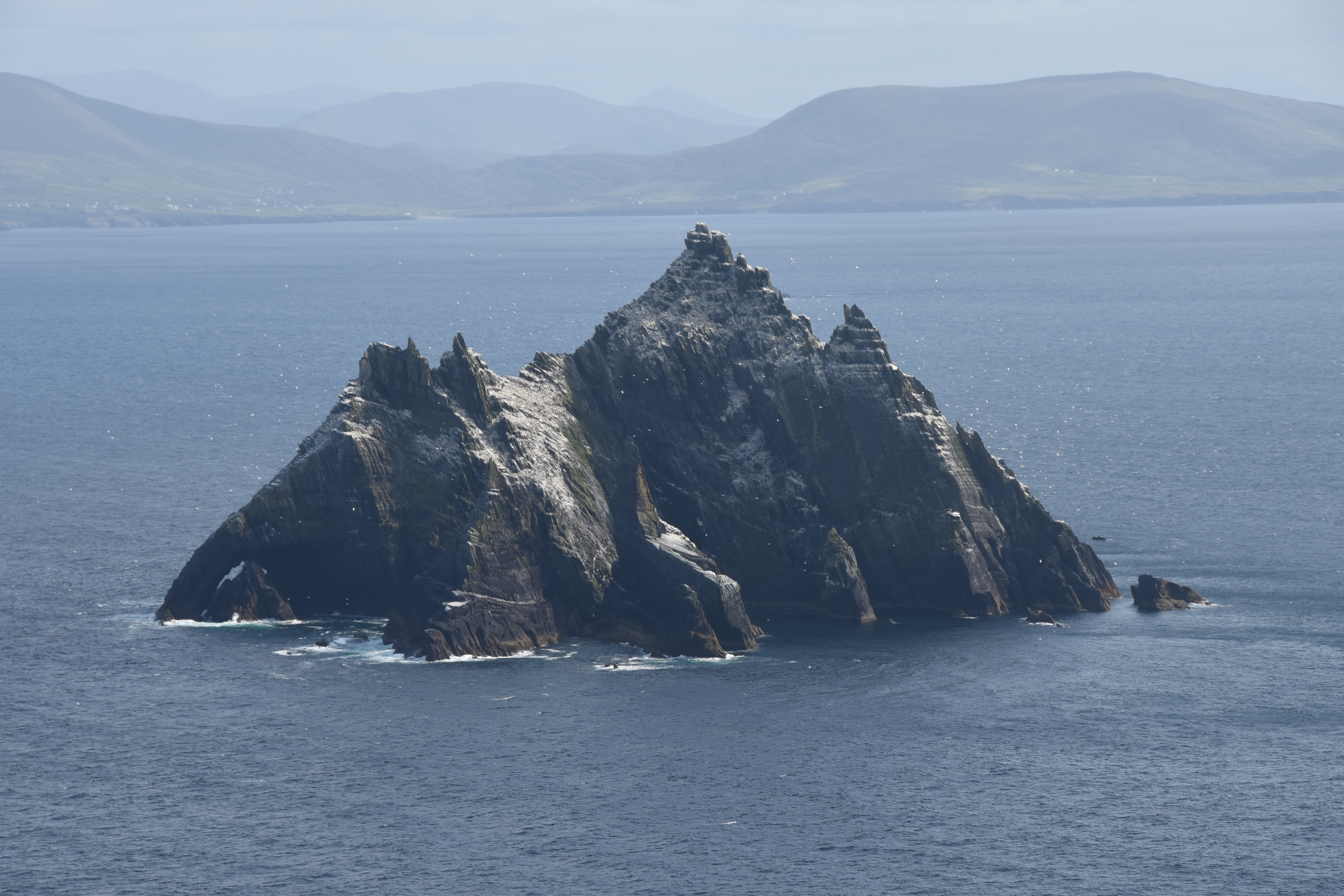
- Little Skellig

- Location within island of Ireland

Geography
- Location: Atlantic Ocean
- Coordinates: 51.766°N 10.533°W
- Area: 8 ha (20 acres)
- Highest elevation: 134 m (440 ft)

Administration
- Ireland
- County: Kerry

Demographics
- Population: 0

Little Skellig (Irish: Sceilig Bheag) is a small, steep rocky island in the Atlantic Ocean, 11 km off the Iveragh Peninsula of County Kerry, Ireland. It is one of the two Skellig Islands, together with the larger Skellig Michael. Little Skellig is a nature reserve and bird colony. Landing on Little Skellig is not allowed.

== Geography ==
Little Skellig is the smaller of the two Skellig Islands, the other being Skellig Michael, 1 km to the south-west. The islands rose c. 374–360 million years ago during a period of mountain formation, along with the MacGillycuddy's Reeks mountain range. Later, they were separated from the mainland by rising water levels.

== Wildlife ==
The island has a large bird population, including a colony of northern gannets which is the largest in Ireland, and one of the largest in the world. The island, together with Skellig Michael, is part of a 364 ha Important Bird Area established by BirdWatch Ireland in 2000. BirdWatch Ireland has designated Little Skellig as a nature preserve. It houses over 35,000 breeding pairs of gannets.

== Sources ==
- Bourke, Edward; Hayden, Alan; Lynch, Ann; O'Sullivan, Michael (2011). Skellig Michael, Co. Kerry: The Monastery and South Peak: Archaeological Stratigraphic Report: Excavations 1986–2010 (PDF). Dublin: Department of Culture, Heritage and the Gaeltacht. OCLC 795846647.
- "Skellig Michael World Heritage Site Management Plan : 2008–2018". Department of the Environment, Heritage and Local Government. 2008. OCLC 916003677.
