= Skellig Islands =

Two islands off the south-west coast of Ireland

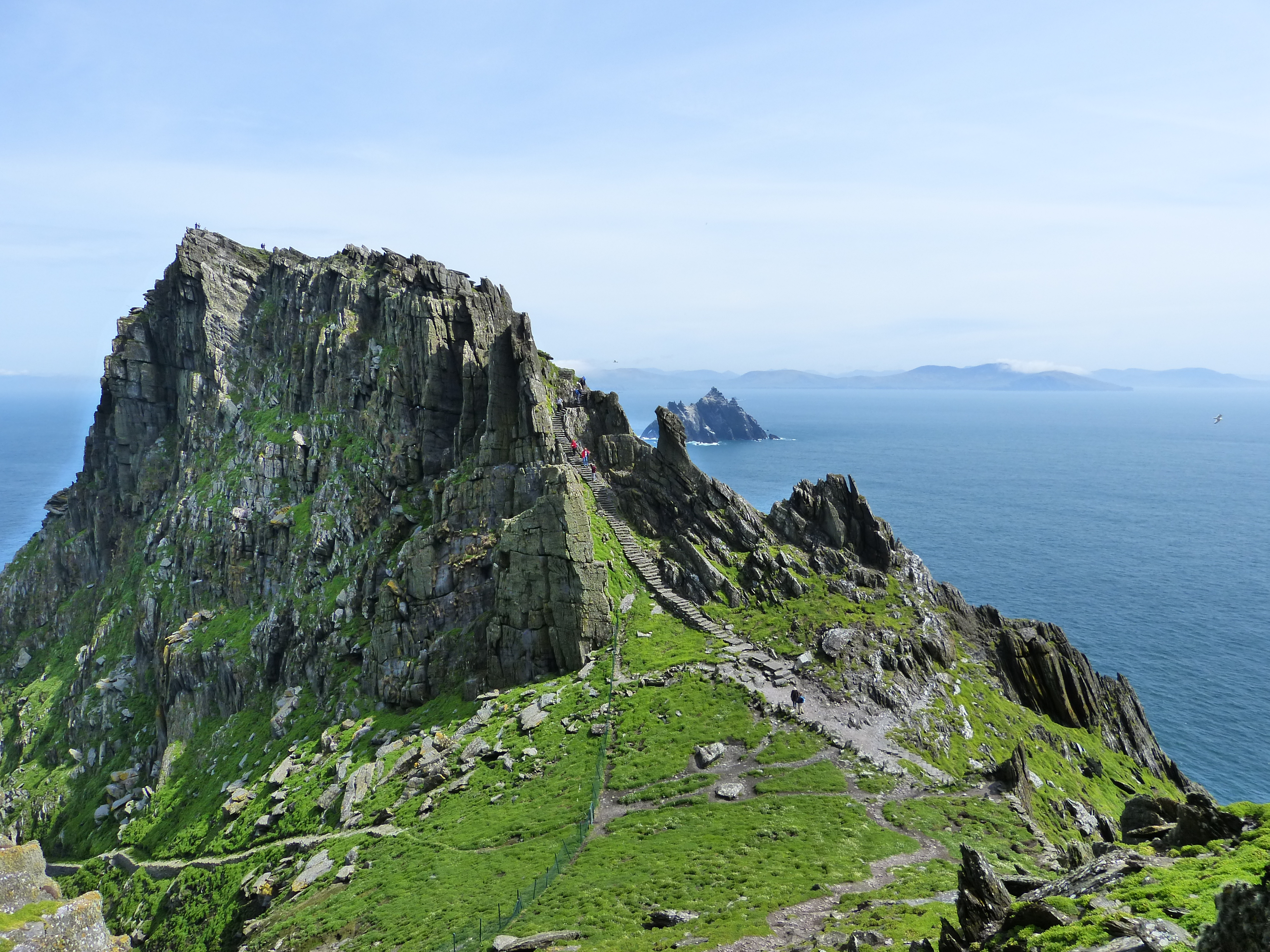
- Skellig Michael, with Little Skellig behind

- Location within island of Ireland

Geography
- Location: Atlantic Ocean
- Coordinates: 51°46′N 10°32′W
- Total islands: 2
- Major islands: Skellig Michael; Little Skellig

Administration
- Ireland
- County: Kerry

Demographics
- Population: 0

The Skellig Islands (Irish: Na Scealaga), historically "the Skellocks", are two small, steep, and rocky islands lying about 13 km (8 mi) west of Bolus Head off the Iveragh Peninsula in County Kerry, Ireland. The larger of the two is Skellig Michael (also known as Great Skellig), famous for an early Christian monastery that is a UNESCO World Heritage Site. Together with Little Skellig, they make up a 364-hectare (899-acre) Important Bird Area.

== Skellig Michael ==
The larger of the two islands, Skellig Michael (Irish: Sceilig Mhichíl) is also known as Great Skellig in English. It has two peaks rising to over 230 m (750 ft) above sea level. With a sixth-century Christian monastery perched at 160 m (520 ft) on a ledge near the top of the lower peak, Skellig Michael is designated as a UNESCO World Heritage Site.

Birdwatch Ireland were concerned that the Irish government allowed filming on a seabird sanctuary without third party consent. During the 2014 nesting season, black-legged kittiwake chicks in nests were swept into the sea by the downdraught from a helicopter and devoured by gulls.

== Little Skellig ==
The smaller of the two islands is Little Skellig (Sceilig Bheag in Irish). (grid reference V268618) It is Ireland's largest northern gannet (Morus bassanus) colony with almost 30,000 pairs, and is closed to the public. It is also one of the world's largest northern gannet colonies, and is of international importance. The island's highest point is 134 m (440 ft) above sea level and is located approximately 1.5 km (1 mi) east-northeast of the island of Skellig Michael.

== Wildlife ==
Both of the Skellig islands are known for their seabird colonies, and together compose one of the most important seabird sites in Ireland, both for the population size and for the species diversity. The islands have been designated an Important Bird Area (IBA) by BirdLife International because they support breeding populations of several species of seabirds. Among the breeding birds are European storm petrel, northern gannet, northern fulmar, Manx shearwater, black-legged kittiwake, common guillemot, razorbill and Atlantic puffin (with 4,000 or more puffins on Great Skellig alone). Red-billed choughs and peregrine falcons can also be seen.

The surrounding waters have abundant wildlife with many Grey seals. Basking sharks, minke whales, dolphins (Delphinidae), beaked whales and leatherback sea turtles have also been recorded. The islands have many interesting recreational diving sites due to the clear water, an abundance of life, and underwater cliffs down to 60 m (200 feet).

== In popular culture ==
The Skellig Islands served as a location in the 1976 film Heart of Glass, directed and produced by Werner Herzog, where the islands feature in one of the prophecies by the seer Hias.

Certain scenes from the 2012 film Byzantium were also filmed here.

The final scene of Star Wars: The Force Awakens was shot on Skellig in July 2015, with additional filming taking place there in September 2015 for The Last Jedi, the following film in the series. The remains of the Skellig Michael monastery appear in the film, representing an ancient Jedi temple.

In the Witcher fantasy literature series and its related video games, 'Skellige' is an archipelago visited by protagonist Geralt of Rivia. In the video game The Witcher 3: Wild Hunt, the inhabitants of the islands can be heard speaking with an Irish accent.

== Gallery ==
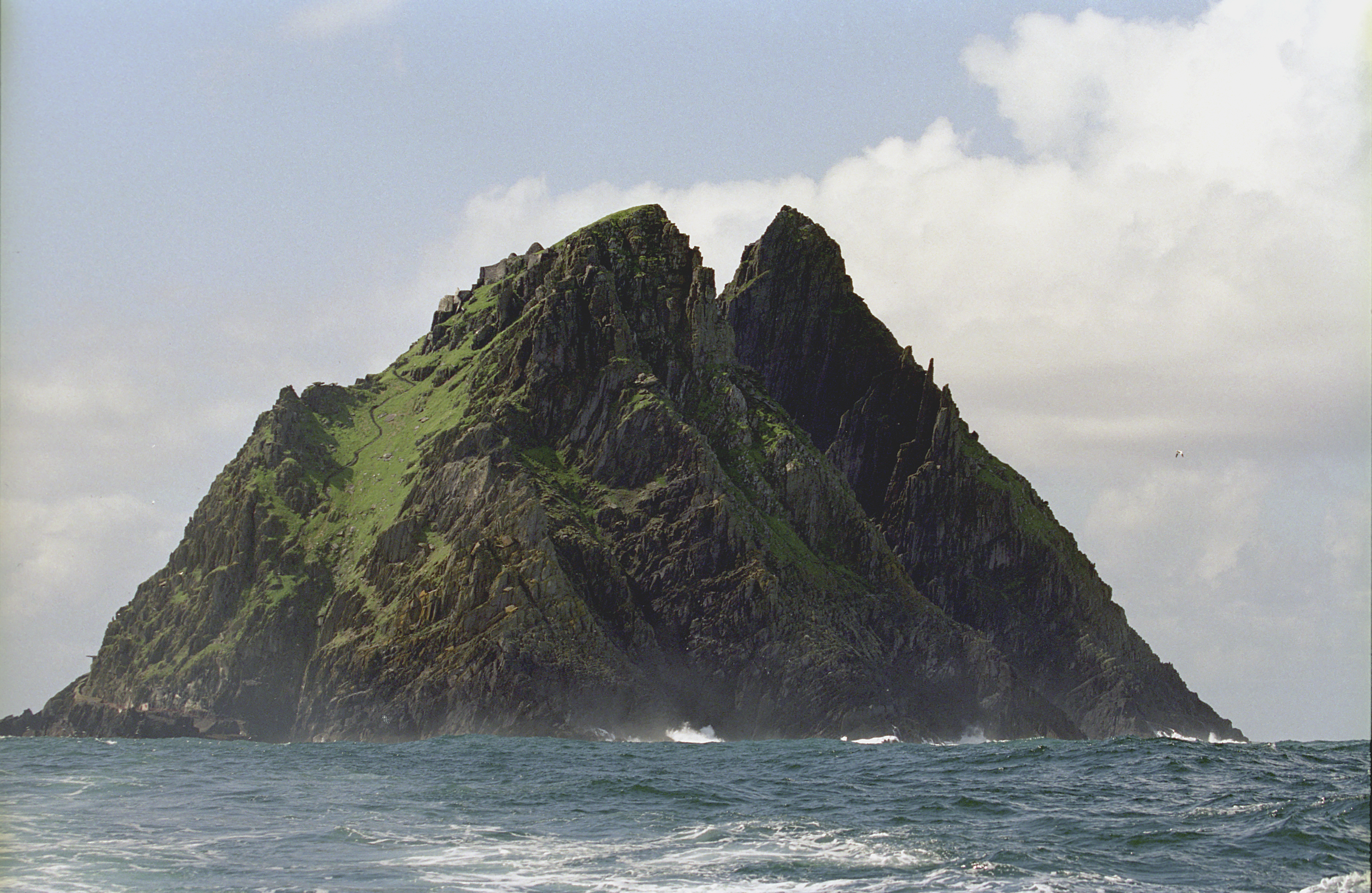
Skellig Michael

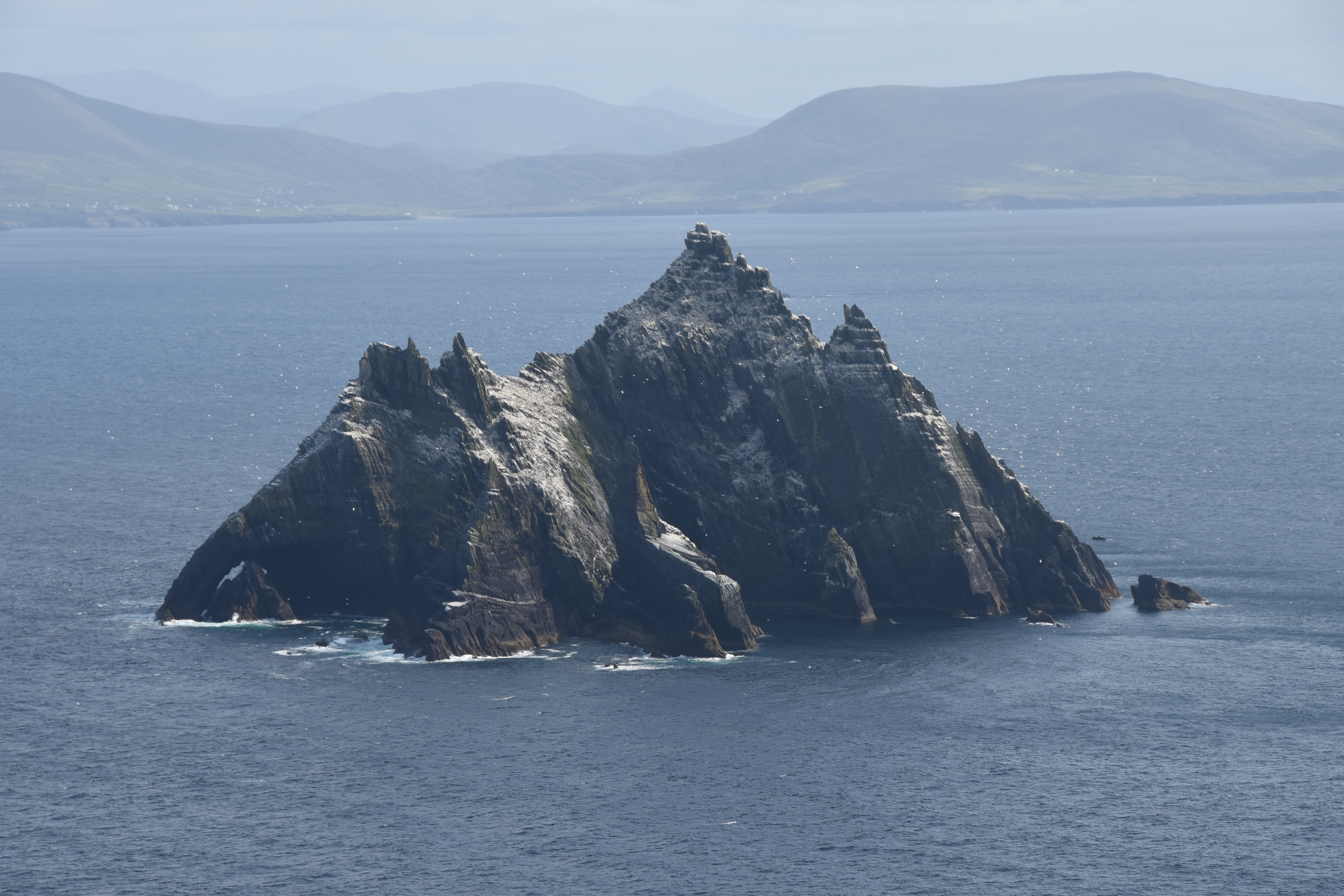
Little Skellig

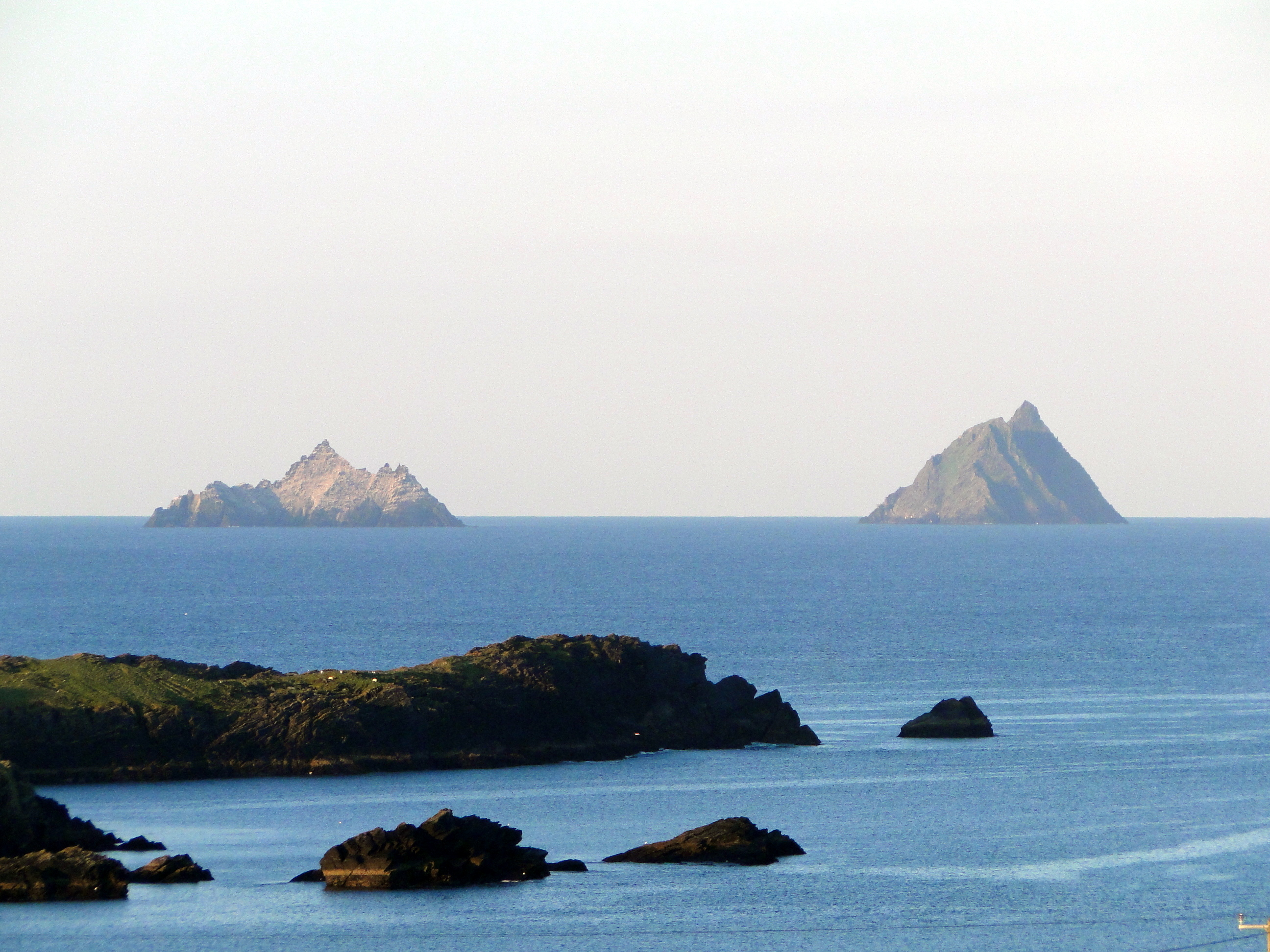
The islands seen from the mainland

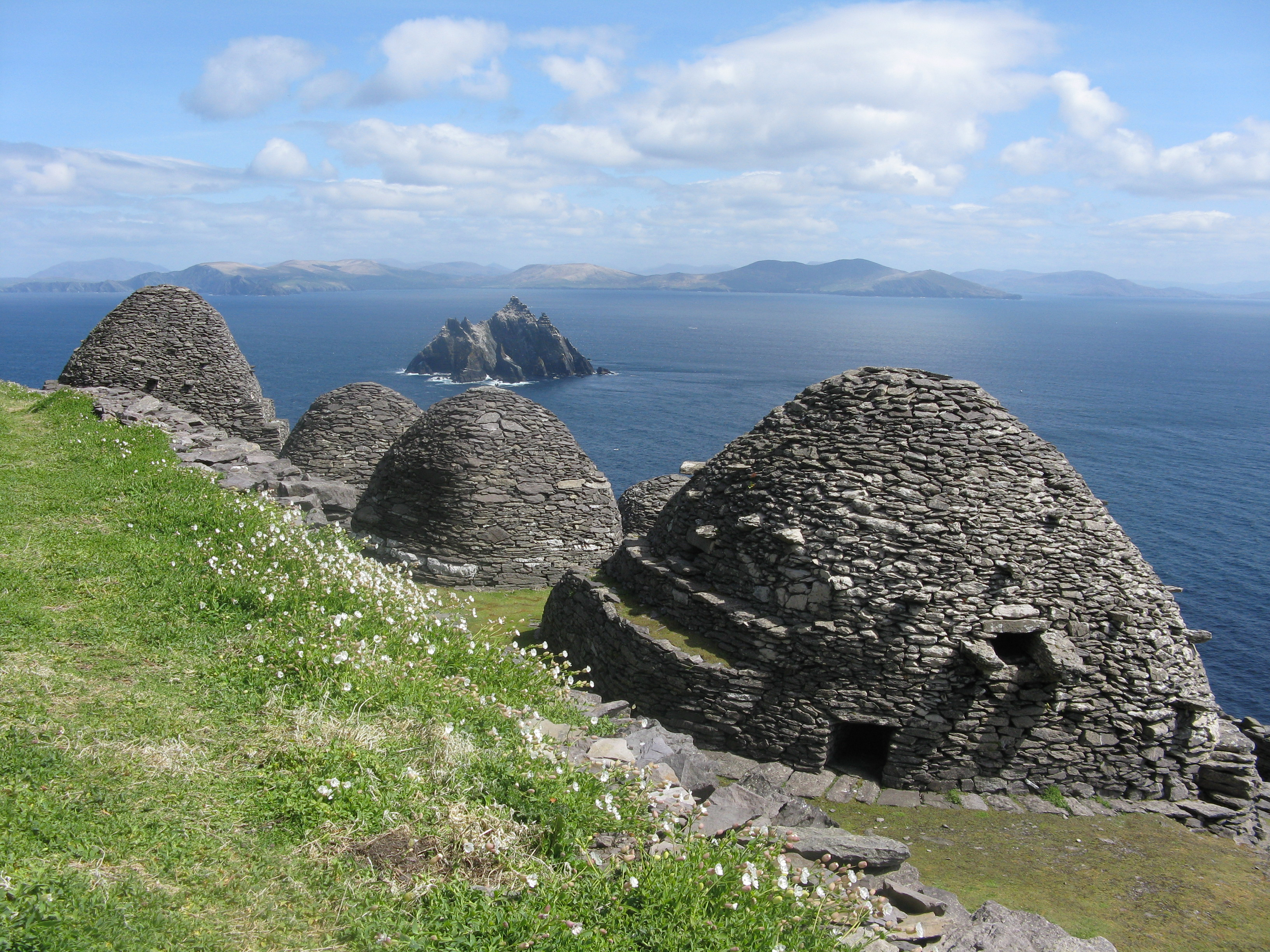
Beehive style huts on Skellig Michael

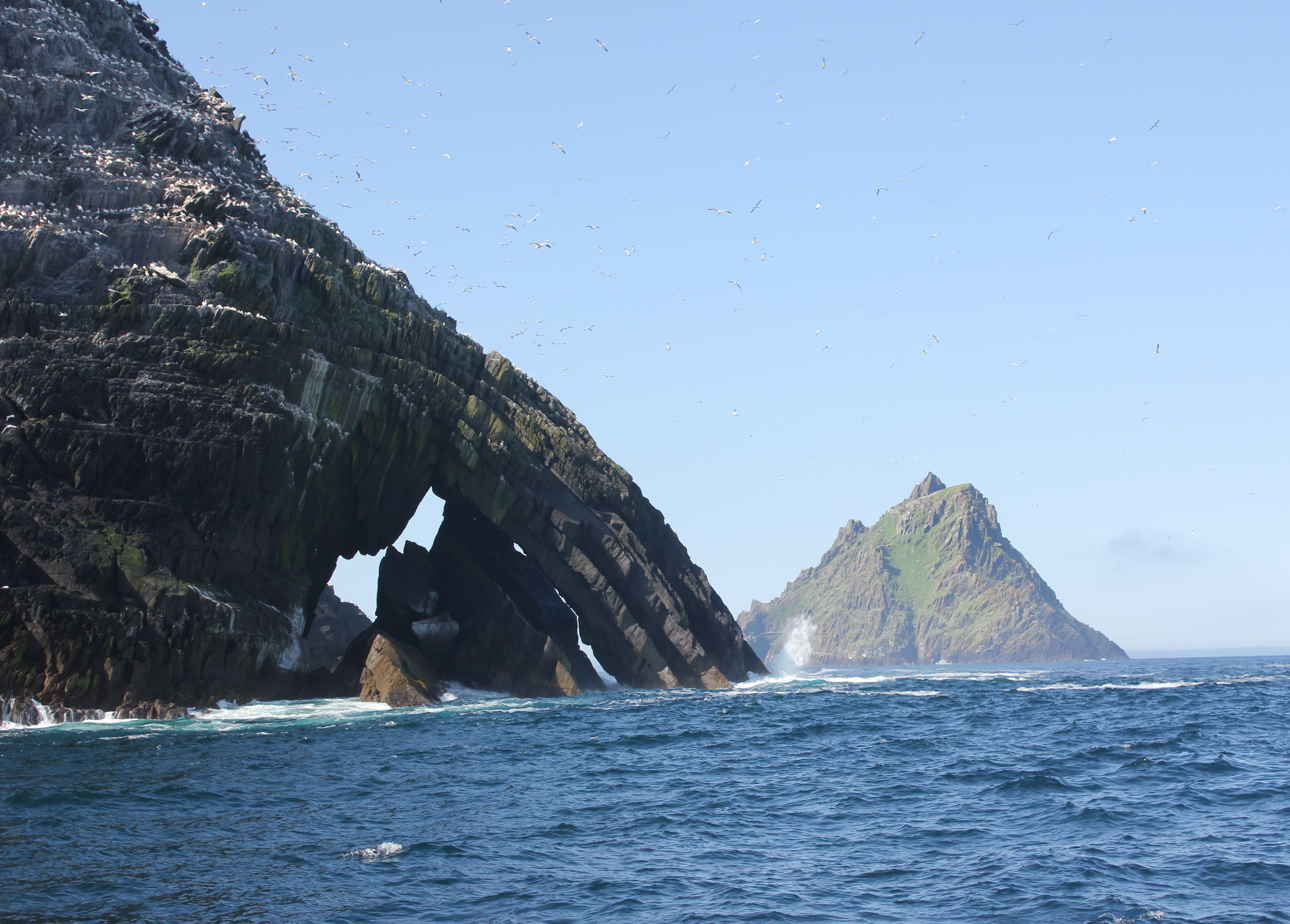
Northern gannet colony on Little Skellig
