= Early tetrapod trackways =

There are several cases of reported trackways of the earliest land-going vertebrates, also known as tetrapods. These trackways provide crucial insights to the study of the transition of aquatic to terrestrial lifestyles in vertebrate evolution. Such fossils help to illuminate not only the timing of this keystone transition of evolutionary history but also what the earliest forms of tetrapod locomotion may have entailed.

== Occurrences ==
=== Holy Cross Mountains, Poland ===
A collection of trackways and impressions is reported from the Wojciechowice Formation of the Holy Cross Mountains located in south-eastern Poland. The Wojciechowice Formation is a shallow marine-fed tidal or lagoonal unit that dates to the Eifelian Stage of the Middle Devonian, approximately 395 million years ago based on conodont fossils and previous biostratigraphy on bounding units. The preservation of the track assemblage varies with some clearer tracks preserving finer morphology such as digitation while others are more vague, preserving only an outline. Showing consistency with the aforementioned tracks, these fall into two parallel rows of impressions and show no evidence of body or tail drag.

=== Valentia Island, Ireland ===
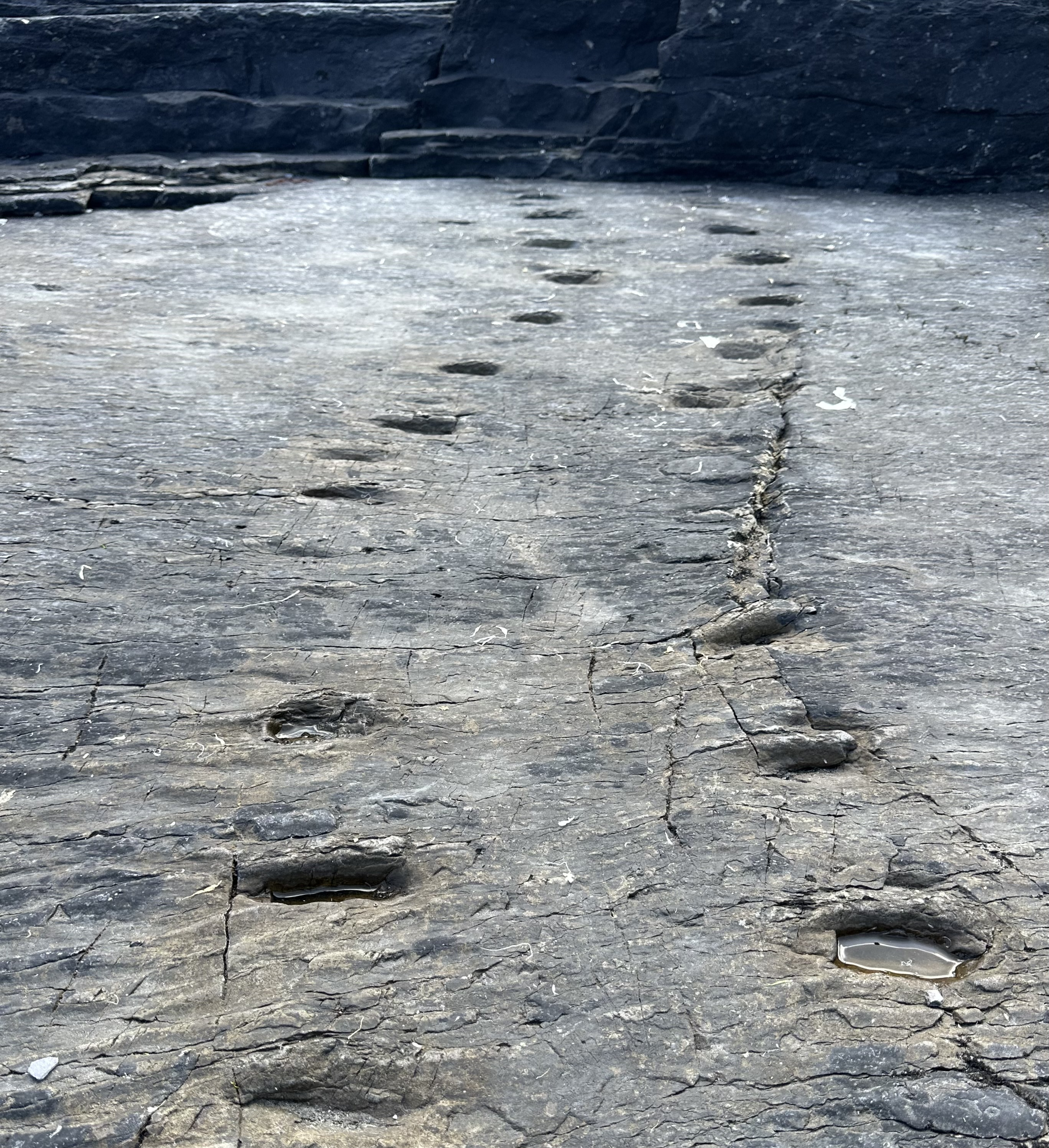
Tetrapod trackways of Valentia Island

Nine tetrapod trackways from three sites have been reported from the Valentia Slate Formation of Valentia Island, Ireland. The Valentia Slate Formation is composed mostly of purple coloured fine-grained sandstones and siltstones interpreted to represent a fluvial setting. The trackways are late Middle Devonian in age based on a palynological assemblage from the Valentia Slate Formation and the U-Pb radioisotopic dating of an interstratified air-fall tuff bed to ca. 385 Ma, making these tetrapod trackways some of the earliest recorded, along with traces of early Middle Devonian (Eifelian) age from Poland. The most extensive of the Valentia Island trackways is preserved in a fine-grained sandstone and records some 145 imprints in a parallel orientation of the left and right impressions. The systematic variation in size of the impressions affords distinction between tracks left by the manus and pes of the animal, but the trackway does not preserve any finer details. Other trackways at the same site preserve tail and body drag impressions; the nature of the impressions and that of the sandstone led to the interpretation that the setting was not saturated in water. Consequently, these tracks are interpreted as evidence of fully terrestrial locomotion.

=== Victoria, Australia ===
A set of three trackways was found within a single sandstone layer of the Genoa River Formation of Victoria, Australia. The Genoa River Formation is a very fine grained purplish-brown non-marine sandstone considered Late Devonian in age based on fern-like plant fossils within the bed and stratigraphic correlation. The tracks preserve four or more impressions each. Each trackway has a roughly parallel structure to the left and right tracks. None of the impressions are reported to include evidence of body dragging, though one includes evidence of tail drag. This is interpreted to illustrate that the movement shown here demonstrates the animal fully suspending its body with its limbs. Additionally, one of the tracks is interpreted to preserve digitation of the limbs, which are reported to possess 5 digits. These trackways then imply that by the Late Devonian a "typical" tetrapod condition had fully evolved.

== Interpretation ==
In addition to these early trackways providing additional evidence of tetrapod activity on land as early as the Devonian, recent work has also been aimed at gleaning biomechanical interpretations from these occurrences.

Typically, it is assumed that the earliest tetrapods had a movement pattern very similar to modern amphibians where the entirety of the pectoral and pelvic girdles would swing as the animal moved forward causing the angular pattern seen in these trackways. Although this movement is quite common in animals such as salamanders, recent work has also been done showing similar patterns created by terrestrially locomoting actinopterygian and sarcopterygian fish. In animals such as the actinopterygian cavefish, the alternating footfalls and general layout of the ancient trackways was readily reproduced. Similarly, modern lungfish, a sarcopterygian fish, were shown to be able to produce somewhat similar trackways through axial flexing rather than limb driven locomotion. These studies do not necessarily disprove that these trackways were in fact produced by tetrapods but do at least muddy the interpretation of these trackways.

Work by Niedźwiedzki et al., particularly analyzing the trackways from Poland, interprets some of the tracks as being dominated by only two limbs. This "ladder-like" pattern produces symmetric trackways that imply that one set of limbs is dominating the motion with the other limbs either not supporting as much weight or not being used at all. Recent biomechanical work on Ichthyostega shows support for this showing that the range of motion in the animal's limbs was not capable of the rotation necessary to support an alternating footfall in the gait. Instead, Icthyostega appears to have moved in a manner more akin to the modern mudskipper, lunging forward by pushing its limbs back and then rotating them back into position. The fact that the alternating footfall gait interpreted from the majority of other tracks is not feasible for Icthyostega implies that there are undiscovered early tetrapods with a different limb and girdle configuration than those of the earliest body fossil remains.
