= Geokaun =

Mountain in Ireland

- an Geocán
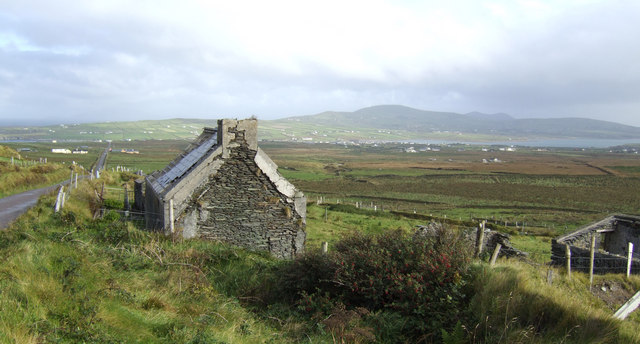
- The mountain (on the right) from Coonanaspig

Highest point
- Elevation: 266 m (873 ft)
- Prominence: 266 m (873 ft)
- Listing: Marilyn
- Coordinates: 51.9227°N 10.3466°W

Naming
- Language of name: Irish

Geography
- Location within island of Ireland
- Location: Valentia Island, County Kerry, Ireland
- OSI/OSNI grid: V386770

Geokaun Mountain (Irish: an Geocán) is the highest mountain on Valentia Island, County Kerry.

== Geography ==
On Geokaun's northern face the 180-metre (600 ft) Fogher Cliffs (Irish: an Fhoithir) meet the sea.

From the summit there are views of the Skellig Islands, Dingle Peninsula, the Blasket Islands, Beginish Island, Cahersiveen, Portmagee and MacGillycuddy's Reeks, including three of Ireland's six highest mountains: Carrauntoohil, Beenkeragh and Caher.

== Access ==
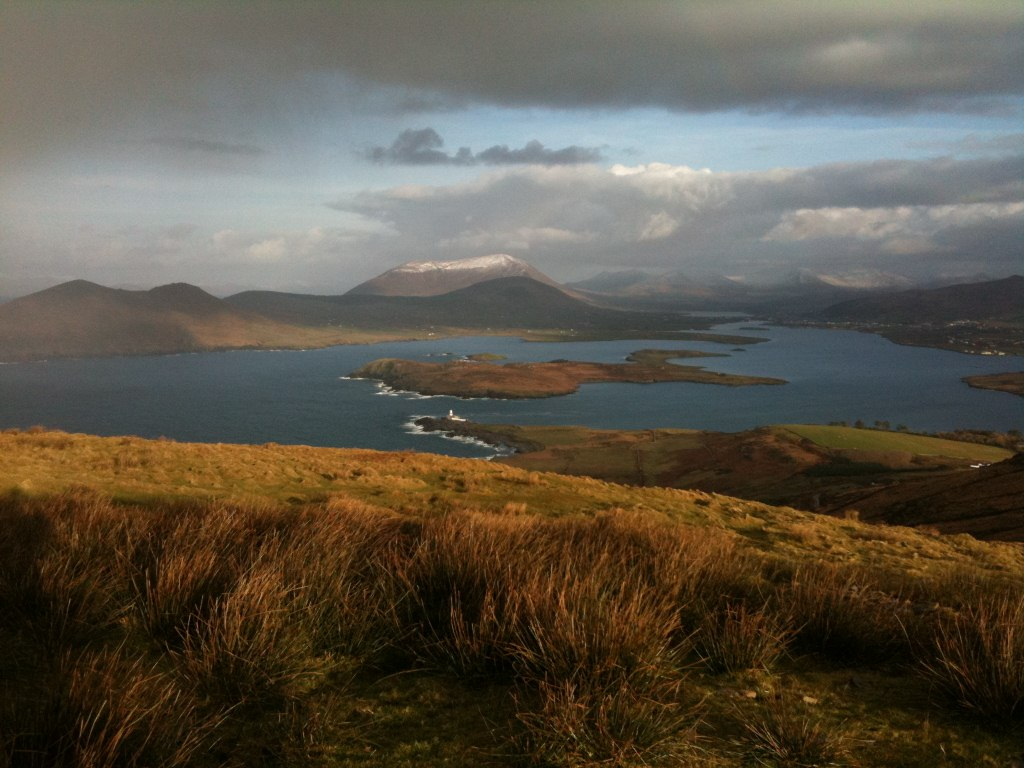
Portion of the view from the summit

The summit of Geokaun Mountain is privately owned, and a fee is required to access the mountain via the main track to the summit.

Situated along the main path up the mountain are 4 viewing areas with 36 information plaques on topics of social, environmental and historical interest in the area. These plaques include information on subjects such as:

- The Skellig Islands
- The first transatlantic telegraph cable
- Bray Tower
- St Brendan's Well
- The Knight of Kerry
- Local birdlife
- Seine fishing
- Valentia Island lighthouse
- The tetrapod trackway

== See also ==
- List of mountains in Ireland
- List of Marilyns in Ireland
