= C9orf85 =

Protein-coding gene in the species Homo sapiens

Identifiers
- Aliases: C9orf85, chromosome 9 open reading frame 85
- External IDs: MGI: 1913456; GeneCards: C9orf85

Gene location (Human)
Chr.	Chromosome 9 (human)
Band	9q21.13	Start	71,911,510 bp
Band	9q21.13	End	71,986,054 bp

Gene location (Mouse)
Chr.	Chromosome 19 (mouse)
Band	19|19 B	Start	21,558,566 bp
Band	19|19 B	End	21,630,340 bp
RNA expression pattern
Bgee	Human / Mouse (ortholog); Top expressed in: pancreatic epithelial cell; amniotic fluid; gingival epithelium; mucosa of paranasal sinus; oral cavity; epithelium of nasopharynx; skin of arm; jejunal mucosa; superficial temporal artery; duodenum / Top expressed in: genital tubercle; tail of embryo; otic placode; saccule; otic vesicle; medial ganglionic eminence; seminal vesicula; zygote; primitive streak; ventricular zone; More reference expression data
BioGPS	n/a
Orthologs
Databases	NCBI: entry; OMA: entry
Species	Human	Mouse
Entrez	138241	66206
Ensembl	ENSG00000155621	ENSMUSG00000035171
UniProt	Q96MD7	Q9CQ90
RefSeq (mRNA)	NM_182505; NM_198394	NM_025423
RefSeq (protein)	NP_872311; NP_001351982; NP_001351984; NP_001351986	NP_079699
Location (UCSC)	Chr 9: 71.91 – 71.99 Mb	Chr 19: 21.56 – 21.63 Mb
PubMed search
- Wikidata
View/Edit Human	View/Edit Mouse

Chromosome 9 open reading frame 85, commonly known as C9orf85, is a protein in Homo sapiens encoded by the C9orf85 gene. The gene is located at 9q21.13. When spliced, four different isoforms are formed. C9orf85 has a predicted molecular weight of 20.17 kdal. Isoelectric point was found to be 9.54. The function of the gene has not yet been confirmed, however it has been found to show high levels of expression in cells of high differentiation.

== Background ==
=== Protein Sequence ===
The sequence for C9orf85 isoform 1 in Homo sapiens, derived from NCBI:

MSSQKGNVARSRPQKHQNTFSFKNDKFDKSVQTKKINAKLHDGVCQRCKEVLEWRVKYSKYKPLSKPKKCVKCLQKTVKDSYHIMCRPCACELEVCAKCGKKEDIVIPWSLPLLPRLECSGRILAHHNLRLPCSSDSPAS ASRVAGTTGAHHHAQLIFVFLVEMGFHYVGQAGLELLTS

=== Aliases ===
- Uncharacterized Protein C9orf85
- MGC61599
- RP11-364E17.2
- LOC138241
- OTTHUMP00000021461

=== Isoforms ===
Table Showcasing the Lengths of all C9orf85 Isoforms
Isoform #	mRNA Length (bp)	Amino Acid Length (aa)
1	3821	179
2	1185	157
3	1316	138
4	3707	69

Isoform 1 is the major form of the gene used. This isoform contains 4 exons. It's accession number is NM_001365053.2.

== Homology ==
=== Orthologs ===
The C9orf85 gene was found in all species type including vertebrate to bacteria. However no type of protist was found as an ortholog for the human gene except for plasmodium.

A List of 20 Orthologs for the gene C9orf85 in Homo sapiens
Genus species	Common name	Taxonomic group	Date of Divergence (MYA)	Accession number	Length (aa)	Identity	Similarity
Homo sapiens	Human	Chordata	0	NP_001351982	179	100%	100%
Meriones unguiculatus	Mongolian gerbil	Rodentia	90	XP_021514638	154	74%	84%
Gallus gallus	Chicken	Chordata	312	XP_001233821	166	78.70%	60%
Terrapene carolina triunguis	Three-toed box turtle	Chordata	312	XP_024066792	171	85.45%	61%
Chelonia mydas	Green sea turtle	Chordata	312	XP_007065676	178	84.31%	61%
Calidris pugnax	Ruff bird	Chordata	312	XP_014813985	166	77.78%	60%
Microcaecilia unicolor	Tiny cayenne caecilian	Chordata	351.8	XP_030049723	178	76.15%	60%
Xenopus tropicalis	Western clawed frog	Chordata	351.8	KAE8633085	133	78.18%	61%
Electrophorus electricus	Electric eel	Chordata	435	XP_026886158	156	55.13%	87%
Oncorhynchus mykiss	Rainbow trout	Chordata	435	XP_021461156	177	60.77%	72%
Acanthaster planci	Crown-of-thorns starfish	Echinodermata	684	XP_022096254	197	56.76%	62%
Photinus pyralis	Big dipper firefly	Arthropoda	797	XP_031346726	183	58.04%	62%
Pomacea canaliculata	Golden apple snail	Mollusca	797	XP_025077101	208	47.33%	73%
Drosophila melanogaster	Fruit Fly	Arthropoda	797	NP_573209	234	49.58%	65%
Acropora millepora	Coral	Cnidaria	824	XP_029187517	190	57.14%	62%
Salpingoeca rosetta	Choanoflagellate	Choanoflagellate	1023	XP_004995700	286	41.67%	60%
Apophysomyces ossiformis	Fungi	Mucoromycota	1105	KAF7725139	181	40%	72%
Ricinus communis	Caster oil plant	Spermatophyta	1496	XP_002530997	227	34.21%	78%
Plasmodium ovale wallikeri	Malarian protist	Apicomplexa	1768	SBT56954	680	68.75%	17%
Bacillus cereus	Bacteria	Firmicutes	4290	KXI72539	83	73.61%	39%

=== Paralogs ===
5 Possible Paralogs for the gene C9orf85 in Homo sapiens
Paralog	Accession number	Length (aa)	Identity	Similarity	Location
CCDC198	XP_005267863	290	44.38%	89%	Chromosome 14
Retbidin	EAW84316	224	60%	51%	Chromosome 19
hCG2038446	EAX11460	135	68.54%	49%	Chromosome 2
hCG1820974	EAW94215	143	72.58%	41%	Chromosome 17
O-phosphoseryl-tRNA(Sec) selenium transferase isoform X1	XP_016863766	586	70.67%	41%	Chromosome 4

=== Rate of Molecular Evolution ===
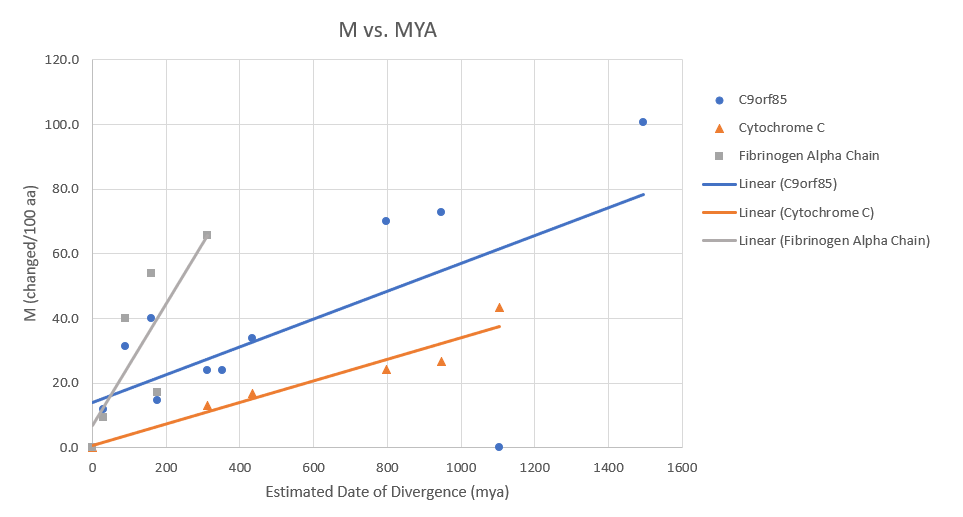
A graph depicting the rate of divergence for the human gene C9orf85 in comparison to Homo sapiens Cytochrome C and Fibrinogen Alpha Chain.

A rate of divergence can be calculated using the molecular clock hypothesis. As observed by the graph, C9orf85 lies between Cytochrome C and Fibrinogen Alpha with a slope leaning more towards Cytochrome C. Therefore, C9orf85 is possibly evolving at a slower rate than most proteins.

== Conservation ==
=== Multiple Sequence Alignment ===
A multiple sequence alignment (MSA) was done between the top 15 closely related orthologs to the Homo sapiens C9orf85. 20 amino acids were discovered to be conserved among all 15 sequences at the beginning of the protein sequence; within the first three exons.

In a MSA between distantly related homologs, 5 amino acids were observed to be conserved between exons two and three.

Yet, when running a multiple sequence alignment between Homo sapiens and the extremely distant Bacillus cereus, 53 amino acids are observed to be conserved primarily in the fourth exon.

=== Cysteine ===
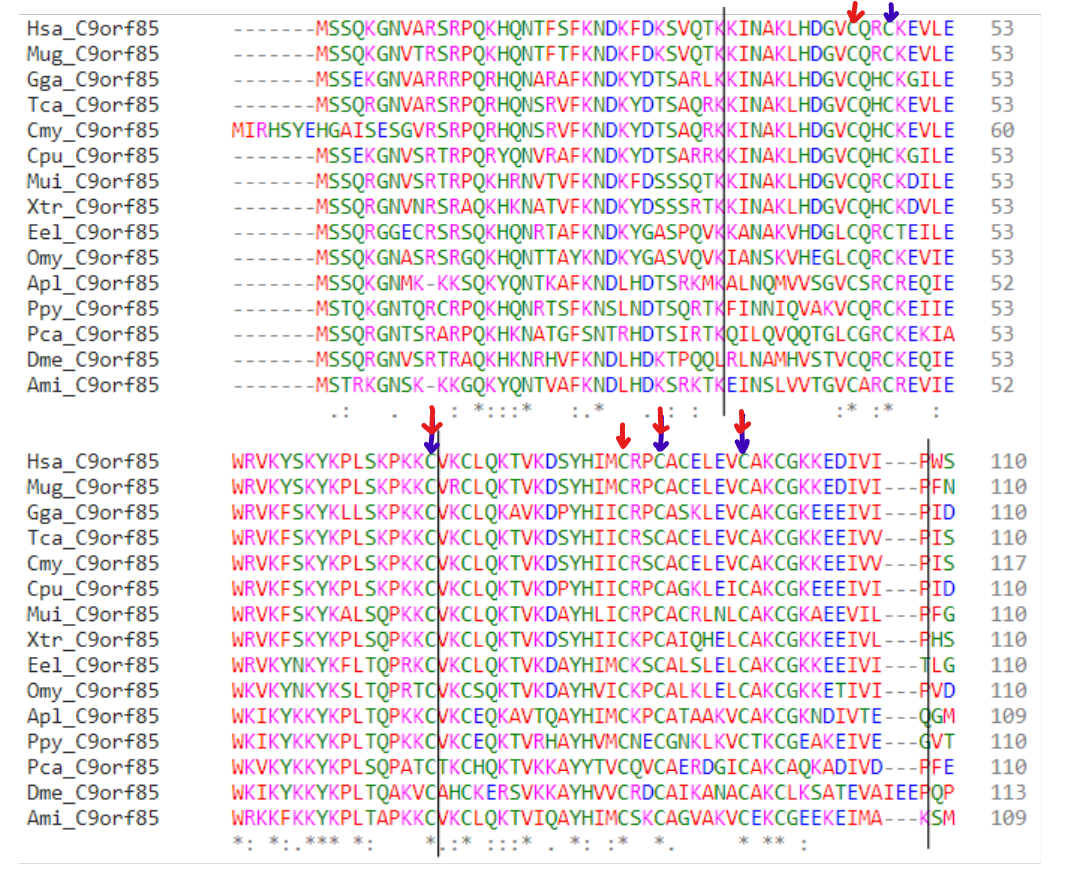
Multiple sequence alignment of C9orf85 showcasing the most significant & conserved cysteines.

The amino acid cysteine appears the most throughout the protein sequence as a conserved amino acids; 8 out of 20 instances. Cysteine 48, 70, 89, 96, and Tryptophan 54 are amino acids conserved in all species type – including vertebrate, invertebrate, fungi, plants, and protists – besides bacteria.

Using the Statistical Analysis of Protein Sequences tool, SAPS, 5 spacings of cysteine were found. Four with the pattern of C-X-X-C—at amino acids 45, 70, 86, and 96—and the fifth spacing at amino acid 89 (CAC). The C-X-X-C pattern is known to be present in metal-binding proteins and oxidoreductases. Additionally, three of the five cysteine spacings were also the top conserved amino acids throughout the most closely related orthologs; C70, C89, and C96.

== Localization ==
=== Gene Localization in Humans ===
C9orf85 has been found to be expressed highly in epithelial cells. of the pancreas. Additionally, high levels of expression have been established in the urinary bladder and thymus of the adult human, while expression levels were significant in the intestine of a 20-week-old fetus.

=== Subcellular Localization ===
k-NN results predict C9orf85 to be 78.3% nuclear, 8.7% mitochondrial, 8.7% cytoplasmic, and 4.3% vacuolar.

== Promoter ==
C9orf85 has 3 predicted promoters for the gene. The choice promoter was GXG_18858 on the plus strand. Chosen for its large quantity of CAGE tags and its position being furthest upstream. Its start position is 71909780 and its end position is 71911841. It includes 2062 base pairs and has 13 transcripts. The last 500 base pairs of the double stranded promoter is featured below:

5' GCAGGAGGCGGGGATTGCGGAAAAGAAGAACCAATAGGAACAAAGGTTCC 3'
3' CGTCCTCCGCCCCTAACGCCTTTTCTTCTTGGTTATCCTTGTTTCCAAGG 5'

5' CCGCCCCTTTGATTTGATGGACTACACATTCGGGCCAATGGGGGAATTCT 3'
3' GGCGGGGAAACTAAACTACCTGATGTGTAAGCCCGGTTACCCCCTTAAGA 5'

5' CATTTCGAAGAAAGTGGGACTTGTTCTCCGGGTTTGAGAAAGAGGCTGCG 3'
3' GTAAAGCTTCTTTCACCCTGAACAAGAGGCCCAAACTCTTTCTCCGACGC 5'

5' CGGAGCCGGAGGGGTCGAGGCTGCGCCGCGTGGAGTGGCTTGGCTTAACA 3'
3' GCCTCGGCCTCCCCAGCTCCGACGCGGCGCACCTCACCGAACCGAATTGT 5'

5' GCAGGGAGGGCAGAGCGATGCTCTTTGACCTCCCAGAAGAGTCACGTGGG 3'
3' CGTCCCTCCCGTCTCGCTACGAGAAACTGGAGGGTCTTCTCAGTGCACCC 5'

5' CTGACCCAGAGCCGGGGCGGAAAGGCTGCGTTTGTTTCTTCCGGGTCATT 3'
3' GACTGGGTCTCGGCCCCGCCTTTCCGACGCAAACAAAGAAGGCCCAGTAA 5'

5' GACAGAAGCGTCAATTCCTGGGAGTAGTTCGTTGGTTTTCTTTCCCCTCA 3'
3' CTGTCTTCGCAGTTAAGGACCCTCATCAAGCAACCAAAAGAAAGGGGAGT 5'

5' TCCTTTTGCCTGCTCCCGGCGAGGGGTGGCTTTGATTTCGGCGATGAGCT 3'
3' AGGAAAACGGACGAGGGCCGCTCCCCACCGAAACTAAAGCCGCTACTCGA 5'

5' CCCAGAAAGGCAACGTGGCTCGTTCCAGACCTCAGAAGCACCAGAATACG 3'
3' GGGTCTTTCCGTTGCACCGAGCAAGGTCTGGAGTCTTCGTGGTCTTATGC 5'

5' TTTAGCTTCAAAAATGACAAGTTCGATAAAAGTGTGCAGACCAAGGTAGG 3'
3' AAATCGAAGTTTTTACTGTTCAAGCTATTTTCACACGTCTGGTTCCATCC 5'

A Table of 16 Possible Transcription Factors Predicted to Bind to the Promoter
Transcription factor	Detailed matrix information	Matrix Score
CLOX	Transcriptional repressor CDP	0.962
KLFS	Gut-enriched Krueppel-like factor	1.000
CAAT	Nuclear factor Y (Y-box binding factor)	0.940
HIFF	Aryl hydrocarbon receptor nuclear translocator-like, homodimer	1.000
MZF1	Myeloid zinc finger protein	0.992
STAT	STAT5: signal transducer and activator of transcription 5	0.944
ETSF	ETS-like gene 1 (ELK-1)	0.958
CREB	Tax/CREB complex	0.834
P53F	Tumor suppressor p53 (3' half site)	0.921
TCFF	TCF11/LCP-F1/Nrf1 homodimers	1.000
FKHD	Fork head homologous X binds DNA with a dual sequence specificity (FHXA and FHXB)	0.870
MIRF	Zinc finger protein 768	0.819
BCL6	B-cell CLL/lymphoma 6, member B (BCL6B)	0.878
AP2F	Transcription factor AP-2, alpha	0.931
EBOX	MYC associated factor X	0.926
GCMF	Glial cells missing homolog 1, chorion-specific transcription factor GCMa	0.942

== Regulation ==
=== Transmembrane Domain ===
Though there is a presence of hydrophobic regions in the protein sequence, there have been no confirmed transmembrane domains present

=== Phosphorylation ===
A protein kinase C phosphorylation site is predicted at amino acid 3-5. There is also a possible CK2 phosphorylation site at amino acid 77-80

=== SUMOylating ===
There is one predicted SUMO site at position 23. The result is significant with a p-value of 0.041.

== Function ==
Through the level of expression in various tissue samples, the C9orf85 protein is a regulated gene rather than a constitutive gene.

Additionally, urinary bladder epithelial cells function by altering the immune system of an infection. The thymus is a primary lymphoid organ of the immune system, composed of T cells and epithelial cells. Research has found that the thymus has an increasing role in the development of intestinal immunity Both are an element of the immune system, designed to ensure proper function of the immune system.
