= Skeletal changes of vertebrates transitioning from water to land =

As tetrapodomorph vertebrates began colonizing land during the Late Devonian and Early Carboniferous, their bodies began evolving anatomical traits better adapted for life away from water. Skeletal innovations conventionally associated with terrestrially first appeared in aquatic elpistostegalians such as Panderichthys rhombolepis, Elpistostege watsoni, and Tiktaalik roseae. Phylogenetic analyses distribute the features that developed along the tetrapod stem and display a stepwise process of character acquisition, rather than abrupt. The complete transition occurred over a period of 30 million years beginning with the tetrapodomorph diversification in the Middle Devonian (380 myr).

By the Upper Devonian period, the fin-limb transition as well as other skeletal changes such as gill arch reduction, opercular series loss, mid-line fin loss, and scale reduction were already completed in many aquatic organisms. As aquatic tetrapods began their transition to land, several skeletal changes are thought to have occurred to allow for movement and respiration on land. Some adaptations required to adjust to non-aquatic life include the movement and use of alternating limbs, the use of pelvic appendages as sturdy propulsors, and the use of a solid surface at the organism's base to generate propulsive force required for walking.

== Head ==
=== Head changes in Osteichthyes ===
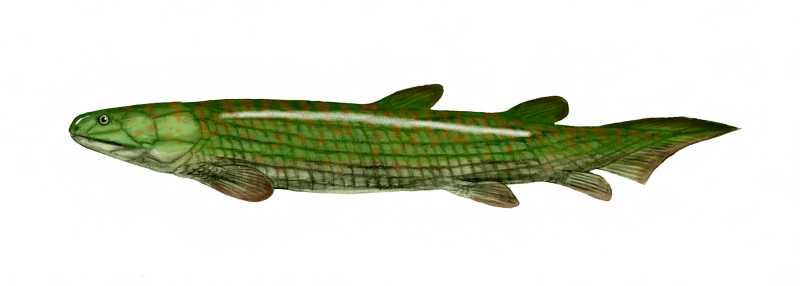
Restoration of Osteolepis

The Osteolepiformes and Elpistostegalia are two crown groups of rhipidistians with respect to the tetrapods. The development of skull roof and cheekbone patterns in these organisms match those found in the first tetrapods. Palatal and nasal skeletal features like choanae are present in these groups and are also observed in modern amphibians. This indicates that incipient air breathing was developed, as well as modification of the hyoid arch towards stapes development. These characteristics account for why osteichthyans are accepted as the sister group of tetrapods.

The elpistostegalid fish are considered the most apomorphic of fish in comparison to tetrapods. From well-preserved fossils, it is observed that they share a paltybasic skull with eye ridges, and external nares situated on the margin of the mouth. Development of eye ridges and flatting of the skull are also observed in primitive fossil amphibians and reptiles. The most likely reason for the traits to be adaptive was for their use in aerial vision above the waterline. The traits enabled animals to check area on land for safe spots if being chased by a predator in water, as well as being useful for searching for prey items above the water. The water-based lateral line system was used substantially by these aquatic tetrapods to detect danger from predators. Within the Osteichthyan diversification, there were no changes related to respiration in the transition as can be seen by the nasal region and palatal morphology in elpistostegalid fishes. The primary change from basic ostelepiform ancestors to the first elpistostegalid in the middle Devonian was to the pre-existing roof skulls.

=== Head changes in prototetrapod ===
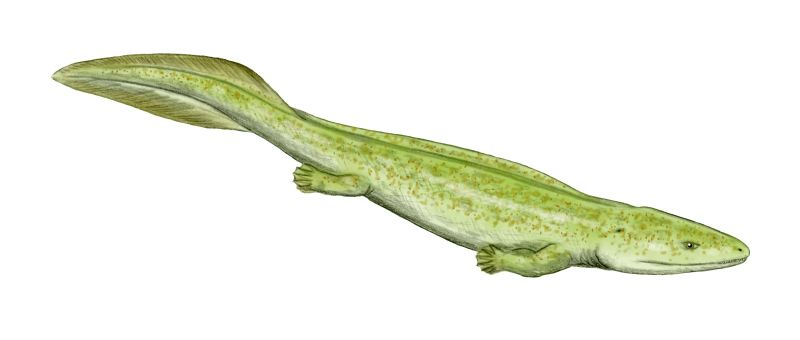
Restoration of Elginerpeton

In Elginerpeton pancheni, a prototetrapod from the late Frasnian, basic tetrapod characteristics in the lower jaw and the cranium are observed. The taxon is believed to fill the gap between elpistostegalid fishes and well-preserved Devonian tetrapods. The Elginerpeton is considered more derived than the elpistostegalid fishes due to presence of paired fangs on the parasymphysial toothplate, a slender shaped anterior coronoid, and in the loss of the intracranial joint and coronoid fossa. The loss of the intercranial joint was a direct functional necessity to strengthen the broad and long platybasic skull when the animal was out of the water. The tubular lower jaw of the Elginerpeton, compared to the flat-lamina jaw shape of fishes gave it superior cross-sectional force, required when not supported in an aquatic setting – allowing for opening of the mouth outside of water. The adaptation may also be interpreted as a specialization for buccopharyngeal breathing. It is speculated to be the first step towards aerial respiration in the transition from fish to tetrapod.

=== Head changes in aquatic tetrapods ===
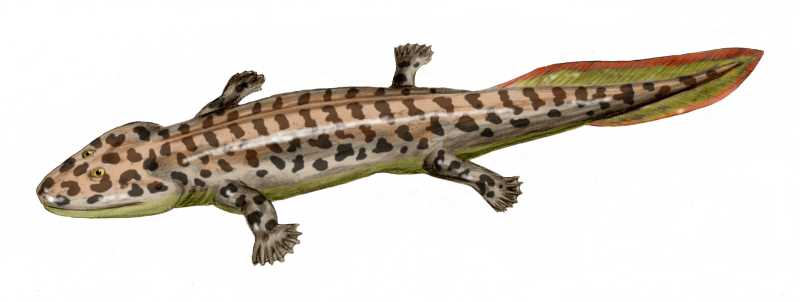
Restoration of Acanthostega

In the tetrapod and higher clades from the lower-middle Famennian there are several defining changes on the basis of anatomy of Ichthyostega, Tulerpeton, and Acanthostega. In the cranium, there is a stapes derived from the hyomandibular of fishes; a single bilateral pair of nasal bones, and a fenestra ovalis in the otic capsule of the braincase. The opening of the otic wall of the braincase can be considered a paedomorphic feature for tetrapods and is linked to the stapes functionally. The stapes was thought to be just a structural support between the palate and the stapedial plate of the braincase. In the Acanthostega, it is likely that due to the otic capsule of the brain case being mesial to the stapedial plate, sound was picked up from the palate or the otic notch to allow for rudimentary hearing. It was able to perceive vibrations by opening its mouth by way of the palate. Other factors that caused aquatic tetrapods to spend more time on land caused the development of terrestrial hearing with the development of a tympanum within an otic notch and developed by convergent evolution at least three times. There was also a change in the dermal bones of the skull in the aquatic tetrapods. It involved the enlargement of the jugal, ceasing the contact of the maxilla with the squamosal and the single bilateral pair of nasal bones. The feature allows for a stronger bite as well as increasing the strength of the skull.

=== Teeth and feeding mechanisms ===
Feeding on land is a completely different task than feeding in water. Water is much more dense and viscous compared to air, causing hunting techniques adapted in water to be less successful when applied on land. The main technique used in water is suction feeding and is used by most aquatic vertebrates. This technique does not function in air so animals use methods of overtaking prey with jaws followed by biting down. Transitional forms prior to fully developed terrestrial tetrapods such as Acanthostega, are thought to have captured prey in the water. Large coronoid fangs are present in the fishes Eusthenopteron, Panderichthys, and Tiktaalik, and the early tetrapod, Ventasega. In Acanthostega, which is more derived, the large teeth are absent. In Eusthenopetron and Panderichthys, an ossified operculum is exhibited unlike in the Tiktaalik, Ventastega, and Acanthostega. These differences as well as reductions of the gill chamber and changes in the nature of the lower jaw are hypothesized to indicate a reduced reliance on suction feeding in early tetrapods in comparison to osteolepiform fish. This morphological data is not enough however to prove that suction feeding was less used as the morphological changes have been found in fish that use the suction feeding mechanism.

Cranial sutures are indicators of skull function and morphologies can be linked to specific feeding modes. Transitional feeding changes can be observed by examining cross sectional morphology of a suture in taxa of the fish-tetrapod transition. Comparing positionally comparable sutures in extant fish allows for the creation of a sutural morphospace. The main cause of sutural deformation is caused by strain during feeding activity, most prominent with feeding mechanisms involving sucking a prey into the mouth. There is a tension anteriorly, and compression posteriorly strain patterns are observed in Polypterus, a prey-sucking predator. In terrestrial tetrapod Phonerpeton, there is compression between the frontals and parietals and a complex loading between the post parietals. There is no evidence of tensile strain in any sutures. Acanthostega fossil records demonstrate that no strain pattern was exhibited that relate to prey capture by means of suction. The load compression is similar to extant tetrapods. It is most likely that the organism captured prey by biting in the water or near the edge of the water. This finding indicates that the terrestrial mode of feeding first emerged in an aquatic environment. Since tongues are only found in tetrapods, it is assumed that they evolved as a result of the more gravity-bound environment of the land, which requires an extra force of muscles to drive the food inside, from the exaptation of gill muscles, specifically the ventral ones (see hypobranchial eminence and pharyngeal arches).

== Neck ==
The cranial endoskeleton of T. roseae shares derived features with tetrapods. There was a loss of opercular and extrascapular elements, enhancing head mobility in T. roseae compared to other tetrapodomorph fish. The formation of the neck allowed for locomotion in shallow waters. This environment allows for less motility compared to the three-dimensional space that fish are able to orient themselves in. The body of the organism in these environments would be fixed in the shallow pools with appendages planted on a substrate.

In the Acanthostega and Ichthyostega, which are considered to be more derived than other basal aquatic tetrapods, the pectoral girdle is decoupled from the skull. There is also a loss of the dorsal pectoral girdle bones, which permits a large degree of movement for the shoulder. This allows for a greater degree of movement, and is a necessity for improving aquatic maneuvers and terrestrial locomotion. This could have been driven by the need to lift the head to aid aerial respiration by using nostrils and choanae.

== Limbs ==
Limbs in vertebrates are occasionally organized into stylopod (relating to the humerus and femur), zeugopod (relating to the radius and tibia, along with associated structures) and autopod (relating to digits) categories, although anatomically, the evolutionary differences between these groups in early tetrapods tends to be vague.

The transition from fins to limbs occurred once an endoskeleton entered the base of the fin, as seen in today's lungfish. This is thought to have originated in the group Sarcopterygians, including osteolipiforms like Eusthenopteron, due to the homology of the tetrapod forelimb and the osteolepiform fin endoskeleton.

Acanthostega is a partially aquatic tetrapod with developed limbs that shares features common with the earlier tetrapods, Panderichthys and Eusthenopteron. Like Panderichthys, the humerus of Acanthostega is flattened dorso-ventrally, the intermedium terminates level with the radius, and the endoskeleton can be divided into stylopodium, zeugopodium and autopodium segments. Similar to Eusthenopteron, the radials do not articulate with the radius on the distal end. Acanthostega also has a 1:2 ratio of humerus to radius and ulna, a feature seen in all tetrapods higher than Acanthostega on the phylogeny.

Unlike Panderichthys, Acanthostega hind limbs are at least the size of its fore limbs, if not larger. This development of larger limbs is required to physically support the organism during emergence from an aquatic setting to land. The humerus and femur of Acanthostega also contain evidence of greater development of the appendicular muscles compared to more aquatic tetrapods, hinting at the presence of digits.

Similarly, Ossinodus has two hindlimbs located bilaterally and proximodistally asymmetrical. Due to the presence of a small femur during juvenile development, this Carboniferous- period tetrapod is thought to be aquatic during juvenile development; only emerging onto land once it reaches adulthood. Ossinodus also has a broad, flat tibia, akin to Acanthostega, and is thought to be only partially terrestrial.

== Pelvis ==
The development of the pelvic region was crucial for the adaptation from water to land, yet some features of tetrapod locomotion are thought to have arisen before the origin of digited limbs or the transition from water to land. The fossil record of early tetrapods shows evidence of distinct pelvic development occurring in osteolepiforms, further supporting osteolepiform ancestry of terrestrial tetrapods.

Acanthostega has a large pelvis, with the iliac region articulating with the axial skeleton and a broad ischial plate. It has a sacrum; a fundamental skeletal feature that allows the organism to transfer force produced in its hindlimbs to its axial skeleton, and move in a terrestrial environment. A pubo-ischiadic symphysis is also observed, uniting the two pelvic halves.

In contrast, Protopterus annectens (a member of lungfish, thought to be a sister group to tetrapods) has a small, anatomically simpler pelvis, a derived limb endoskeleton and a lack of digits. Yet, it shares the ability to lift itself using a solid surface as a base with its pelvic region with Acanthostega and is also observed to move with tetrapod-like locomotion in an aquatic environment. This illustrates that a fundamental innovation in tetrapods is also found in a lower, sister taxon, in which members lack a sacrum.

== Digits and limb joints ==
Acanthostega is the earliest example of a digitized tetrapod. The humerus and femur of Acanthostega contain evidence of greater development of the appendicular muscles compared to more aquatic tetrapods. Acanthostega has a total lack of dermal fin rays and displays the presence of two or more spool-shaped bones or cartilages articulating individually in antero-posterial sets on the distal end of its limbs. This feature can now be distinguished as digits instead of the endoskeletal radials seen in earlier tetrapods.

Pederpes, a tetrapod from the Early Carboniferous period, also has hindlimbs containing five digits that are rotated to face anteriorly. Unlike previous tetrapods, who have been only partially adapted to land, Pederpes has the novel ability to bend its limbs and propel itself forwards in a terrestrial setting. This is attributed to the symmetry of the digits and limbs in Pederpes, allowing it to rotate its hindlimbs to an anteriorly facing position and propel itself from the edge of the foot when moving forward. This morphological development of bendable wrists and ankles can distinguish Pederpes as the first true terrestrial tetrapod.
