= Secondarily aquatic tetrapods =

Several clades of tetrapods have undergone secondary aquatic adaptation, an evolutionary transition from being purely terrestrial to living at least partly aquatic. These animals are called "secondarily aquatic" because although all tetrapods descended from freshwater lobe finned fish (see evolution of tetrapods), their more recent ancestors are terrestrial vertebrates that evolved on land for hundreds of millions of years, and their clades only re-adapted to aquatic environment much later.

Unlike primarily aquatic vertebrates (i.e. fish), secondarily aquatic tetrapods (especially aquatic amniotes), while having appendages such as flippers, dorsal fin and tail fins (flukes) that resemble fish fins due to convergent evolution, still have physiology based on their terrestrial ancestry, most notably their air-breathing respiration via lungs (instead of aquatic respiration via gills) and excretion of nitrogenous waste as urea or uric acid (instead of ammonia like most fish). Nearly all extant aquatic tetrapods are secondarily aquatic, with only larval amphibians (tadpoles) being primarily aquatic with gills, and only some species of paedomorphic mole salamanders (most notably the fully aquatic axolotl) retain the gill-based larval physiology into adulthood.

Secondary aquatic adaptations of tetrapods tend to develop in early speciation of semi-aquatic animals that venture more and more frequently into water bodies in search of suitable habitats and foraging/hunting for food. As successive generations spend more time in water, natural selection favors those with traits that fare better in water, hence leading to more specialized aquatic adaptations via convergent evolution that make them become more fish-like in morphology. Later-generation aquatic tetrapods may evolve to spend most their life in the water, only coming ashore for mating, sleeping or to evade aquatic predators. Finally, some aquatic tetrapods become ultra-specialized aquatic animals who are fully adapted to sleep (while holding breath) and reproduce in water, with some even losing the ability to breathe and stay alive if stranded out of water.

== Marine reptiles ==
=== Mesosaurs ===
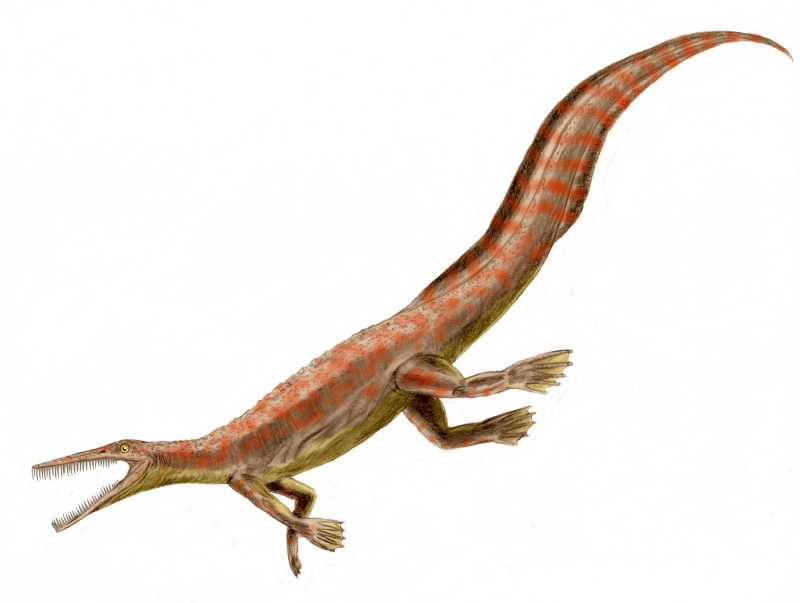
Restoration of a Mesosaurus, the earliest group of aquatic reptiles.

Mesosaurs were a group of small aquatic reptiles that lived during the early Permian period (Cisuralian), roughly 299 to 270 million years ago. Mesosaurs were the first known aquatic reptiles, having returned to an aquatic lifestyle from more terrestrial ancestors. Most authors consider mesosaurs to have been fully aquatic, although adult animals may have been only semiaquatic.

=== Turtles ===
Archelon is a type of giant sea turtle dating from the Cretaceous Period, now long extinct. Its smaller cousins survive as the sea turtles of today.

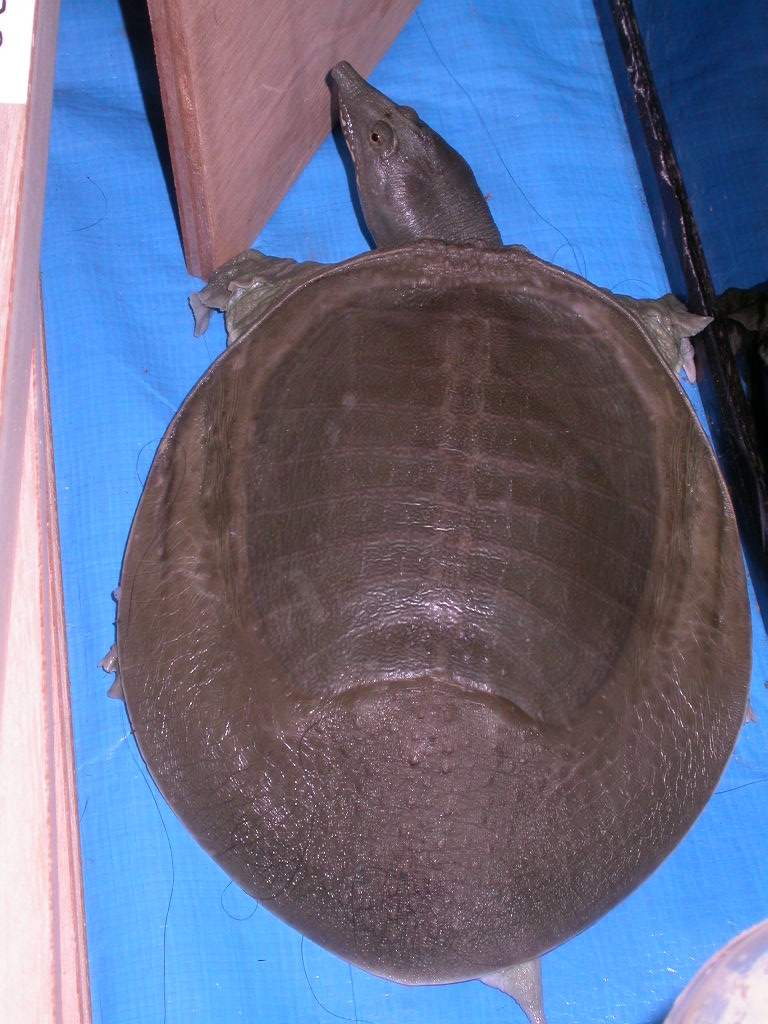
Chinese softshell turtle

Softshell turtles are a taxonomic family of a number of turtle genera that are able to "breathe" underwater with rhythmic movements of their mouth cavity, which contains numerous processes copiously supplied with blood, acting similarly to gill filaments in fish. This enables them to stay under water for prolonged periods. Moreover, the Chinese softshell turtle has been shown to excrete urea while "breathing" underwater; this is an efficient solution when the animal does not have access to fresh water, e.g., in brackish-water environments.

=== Squamates ===
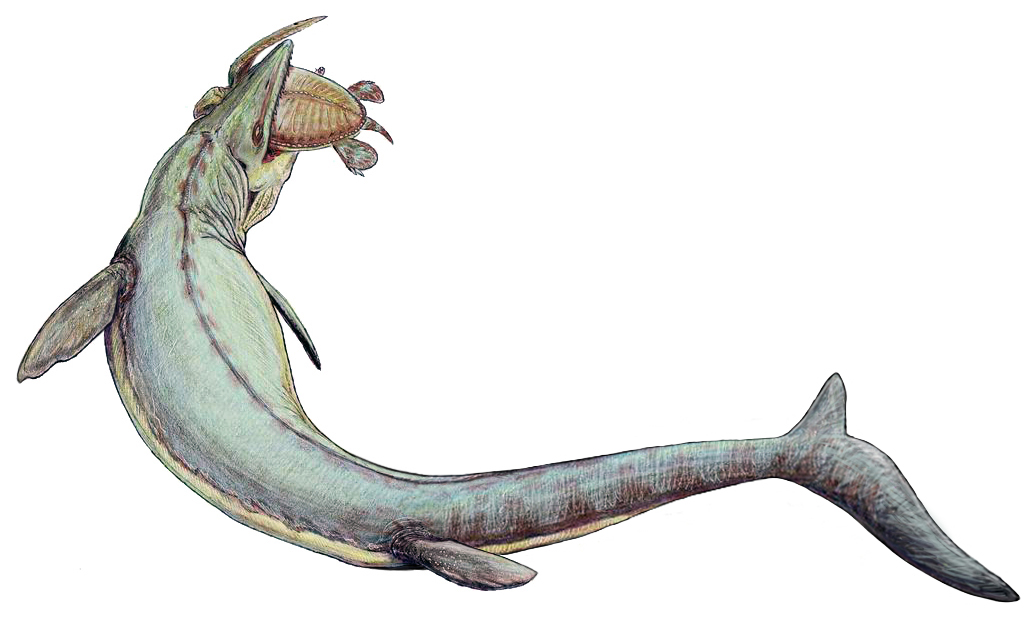
Restoration of Mosasaurus hoffmannii, an extinct marine lizard.

Squamata is the largest order of reptiles, comprising lizards, snakes, and amphisbaenians (worm lizards). There are many examples of aquatic squamates, both living and extinct; a secondarily aquatic lifestyle has evolved multiple times.

Living at the same time as, but not closely related to, dinosaurs, the mosasaurs resembled crocodiles but were more strongly adapted to marine life. Scientists continue to debate on whether monitor lizards or snakes are the closest living relatives of mosasaurs. Mosasaurs became extinct 66 million years ago, at the same time as the non-avian dinosaurs.

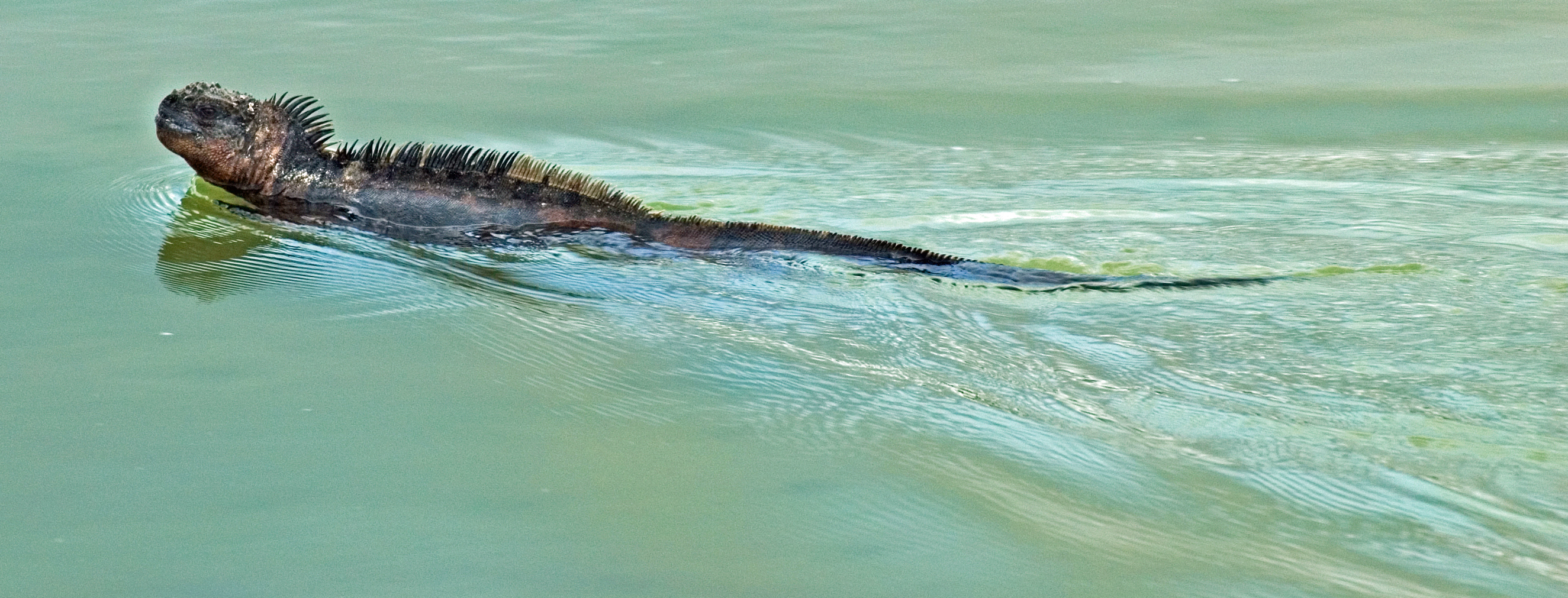
A modern semi-aquatic lizard: the marine iguana

Modern squamates which have made their own adaptions to allow them to spend significant time in the ocean include marine iguanas and sea snakes. Sea snakes are extensively adapted to the marine environment, giving birth to live offspring and are largely incapable of terrestrial activity. The arc of their adaptation is evident by observing the primitive Laticauda genus, which must return to land to lay eggs.

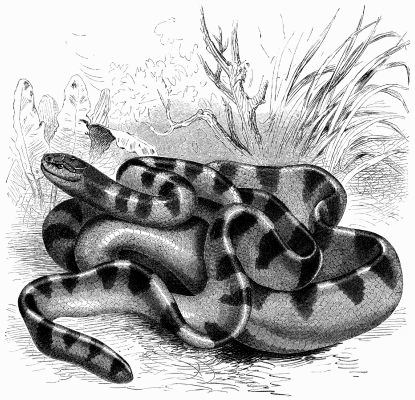
Annulated sea snake

The Annulated sea snake is a species of venomous sea snake that can breathe underwater with help of extensive vascular network across the top of its head to absorb oxygen from the surrounding water.

=== Ichthyosaurs ===
These marine reptiles had ancestors who moved back into the oceans. Ichthyosaurs adapted as fully as the dolphins they superficially resemble, even giving birth to live offspring instead of laying eggs.

=== Crocodilomorphs ===
Crocodilomorphs are a group of reptiles that include crocodilians and their extinct relatives. Many, though not all, crocodilomorphs had an aquatic or semiaquatic lifestyle. One group, the Metriorhynchidae, displayed extreme adaptions for life in the open ocean, including the transformation of limbs into flippers, the development of a tail fluke, smooth, scaleless skin, and probably even live birth.

=== Sauropterygians ===
Sauropterygians developed from terrestrial ancestors soon after the end-Permian extinction and flourished during the Triassic before all except the Plesiosauria became extinct at the end of the period. The plesiosaurs went extinct at the Cretaceous–Paleogene extinction event, the same event which killed the non-avian dinosaurs. Sauropterygians include placodonts, nothosaurs, plesiosaurs, and pliosaurs.

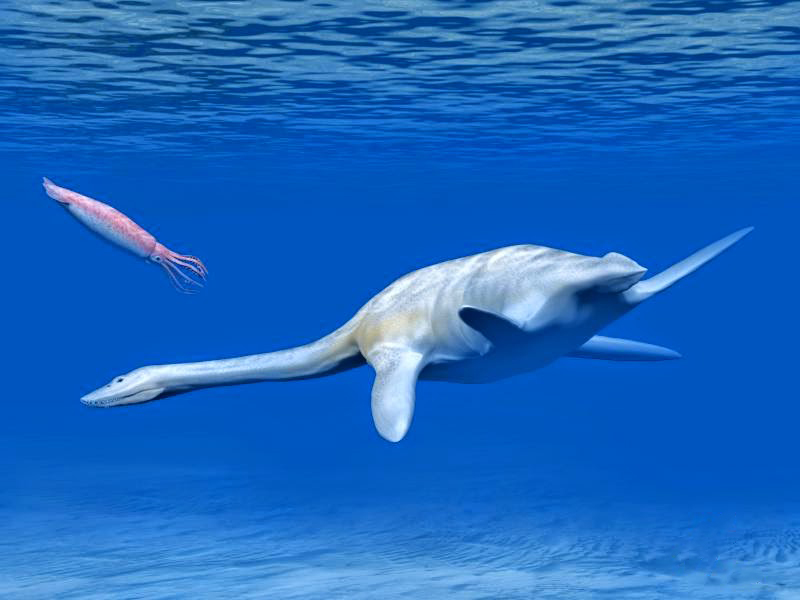
Life reconstruction of Aristonectes quiriquinensis, a plesiosaur.

== Marine mammals ==
=== Cetacea ===
During the Paleocene Epoch (about 66 - 55 million years ago), the ancient whale Pakicetus began pursuing an amphibious lifestyle in rivers or shallow seas. It was the ancestor of modern whales, dolphins, and porpoises. Cetaceans are extensively adapted to marine life and cannot survive on land at all. Their adaptation can be seen in many unique physiognomic characteristics such as the dorsal blowhole, baleen teeth, and the cranial 'melon' organ used for aquatic echolocation. The closest extant terrestrial relative to the whale is the hippopotamus, which spends much of its time in the water and whose name literally means "horse of the river".

=== Sirenians ===
The ancestors of the dugong and manatees first appeared in the fossil record about 45 to 50 million years ago in the ocean.

=== Pinnipeds ===
The fossil record shows that phocids existed 12 to 15 million years ago, and odobenids about 14 million years ago. Their common ancestor must have existed even earlier than that.

=== Polar bears ===
Although polar bears spend most of their time on the ice rather than in the water, polar bears show the beginnings of aquatic adaptation to swimming (high levels of body fat and nostrils that are able to close), diving, and thermoregulation. Distinctly polar bear fossils can be dated to about 100,000 years ago. The polar bear has thick fur and layers of fat on its body to protect it from the cold.

== Speculative theories ==
=== Humans ===
Proponents of the aquatic ape hypothesis believe that part of human evolution includes some aquatic adaptation, which has been said to explain human hairlessness, bipedalism, increased subcutaneous fat, descended larynx, vernix caseosa, a hooded nose and various other physiological and anatomical changes. The idea is not accepted by most scholars who study human evolution.

== See also ==
Related topics

- Fin and flipper locomotion
- Tradeoffs for locomotion in air and water
- Evolution of cetaceans
- Vertebrate land invasion

Lists

- List of marine mammal species
- List of marine reptiles
