= Valentia Island =

Irish island off the Iveragh Peninsula, County Kerry

Native name: Dairbhre
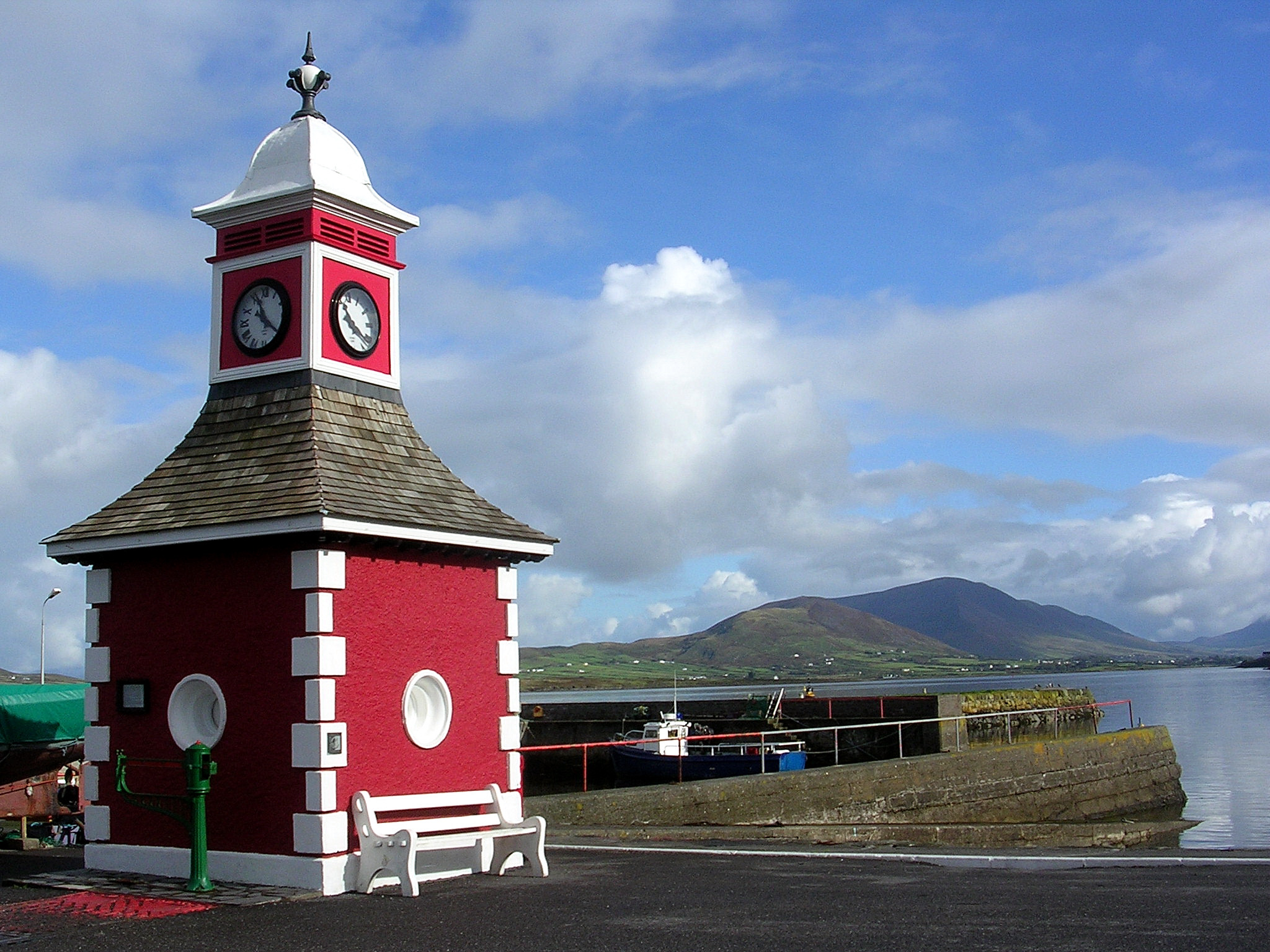
- Knightstown Town clock

- Location within island of Ireland

Geography
- Location: Dingle Bay
- Coordinates: 51.9°N 10.35°W
- Area: 25.7 km^{2} (9.9 sq mi)
- Length: 11 km (6.8 mi)
- Width: 3 km (1.9 mi)

Administration
- Ireland
- Province: Munster
- County: Kerry
- Largest settlement: Knightstown (pop. 244)

Demographics
- Population: 658 (2022)

Valentia Island (Irish: Dairbhre, meaning 'oak isle') is one of Ireland's most westerly points. It lies in Dingle Bay off the Iveragh Peninsula in the southwest of County Kerry. It is linked to the mainland by the Maurice O'Neill Memorial Bridge at Portmagee. A car ferry also departs from Reenard Point to Knightstown, the island's main settlement, from April to October. Another, smaller village named Chapeltown sits at roughly the midpoint of the island, three kilometres (two miles) from the bridge. Valentia Island's permanent population is 658 (as of the 2022 CSO Census). It is about 11 kilometres (7 miles) long by almost three kilometres (two miles) wide, making it the fifth-biggest island off the Irish coast.

== Name ==
The English name 'Valentia' or 'Valencia' Island does not come from the Spanish city of Valencia. Instead it comes from the Irish name of Valentia Harbour, cuan Bhéil Inse, "harbour-mouth of the island". It was anglicised as 'Bealinche' and 'Ballentia' before evolving into 'Valentia'. It is possible the spelling was influenced by Spanish sailors; there is a grave marker to Spanish sailors lost at sea in the Catholic cemetery at Kylemore.

The Irish name for the island is Dairbhre, probably meaning "oak isle". It was historically anglicised as 'Dariry'.

== History ==
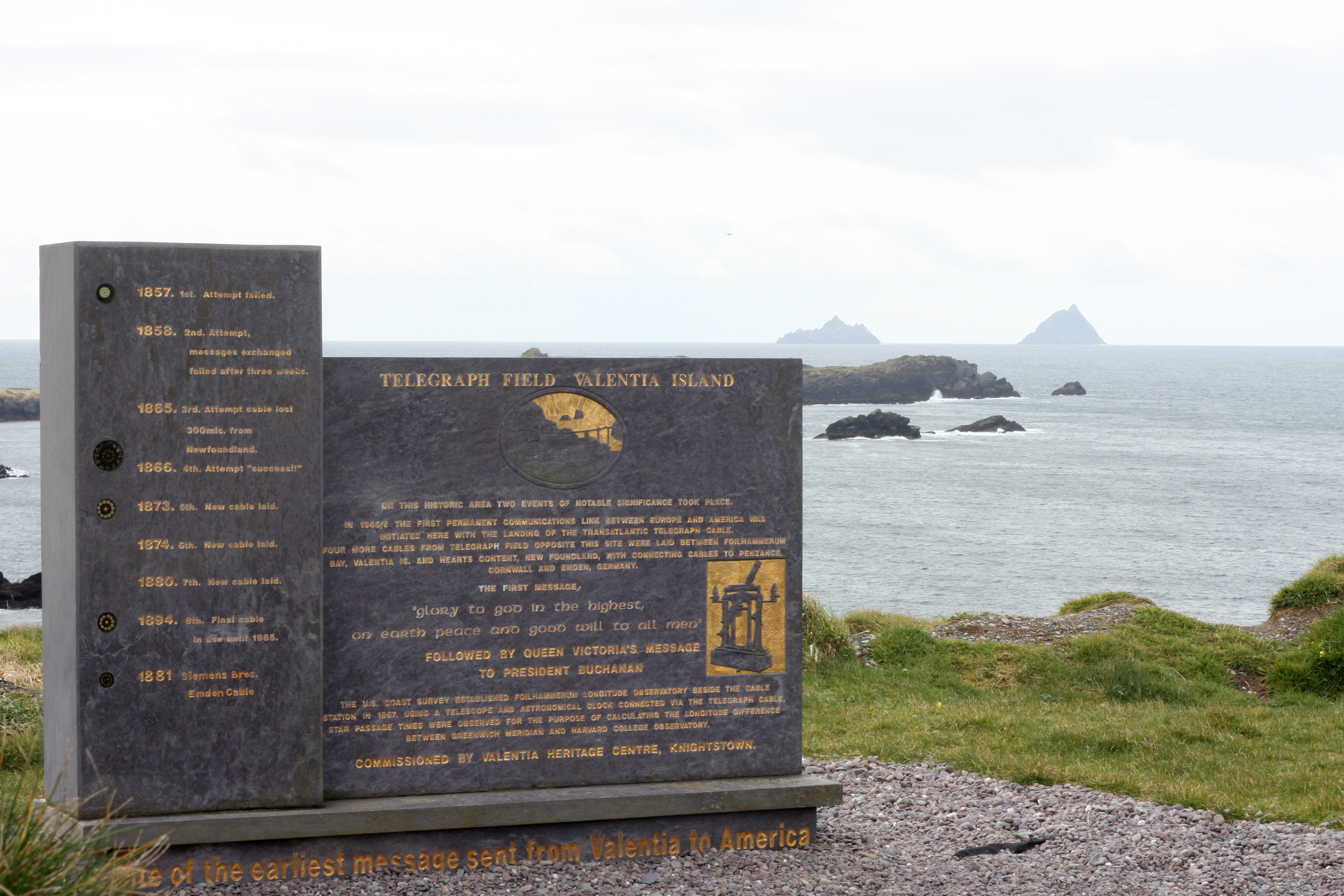
Telegraph Field, Valentia Island: Foilhommerum is the site of the first permanent communications link between Europe and the Americas. In October 2002, a memorial to mark the laying of the transatlantic cable to Heart's Content, Newfoundland was unveiled atop Foilhommerum Cliff. Made of Valentia slate and designed by local sculptor Alan Ryan Hall, the memorial marks the importance of the site to telegraph communications with North America from 1857 forward and to accurately linking longitude measurements in North America to the Royal Observatory in Greenwich in 1866.

Valentia was the eastern terminus of the first commercially viable transatlantic telegraph cable. The first attempt in 1857 to land a cable from Ballycarbery Strand on the mainland just east of Valentia Island ended in disappointment. After subsequent failures of cables landed at Knightstown in 1858 and Foilhommerum Bay in 1865, the vast endeavor finally resulted in commercially viable transatlantic telegraph communications from Foilhommerum Bay to Heart's Content, Newfoundland in 1866. Transatlantic telegraph cables operated from Valentia Island for one hundred years, ending with Western Union International terminating its cable operations in 1966.

Before the transatlantic telegraph, American longitude measurements had a 850-metre (2,800 ft) uncertainty with respect to European longitudes. Because of the importance of accurate longitudes to safe navigation, the United States Coast Survey mounted a longitude expedition in 1866 to link longitudes in the United States accurately to the Royal Observatory in Greenwich. Benjamin Gould and his partner A. T. Mosman reached Valentia on 2 October 1866. They built a temporary longitude observatory beside the Foilhommerum Cable Station to support synchronised longitude observations with Heart's Content, Newfoundland. After many rainy and cloudy days, the first transatlantic longitude signals were exchanged between Foilhommerum and Heart's Content on 24 October 1866. The transatlantic cable is currently on the tentative list of UNESCO World Heritage sites.

On 21 May 1927, Charles A. Lindbergh made his first landfall in Europe over Dingle Bay and Valentia Island on his solo flight from New York to Paris. On the 1927 Mercator chart used by the famous pilot, it was labelled Valencia.

In 1992, a Swiss geology student, Iwan Stössel, discovered fossilised tetrapod trackways, footprints preserved in Devonian rocks, on the north coast of the island at Dohilla (51°55′51″N 10°20′38″W). About 385 million years ago, a primitive vertebrate passed near a river margin in the sub-equatorial river basin that is now southwestern Ireland and left prints in the damp sand. The prints were preserved by silt and sand overlying them, and were converted to rock over geological time. The Valentia Island trackways are among the oldest signs of vertebrate life on land.

On 14 March 2021, Valentia Island was the site of the first walrus sighting in Ireland.

Historical population

Year	Pop.	±%
1841	2,920	—
1851	2,482	−15.0%
1861	2,240	−9.8%
1871	2,139	−4.5%
1881	2,240	+4.7%
1891	2,050	−8.5%
1901	1,864	−9.1%
1911	1,625	−12.8%
1926	1,483	−8.7%

Year	Pop.	±%
1936	1,198	−19.2%
1946	1,102	−8.0%
1951	1,015	−7.9%
1956	971	−4.3%
1961	926	−4.6%
1966	847	−8.5%
1971	770	−9.1%
1979	712	−7.5%
1981	718	+0.8%

Year	Pop.	±%
1986	666	−7.2%
1991	680	+2.1%
1996	676	−0.6%
2002	690	+2.1%
2006	713	+3.3%
2011	665	−6.7%
2016	657	−1.2%
2022	658	+0.2%

Source: Central Statistics Office. "CNA17: Population by Off Shore Island, Sex and Year". CSO.ie.

== Places of interest ==
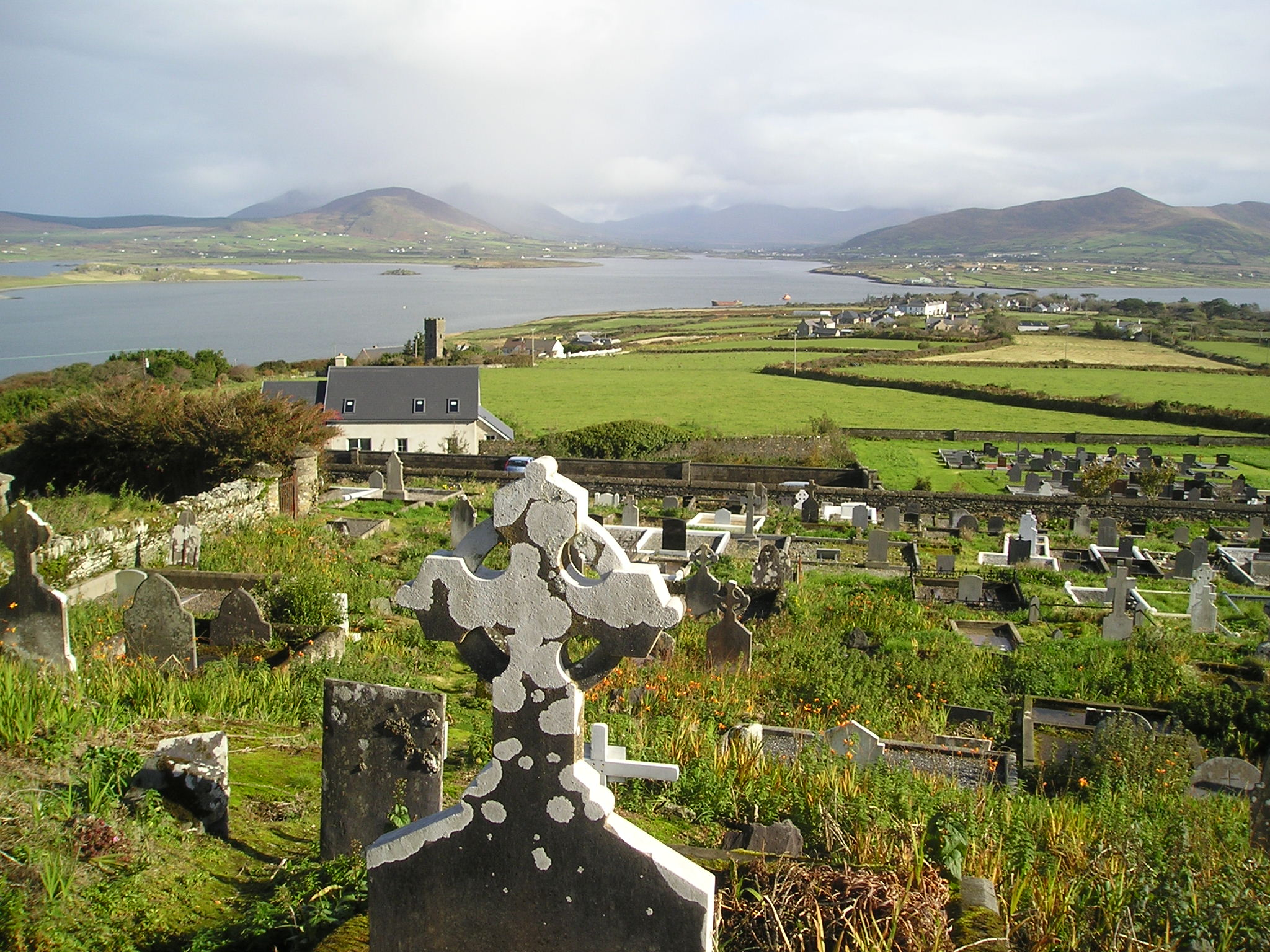
Valentia Harbour from the north shore of Valentia Island (Photo taken at the top of the Catholic cemetery at Kylemore)

The combined features and history of the island make it an attractive tourist destination, easily accessible from the popular Ring of Kerry route.

- Geokaun Mountain and Fogher Cliffs: the highest mountain on Valentia Island and the sea cliffs of 180 metres (600 ft) on its northern face.
- On the northeast of the island stands Glanleam House amid sub-tropical gardens. Protected by windbreaks from Atlantic gales and never touched by frost, these gardens provide the mildest microclimate in Ireland. Starting in the 1830s, Sir Peter George Fitzgerald, the 19th Knight of Kerry (1808–1880), planted these gardens and stocked them with a unique collection of rare and tender plants from the southern hemisphere, normally grown under glass in Ireland. The gardens are laid out in a naturalistic style as a series of walks. There are plants from South America, Australia, New Zealand (the tallest tree ferns in Europe), Chile and Japan. The gardens are memorialised in a selected golden-variegated Luma apiculata "Glanleam Gold" that originated as a sport in the garden. The gardens are open to the public.
- The slate quarry, which reopened in 1998, provided slates for the British Houses of Parliament.
- The island also hosts a heritage centre which tells the story of the geology, human, natural and industrial history of the island, with exhibits on the Cable Station, the Marine Radio Station and the RNLI's Valentia Lifeboat Station.
- The Telegraph Field (or Longitude Field) is the site of the first permanent communications link between Europe and North America Transatlantic telegraph cables operated from Valentia Island from 1866.
- Just off the east end of Valencia island is Beginish Island which still has reminders of a small farming community. Two houses there have been dated to the 12th century.
- In the north-eastern part of the island, on Cromwell's Point, the active Cromwell Point Lighthouse — also referred to as Valentia Lighthouse — is situated.

== Gallery ==
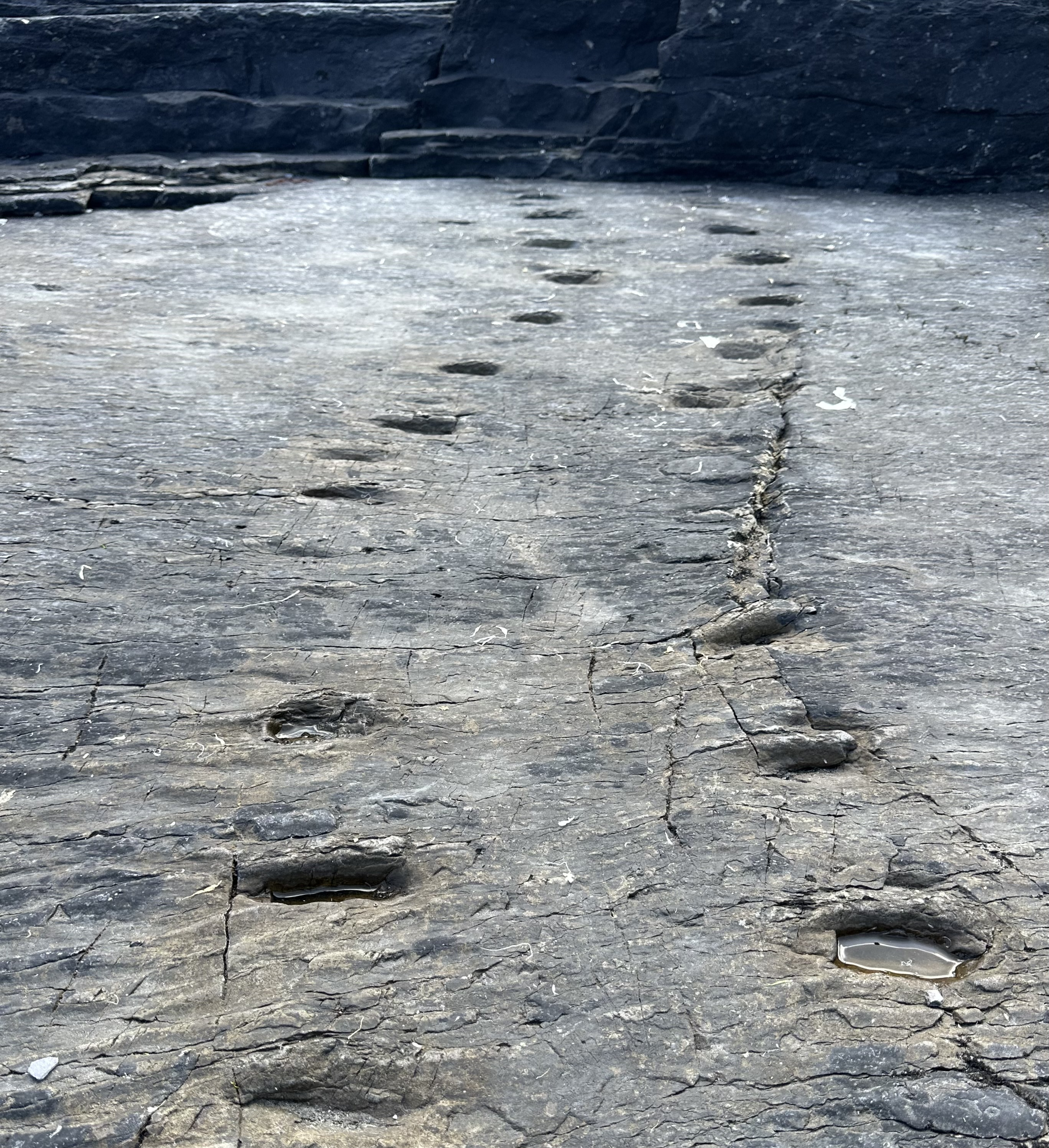
Tetrapod trackways

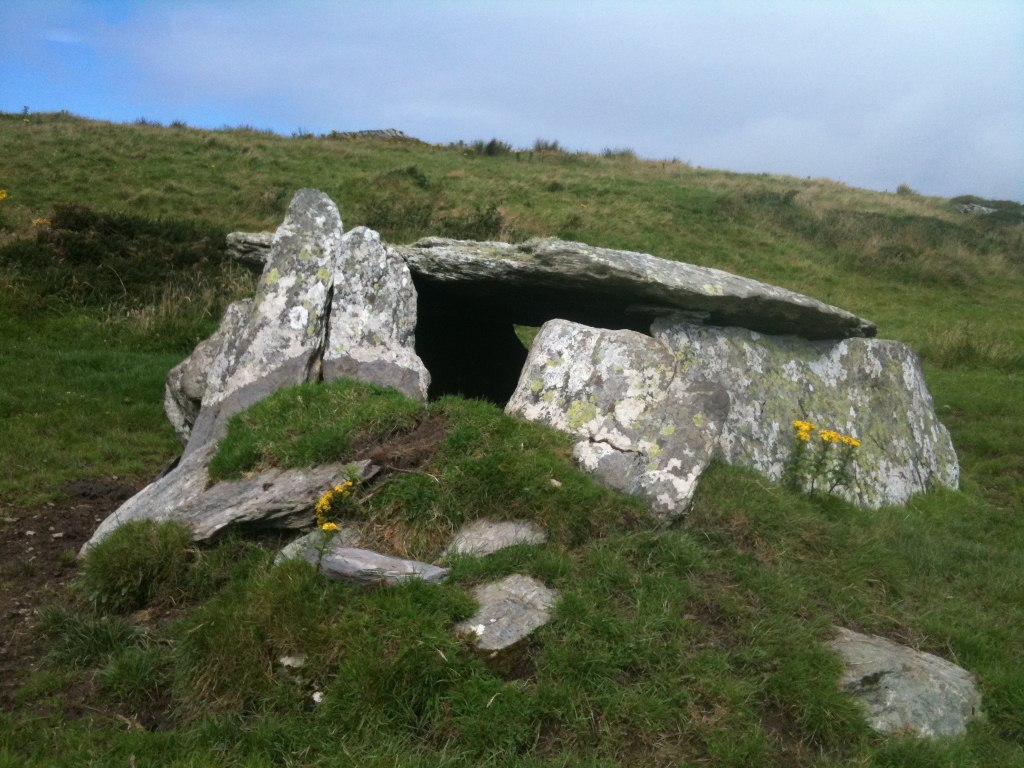
Dolmen Rock, western slope of Mt. Geokaun

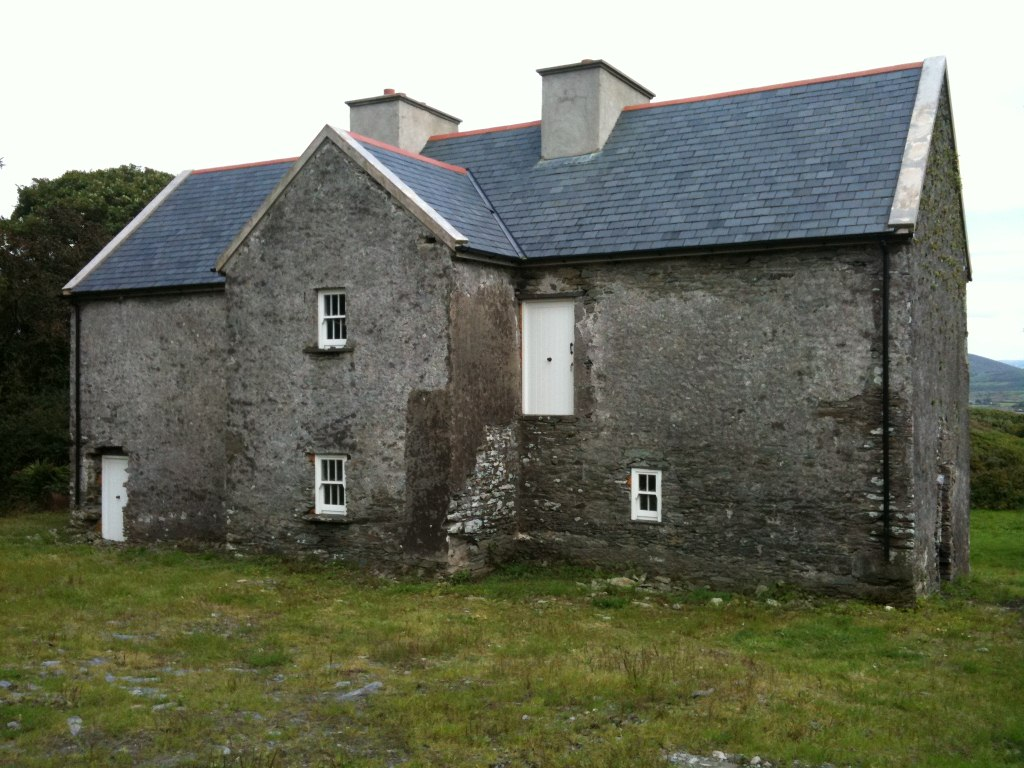
Balleyhearney House, Balleyhearney East. 'Famine Era' hospital adjacent to the Knights' Wood.

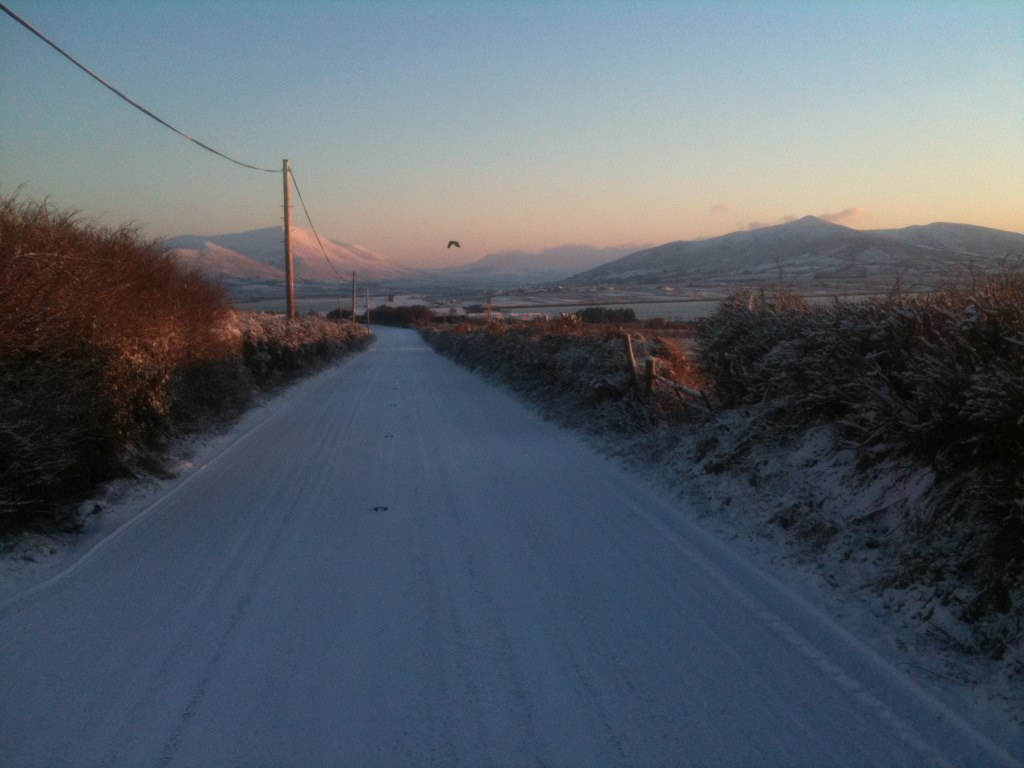
Rare snowy day, Main Road, Valentia Island looking toward Knightstown, Valentia Harbour and Cahersiveen

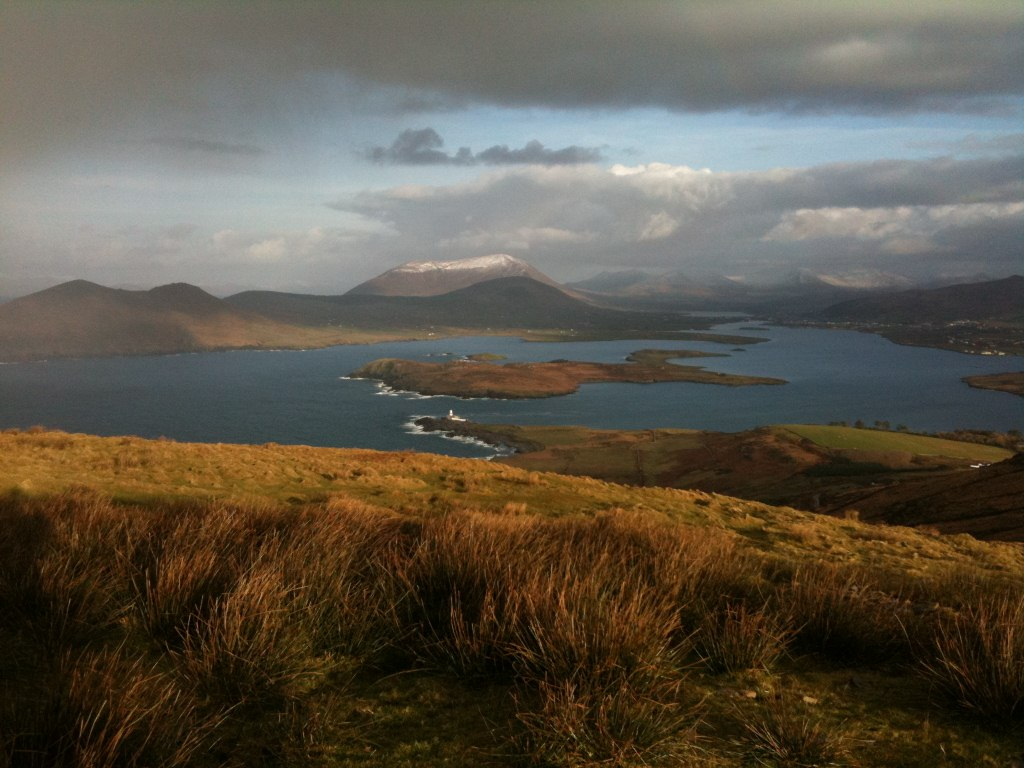
Portion of the view from the summit of Mt. Geokaun ("yo-kawn"). Valentia Harbour and Cahersiveen are in the background

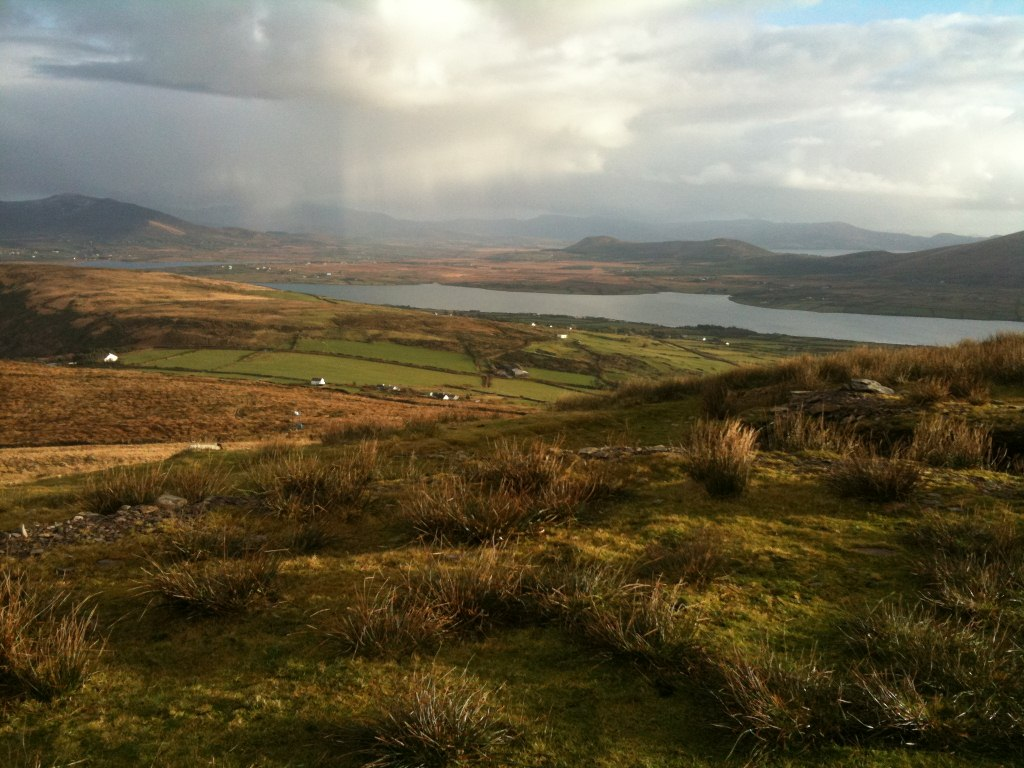
Portion of the view from the summit of Mt. Geokaun ("yo-kawn"). Valentia Harbour and Letter are in the background

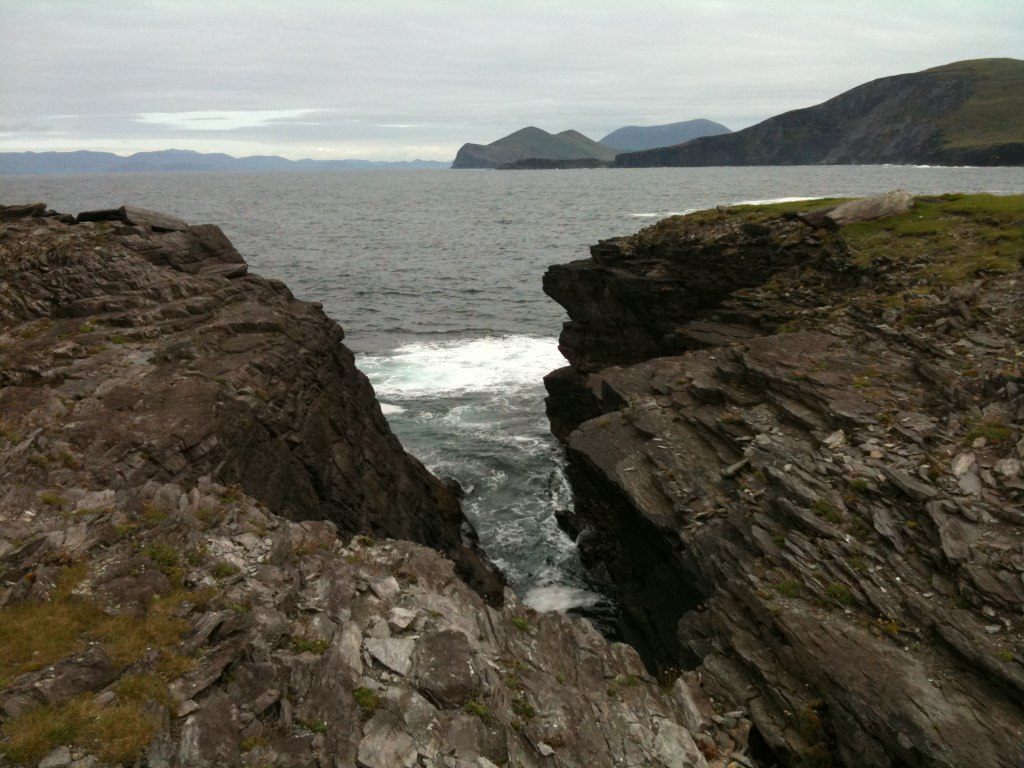
View from Culloo Rock. Dingle Peninsula, Dingle Bay and the north shore of Valentia Island (including Fogher Cliffs) are in the background.

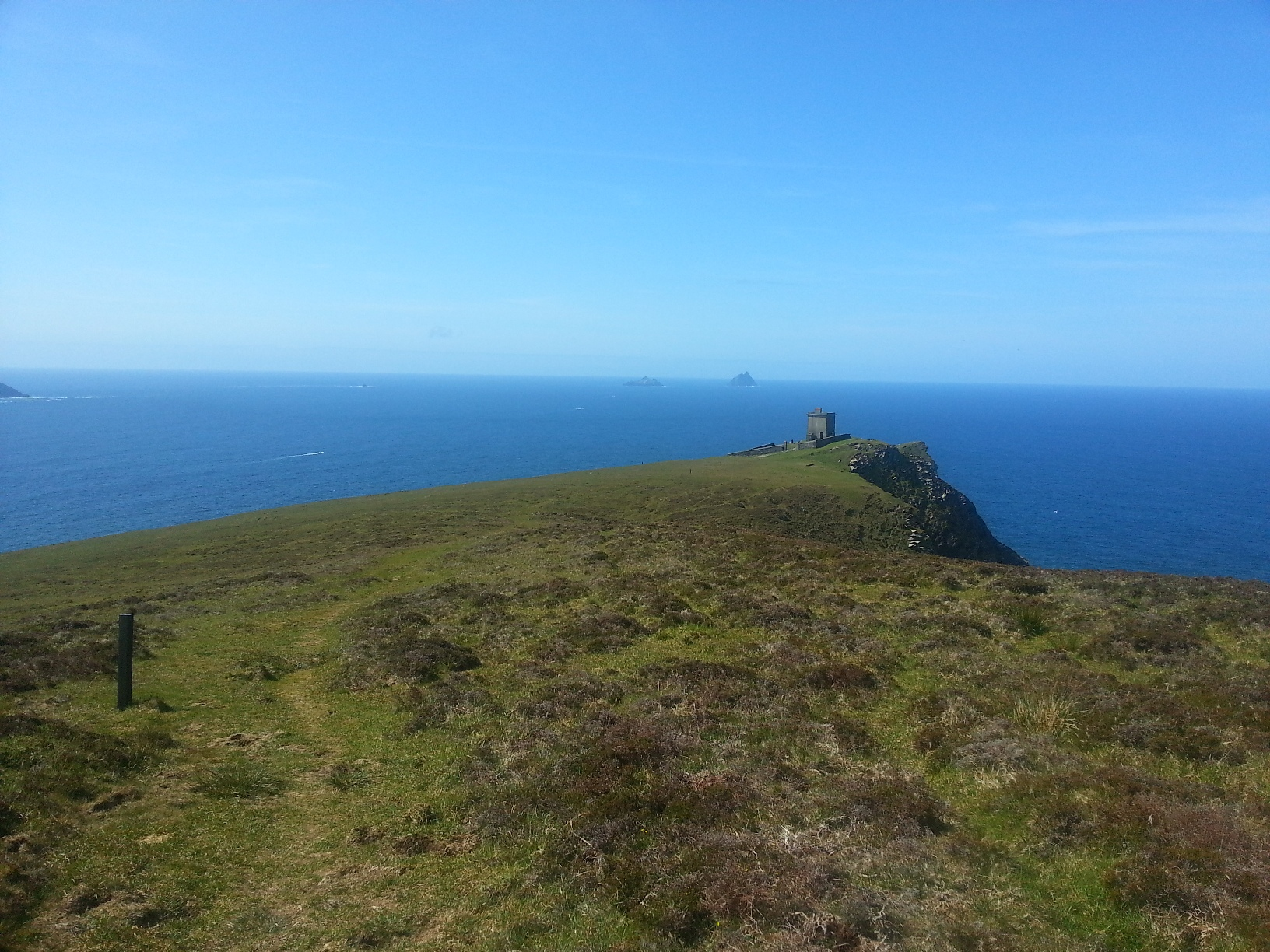
Bray Head view looking west with Bray Tower and Skellig Islands in distance

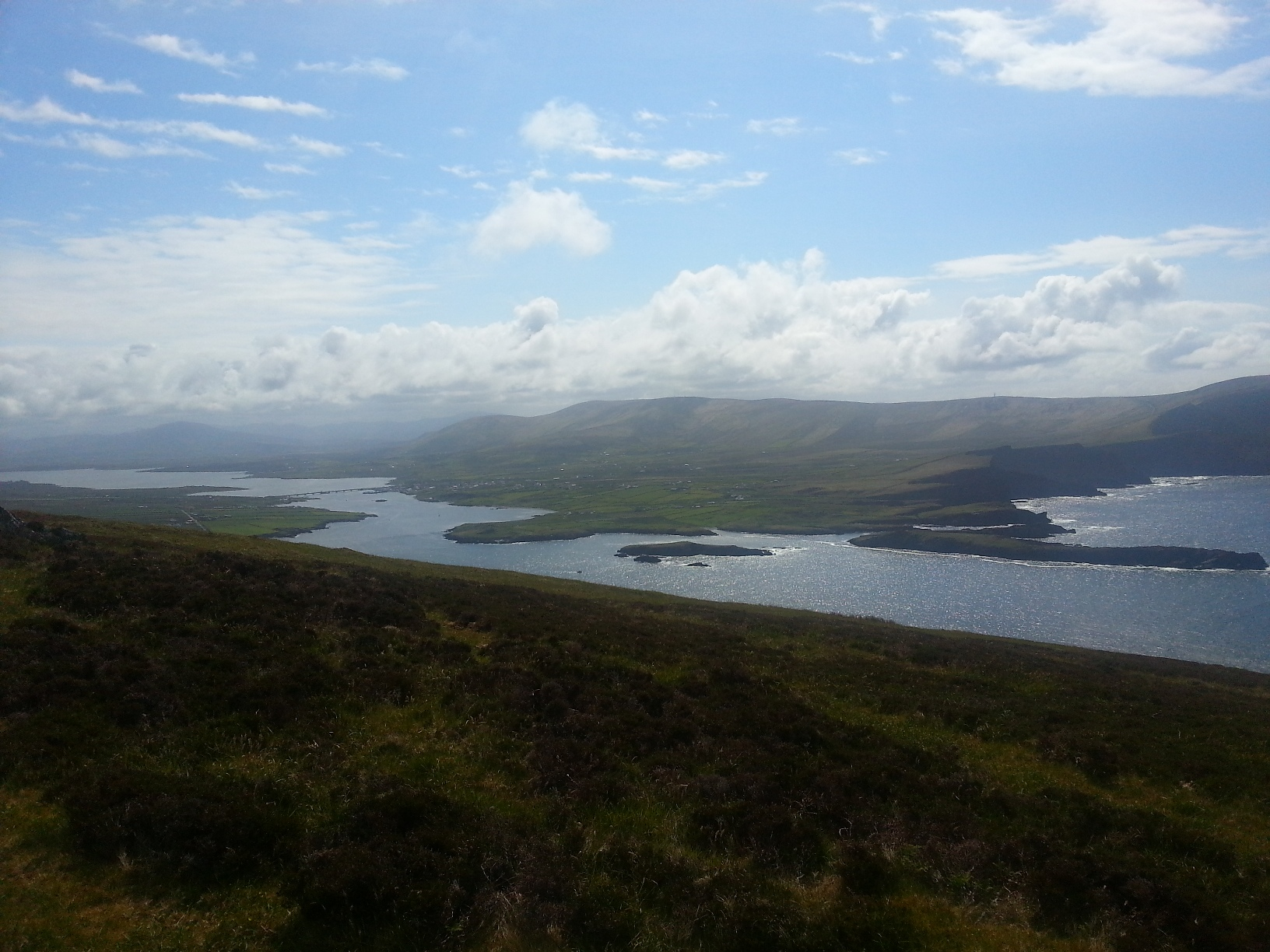
View of Portmagee Channel looking south-east from Bray Head

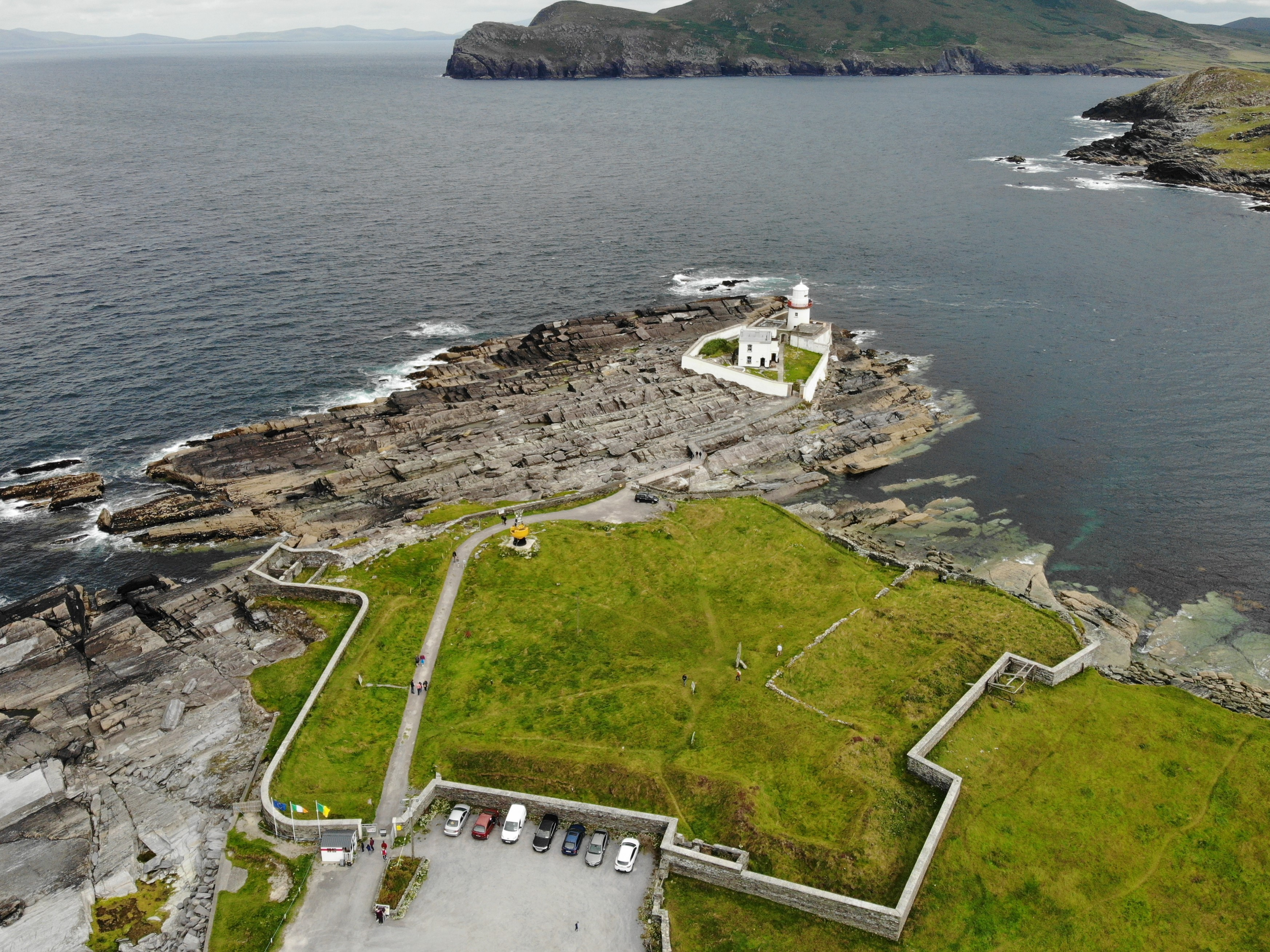
Valentia lighthouse and surrounding fortifications

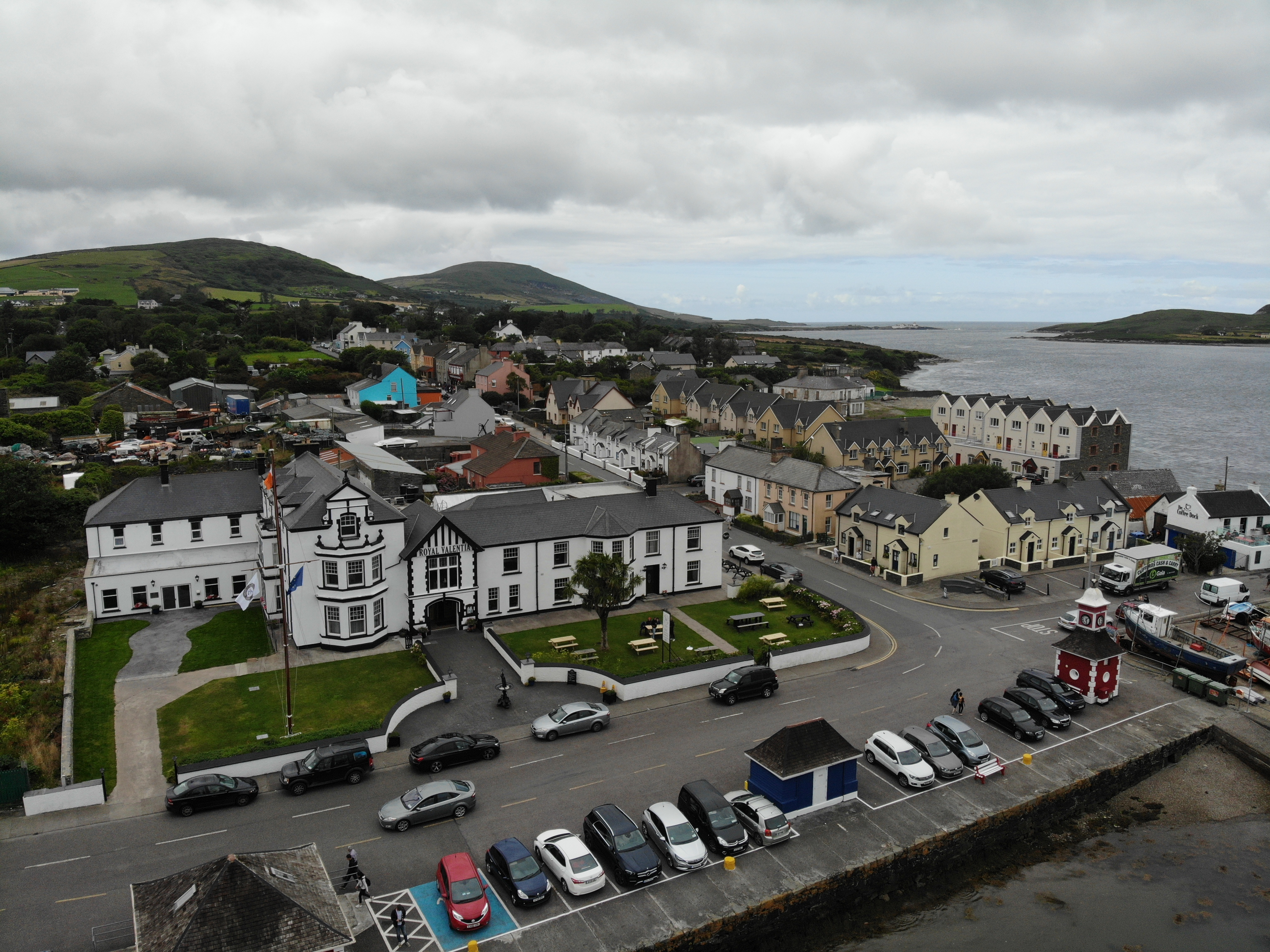
Knightstown

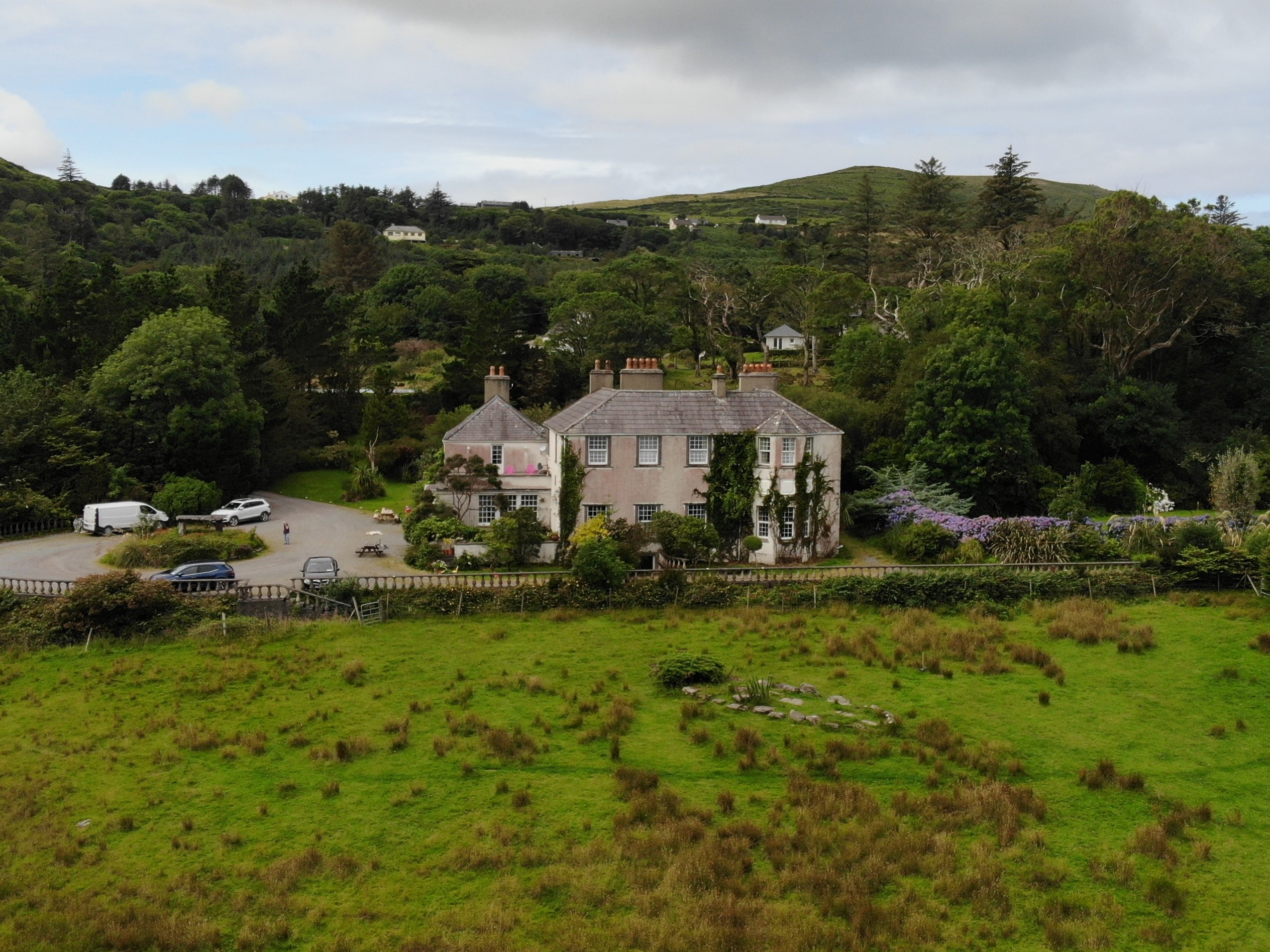
Glanleam House

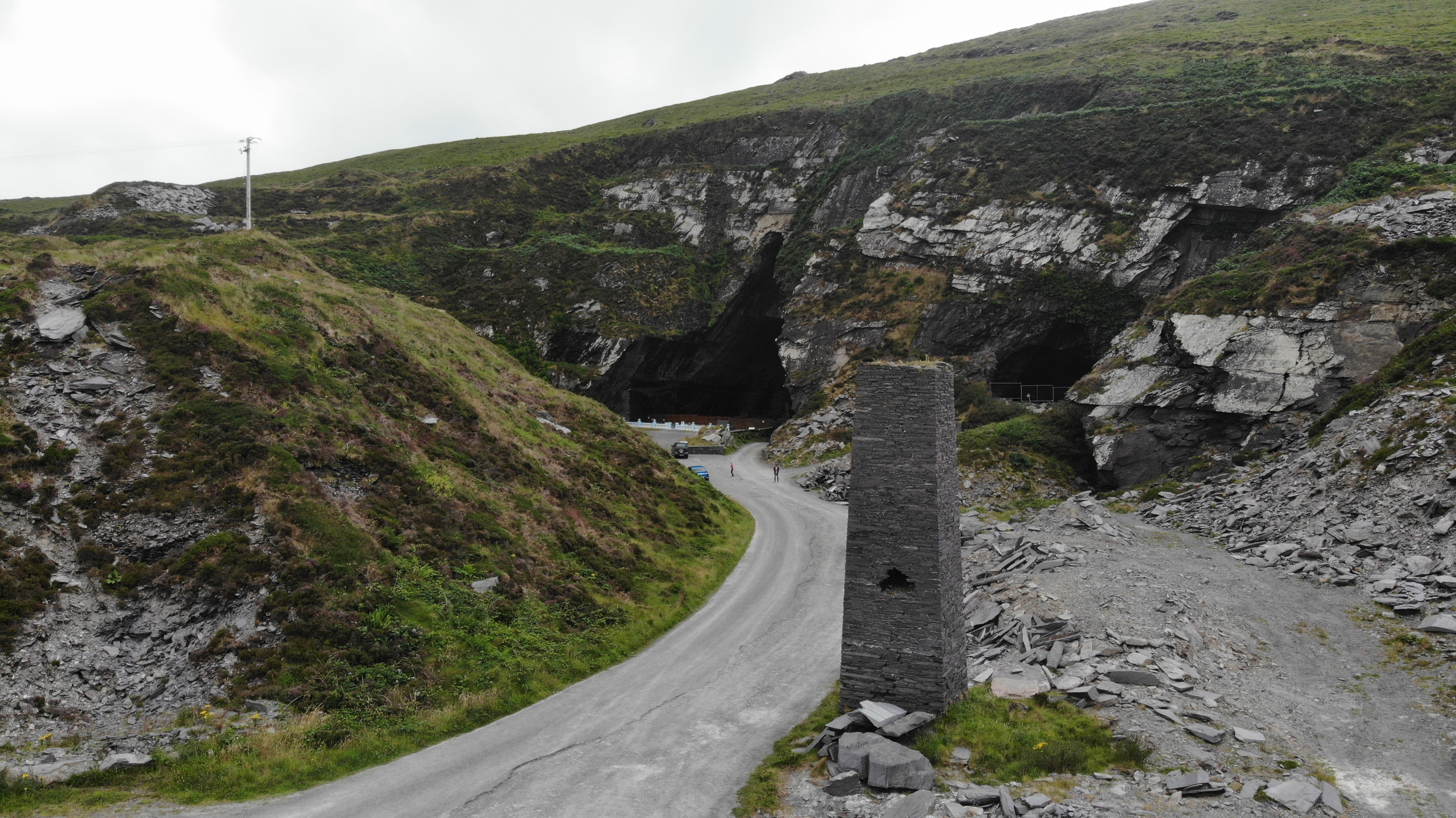
Valentia Slate Quarry

== Climate ==
Valentia Island has an oceanic climate (Cfb). Sitting on the eastern edge of the Atlantic Ocean, Valentia Island is, on average, the wettest weather station in Ireland. Despite its being on the same latitude as St. Anthony in Newfoundland on the opposite side of the Atlantic, it enjoys much milder winters thanks to the moderating effect of prevailing west or southwest winds, and the effects of the warming North Atlantic Current. Snow and frost are rare, and because of this the island can support many sub-tropical varieties of plants.

Climate data for Valentia Island, elevation: 24 m (79 ft) (1991-2020 normals, extremes 1882-present)
Month	Jan	Feb	Mar	Apr	May	Jun	Jul	Aug	Sep	Oct	Nov	Dec	Year
Record high °C (°F)	14.8 (58.6)	17.2 (63.0)	20.7 (69.3)	24.7 (76.5)	29.6 (85.3)	28.5 (83.3)	30.0 (86.0)	29.8 (85.6)	28.4 (83.1)	23.9 (75.0)	19.8 (67.6)	15.7 (60.3)	30.0 (86.0)
Mean daily maximum °C (°F)	9.8 (49.6)	9.9 (49.8)	10.8 (51.4)	12.4 (54.3)	14.5 (58.1)	16.6 (61.9)	17.8 (64.0)	18.0 (64.4)	16.9 (62.4)	14.4 (57.9)	11.8 (53.2)	10.4 (50.7)	13.6 (56.5)
Daily mean °C (°F)	7.4 (45.3)	7.5 (45.5)	8.2 (46.8)	9.6 (49.3)	11.7 (53.1)	13.8 (56.8)	15.3 (59.5)	15.4 (59.7)	14.3 (57.7)	12.0 (53.6)	9.5 (49.1)	8.1 (46.6)	11.1 (52.0)
Mean daily minimum °C (°F)	5.1 (41.2)	5.1 (41.2)	5.5 (41.9)	6.7 (44.1)	8.8 (47.8)	11.1 (52.0)	12.9 (55.2)	12.8 (55.0)	11.7 (53.1)	9.5 (49.1)	7.2 (45.0)	5.8 (42.4)	8.5 (47.3)
Record low °C (°F)	−7.2 (19.0)	−7.3 (18.9)	−5.1 (22.8)	−2.3 (27.9)	0.2 (32.4)	1.7 (35.1)	4.4 (39.9)	3.3 (37.9)	1.7 (35.1)	−2.2 (28.0)	−5.1 (22.8)	−7.7 (18.1)	−7.7 (18.1)
Average precipitation mm (inches)	187.0 (7.36)	137.1 (5.40)	116.1 (4.57)	108.4 (4.27)	94.4 (3.72)	100.8 (3.97)	117.2 (4.61)	114.2 (4.50)	129.8 (5.11)	173.0 (6.81)	189.2 (7.45)	179.4 (7.06)	1,646.5 (64.82)
Average precipitation days (≥ 1.0 mm)	20.8	17.8	16.4	14.1	13.5	12.8	16.0	15.6	16.5	18.2	21.0	20.4	203.1
Average relative humidity (%)	81.4	80.2	78.9	77.8	79.0	81.4	84.6	83.8	82.5	81.7	82.2	81.3	81.2
Average dew point °C (°F)	4.7 (40.5)	4.4 (39.9)	4.7 (40.5)	5.8 (42.4)	8.1 (46.6)	10.6 (51.1)	12.6 (54.7)	12.6 (54.7)	11.3 (52.3)	8.9 (48.0)	6.8 (44.2)	5.3 (41.5)	8.0 (46.4)
Mean monthly sunshine hours	46.0	64.9	106.3	159.5	177.1	168.8	135.5	141.1	120.7	88.8	54.3	37.7	1,300.7
Source 1: Met Éireann
Source 2: NOAA Servizio Meteorologico (extremes)

== Transport ==
The R565 road is the main road onto the island. There are two connections to the Irish mainland, the fixed Maurice O'Neill Memorial Bridge to Portmagee, and a seasonal vehicle ferry service from Knightstown.

== Sport ==
Valentia Young Islanders GAA is the local Gaelic Athletic Association club.

Valentia is a popular fishing location, and Valentia waters hold the Irish records for conger eel, red sea bream, Ray's bream and lesser spotted dogfish.

== Notable people ==
- Helen Blackburn who was a leading women's rights campaigner in England was born here in 1842.
- Valentia was considered home to Mug Ruith, a powerful blind druid in Irish mythology.
- The O'Sullivans, headed by the O'Sullivan Beare, owned much of Valentia until the 17th century.
- The naturalist Maude Jane Delap lived and worked in Knightstown, carrying out research into the marine life surrounding Valentia and identifying many new species.
- Valentia is the home of former Gaelic footballer Mick O'Connell, and the birthplace of John J "Sceilg" O'Kelly, leader of Sinn Féin from 1926.
- Gaelic footballer Ger O'Driscoll was born on Valentia Island.
- The American solo rock climber Michael Reardon died on 13 July 2007 at the Fogher Cliffs of Valentia Island when he was swept out to sea following a climb.
- Gerald Spring Rice, 6th Baron Monteagle of Brandon was brought up on the island, as were many other members of the Spring Rice family.

== See also ==
- List of RNLI stations
