= Bray Tower =

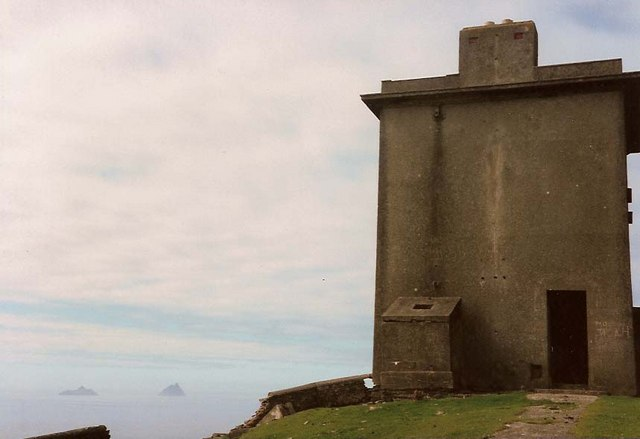
- Interactive map of the Bray Tower area

General information
- Type: Signal tower
- Location: Valentia Island, County Kerry, Ireland
- Coordinates: 51.8854°N 10.4249°W
- Year built: 1805

Design and construction
- Designations: Sites and Monuments Records (SMR) KE087-107----

Bray Tower is a signal tower located on Valentia Island in County Kerry, Ireland. The tower was built in 1805 by the British Board of Ordnance during the Napoleonic Wars. It was one of 81 signal towers built between 1804 and 1806 along the Irish coast to communicate naval activity in response to a possible French invasion. The tower was abandoned sometime during the mid-1810s.

Bray Tower was used as a Naval War Signal Station during World War I.

In August 2020, the Kerry County Council submitted a proposal with An Bord Pleanála to preserve Bray Tower and construct a rooftop viewing platform.

Bray Tower was included as a proposed addition to the Record of Protected Structures as part of the Draft Kerry County Development Plan 2022–2028.
