= Vertebrate land invasion =

Evolution of tetrapods to live on land

The vertebrate land invasion or vertebrate terrestrialization refers to the eco-evolutionary transition of Paleozoic vertebrate animals, more specifically of the sarcopterygian clade Tetrapodomorpha, from aquatic "fishapods" to predominantly terrestrial/semiaquatic tetrapods (primarily amphibians) during the Late Devonian period. Many of these early terrestrial vertebrates were also the first to evolve physical adaptations such as neck mobility, more efficient lungs, air-transmitted hearing and olfaction, water-retaining integuments and physiology, and robust appendicular skeleton for limb weightbearing and terrestrial locomotion.

The Late Devonian vertebrate terrestrialization was preceded by the terrestrial floral expansion of plants and fungi during the Late Silurian, as well as the large-scale land invasion by invertebrates (primarily arthropods, particularly arachnids, hexapods and myriopods) quickly after the plants. These biotic colonization on land created vast swathes of primitive wetlands and later coal forests during the Late Devonian and Early Carboniferous, allowing for the development of terrestrial ecosystems that would be available to accommodate habitation by semiaquatic amphibian vertebrates such as temnospondyls and lepospondyls, latter of which is thought to give rise to the fully terrestrial amniotes during the Late Carboniferous and Early Permian periods. The Late Devonian mass extinction, thought to be at least partially caused by a global aquatic anoxia, further catalyzed the terrestrial evolution of tetrapods by selectively favoring those more capable of directly breathing in the increasingly abundant oxygen gas in the Devonian atmosphere instead of relying on aquatic respiration of dissolved oxygen.

Fossil record from the Late Devonian has allowed scientists to identify some of the species that existed during this transition, such as Tiktaalik and Acanthostega. The transition from aquatic to land habitats allowed these vertebrates to escape competitive pressure from other aquatic animals and explore new ecological niches. The comparatively larger body sizes of vertebrates over invertebrates, coupled with a more robust closed circulatory system and a myelinated, highly encephalized nervous system that allow much more efficient cognition, sensory perception and motor control, allowed terrestrial vertebrates to quickly outcompete terrestrial invertebrates and ascend in trophic levels, eventually establishing vertebrates as the supreme phylum of the terrestrial food webs.

While the Late Devonian terrestrialization was the first and only major land invasion by vertebrates, other aquatic species (e.g. amphibious fishes) have continued to develop adaptations suited to terrestrial/semiaquatic life from the Late Devonian to the Holocene, and vice versa as successive groups of amniote tetrapods also evolved secondary re-adaptation to aquatic life later on. For example, several groups of now-extinct marine reptiles, who descended from terrestrial sauropsid tetrapods that re-invaded the ocean during various periods of the Mesozoic, was responsible for the so-called Mesozoic marine revolution that transformed the marine ecosystems.

== Overview of transition ==
The vertebrate species that were important to the initial water-to-land transition can be sorted into five phases: aquatic sarcopterygians, prototetrapods, stem tetrapods (or "fishapods"), semiaquatic amphibians and fully terrestrial amniotes, the last two considered true tetrapods. Many morphological changes occurred throughout this transition. Mechanical support structures changed from paired fins to limbs, the method of locomotion changed from aquatic (swimming) to terrestrial (crawling and walking), respiratory structures changed from gills to lungs, feeding mechanisms changed from suction feeding to biting/gulping, and mode of reproduction changed from larval development to metamorphosis.

== Evolutionary timeline ==
Lungfish appeared approximately 400 million years ago, undergoing rapid evolution during the Devonian era, which became known as the dipnoan renaissance. Acanthostega sometimes known as “the fish with legs”, is considered a tetrapodomorph but is postulated to have perhaps never left the aquatic environment. Its legs are not well-suited to support its weight. The bones of its forearm, the radius and ulna, are very thin at the wrist and also unable to support it on land. It also lacks a sacrum and strong ligaments at the hip, which would be integral to supporting the animal against gravity. Furthermore, its gill bars have a supportive brace characterized for use as an underwater ear because it can pick up noise vibrations through the water. Tetrapods that adapted to terrestrial living adapted these gill bones to pick up sounds through air, and they later became the middle ear bones seen in mammalian tetrapods.

Ichthyostega, on the other hand, is considered to be a fully terrestrial tetrapodomorph that perhaps depended on water for its aquatic young. Comparisons between the skeletal features of Acanthostega and Ichthyostega reveal that they had different habits. Acanthostega is likely exclusive to an aquatic environment, while Ichthyostega is progressed in the aquatic to terrestrial transition by living dominantly on the shores.

An evolutionary timeline of the late Devonian vertebrate terrestrial invasion demonstrates the changes that took place. A group of fish from the Givetian stage began developing limbs, and eventually evolved into aquatic tetrapods in the Famennian stage. Pederpes, Westlothiana, Proterogyrinus, and Crassigyrinus descended from these species into the Early Carboniferous period and were the first land vertebrates, indicating the crown group originated and split in that time, around 350 Ma.

A particularly important transitional species is one known as Tiktaalik. It has a fin, but the fin has bones within it that are similar to mammalian tetrapods. It has an upper arm bone, a lower arm bone, forearm bones, a wrist, and fingerlike projections. Essentially, it is a fin that can support the animal. Similarly, it also has a neck that allows independent head movement from the body. Its ribs are also able to support the body in gravity. Its skeletal features exhibit its ability as a fish that can live in shallow water and also venture onto land.

== Driving factors ==
It took many millions of years for vertebrates to transition out of water onto land. During this time, perhaps competitive pressures pushed species out of the water and certainly niche occupation incentives pulled species onto land. The culmination of these driving factors are what ultimately facilitated the vertebrate transition.

=== Evolutionary pushes ===
Scientists believe that a long period of time where biotic and abiotic factors in the aquatic environment were unfavourable to certain aquatic organisms is what pushed their transition to shallower waters. Some of these push factors are environmental hypoxia, unsuitable aquatic temperatures, and increased salinity. Other constantly present factors such as predation, competition, waterborne diseases and parasites also contributed to the transition.

A theory put forth by Joseph Barrell possibly helps explain what may have initiated these push factors to become relevant in the late Devonian. The extensive oxidized sediments that were present in Europe and North America (since they lived in Euramerica) during the late Devonian are evidence of severe droughts during this time. These droughts would cause small ponds and lakes to dry out, forcing certain aquatic organisms to move on land to find other bodies of water. Natural selection on these organisms eventually led to the evolution of the first terrestrial vertebrates.

=== Evolutionary pulls ===
The pull factors were secondary to the push factors, and only became significant once the pressures to leave the aquatic environment became significant. These were largely the niches and opportunities that were available for exploitation in the terrestrial environment, and include higher environmental oxygen partial pressures, favourable temperatures, and the lack of competitors and predators on land. The plants and invertebrates that had preceded the vertebrate invasion also provided opportunities in the form of abundant prey and lack of predators.

== Barriers to transition ==
There were many challenges that the first land vertebrates faced. These challenges allowed for rapid natural selection and niche domination, resulting in an adaptive radiation that produced many different vertebrate land species in a relatively short period of time.

=== Anatomical ===
The primary anatomical barrier is the development of lungs for proper gas exchange (although rudimentary lungs are ancestral to bony fish), however other anatomical barriers also exist. The stressors of the musculoskeletal system are different in air than they are in water, and the muscles and bones must be strong enough to withstand the increased effects of gravity on land. The tongue and the three chambered heart evolved similarly for efficient digestion and blood circulation on land respectively. The vomeronasal organ is found in many living tetrapods but not any fish, suggesting it originated in tetrapods only. Similarly, all tetrapods have parathyroid glands which other animals don't.

Depending on the water depth at which a species lives, the visual perception of many aquatic species is better suited to darker environments than those on land. Similarly, hearing in aquatic organisms is better optimized for sounds underwater, where the speed and amplitude of sound is greater than in air. The spiracle of their ancestors, once used for breathing, was repurposed to hold a eardrum inside, connected to the pharynx by the auditory tube (from spiracle) and to the otic vesicle by the columella (from hyomandibula), for hearing.

=== Physiological ===
Homeostasis was almost definitely a challenge for land invading vertebrates. Gas exchange and water balance are highly different in water and in air. Homeostasis mechanisms suitable for a terrestrial environment may have been necessary to develop before these organisms invaded land.

=== Behaviourial ===
Many behaviours, such as reproduction, are specifically optimized to a wet environment. Navigation and locomotion are also highly different in aquatic environments compared to terrestrial environments.

== Notable adaptations ==
=== Placement of eyes on head ===
The ancestral species of tetrapods that lived entirely in water had tall and narrow skulls with eyes facing sideways and forwards to maximize visibility for predators and prey in the aquatic environment. As the ancestors of early tetrapods started inhabiting shallower waters, these species had flatter skulls with eyes at the tops of their heads. The eyes almost tripled in size, and compared with sunlit underwater conditions, the volume of visible space above water during daylight increased approximately a million times. Once the tetrapods transitioned onto land, the lineages evolved to have tall and narrow skulls with eyes facing sideways and forwards again. This allowed them to navigate through the terrestrial environment and look for predators and prey.

=== Head and neck mobility ===
Fish do not have necks, so the head is directly connected to the shoulders. In contrast, land animals use necks to move their heads so they can look down to see the food on the ground. The greater the mobility of the neck, the more visibility the land animal has. As lineages moved from completely aquatic environments to shallower waters and land, they gradually evolved vertebral columns that increased neck mobility. The first neck vertebra that evolved permitted the animals to have flexion and extension of the head so that they can see up and down. The second neck vertebra evolved to allow rotation of the neck for moving the head left and right. As tetrapod species continued to evolve on land, adaptations included seven or more vertebrae, allowing increasing neck mobility.

=== Fused sacrum ===
The sacrum connects the pelvis and hindlimbs and is useful for motion on land. The aquatic ancestors of tetrapods did not have a sacrum, so it was speculated to have evolved for locomotive function exclusive to terrestrial environments. However, the Acanthostega species is one of the earliest lineages to have a sacrum, even though it is a fully aquatic species. Once species moved onto land, the trait was adapted for terrestrial locomotion support, which is evidenced by additional vertebrae fusing similarly to permit additional support. This is an example of exaptation, where a trait performs a function that did not arise through natural selection for its current use.

=== Lost adaptations ===
As the lineages evolved to adapt to terrestrial environments, many lost traits that were better suited for the aquatic environment. Many lost their gills, which were only useful for obtaining oxygen in water. Their caudal, dorsal, and anal fins reduced in size before completely disappearing. They lost the lateral line system, a network of canals along the skull and jaw that are sensitive to vibration, which does not work outside of an aquatic environment.

== Future invasions ==
For successful land invasion, the species had several pre-adaptations like air-breathing and limb-based locomotion. Aspects such as reproduction and swallowing, however, have bound these species to the aquatic environment. These pre-adaptations have allowed vertebrates to venture onto land hundreds of times, but were not able to accomplish the same degree of prolific radiation into diverse terrestrial species. To understand the potential of future invasions, studies must evaluate the models of evolutionary steps taken in past invasions. The commonalities to current and future invasions may then be elucidated to predict the effects of environmental changes.

== See also ==
- Skeletal changes of vertebrates transitioning from water to land
