= Dromore =

Dromore may refer to:

== Places ==
- Dromore, Ontario, Canada
- Dromore (crater), a crater in the Lunae Palus quadrangle of Mars

=== Northern Ireland ===
- Dromore, County Down
- Dromore, County Tyrone

=== Republic of Ireland ===
- Dromore, County Clare, townland in the civil parish of Ruan
- Dromore Lough, County Clare, a lake in Dromore townland
- Dromore, County Westmeath, townland in the civil parish of Castletownkindalen, Barony of Moycashel
- Dromore West, County Sligo

== Other ==
- Bishop of Dromore, named for the town in County Down; the pre-Reformation antecedent of:
  - Roman Catholic Diocese of Dromore
  - Diocese of Down and Dromore, in the Church of Ireland
- Baron Dromore, subsidiary title of Viscount Scudamore in the Peerage of Ireland
- Dromore Amateurs F.C., an association football club in Northern Ireland

== See also ==
- Dromore Castle (disambiguation)
