= List of castles in County Kerry =

Location of County Kerry

County Kerry, Ireland is home to a wide range of fortified castle structures. The castles below are referenced by the Irish National Grid on Ordnance Survey maps.

== Overview ==
Castles and maps listed below are sourced mainly from the Discovery (Irish TV) series. The series attributed the maps below (Scale: 1:50 000) to Ordnance Survey Ireland, the former Irish national mapping agency. Most of the listed castles and forts clearly indicated on the maps and are accessible to walkers and the general public. Some maps use the older SCALE 1:126,720 from the series published in 1986.

=== Map Sheets Covering Kerry ===
- O.S. Sheet 63 - North West Kerry & Shannon Estuary, Listowel.
- O.S. Sheet 64 - North East Kerry, Tarbert & Newcastlewest.
- O.S. Sheet 70 - Dingle Peninsula
- O.S. Sheet 71 - Tralee & Tralee Bay
- O.S. Sheet 72 - Cork, Kerry & Limerick Borders
- O.S. Sheet 78 - South Kerry, Killarney & Kenmare
- O.S. Sheet 79 - South East Kerry, Cork & Kerry Borders.
- O.S. Sheet 83 - Caherciveen & Valentia.
- O.S. Sheet 84 - Kenmare River
- O.S. Sheet 85 - South Kerry, Bantry

=== Editions ===
- O.S. SCALE 1:126,720 Edition, published 1986 (Half Inch to One mile)
- Discovery Series, 3rd Edition, published 2005 (2 centimetres to 1 Kilometre)
- Discovery Series, 4th Edition, published 2010

== Key to column headings ==
- Structure

Listed as "Castle" or "Promontory Fort", markings of "Dun Cinn Tire" and "Signal Tower" are also included.

- O.S. Sheet

Refers to the Ordnance Survey sheet on which the structure can be found.

- N.G. Segment

National Grid segment in which the structure is located. Each grid segment covers an actual area of 1 square kilometre.

- V

The number of the Vertical, N-S, line of the National Grid system.

- H

The number of the Horizontal, E-W, line of the National Grid system. The structure to be located will then lie in the square to the North East of the intersecting H/V lines.

- Type
  - "Castle" - generally of Celtic or Norman construction
  - "Promontory Fort"- generally built about 1500 BC,
  - "Dun Cinn Tire" is the Irish language translation of "Promontory Fort"
  - "Signal Tower" - These are probably of Norman Construction
- Near

Some general reference point clearly marked on the map or generally, well known; a town, village, harbour, headland or road etc.

- Comment

Nearest main road or road, e.g. N 22 or R 559. If structure is easily accessible? Visibility of site from road.

- Marked

As some castles are obliterated, the location of the sites are listed, as in the case of Tralee Castle. Because their position and prominence was historically important, the known information is entered so that a more comprehensive understanding of the area and era may be obtained.

== Table ==
Structure	OS Sheet	N.G. Segment	Vert.	Horiz.	Type	Near	Comment	Marked Y/N
Dunquin	70	V	31	99	-	Dunquin	-	Y
Shrone Point	83	-	35	76	Prom Fort	Portmagee	Valentia Island	-
Raheen (near)	70	V	35	97	Prom Fort	Slea Head	R 559	-
Foilnanean Cliffs	83	-	36	76	Prom Fort	Portmagee	Valentia Island	-
Ventry Harbour	-	-	37	97	-	-	-	-
Cahertrant	70	V	37	97	Prom Fort	Leckeel	off R 559	-
Gallarus Castle	70	Q	38	5	-	Murreaght	R 559	-
Alachai Mor	83	-	38	65	Prom Fort	St. Finan's Bay	-	-
Cloghanecanuig	83	38	68	-	-	-	-	-
Ballymore Point	-	-	39	99	Prom Fort	Ventry Harbour	R 559	-
Feonanagh	70	-	40	9	-	-	-	-
Ballinskelligs Castle	-	-	43	65	-	Ballinskelligs	-	-
Cooncrome	83	-	43	81	Prom Fort	Caherciveen	-	-
Ballymacadoyle Hill	70	V	43	98	Prom Fort	Dingle	Beyond Colaiste Ide	Y
Ballycarbery Castle	83	-	44	79	-	Caherciveen	off N 70	-
Emiaghmore	83	-	45	70	-	Ballinskelligs	R 566	-
Beenbane Cliffs	70	V	45	98	Prom Fort	Dingle	E. harbour entrance	Y
Doonsheane	70	V	47	98	Prom Fort	Dingle	Short Strand Inlet	
Bulls Head	70	V	49	97	Prom Fort	Lispole	off N 86	-
Minard	70		53	97		Minard Head	Anascaul/Dingle	Y
Caherdaniel	83	-	54	58			off N 70	Example
Cill Muire	83	Example	54	58	Example	Minard East	Example	Example
Castle Cove	83	Example	59	60	Example	Castle Cove	N 70	Example
Straigue Fort	83	Example	61	63	Stone Fort	Caherdaniel	Example	Example
Kilshannig	71	Q	62	19	Signal Tower	Castlegregory	Example	Example
Knockglass More	71	Example	70	10	Prom Fort	Camp	Example	Example
Fenit Island	71	Q	72	17	Example	Fenit R 558	Example	Yes
Barrow	71	Q	72	18	Example	Golf Club	Example	Example
Caherconree	71	Q	72	96	Hill Fort	Camp R 560	Example	Yes
Ballyheige Fortification	71	Q	73	28	Example	Ballyheige	Example	Example
Rahoneen	71	Q	75	20	Example	Ardfert	Example	Example
Rathmoral	71	Q	79	29	Example	Ballyheige	Example	Example
Ballymaquim	71	Example	82	26	Example	Abbeydorney	Example	Example
Tralee castle	71	Example	83	14	Example	Town center	No trace	No
Dromaloughane	78	Example	85	91	Example	Beaufort	Example	Example
Ballybeggan	71	Example	86	15	Example	Tralee Racecourse	N 69	Example
Dromreag	71	Example	88	4	Example	Fieries	Example	Example
Lixnaw Tower	71	Example	88	29	Example	Lixnaw	R 557	Example
Kenmare Castle	78	V	88	70	Example	Tubrid	off N 70	Example
Dromore Castle	78	Example	88	91	Example	Beaufort	off N 72	Example
Doonimlaghbeg	71	Example	89	11	Example	Example	N 22	Example
Lixnaw Bridge	71	Example	89	29	Example	Lixnaw	R 557	Example
Fieries	Example	Example	90	2	Example	Example	R 561	Example
Roxborough	71	Example	91	4	Example	Farranfore	N 22	Example
Aghadoe Castle (Parkavonear Castle)	78	Example	93	92	Example	Example	R 562/ N 22	Example
Ross Castle	78	Example	94	88	Example	Killarney	Example	Example
Castlelough	78	Example	97	88	Example	Killarney	N 71	Example
Ardea Castle	Example	Example	Example	Example	Example	Example	Example	Example
Ballybunion Castle	Example	Example	Example	Example	Example	Example	Example	Example
Ballingarry Castle	Example	Example	Example	Example	Example	Example	Example	Example
Ballymalis Castle								
Ballyseedy Castle	Sheet	Sgmt	V	H		Tralee	Hotel	
