= Diarmuid Gavin =

Irish garden designer and television personality

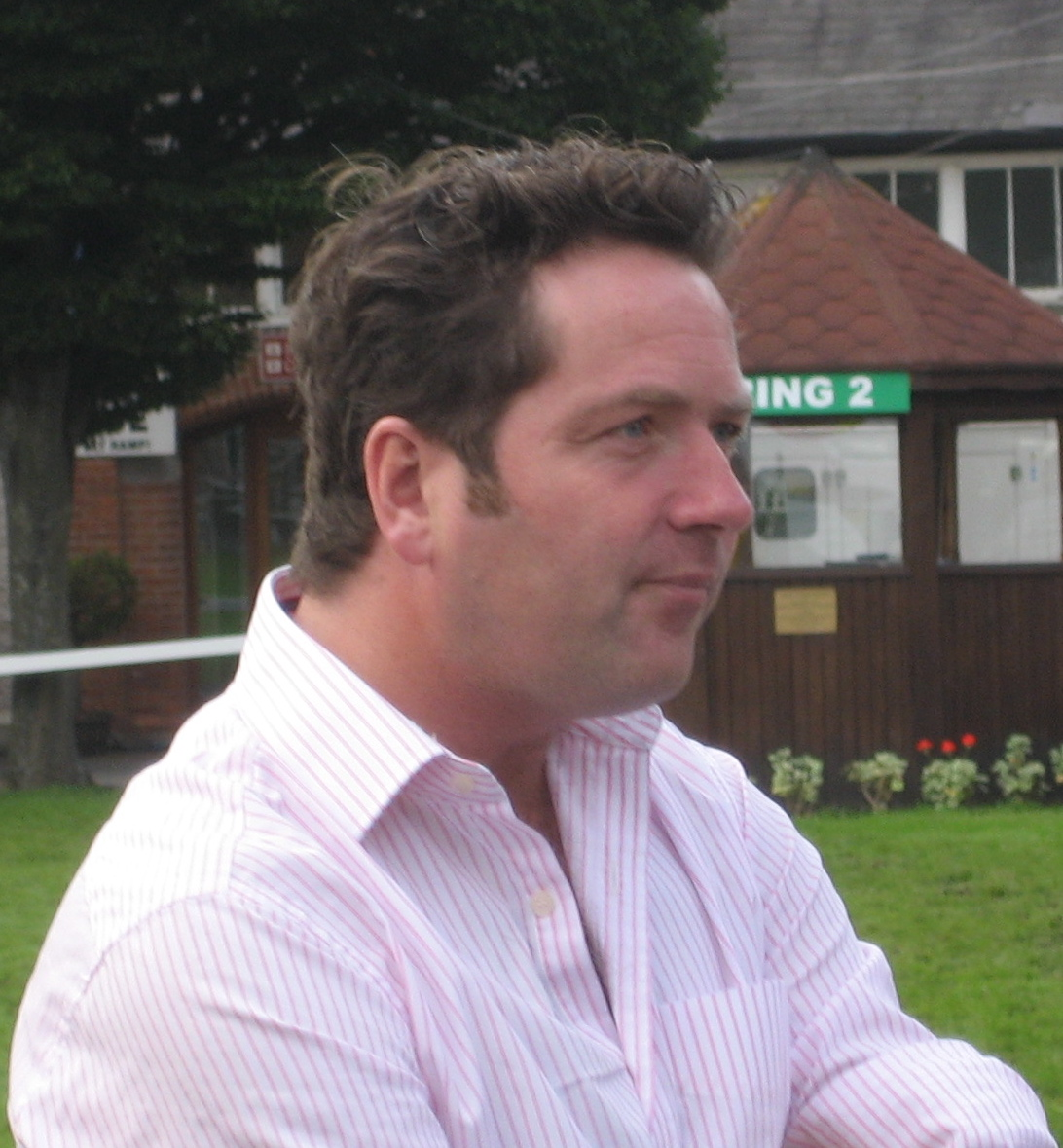
- Diarmuid Gavin at the Dublin Horse Show
- Born: 10 May 1964 (age 62); London, England
- Citizenship: British; Irish
- Education: Templeogue College; College of Amenity Horticulture
- Occupation: Garden designer
- Years active: 1988 to present
- Spouse: Justine Keane
- Children: 1
- Awards: Medals at Chelsea Flower Show
- Website: Official website

Diarmuid Gavin (born 10 May 1964) is an Irish garden designer and television personality. He has presented gardens at the Chelsea Flower Show on nine occasions from 1995 to 2016, winning a number of medals, including gold in 2011. He has also authored or co-authored at least ten gardening-related books.

== Early life ==
Gavin was born in London on 10 May 1964, to Irish parents, and brought to Ireland when he was a month old. He grew up in the Fairways development in Rathfarnham, a suburb of Dublin. When Gavin was six, his younger brother Conor was killed by a car while they were walking to school. He received his primary school education in St. Joseph's Boys National School in Terenure. He received his secondary education at Templeogue College; he recalls the subjects as being "horrifying," with the exception of art classes with a favourite teacher, Mr Weafer. He applied to the College of Amenity Horticulture at the Botanic Gardens in Glasnevin, Dublin, failing the first time, but securing entry three years later.

== Gardening career ==
Gavin started work with small jobs, the first, a suburban house garden featuring gravel and railway sleepers, in 1988, while he was studying at Glasnevin, still intact as of 2016. A notable early commission was for social columnist Terry Keane, a contract during which he also met his future wife.

=== Design and consulting ===
Gavin runs his own garden and landscape design business, with an office in London, and contact details in Ireland also. The enterprise launched its website in 2005, but after a refresh, the site has displayed a holding page since 2013. Gavin has designed many gardens in the UK and Ireland, and beyond, for commercial, public sector and private clients. In interviews he has mentioned projects primarily in the UK and China, that his work primarily involves travel, and that he has never yet been to Ireland's national flower show, Bloom. In particular the projects in China have tended to be large-scale and of long duration, involving a lot of time away from home, and limiting his work in Ireland and the UK.

=== Chelsea Flower Show ===
By the end of 2019, Gavin has participated in the Royal Horticultural Society's Chelsea Flower Show nine times, seven on the main avenue, the last having been 2016. His first Chelsea garden, in 1995, was inspired by the coastal gardens of Noelle Campbell-Sharp at Canuig House in Ballinskelligs, County Kerry. He discussed some of his garden concepts, and material sourcing, in his autobiographical volume. He entered again in 1996.

Gavin won a bronze medal in 1995, and a silver-gilt medal in 2004. In 2007, Gavin's Westland Garden, featuring recycled materials, also won a silver-gilt medal.

==== The Sky Garden, 2011 Gold medal ====
In May 2011 Gavin returned to Chelsea after a three-year gap, with his "Irish Sky Garden", which attracted funding of more than €1.7 million from Fáilte Ireland, the Irish tourism body, and was also supported by Cork City Council. Gavin described the garden as inspired by the Oscar-winning animator Richie Baneham (who drove visual effects for Avatar), as well as by the "suspended table" novelty restaurant concept, and by the Midsummer Festival of the Senses at Cork, the landscapes of Capability Brown, Charles Jencks and the some Italian Renaissance figures. The garden was built in an ovoid container suspended more than 25 metres above the ground. Twenty-five reflecting and flowing pools on the ground showcased the garden, which could be visited by show-goers in groups of up to eight. This garden won the gold medal at the show.

The Sky Garden attracted controversy when Cork City Council in Ireland agreed to put the garden on permanent display at Fitzgerald's Park in the Mardyke area of the city – at a cost of at least €300,000 to the cash-strapped council. The decision attracted widespread criticism including that of a number of Cork city councillors with Councillor Ted Tynan pointed out that there were over 500 boarded up local council houses in the city and demanded clarification from the council as to what the exact cost of the garden would be. In the end, the garden was not set up in its full form, but aspects of its design were used in a reworking of Fitzgerald's Park.

==== 2012 to present ====
Gavin participated again in Chelsea, on the main avenue, in 2012, 2013 and 2016. His 2016 garden, the British Eccentric's Garden, inspired by Heath Robinson and others, sponsored by Harrods, and planted with help from Helen Dillon and Carmel Duignan, won a silver gilt medal. He described the complexity of the preparation of the garden, which combined classic garden elements, buildings and mechanical animation, and involved planning and preparation over a year, and around 150 people. He did not participate in the 2017 Chelsea Flower Show, nor those of 2018 and 2019.

=== Patronage, promotional and charitable work ===
Gavin has been a patron at Southport Flower Show and many others. He became patron of the Royal Horticultural Society of Ireland in August 2019.

He has run several fundraising events for the Cill Rialaig Artists' Retreat.

Gavin has also participated in promotional work for Ireland's horticultural development board, Bord Glas, free of charge.

=== Work with retail ===
As of 2016, Gavin was offering a garden design service with Harrods of London.

In 2018, Dunnes Stores, Ireland's largest retail operator, announced an arrangement with Gavin, to launch events and special retail facilities on George's Street in Dublin, later expanding.

== Talks and courses ==
Gavin has presented many talks and lectures in both Ireland and the UK, and has also delivered courses on gardening and garden design.

== Television ==
=== Presenting ===
Gavin presented Surprise Gardeners, a Central TV (ITV) series, and also Virgin Gardeners for Channel 5. He presented or co-presented a number of BBC television programmes, including Gardeners' World and Home Front (Home Front Inside Out, Home Front in the Garden) with Laurence Llewelyn-Bowen, as well as Planet Patio and Art of the Garden (BBC2). In 2004, he presented Diarmuid's Big Adventure, and a Twofour and RHS production, Gardens Through Time. Homefront and Gardens Through Time both had accompanying books published.

RTÉ screened the television show I Want a Garden. In 2011, RTÉ launched Dirty Old Towns with Gavin as co-presenter, and a second series aired in 2012.

Gavin presented an episode of Great British Garden Revival on BBC Two in 2014.

In 2018, Gavin judged the Young Landscapers Award at the BBC Gardeners' World Live show.

==== Reality TV and guest appearances ====
In autumn 2004, Gavin participated in BBC One's Strictly Come Dancing and in summer 2006, Only Fools on Horses. In 2010, Gavin took part in the first series of the ITV reality competition 71 Degrees North and was the third celebrity to become eliminated on 21 September 2010.

On 12 December 2010, Gavin appeared on Channel 4 on a Christmas edition of Come Dine with Me with David Gest, Hannah Waterman and Sherrie Hewson.

In January 2013, Gavin was a participant in the first series of Splash!. Gavin was the fourth celebrity to be eliminated from the show, despite low scores on his first night.

On 8 October 2013, Gavin appeared as a guest on The Sarah Millican Television Programme on BBC, and on 9 October 2013, on the ITV game show Big Star's Little Star, with his daughter Eppie. On 14 December 2013, Gavin appeared on The Chase: Celebrity Special, and on 5 March 2014, he appeared in an episode of Sport Relief's Top Dog with his dog, Roxie.

On 8 September 2019 Gavin appeared on a Channel 5 edition of the Irish reality TV home improvement show Room to Improve.

Gavin appeared on Series 1 of The Apprentice UK, agreeing to donate a Suzuki 600 motorcycle to a charity auction.

== Awards ==
In addition to the Chelsea Flower Show medals mentioned, Gavin won an RDS Gold Award in 1991 and again in 1993.

In 2007, Gavin received an Honorary Degree of Doctor of Art from Nottingham Trent University in recognition of his international reputation for contemporary garden designs.

== Publications ==
Gavin is the author or co-author of 10 gardening and garden design books, released since 2000, some of which have sold very strongly, been released in multiple editions, and been translated to multiple other languages. His works include:

- Planet Patio: Stylish Outdoor Living, 2001
- Homefront in the Garden: inspirational designs and ideas from the cutting-edge BBC TV series, 2001, with Laurence Llewelyn-Bowen
- Homefront Inside Out: inspirational ideas for your home and garden from the BBC TV series, 2001, with Laurence Llewelyn-Bowen
- Diarmuid Gavin's Big Ideas, 2002
- Outer Space, 2003
- Design Your Garden, 2004, published in 3 languages
- Gardens Through Time: 200 years of the English garden, 2004, with Jane Owen
- Outdoors: the garden design book for the twenty-first century, 2007, with Terence Conran, published in 7 languages
- Planting: the planting design book for the twenty-first century, 2009, with Terence Conran, published in 5 languages
- The Extra Room: make your outdoor space work for you, 2016

Gavin also released an autobiographical volume, "How the Boy Next Door Turned Out: An Autobiography," in 2010.

== Personal life ==
Gavin is married to Justine Keane, daughter of Ronan Keane (a former Chief Justice of Ireland) and social columnist and fashion journalist Terry Keane, who separated in the 1990s. The Gavins have a daughter, Eppie, born December 2004.

The Gavins live, and Diarmuid manages their garden, near the village of Kilmacanogue, south of Dublin, in County Wicklow, Ireland. On the one third of an acre around the house, which he enhanced with beams from the former Jervis Street Hospital, he has ponds, a shed created from his Dundrum Town Centre pop-up shop, and items from some of his Chelsea Flower Show gardens.
