= Dromore Castle =

Dromore Castle may refer to:

- Dromore Castle (County Clare), near Ruan
- Dromore Castle (County Kerry), near Templenoe
- Dromore Castle (County Limerick), a ruined castle in Ireland near Pallaskenry
