= P.M. v District Judge Miriam Malone and the Director of Public Prosecutions =

Irish Supreme Court case

P. M. v. Malone
- Coat of arms of Ireland
- Court: Supreme Court of Ireland
- Decided: 7 June 2002
- Citation: [2002] IESC 46

Case history
- Appealed from: High Court of Ireland

Court membership
- Judges sitting: Keane C.J., McGuinness, Hardiman

Case opinions
- An inordinate delay and unusual circumstances led the Court to decide to stop the further prosecution of alleged sexual abuse.

Keywords
- Constitution of Ireland; Delay; Sexual abuse

P.M. v District Judge Miriam Malone and the Director of Public Prosecutions [2002] IESC 46 is an Irish Supreme Court case in which the court barred the further prosecution of a man (P.M., the appellant) for the alleged sexual abuse of his sister due to the nature of the offences and on the grounds of the pre-charge delay in criminal prosecution. A "inordinate" delay of seven years before the man was charged, coupled with the nature of the offences being described as "a form of sexual experimentation between two children under the age of ten" led to the decision of the court.

== Background ==
The appellant was nine years old when the "sexual experimentation" began with his sister, who was aged seven at the time. This carried on until shortly after the appellant reached the age of adult responsibility. In 1991, the appellant's mother expressed concern that her youngest daughter (J), then aged three, might have been sexually abused by the appellant. A social worker and psychologist reported their findings of these accusations to the Garda Síochána (the police) in January 1992. The appellant's sister (the complainant) was reluctant to make a complaint until April 1998, but decided to do so eventually out of concern for her younger sister (J). The complainant "made it clear that the only reason she made a complaint in 1992, and again in 1998, was because of her concern that the [appellant] might have been abusing her younger sister." The appellant was not charged until 25 May 1999.

The case was brought to the High Court in 2002, where the granting of an order preventing further prosecution of the appellant was refused. During the High Court hearing the DPP decided not to proceed with charges that occurred before the appellant was fourteen years old, as Irish law at the time did not recognise that a male under that age was capable of sexual intercourse. The DPP proceeded with all other charges. The High Court judge noted that

The fact that a young person commits a crime and delay occurs does not of itself per se confer immunity from prosecution. If the delay does not occur through any fault of the State and is explicable and reasonable from the point of view of the alleged victim and if the accused's ability to defend himself is not so impaired that [there] would be a real and serious risk of an unfair trial, then the trial should go ahead. In this case I find no reason why the trial should be prohibited.

The appellant appealed to the Supreme Court.

== Holding of the Supreme Court ==
Keane CJ delivered the only written judgment for the Supreme Court (with which the other judges agreed). The court stated that a period of "inordinate delay" existed in the seven-year period from when the Garda Síochána were aware of the allegations in 1992 until 25 May 1999 when the man was charged. The nature of the offences were described as "a form of sexual experimentation between two children under the age of ten and continued for a relatively short time after the applicant had reached the stage at which, in the eyes of the law, his actions attracted the same degree of criminal responsibility as adults." It was also noted that the alleged activities did not cause the appellant's sister to suffer significant long-term psychological damage, according to a psychologists' report.

Mr Justice Keane also noted the "bewildering contradiction" between the statement of the appellant, in which it was stated that sexual intercourse continued with his sister until she was nineteen years of age, and the statement of the appellant's sister, in which it was stated that the alleged activity ceased when she was twelve years old. Emphasising the importance of a speedy trial, the court concluded:

I am satisfied that, in this case, the nature of the offences with which the [appellant] is now charged coupled with the inordinate and wholly unjustifiable delay in bringing them to trial renders this a case in which the constitutional right of the applicant to a reasonably expeditious trial outweighs any conceivable public interest there might be in the prosecution of the alleged offences.

The court allowed the appeal and substituted the High Court's order for an order prohibiting the DPP from proceeding with the prosecution.
