= Helen Dillon =

Scottish and Irish gardener and media personality

Helen Dillon (born 1940 in Dunning, Perth and Kinross), is a Scottish and Irish gardener, garden designer and lecturer, and media personality, who operated one of Ireland's most-visited private gardens for 44 years.

== Life ==
Dillon grew up in the small village of Dunning in Perthshire, Scotland, where she gardened from an early age.

== Career ==
Dillon later moved to London, and worked for a time for Amateur Gardening magazine, where she met gardeners and garden designers, and as an antiques dealer. She moved to Dublin when she married fellow antiques dealer Val Dillon.

=== The Dillon Garden ===
The Dillons managed one of Ireland's most-visited private gardens on a one-acre site behind a Georgian terraced house on Sandford Road in Ranelagh, an inner southern suburb of Dublin, from 1972 to 2016. The garden was named by one of the UK's leading gardeners, Christopher Lloyd, in his book Other People's Gardens, and is listed in other reference works. However Dillon did comment on the challenges of building up the garden, especially around aging of the soil, and the pests and diseases which tend to develop in older garden environments, including weevils, fungal rust, and persistent weeds.

After the Ranelagh property sold for over 4.5 million euro, and the Dillons moved on in September 2016, they relocated to Seafield Road, Monkstown, where a new garden was announced in 2018, opening for group visits, and with plans for classes.

=== Media ===
Dillon has presented The Garden Show, Garden Heaven (which also featured Dermot O'Neill), and Antiques Watch for RTÉ, Ireland's national State broadcaster. She also co-presented Greatest Gardens for the BBC, with Diarmuid Gavin.

Dillon and her garden appeared on television, and the developing new garden was also featured on Gardeners' World, and was mentioned on Radio Ulster's Gardeners Corner, in 2017.

=== Lecturing and design ===
Dillon has designed gardens over more than twenty years, including work on the garden at Kiltinan Castle, Fethard, Co Tipperary, for Andrew Lloyd Webber, for the American Embassy in Dublin, and on Roy and Patty Disney's garden in County Cork.

She has participated in plant-hunting expeditions in New Zealand, parts of South America, Nepal, China, and South Africa.

Dillon has lectured in Ireland, the UK, the US and Canada, Australia and New Zealand.

== Publishing ==
Dillon has written a range of books and articles on gardening and garden-related design.

=== Books ===
- The Flower Garden; Conran Octopus, London
- In an Irish Garden, co-editor with Sybil Connolly; Weidenfeld & Nicolson, London
- Garden Artistry; Macmillan, London
- Helen Dillon on Gardening, TownHouse, Dublin, 1998

=== Press ===
Dillon wrote a gardening column for the Sunday Tribune in the early 1990s. She has also written for The Garden, the magazine of the Royal Horticultural Society.

== Recognition ==
In 1999, Dillon received a gold Veitch Memorial Medal from the Royal Horticultural Society, and in 2003, a Medal of Honor from the Massachusetts Horticultural Society.

She is a Distinguished Counselor to the New York Botanical Garden Board of Trustees.

== External sources ==
- Official website of the new Dillon Garden in Monkstown
