= Ballinskelligs Abbey =

Ruined Augustinian abbey in County Kerry, Ireland

Coordinates: 51°48′55″N 10°16′19″W

Ballinskelligs Priory
- Prioreacht Bhaile an Sceilg (Irish)
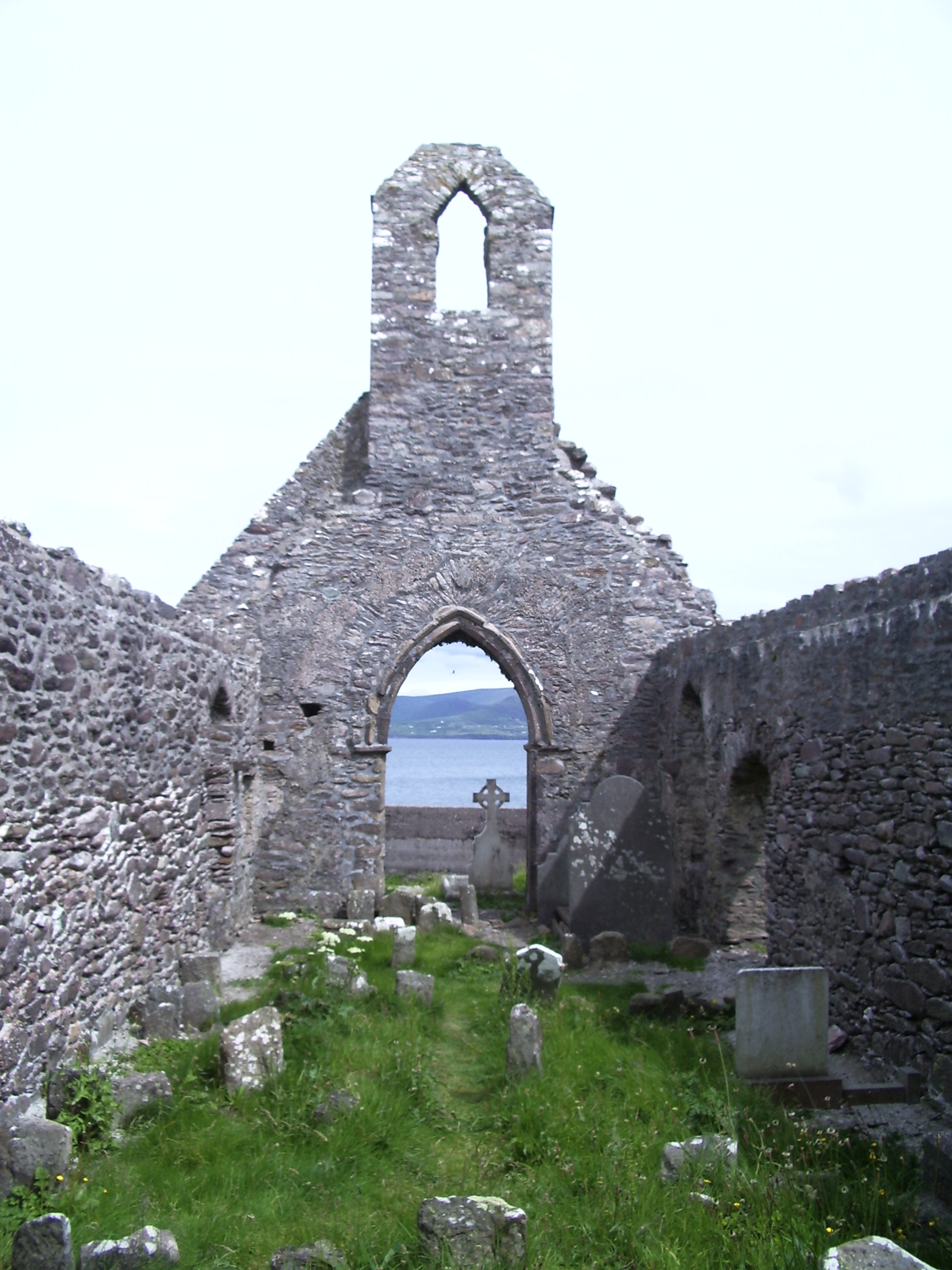
- Ruins of Ballinskelligs Priory.
- Interactive map of Ballinskelligs Priory

Ballinskelligs Abbey (Irish: Prioreacht Bhaile an Sceilg) was an Augustinian priory, (also known as the Priory of the Arroasian Canons of the Order of St Augustine). It is located on the Iveragh Peninsula in County Kerry, Ireland. The medieval priory, built in the 12 and 13th centuries, was established as a mainland priory for the monks of Skellig Michael who were abandoning the island due to adverse weather conditions. The ruined medieval site originally consisted of church, cloister, Prior's house, refectory, and burial ground.

== Description ==
Ballinskelligs Priory is located on the western shore of Ballinskelligs Bay, on the Iveragh Peninsula in County Kerry. The priory buildings contain architectural details from the 13th century to the 15th century. The church and other ruined structures are arranged around a central cloister. A building known as the ‘Prior’s House’ is connected to the church at an angle to the nave. Southwest of the church is the refectory.

The rectangular church consists of the nave and the remains of the chancel. The chancel has a pointed arched wall with a small bellcote. The church was built with roughly coursed rubble set in a lime and gravel mortar. There is evidence on the interior walls that the church was once plastered. Three doorways in the nave at the south west end, provide access to the cloister area. There is a blocked central doorway which partially covers the remains of an ogee-headed window. There are also damaged and fragmentary remains of the cloister. Inside the Prior’s House are remains from the church: portions of an ogee headed window, large drainage stones, and pieces from an arched doorway.

Due to its proximity to the shoreline, erosion by the sea has destroyed a large portion of the eastern edge of the medieval complex. Conservation work on the priory has been carried out along with the building of a sea-wall to protect the remaining ruins. Two other monuments adjacent to the priory complex include a burial site that is now in the sea at the eastern border of the site and the remains of an ancient settlement to the northwest of the abbey. There are ten tombs in different states of disrepair and over 200 gravestones in the graveyard, several in the church interior. The site is a protected national monument.

== History ==
The priory, also known as the Priory of the Arroasian Canons of the Order of St Augustine, was built between 1210 and 1225 by the Augustinian Canons from Rattoo, near Ballyduff, County Kerry. The Skellig Michael monastery is believed to have transferred to this location before the mid-11th century due to continuously hazardous weather conditions on the island. The new priory was dedicated to St. Michael the Archaangel. The priory retained ownership of Skellig Michael and used the island monastery as a summer retreat.

The priory was occupied until 1568 and was disbanded in 1578 during the reign of Elizabeth I. The property was granted to Gyles Clincher in 1578, and subsequently leased to consecutive tenants over the next two hundred years. Richard Harding became the landowner in 1756. He bequeathed Ballinskellings manor, the abbey and surrounding lands to his daughter's betrothed, Christopher Sigerson, after his daughter died before their wedding day. The abbey and manor stayed in the Sigerson family until after 1902, when Harold Sigerson Mahony (1867–1905) of Dromore Castle inherited the property. Mahony, a talented Irish tennis player and singles winner at Wimbledon in 1896, died in a bicycle accident in 1905. His estate was inherited by his sister, Norah Hood, and subsequently bequeathed to the Waller family.

== See also ==
- Skellig Islands
- Killagha Abbey
- Inisfallen Abbey

== Gallery ==
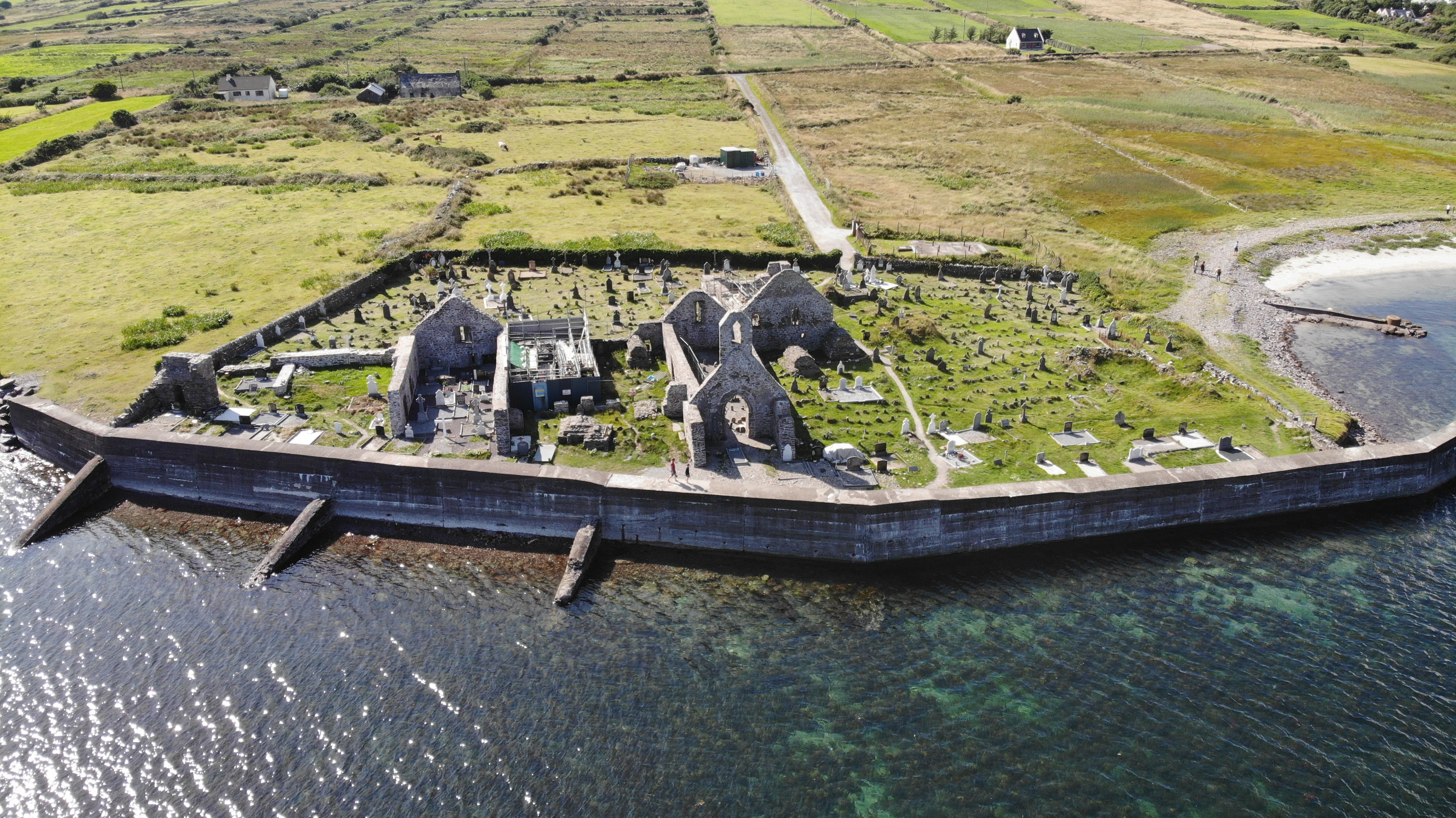
View from above

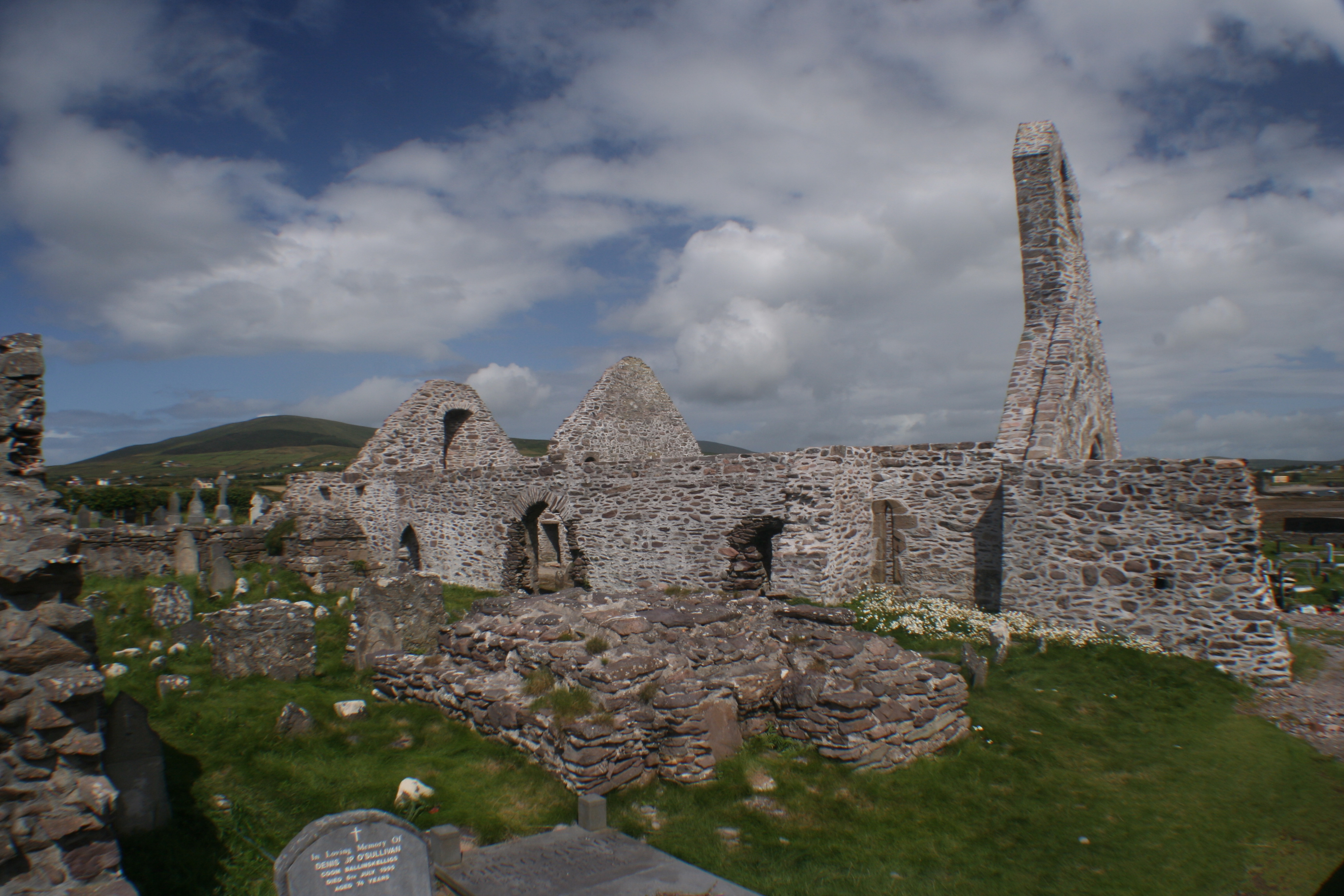
Abbey ruins

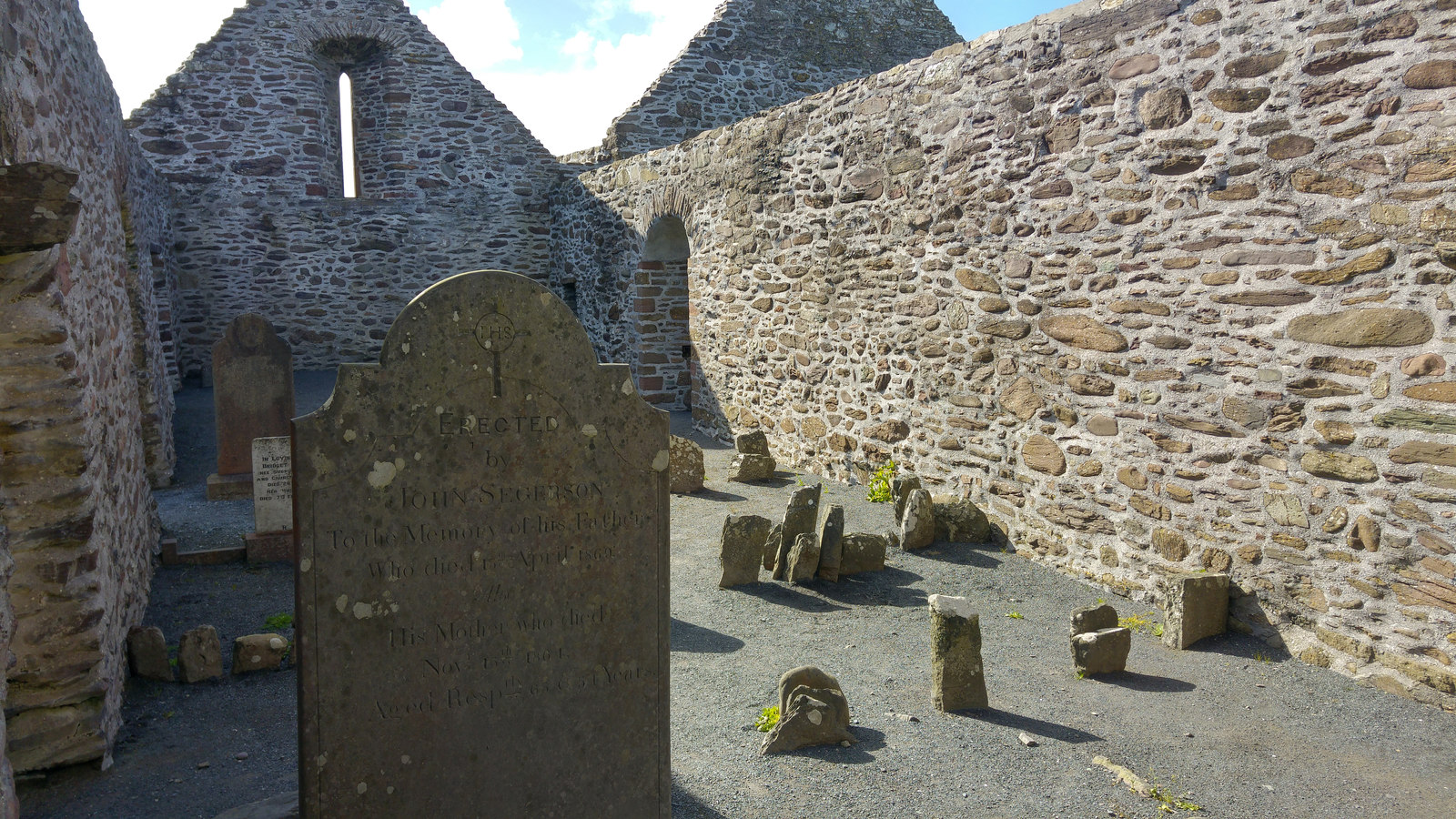
Abbey interior

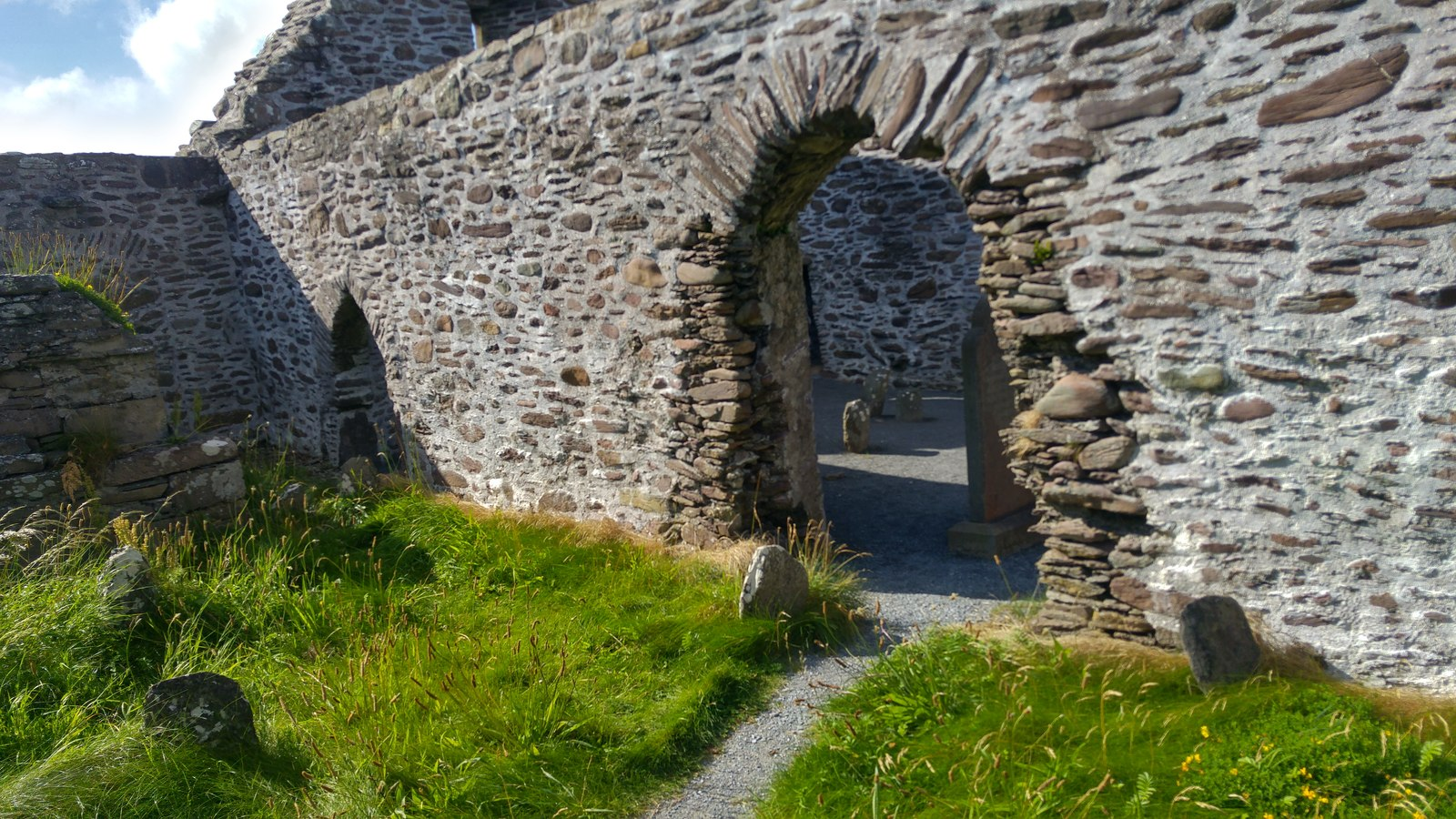
View of south wall

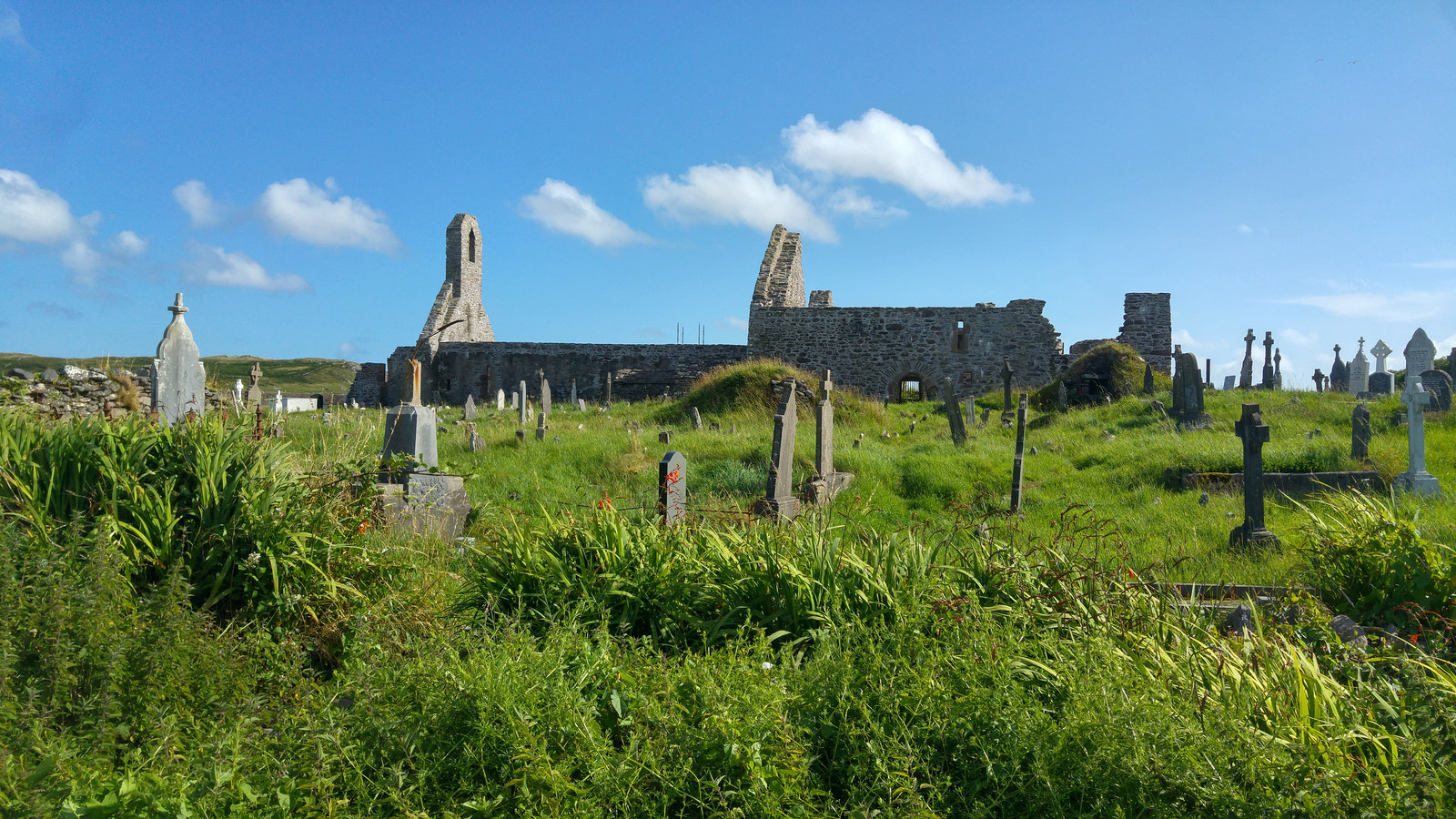
Abbey burial ground
