= Ruan, County Clare =

Village in County Clare, Ireland

Ruan An Ruán
- Village
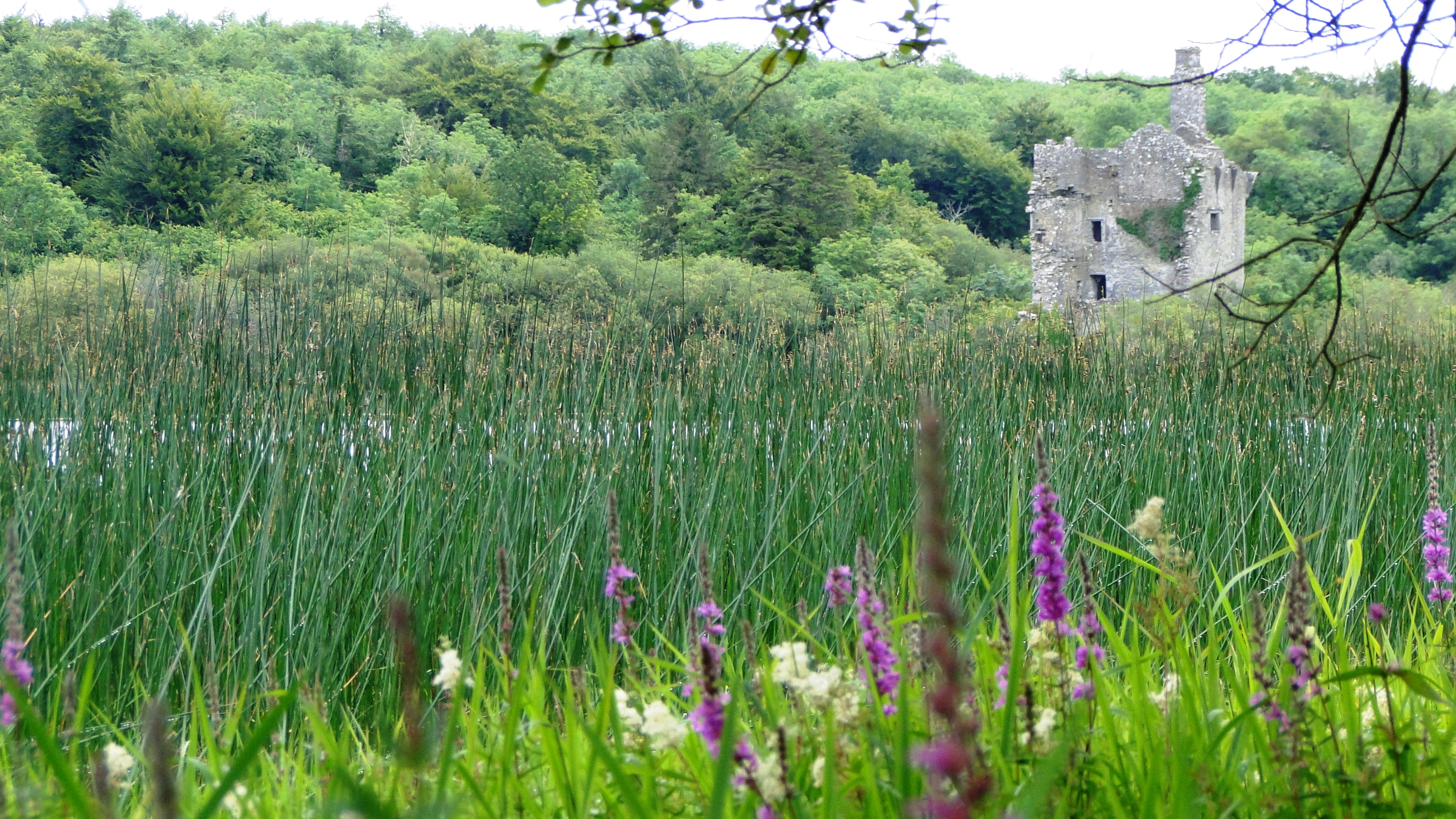
- Dromore Castle

- Location in Ireland
- Coordinates: 52.92926°N 8.990326°W
- Country: Ireland
- Province: Munster
- County: County Clare
- Time zone: UTC+0 (WET)
  - Summer (DST): UTC-1 (IST (WEST))
- Irish Grid Reference: R330871

Ruan (Irish: An Ruán, meaning 'reddish land') is a village and civil parish in County Clare, Ireland. It is in the Catholic parish of Dysart and Ruan.

== Location ==
Ruan is near the Burren and between Corofin, Crusheen and Ennis. Ennis is the nearest major town, 10 km to the south. The name Ruan (An Ruadhán) is an old Irish term for the alder tree, at one time used to make red dye. The parish contains Dromore Lake. Dromore wood is a wildlife sanctuary, with diverse flora and fauna including badgers, pine martens, squirrels and foxes. There are two self-guiding nature trails. The five lakes of Dromore are rich in fish.

Ruan contains the parish church of St Mary's. The church's spire caught fire and collapsed after a lightning strike in December 2024. The Catholic parish of Dysart and Ruan has its parish office in Ruan. In 1977 a new school was opened on the outskirts of Ruan village, and the old school became a Community Hall used for indoor sports and social events.

== History ==
In 1837 fairs were held twice yearly at Ruan. The sheep fair of 26 September was one of the most important in the county. At that time the villages of Ruan and Dysert each held a police station and each had a public school, educating about 660 children in all.

Ruan railway station on the West Clare line opened in 1888 and closed on 1 October 1921. Early in the morning of 18 October 1920 Ruan barracks was attacked by 32 men of the Irish Republican Army (IRA) Mid-Clare Brigade. One member of the Royal Irish Constabulary (RIC) was killed and two wounded. The IRA men captured 15 rifles and 14 revolvers.

== Notable people ==
- Mary Francis Bridgeman, nun and nurse
- Cyril Lyons, hurler
- Sharon Shannon, accordion-player and traditional Irish musician
- Jimmy Smyth, hurler

== Townlands ==
The civil parish contains the townlands of Addroon, Ballaghboy, Ballyharraghan, Ballymacrogan East, Ballymacrogan West, Ballyteige East, Ballyteige West, Ballyogan Beg, Ballyogan More, Bealickania, Bealnalicka, Caherlough, Cahermacrea, Cloonfeaghra, Cloonnagloghaun, Cooga, Dromeen, Dromore, Drumcavan, Foilrim, Garvillaun, Gorteen, Gregmoher, Kilkee East, Kilkee West, Killeen, Lisduff, Lisheenvicknaheeha, Lismuinga East, Lismuinga West, Lissyline, Loughaunnaweelaun, Moymore, Moyree Commons, Nooan, Ooankeagh, Portlecka, Ranaghan, Rathcahaun, Rathvergin, Rinelea, Rinneen, Ruan Commons, Teermulmoney, Teernea, Teernea Commons, Tonlegee, Toormore, Tullymackan and Tullyodea.

== See also ==
- List of towns and villages in Ireland
