= Noelle Campbell-Sharp =

Irish arts philanthropist, gallerist and former journalist and publisher

Dr (hon. caus.) Noelle Campbell-Sharp
- Born: 1943 (age 82–83); County Wexford
- Other name: Noelle Roche
- Citizenship: Ireland
- Occupations: Philanthropist, gallerist, publisher, former journalist
- Organization: Cill Rialaig Project
- Known for: Cill Rialaig Project
- Spouse: Neil Campbell-Sharp (divorced)
- Children: 1

Noelle Campbell-Sharp (born 1943 in County Wexford) is an Irish artistic promoter, gallerist and philanthropist, formerly a journalist, editor and publisher of multiple Irish magazine titles. She has operated an art gallery in Dublin, been a member of the Arts Council of Ireland, and has led the Cill Rialaig project in County Kerry, which has hosted more than 5,000 artists since its establishment in 1991.

== Life ==
Campbell-Sharp was born in 1943 in Wexford, and was given away at birth, with IEP£100 to be fostered as a Catholic, and then adopted by the Roche family, growing up in County Wexford. She has described how her mother had run away to Northern Ireland, became pregnant at 20 with an American partner, and later built a career in a medical field in the UK. She researched her birth background, and while her mother died before they could meet, she became acquainted with a half-brother and two half-sisters, and other relatives.

Roche acquired a love of history and military matters from her father, and went on to collect memorabilia related to Napoleon. She left school at the age of 15, after taking her Intermediate Certificate.

== Career ==
=== Early career ===
Roche secured an invoice clerk-typist job with a foundry and agricultural machinery company, Pierce's, in Wexford. She moved to Dublin, attended the Brendan Smith Academy of Acting and acted with the Young Dublin Players, and based on that secured a role as a Public Relations Officer for the Gaiety Theatre, with her first client being Peter O'Toole.

=== Journalism ===
After her marriage to British fashion photographer Neil Campbell-Sharp, she began to write text to go with his work, and later to manage his career, and so became involved with fashion journalism. The marriage ended some years later.

=== Publishing ===
Campbell-Sharp began to work with Irish Tatler magazine, buying it out in 1979, using a company established with Kilkenny People editor, John Kerry Keane. She shortened Irish Tatler's working title to IT, and edited it until 1988. She also purchased a number of other titles, publishing 11 at one point, including Social and Personal, which she later sold to Michael Smurfit's Smurfit Publishing, and Success. She also published Ryanair's in-flight magazine for some years, and later won a legal action to retain that contract. Additionally her publishing company won a contract to publish a magazine for Ryanair's frequent target of criticism, Aer Rianta.

Campbell-Sharp sold her magazine business to Robert Maxwell, 51% in 1989, and 49% in 1991, to be bought out over five years. His death, and the unravelling of his business, left her without the balance of the sale price, a loss she estimated at £10 million. Her partner at that time, musician Niall McGuinness, brother of U2’s manager Paul McGuinness, died suddenly about a year later, aged 39.

With her main residence in Killiney, she purchased a property in the coastal area of Ballinskelligs in County Kerry in the late 1980s, having it renovated under architect Alfred Cochrane. She was very active on the Dublin social scene, and became friends with Terry Keane. She took a legal action over reporting, against Hugh Leonard and Independent News and Media, being awarded £70,000 and costs of over £100,000 in 1997. She secured a nomination for election to the board of directors of Bank of Ireland in 1992 but failed to be elected. She also managed a rock band, Against the Storm, in 1994–1995.

=== Cill Rialaig Project ===
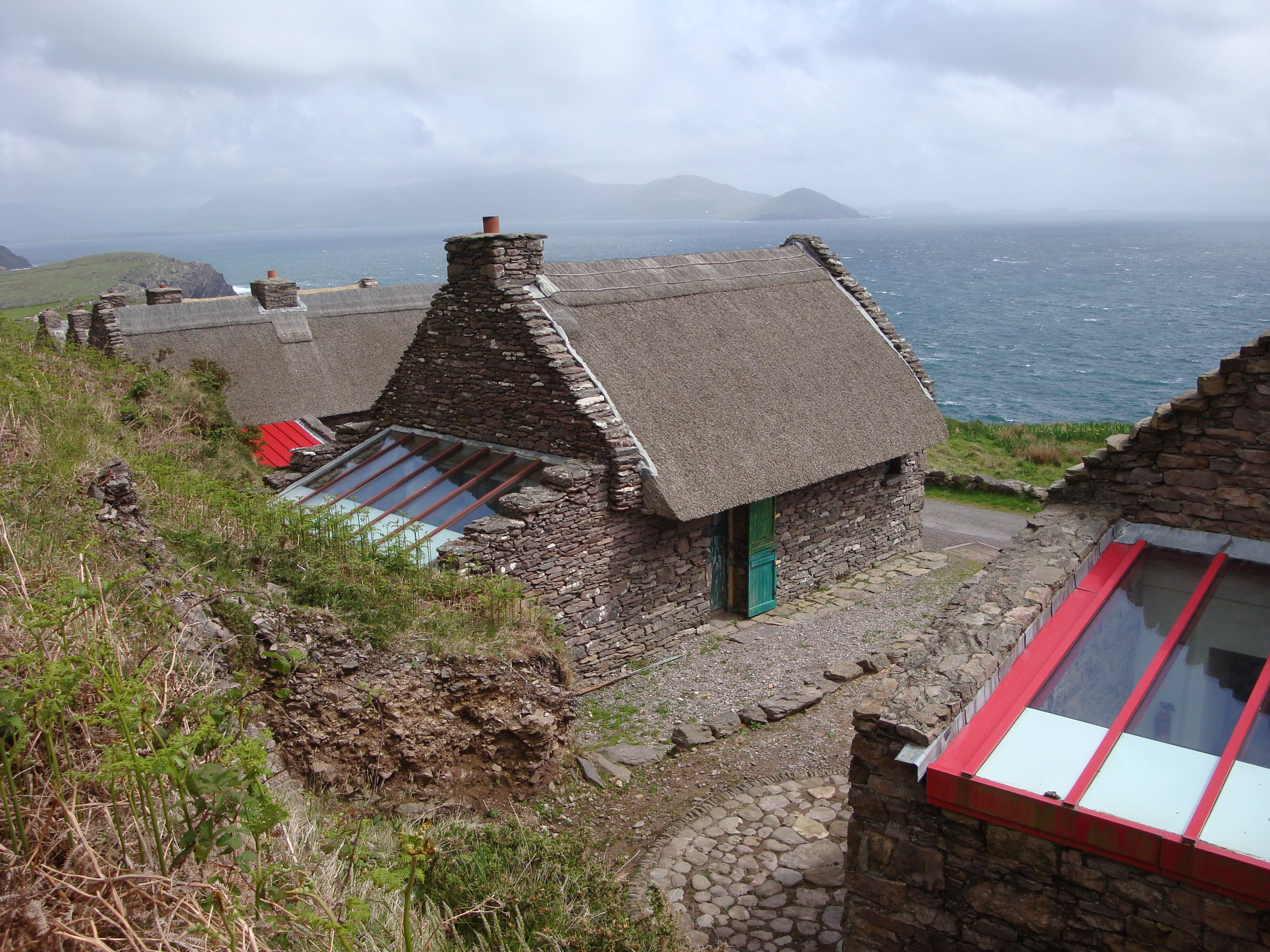
Cill Rialaig Artist Village, Cottage No7 (viewed from the above/rear - looking out into the bay), Ballinskelligs, about 17, May 2011

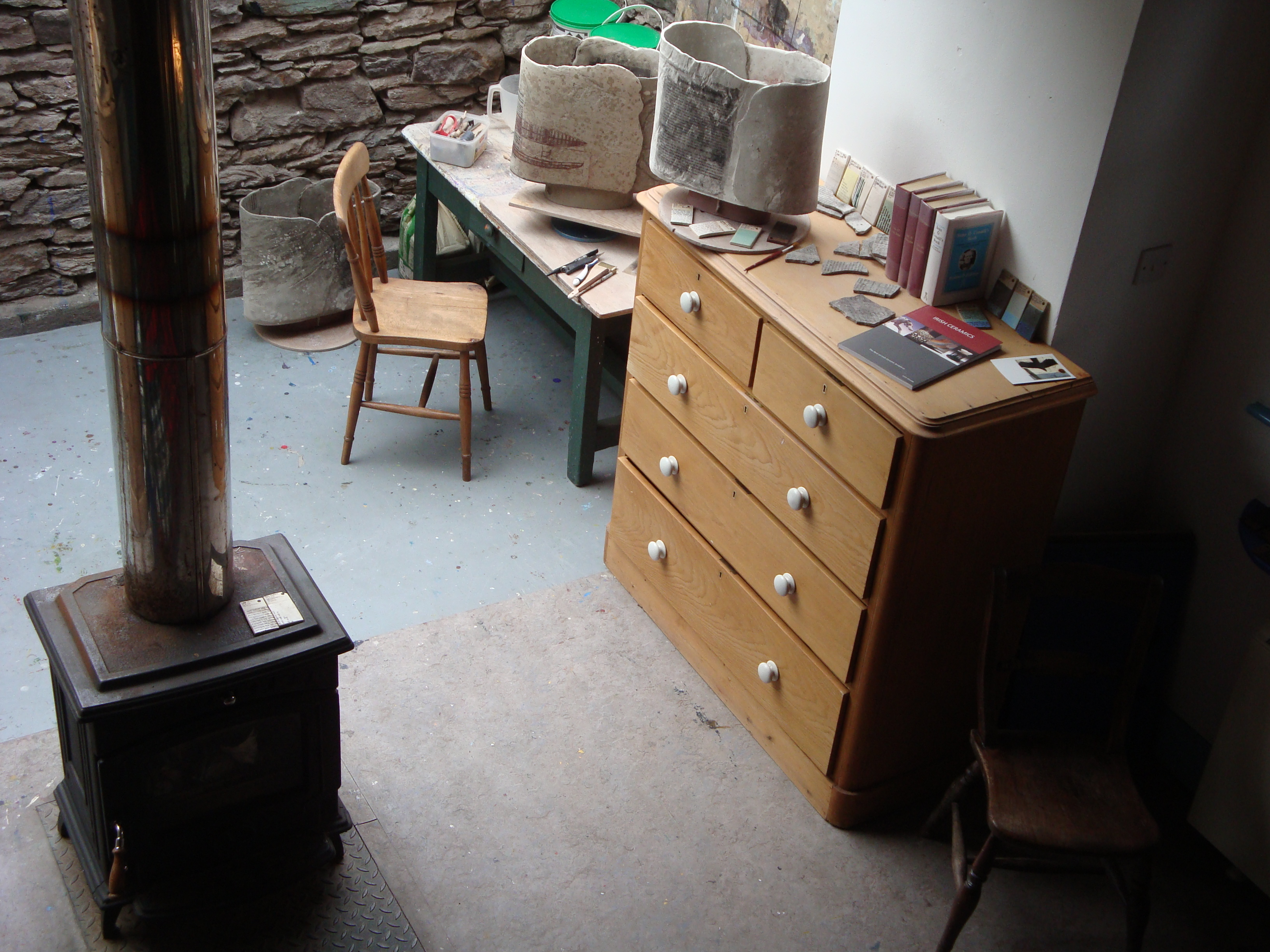
Cill Rialaig Artist Residency Village, County Kerry - Studio Interior 2, Cottage No7; about 17, May 2011 (with ceramic work in progress; leather-hard vessels on worktops and one on floor - Oratory Vessels I, II & IV; test-tiles, tools, books)

Having heard of a risk of a road widening project destroying famine village remnants at Cill Rialaig in Ballinskelligs, she organised fund-raising with some local and Dublin-based friends, and a small grant from the Irish National Lottery, purchased the ruins, and commenced what grew into the multi-part Cill Rialaig Project, an Artist Retreat and nearby Arts Centre. She later sold her Killiney house and made Ballinskelligs her main base, and she continued as the driving force of this project, which has hosted over 5,000 artists on residencies as of mid-2019.

Campbell-Sharp launched her first gallery, on St. Stephen's Green, dedicated to work from Cill Rialaig – this was opened by the Tánaiste Dick Spring, with the Ambassador of the US, Jean Kennedy Smith in attendance. This was followed by the Origins Gallery, which began on Harcourt Street, then had to move due to Luas building works, reopening on Fitzwilliam Street Lower, and which is being reworked in 2019. For a time, from 2006 to the early 2010s, Campbell-Sharp also operated the Urban Retreat gallery on Hanover Quay, by Grand Canal Dock. focused on Cill Rialaig's output and artists.

== Recognition ==
Campbell-Sharp received an honorary doctorate from the National University of Ireland, Maynooth, in June 2007, conferred by Garret FitzGerald.

== Arts Council ==
Campbell-Sharp was appointed as a member of Ireland's 13-member Arts Council in 2003 by Minister John O'Donoghue.

== Personal life ==
Campbell-Sharp has one daughter with Neil Campbell-Sharp. Married to avant garde photographer Bernhardt von Spreckelsen, holistic therapist Tara has three children, born within a three-year span.

Campbell-Sharp was an active collector of Napoleon-related memorabilia, and member of the Napoleon Society of Ireland, for decades, but in 2019 announced plans to auction off her collection.
