= Cill Rialaig =

Artist retreat and art centre, County Kerry, Ireland

Cill Rialaig is a contemporary arts project, comprising the Cill Rialaig Artist Retreat and the Cill Rialaig Arts Centre with exhibition and retail facilities, founded by Noelle Campbell-Sharp in 1991 and managed by a registered charity. The operations are located a few kilometres apart, in the townlands of Cill Rialaigh and Dún Geágaín within the broad area of Ballinskelligs, on Bolus Head, County Kerry, Ireland. Since opening, the retreat has hosted more than 5,000 painters, writers, photographers, potters, composers, choreographers, and other artists, from a wide range of countries, on residencies. The project has been supported by prominent patrons, local and Dublin-based committees, representative art galleries in Dublin, and Irish state bodies such as Údarás na Gaeltachta, FÁS and the Arts Council.

== History ==
=== Beginnings ===
The first stage of what became a multi-phase project was the Cill Rialaig Artist Retreat, founded by Noelle Campbell-Sharp, a former magazine publisher also active on Dublin's social scene. Campbell-Sharp, who had a holiday home in the area, was aware of a ruined 18th century village on Bolus Head on the Iveragh Peninsula in western County Kerry, which was threatened by a potential road-widening scheme, and proposed its reconstruction and dedication as a retreat for creative workers, including painters, photographers, composers and writers, from Ireland or elsewhere, to spend some quiet time in which to continue, or refresh, their work. The village had lost its last occupant in the 1950s, and the buildings were a mix of wholly disassembled and semi-collapsed.

Campbell-Sharp established a voluntary board, supported by a local golf committee, and social, wine appreciation and art auction committees in Dublin. She purchased the site for 30,000 pounds, with some of her own funds and support from friends (including Tony Ryan, Renata Coleman, Oliver Caffery and John O'Connor), and 6,000 pounds from the Irish National Lottery, and explained that she wanted to leave an enduring resource for the local people. She then applied for and secured planning permission for eight buildings.

During the early part of the development, she moved to the area to supervise, selling her home in Killiney, Dublin.

The project was planned and overseen by architect Alfred Cochrane. The foundation stone was laid by the Taoiseach, Charles Haughey, honorary patron of the project, on Saturday 21 September 1991. Other early patrons included John Bruton, John Hume and Dick Spring, as well as Bill Cullen, and support was given by Údarás na Gaeltachta and FÁS.

=== First phase ===
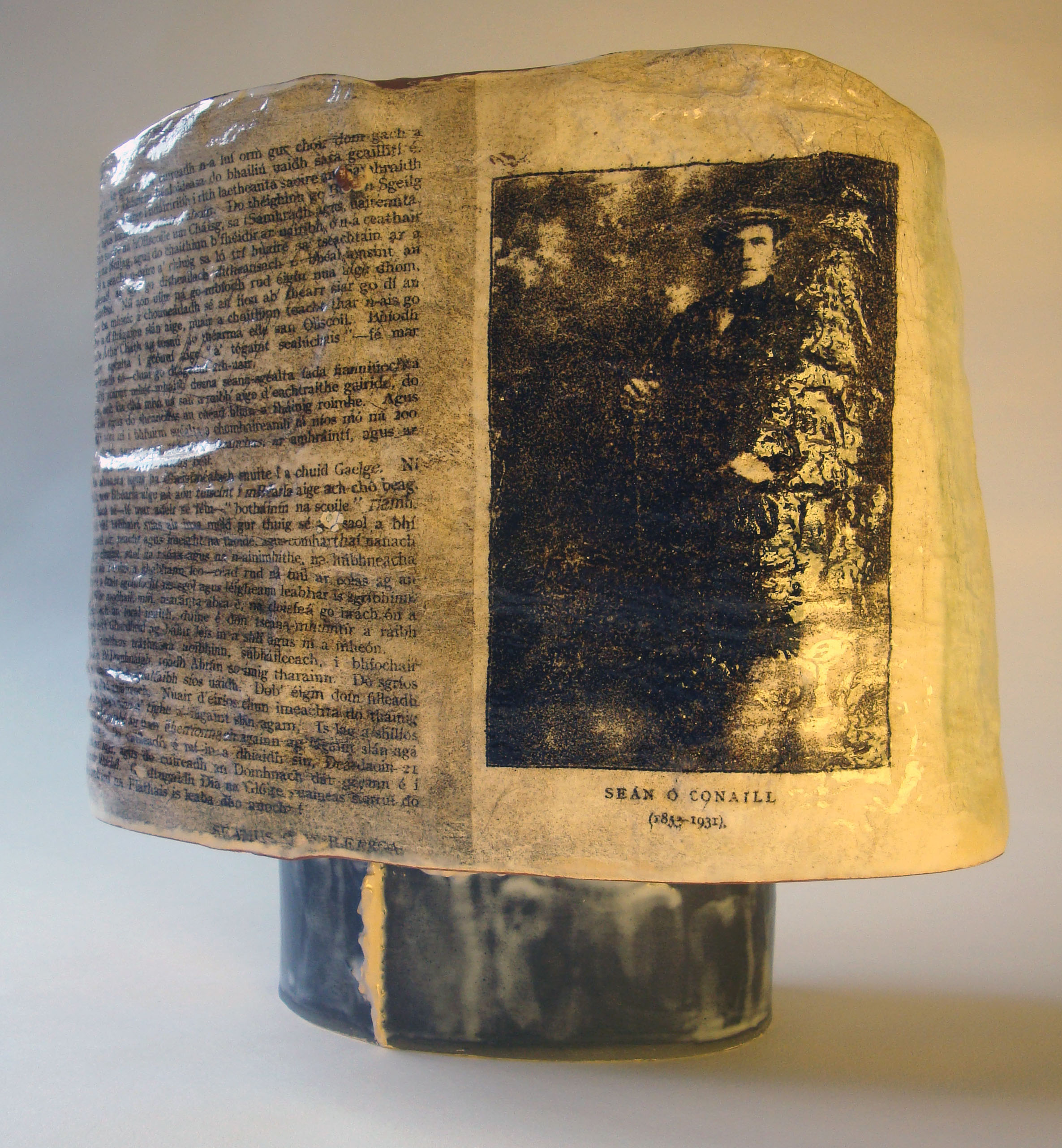
Seán Ó Conaill (The Gaelic storyteller [1853-1931] of Cill Rialaig) - Ceramic Story Vessel IV, Cill Rialaig Artist Residency October 13-20, 2011, (from an idea suggested by Noelle Campbell-Sharp) a_morley@outlook.com

Work began with the construction of modern buildings on the sites of long-gone cabins, first two, at a cost of 50,000 Irish pounds each, then two more, then another, and two more later again. While made externally to conform to the pattern of the original houses, and reusing stone from the site, the new buildings were built with damp-proofing and insulation, small bathrooms, modern cooking facilities and storage heating, loft sleeping spaces, and concealed central skylights over the main studio work space. There were some questions about the project but much support from both artistic and local interests. The first two houses were ready in 1995. By 1998, still with two studio-cabins available, 180 artists had completed residencies, and by 2001, 600.

The conversation house and library was dedicated by President of Ireland Mary McAleese in 2008, to the memory of historic local storyteller (seannachai) Seán Ó Conaill. See: Seán Ó Conaill’s Book: Stories and Traditions from Iveragh, translated from Gaelic by Máire MacNeill (1981)

By 2011, 2500 artists had visited, and as of mid-2019, over 5,000.

=== Second phase ===
The arts centre and shop, originally branded as Siopa Chill Rialaig (Cill Rialaig Shop) opened in 1995, in the nearby village of Dun Geagan, partly to raise funds, but also to provide a location for the public, local and passing, to view and acquire art, and take part in workshop art classes. Children are particularly welcome to the Saturday workshops.

=== Third phase plans ===
A plan for an international art gallery, part-inspired by Tate St Ives in Cornwall, has been under consideration for the nearby Waterville area since at least 1998.

== Artist retreat ==
Guests have included painters, writers, photographers, potters, composers, choreographers and dancers, and other artists. The retreat deliberately does not have a website but is briefly summarised on the website of the arts centre. Its buildings are located along a narrow road deep into Bolus Head, near a cliff overlooking the Atlantic Ocean, and remote from other habitation. There are seven self-catering studio cottages with natural roof lighting, six on the inland side of the road, one, Seaside Cottage, on the coastal side, overlooking the near-cliff like descent to the sea. There is also a meeting house and library (Tig an Comhra, literally "house of conversation"), which has no electricity but is lit by candles, and a utility building.

It is the policy of the project to offer its accommodation free of charge, except for a contribution to utility costs; guests buy their own food, and, if wished, solid fuel for the cottage furnaces. Some specific residencies, such as those of the Irish Writer's Centre, cover the utility fee also. Guests are usually under no obligations, although gatherings in studios or the Tig an Comhra are common, and at the Tig an Comhra local people, storytellers and musicians, also visit. The stated ethos of the retreat is of isolation and "eremitic-like" living.

As of 2019, more than 5,000 residencieshave been hosted, with artists coming from Ireland, the UK, Russia and other European countries, Japan, Korea, China, the US, Canada and Mexico, India, Australia and New Zealand. In 2014, a whole team of Argentine artists (made up of painters, writers and musicians) landed in Bolus Head and stayed in August, marking the first time all members came from the same country. The main application process runs twice annually.

== Arts centre ==
The arts centre is located at one end of the village of Dun Geagan (Dungegan, Dún Geágaín), one of the main population centres of Ballinskelligs. It has exhibition space, a small shop and a seasonal café.

== Funding ==
The project is funded by philanthropic donations and grants, and fundraising events, with some contributions from Ireland's Arts Council and the government department responsible for the arts. Many of the artists who have visited the retreat have donated work to the project, allowing its selling on to raise funds. One painter, Aurelio Caminati (in Italian) stayed for a whole summer and left his entire seasonal output for sale. Work from the retreat have been sold at Noelle Campbell-Sharp's galleries in Dublin. The first of these, on St. Stephen's Green, was dedicated to work from Cill Rialaig, and was opened by the Tánaiste Dick Spring, with the Ambassador of the US, Jean Kennedy Smith in attendance. The Origin Gallery on Fitzwilliam Street acted for Cill Rialaig over years, and while moving in 2019 has already announced that it will continue to do so. For a period the Urban Retreat Art Gallery on Hanover Quay, by Grand Canal Dock, opened 2006, also assisted, with more experimental collections. Branded specifically with the link to Cill Rialaig, Urban Retreat hosted many exhibitions, with one opening, for Gemma Billington, attended by Niall Quinn and Kate Middleton.

Other fundraising events have included a corporate golf weekend with breakfast at the K-Club, a reception at Aras an Uachtarain and dinners at Dublin Castle and Club Med in Waterville, an art auction at the Irish Club in London at which a Jack Yeats sketch was auctioned along with a signed lithograph by, and donated by, Prince Charles, a series of annual golf events for ambassadors to Ireland and a 2004 event by gardener and TV personality Diarmuid Gavin, who also opened events in 2008 and 2014.

== Governance ==
The project is operated by a primary not-for-profit company, the Kilreelig Project company (Cill Rialaig rendered in its anglicised form), the board of which includes local business and professional figures. It is registered as a charity with the Irish authorities, with a range of trading names for the different operations. It is overseen by a voluntary board of directors, primarily comprising local figures active in the community. Its unpaid managing director and chief fundraiser is Noelle Campbell-Sharp.

== See also ==
- Anam Cara Writer's and Artist's Retreat
- Tyrone Guthrie Centre, Annaghmakerrig
