= Dromore Castle (County Clare) =

- Caisleán Dhrom Mór (Irish)
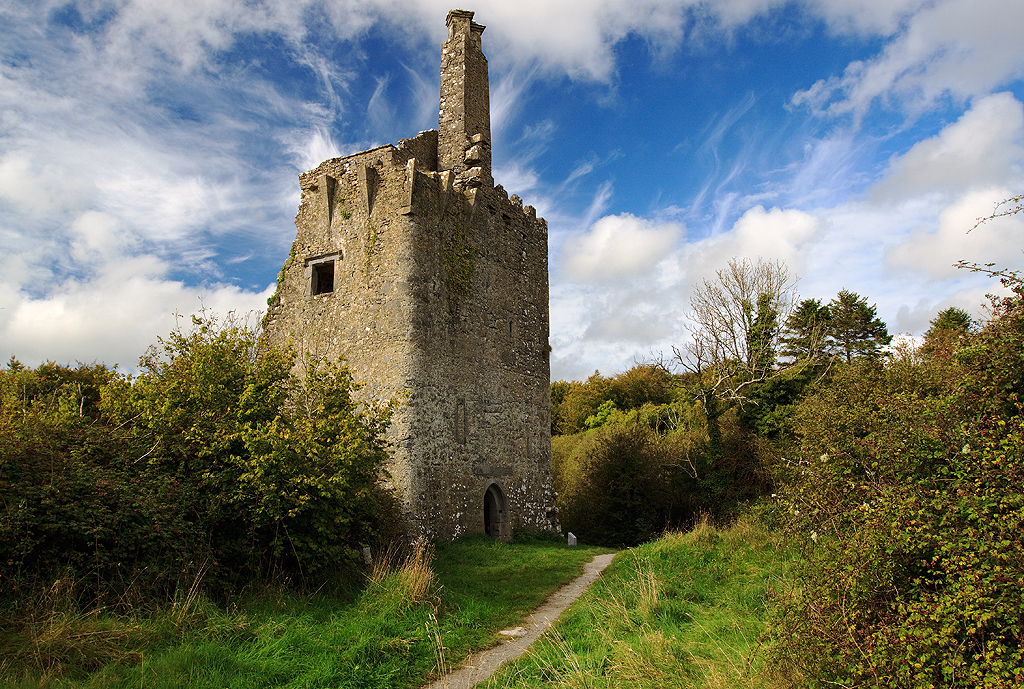

- Location within Ireland
- 52.925479°N 8.962804°W
- Type: tower house
- Location: Dromore, Ruan, County Clare, Ireland

History
- Built: early 16th century

Site notes
- Owner: State

National monument of Ireland
- Official name: Dromore Castle
- Reference no.: 583

Dromore Castle is a tower house and National Monument located between the towns of Crusheen and Corofin in County Clare, Ireland.

Today, it is administered by the National Parks and Wildlife Service as part of the Dromore Wood Nature Reserve.

== Location ==
Dromore Castle is located on a peninsula in the northern part of Dromore Lake, 1.8 km (1.1 mi) east of Ruan. It lies within the Nature Preserve of Dromore Wood.

Dromore townland lies between the towns of Crusheen and Corofin, west of the M18 motorway and north of Ennis.

== History ==
Dromore Castle was probably constructed in the early 16th century. In the 17th century, Teige O'Brien of the O'Brien clan repaired and expanded it. The castle and lands of Dromore had been granted to Teige's father, Connor (Third Earl of Thomond), in 1579. Dermot, son of Teige, was an important protagonist in the Confederate Wars and participated in the Siege of Ballyalla Castle (Ennis). The last O'Brien at the castle was Conor, who left in 1689. The castle fell into ruin in the 18th century.

== Description ==
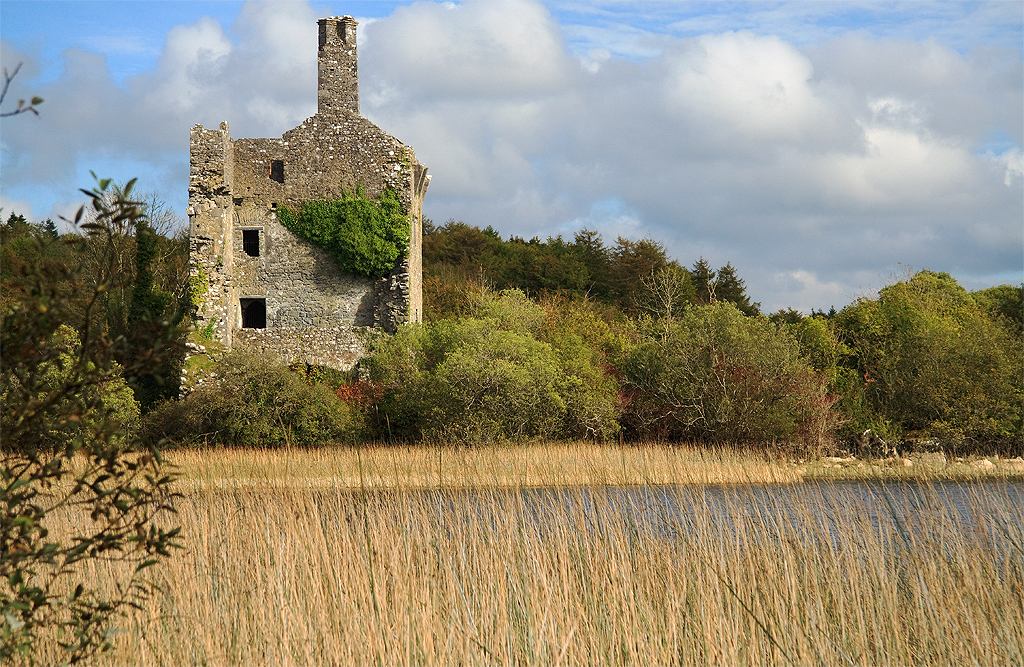
View of the castle from the west

The castle is four storeys high with a vault over the ground floor.

There is a wide circular staircase to the right of the main door, a small guardroom to the left and a stone fireplace in the left-hand chamber of the first floor.

There is a circular shot hole cut into the stairs between the first and second floors. The roof houses a chemin de ronde around the gables, a high rectangular chimney crowned with twin lozenge-shaped flues and corbels which once supported a corner bartizan.

The inscription over the door reads: "This castle was built by Teige, second sone to Connor, third Earle of Thomond and by Slany Brien wife to the said Teige Anno [date illegible]".
