= Ballinskelligs =

Area in western County Kerry, Ireland

Ballinskelligs Baile an Sceilg
- Village
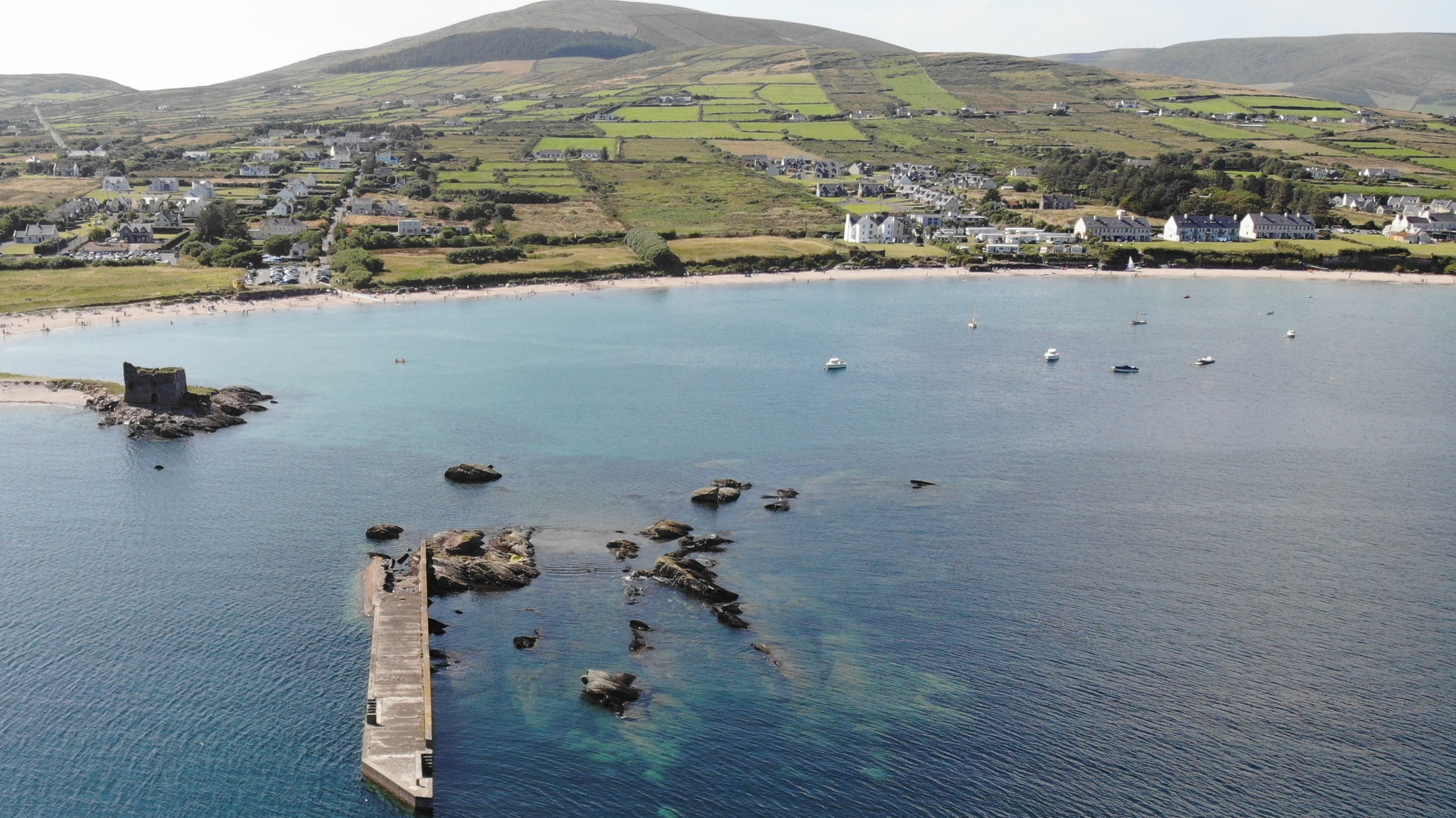

- Location in Ireland
- Coordinates: 51°49′33″N 10°16′20″W
- Country: Ireland
- Province: Munster
- County: County Kerry

Population (2011)
  - Total: 375 (Electoral District)
- Irish Grid Reference: V429657
- Official name: Baile an Sceilg

Ballinskelligs, officially Baile an Sceilg (Irish for "town (townland) of the craggy rock"), is a townland in the civil parish of Prior, County Kerry, Ireland. It may also refer to the wider district around the townland. It is located in the south-west of the Iveragh peninsula (Uíbh Ráthach) and is within the Gaeltacht. According to the 2016 census about 10% of the population of the electoral division speak Irish on a daily basis outside the education system. The townland was in the poor law union of Cahersiveen.

The rocks referred to in the area's Irish name are the Skellig Islands—Skellig Michael and Little Skellig—an ancient monastic colony which lies off the coast from Ballinskelligs. The town is also the site of a beach.

Ballinskelligs was the termination site of an early transatlantic telegraph cable laid in 1875 from Tor Bay, Nova Scotia, Canada—a distance of 2,565 nautical miles (4,750 km).

== Notable features ==
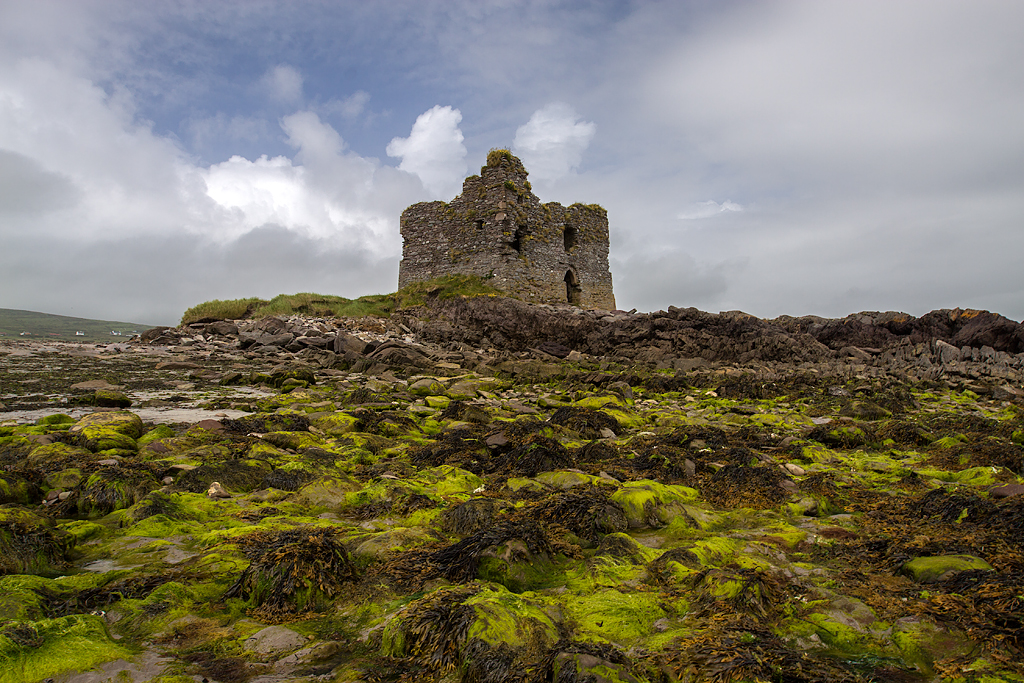
Ruins of Ballinskelligs Castle

Ballinskelligs Castle is situated on the western shore of Ballinskelligs Bay, on a narrow promontory which is subject to heavy erosion. The castle was constructed by the MacCarthy Mór dynasty in the 16th century to protect the bay from pirates, and possibly in order to charge a tariff on incoming trade vessels.

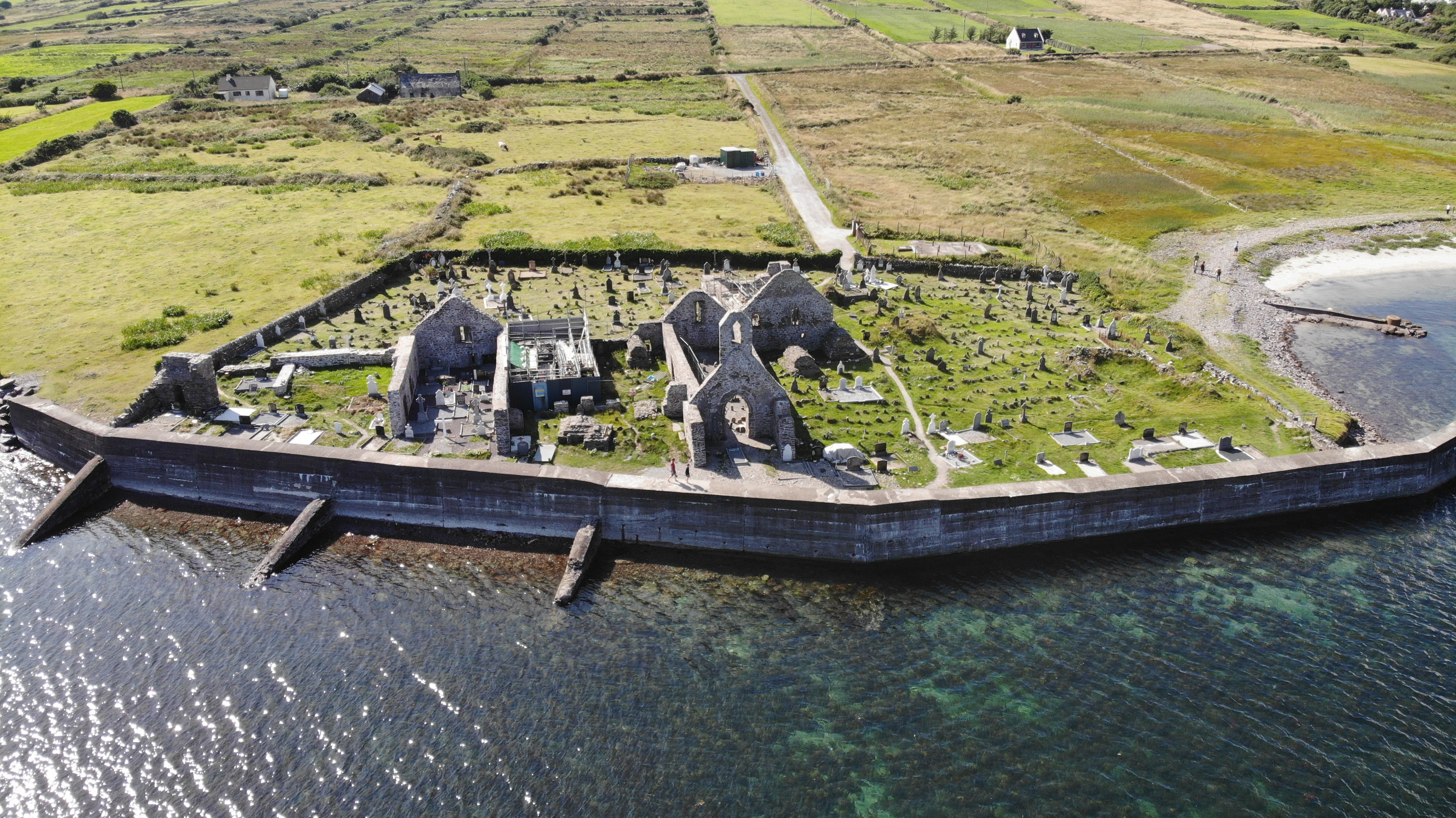
Ballinskelligs Priory

Ballinskelligs Priory was an Arrouaisian house of Augustinian canons.

Within Ballinskelligs are the two parts of the Cill Rialaig project, the Artist Retreat in the former village of Cill Rialaig, and the Arts Centre in the village of Dun Geagan. The project is led, since its foundation in the 1990s, by local resident Noelle Campbell-Sharp of Canuig House.

== See also ==
- List of abbeys and priories in Ireland (County Kerry)
- List of towns and villages in Ireland
