= Terry Keane =

Irish social columnist and journalist

Terry Keane (9 September 1939 – 31 May 2008), born in Guildford, England, was an Irish social columnist and fashion journalist.

== Life ==
Keane was born Ann Teresa O'Donnell in Guildford, Surrey, UK in 1939, to Irish parents, who evacuated her to Ireland during the Blitz. Keane studied medicine at Trinity College, Dublin. She dropped out without taking a degree and later married a young barrister, Ronan Keane. The couple separated in the 1990s, and Ronan Keane went on to become Chief Justice.

== Career ==
Keane spent the majority of her career working for the Irish newspaper, the Sunday Independent, where she was the principal contributor of the Sunday Independent's long-running gossip column, The Keane Edge; she stepped down in 1997 due to ill health.

=== Charles Haughey ===
In the Keane Edge column there were often hints of a relationship with a prominent political figure, named in the column as Sweetie, and her relationship was apparently widely known in certain circles, though never openly confirmed. Keane left the paper on bad terms after selling the story of her 27-year affair with former Taoiseach Charles Haughey to the British newspaper The Sunday Times, a rival to the affiliated London Independent newspapers, though she admitted her affair on The Late Late Show in 1999. She later stated that she regretted making the relationship public.

== Death ==
Keane had four children. Her death on 31 May 2008 after a long illness was announced by her son-in-law, media gardener Diarmuid Gavin. One of her granddaughters, Holly Carpenter, was Miss Ireland in 2011.
