= Ballinskelligs Castle =

Ruin of a castle in County Kerry, Ireland

- Ballinskelligs, County Kerry
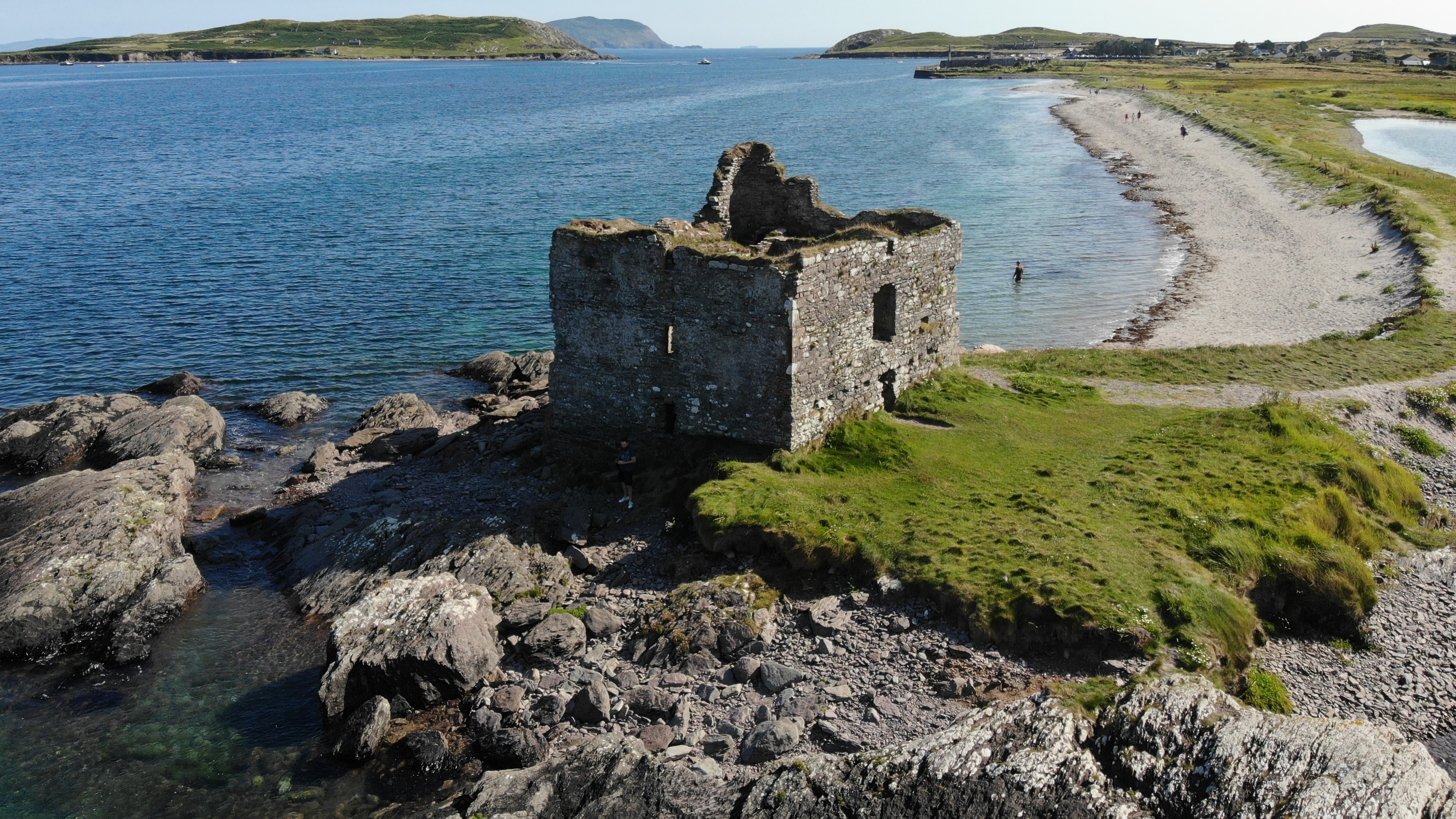
- Ruins of Ballinskelligs Castle.

Location
- Location within Ireland
- Coordinates: 51.8200970°N 10.2705060°W

Ballinskelligs Castle is a castle located near Ballinskelligs on the Iveragh Peninsula in County Kerry, Ireland. The castle is situated on the western shore of Ballinskelligs Bay, on a narrow promontory which is subject to heavy erosion. The castle was constructed by the MacCarthy Mórs in the 16th century to protect the bay from pirates, and possibly in order to charge a tariff on incoming trade vessels.

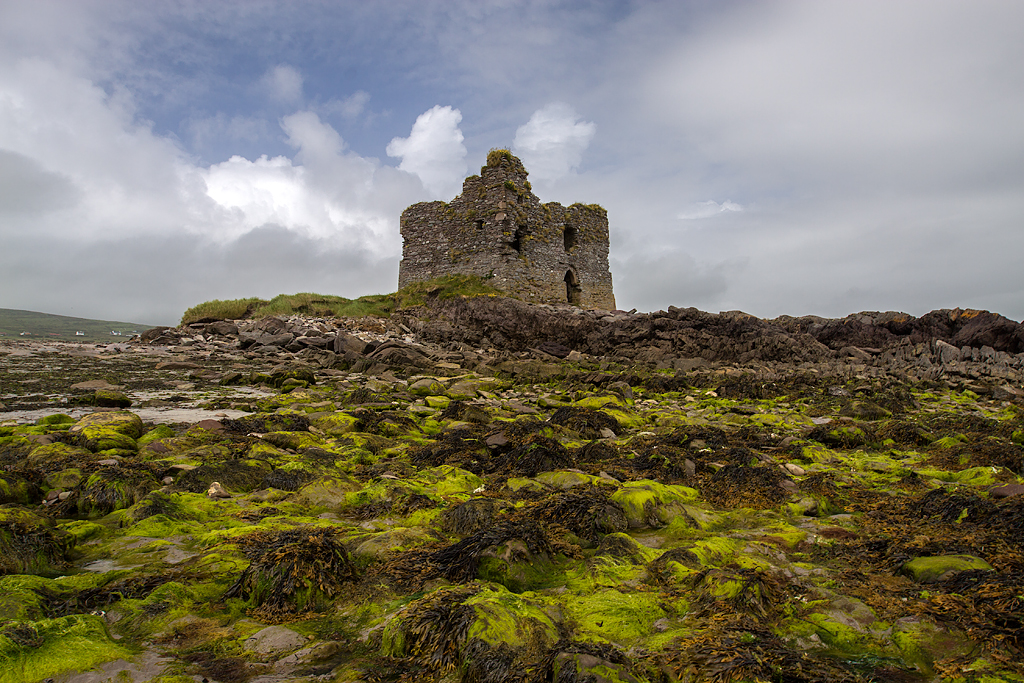
Ruins of Ballinskelligs Castle
