= Dromore, County Clare =

Townland with nature reserve in County Clare, Ireland

Dromore Wood
- Dromore, County Clare
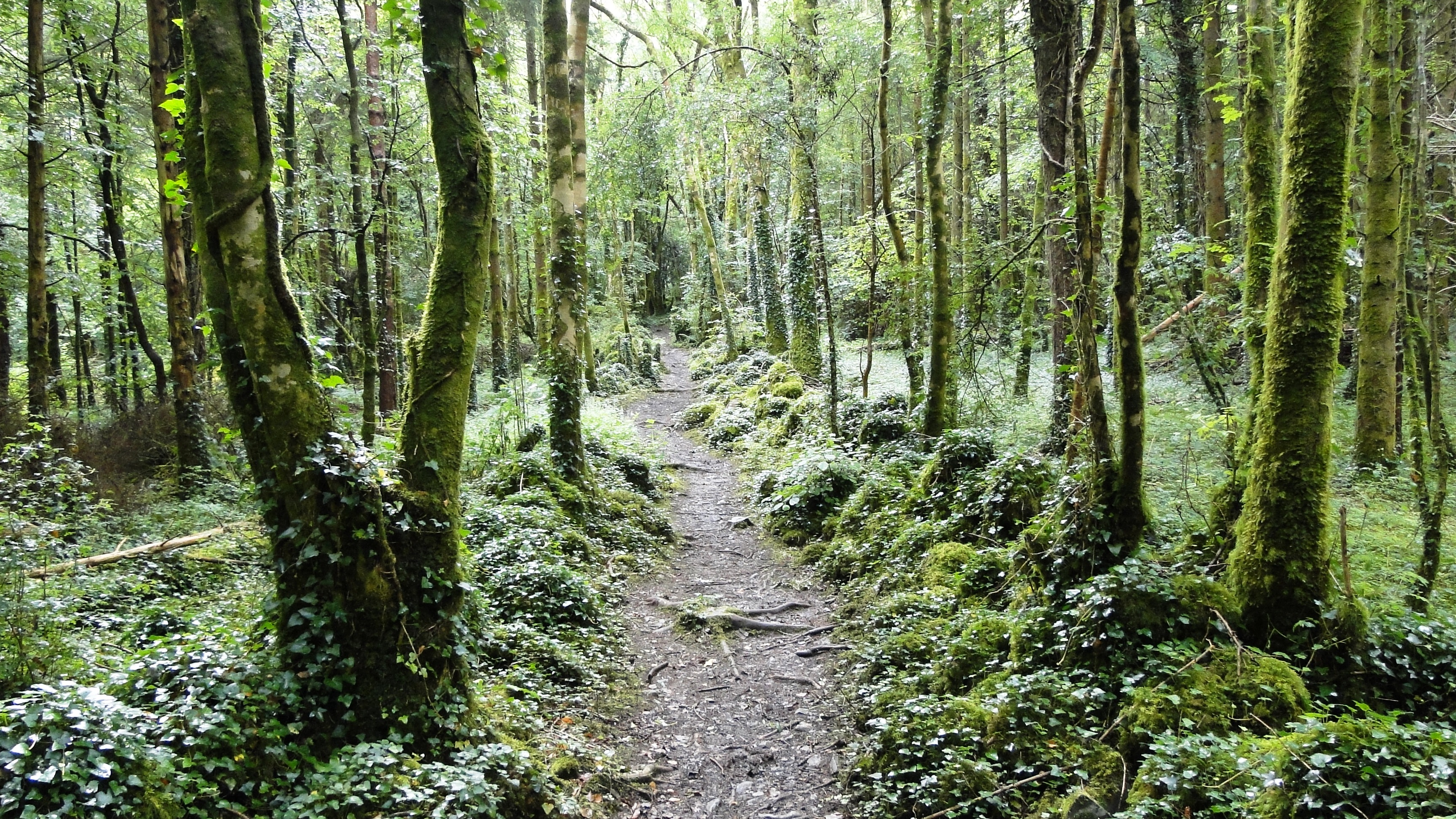
- Woodland path in Dromore Wood

- Location within Ireland
- Nearest city: Ennis
- Coordinates: 52°55′29.9″N 8°57′43.6″W
- Area: circa 1,000 acres
- Established: 1985
- Governing body: National Parks and Wildlife Service (Ireland)

Dromore, County Clare is a rural townland in County Clare, Ireland. It is located in the parish of Ruan and was formerly the location of Dromore House. Today, most of the townland is accounted for by Dromore Wood Nature Reserve. It is open to the public and also contains the ruins of Dromore Castle.

== Geography ==
Dromore is located between the towns of Crusheen and Corofin, west of the M18 motorway and north of Ennis. The townland also contains Dromore Lake, fed by the River Fergus. The townland features a variety of terrain: rivers, lakes, turloughs, callows (flooded meadows), limestone pavement, fens, reed beds and woodland.

== History ==
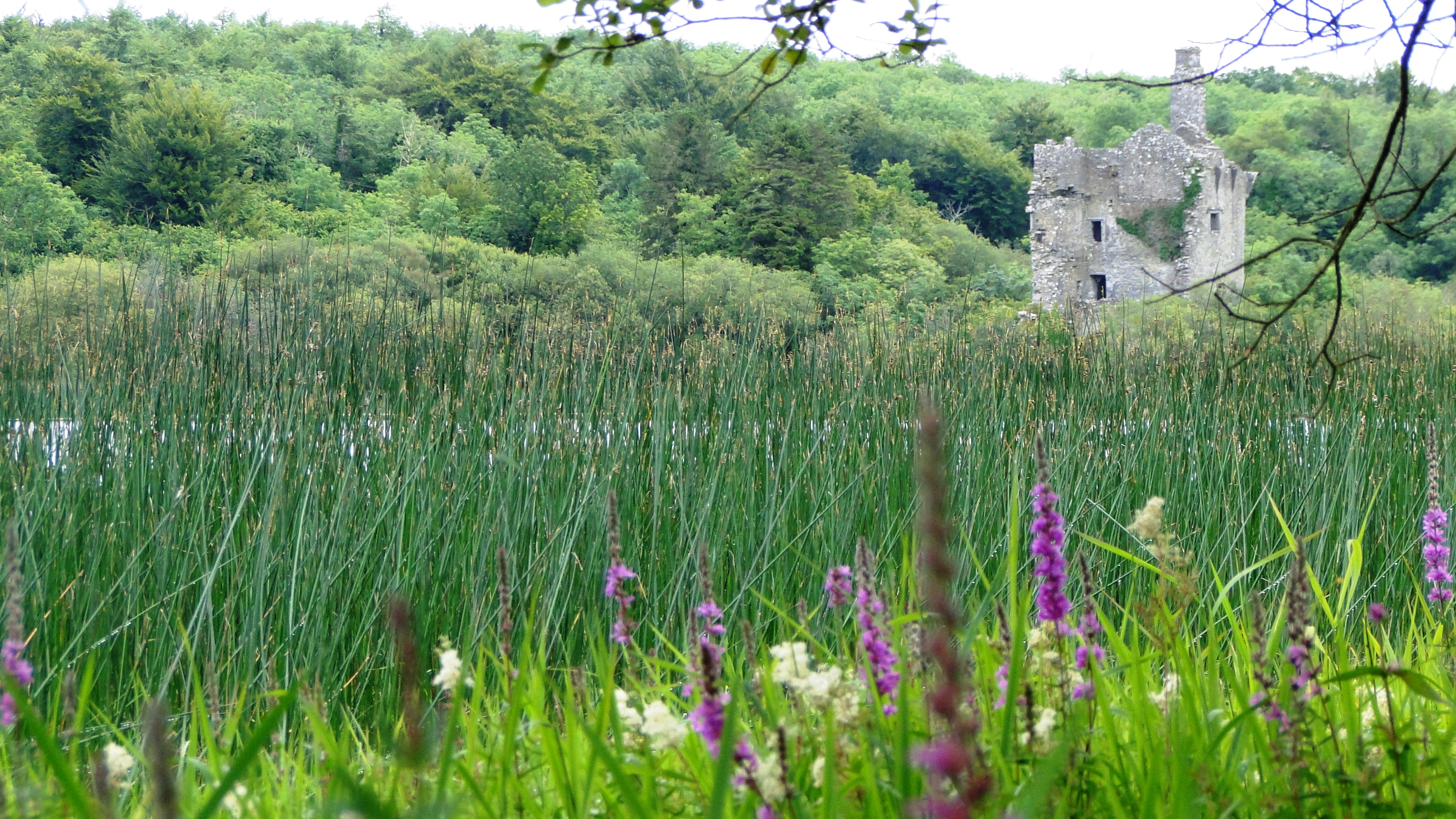
Dromore Castle viewed from Rabbit Island.

Dromore Castle was probably constructed in the early 16th century. In the 17th century, Teige O'Brien of the O'Brien clan repaired and expanded it. The castle and lands of Dromore had been granted to Teige's father, Connor (Third Earl of Thomond), in 1579. Dermot, son of Teige, was an important protagonist in the Confederate Wars and participated in the Siege of Ballyalla Castle (Ennis). The last O'Brien at the castle was Conor, who left in 1689. The castle fell into ruin in the 18th century.

In 1814, Jonas Studdert, third son of Richard Studdert of Clonderalaw, lived in Dromore House. He had married Mary Crowe of Dromore in 1795. In 1837, the house was the home of R. Crowe. Although it was originally a hunting lodge, it became the main seat of the Crowe family in the 1830s. In 1855, during Griffith's valuation, Thomas Crowe was listed as occupier ("in fee") of Dromore and neighbouring Cahermacrea townlands and some others. In 1901, the Census listed Thomas Crowe as proprietor.

Dromore House was sold in 1936 and later demolished. Dromore Wood was bought by the Irish state in the 1940s and subsequently used as a commercial forest. In the 1980s, the National Parks and Wildlife Service (Office of Public Works) took over. In 1985, the area became a statutory nature reserve.

Other historical sites nearby include ruined Cahermacrea Castle, the remains of Kilbakee Church, two ring forts, a limekiln, a children's burial ground and a chapel.

== Flora and fauna ==
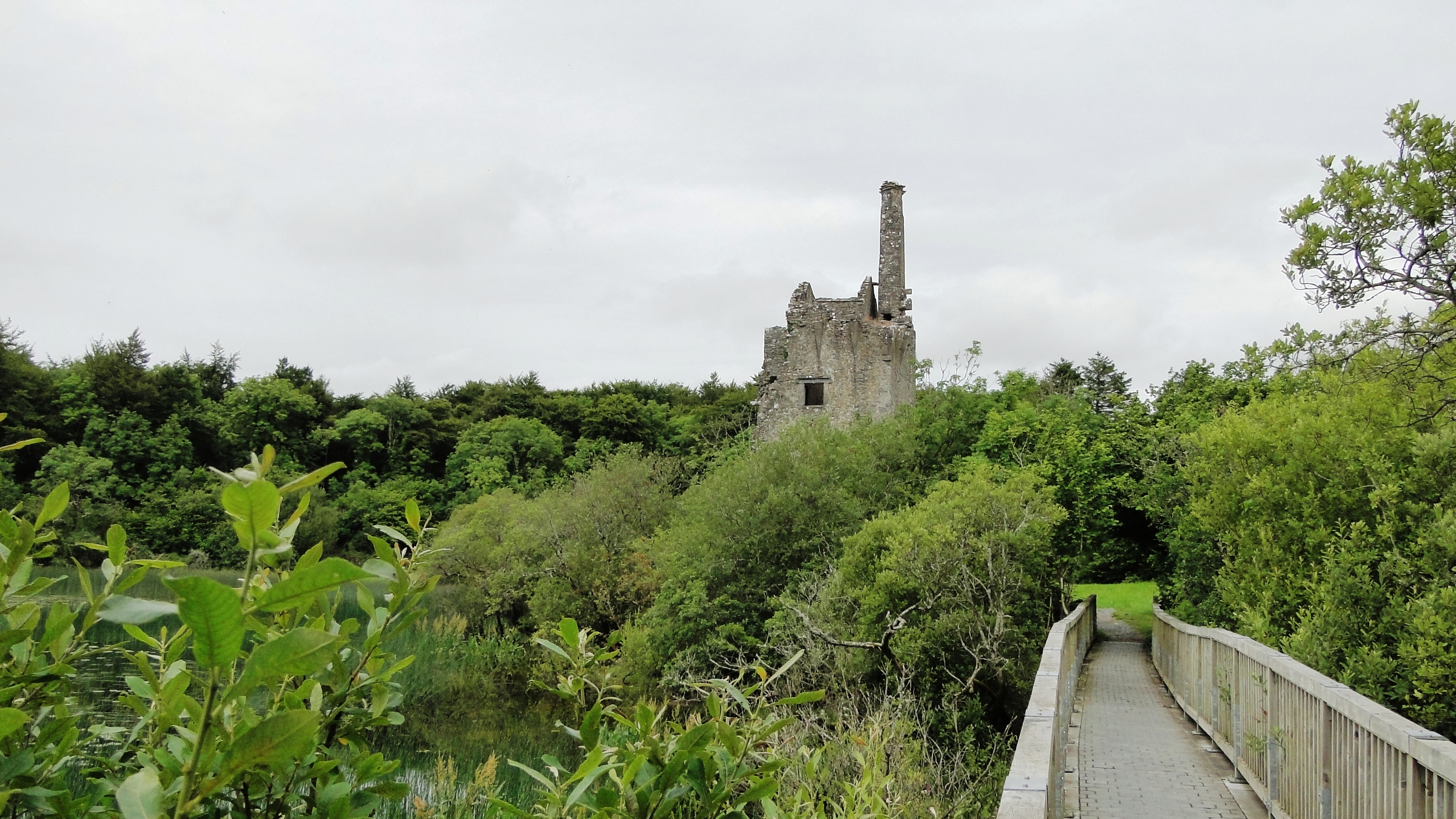
Dromore Castle with wooden walkway.

Notable inhabitants of the area include the pine marten (a local study of this species in the 1970s has become a "major reference for the species"), red squirrels, badgers, stoats, foxes, hares, shrews, wood mice, eight species of bats and otters. Birdlife includes coots, grebes, moorhen, water rail and heron. During the winter floods, teal, wigeon, goldeneye, tufted duck, pochard, shoveler and whooper swans visit. In 2011/12, a white tailed eagle was observed. Insects include dragonflies and various butterfly species.

== Today ==
The Nature Reserve encompasses around 1,000 acres (400 hectares). There is a Special Area of Conservation which covers a larger area.

The visitor centre is run by the National Parks & Wildlife Service as an offshoot of the Coole Park Nature Reserve near Gort. The Dromore Wood Nature Reserve features six marked walking trails of differing length.
