= Ronan Keane =

Irish lawyer and former Chief Justice

Chief Justice of Ireland
- In office 31 January 2000 – 23 July 2004
- Nominated by: Government of Ireland
- Appointed by: Mary McAleese
- Preceded by: Liam Hamilton
- Succeeded by: John L. Murray

Judge of the Supreme Court
- In office 15 April 1996 – 28 November 2004
- Nominated by: Government of Ireland
- Appointed by: Mary Robinson

Judge of the High Court
- In office 11 July 1979 – 15 April 1996
- Nominated by: Government of Ireland
- Appointed by: Patrick Hillery

Personal details
- Born: 20 July 1932 (age 94) Castleknock, Dublin, Ireland
- Party: Fianna Fáil
- Spouse: Terry Keane (m. 1962; div. 1996)
- Relations: Diarmuid Gavin (son-in-law)
- Children: 3
- Education: University College Dublin; King's Inns

Ronan Colman Keane (born 20 July 1932) is a retired Irish judge who served as Chief Justice of Ireland from 2000 to 2004, a Judge of the Supreme Court from 1996 to 2004 and a Judge of the High Court from 1979 to 1996.

Keane was educated at Blackrock College, Dublin, and later graduated from University College Dublin (UCD) in 1953, with a BA in Modern History. He was called to the Bar in 1954 and became a Senior Counsel in 1970. He was appointed as a High Court judge in July 1979. He was head of the Tribunal of Inquiry into the Stardust fire in 1981, and chairman of the Law Reform Commission from 1987 to 1992. He has published many legal texts and papers and participated in Council of Europe programmes developing legal systems in Post-Communist Europe. He was elevated to the Supreme Court in 1996, becoming Chief Justice in 2000. Chief Justice Keane received an Honorary Doctorate from UCD in 2001, and has been an adjunct professor at Trinity College Dublin since his retirement.

In 1962, Keane married Therese O'Donnell, who, as Terry Keane, became a fashion journalist and later a social diarist. They had three children together, and later became close to Terry's daughter, who had been adopted. The couple separated in the 1980s but remained amicable. Their son Tim died suddenly in 2004. In 1999, Terry revealed on The Late Late Show her affair beginning in 1972 with sometime Taoiseach Charles Haughey. Ronan and Terry's daughter Justine Keane is married to Diarmuid Gavin, the Irish garden designer and television personality.

Keane was for some years the Independent Chairman of the Appeals Board of the Turf Club of Ireland.

== Publications ==
- Keane, Ronan (1982). Law of Local Government in the Republic of Ireland. Law Society of Ireland. ISBN 0-902027-21-2.
- Keane, Ronan (1988). Equity and the Laws of Trusts in the Republic of Ireland. Butterworths. ISBN 0-406-10270-8.
- Keane, Ronan (2007). Company Law in the Republic of Ireland (4th ed.). Tottel. ISBN 978-1-84592-298-6.
- Keane, Ronan (2011). Equity and the Law of Trusts in Ireland. Bloomsbury.
- Judges as lawmakers – the Irish experience Address to NUI, Galway Law Society on 1 October 2003
- 30 years of Law Reform 1975–2005 Lecture To Mark the Thirtieth Anniversary of the Law Reform Commission At Farmleigh House, Phoenix Park, Dublin 23 June 2005

Legal offices
Preceded by Liam Hamilton	Chief Justice of Ireland; 2000–2004	Succeeded by John L. Murray
