= Dromore Lough, County Clare =

Freshwater lake in the Mid-West Region of Ireland

Dromore Lough
- Loch Dhrom Mór (Irish)
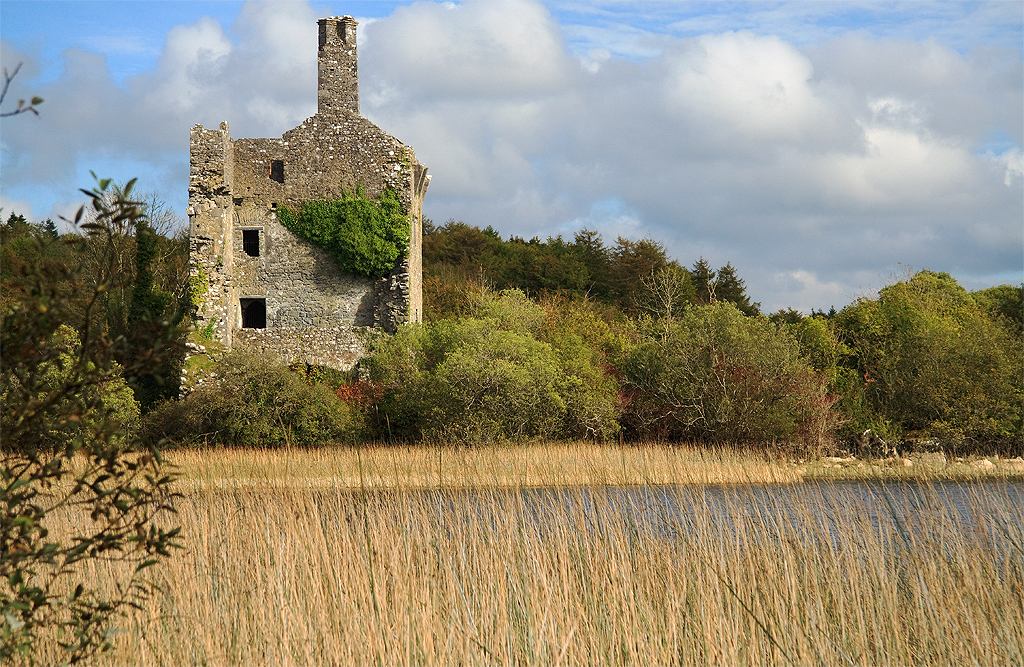
- Dromore Castle with lake in foreground

- Location in Ireland
- Location: County Clare
- Coordinates: 52°55′12″N 8°58′17″W
- Primary outflows: River Fergus
- Basin countries: Ireland
- Max. length: 1.7 km (1.1 mi)
- Max. width: 0.9 km (0.6 mi)
- Surface area: 0.49 km^{2} (0.19 sq mi)
- Average depth: 5.9 m (19 ft)
- Max. depth: 20 m (66 ft)

Dromore Lough (Irish: Loch Dhrom Mór) is a freshwater lake in the Mid-West Region of Ireland. It is located in County Clare.

== Geography ==
Dromore Lough measures about 2 km (1.2 mi) long and 1 km (0.6 mi) wide. It is about 10 km (6 mi) north of Ennis near the village of Ruan. Dromore Castle lies on the lake's northeastern shore. The lake is located in the townland of Dromore.

== Natural history ==
Fish species in Dromore Lough include perch, rudd, pike and the critically endangered European eel. Bird life at the lake includes little grebe, whooper swan, wigeon, gadwall, teal and tufted duck. The lake is part of the Dromore Woods and Loughs Special Area of Conservation.

== See also ==
- List of loughs in Ireland
