= Dromore Castle (County Kerry) =

Castellated 19th-century manor house in County Kerry, Ireland

Coordinates: 51°51′27″N 9°42′59″W

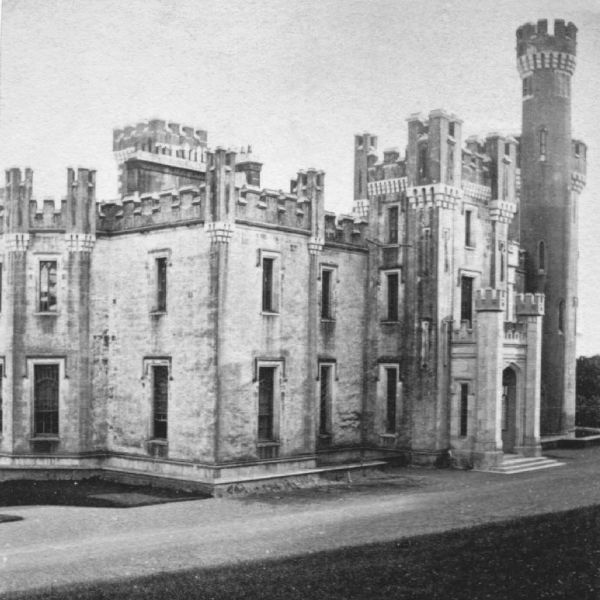
A postcard of Dromore Castle c.1900

Dromore Castle is a manor house in Templenoe, County Kerry, Ireland, looking out over the Kenmare River. It was built in the 1830s for the Mahony family to a neo-Gothic design by Sir Thomas Deane.

== Building ==
Dromore Castle was designed and built for Denis Mahony by the architect Thomas Deane, probably assisted by his brother Kearns Deane. Work began in 1831, although the account books show that only a negligible amount had been carried out before May 1834. Building work was completed in 1839.

The house is in the castellated Gothic Revival style, with an external finish of Roman Cement with limestone dressings. With the notable exception of the grand south facing window with its pointed arch, the windows consist of pointed tracery contained within rectangular frames, a style characteristic of Deane's domestic work. The entrance hall, which is in the form of a long gallery, takes up half of the area of the ground floor. The west wing of the Castle takes the form of a round tower, with a spiral staircase contained within an attached turret.

== History ==
Although Dromore Castle appears to have been built on the instructions of Denis Mahony, his father John Mahony had made the decision to build a large home earlier in the 19th century, but apparently abandoned the attempt after his yacht, returning from London with lead for the roof and wine for the cellar, sank in the Kenmare River, in view of the site of the house. After this, no further work took place until Deane began building work for Denis Mahony in the 1830s

Denis Mahony was a minister of the Church of Ireland and a keen proselytiser. He is known to have set up a soup kitchen at Dromore during the time of the Great Famine, and preached in the chapel at Dromore to the hungry who came for food. His proselytizing activities did not make him a popular figure in the locality, and in 1850 he was attacked in his church at Templenoe. On returning to Dromore, he found a further angry group had uprooted flower beds, felled trees and were about to set fire to the castle; it is claimed that they were only stopped by the intervention of the local Catholic priest, Fr John O'Sullivan.

After Rev. Denis Mahony's death in 1851, the castle was inherited by his son Richard John Mahony, who successfully ran the estate in addition to farming oyster beds in the bay. When Richard Mahony died, the castle then passed in turn to his son, Harold Segerson Mahony.

Harold Mahony was a successful tennis player, and indeed was the last Irish winner at Wimbledon. His tennis court can still be found in the gardens at the Castle. It was in the late 1800s, during Harold Mahony's time as head of the household, that Harold Boulton, best known for writing the lyrics of the Skye Boat Song, came to visit Dromore, and it is then that he is thought to have written the words to the popular song "The Castle of Dromore," published in 1892 in English and later translated into Irish.

When Harold Mahony was killed in a bicycle accident in 1905, he left no heirs, and the castle was passed to his sister, Norah Hood. She in turn left the castle to her cousin, Hugh Bolton Waller, and the castle remained in the hands of the Waller family until 1993 when it was offered for sale. Dromore Castle is now owned by an investment company who are attempting to restore the house.

== Grounds ==
Beyond the castle's gardens and outbuildings, the majority of the former grounds are now owned by Coillte Teoranta, the Irish forestry board. The Kerry Way runs through the grounds, and there are various footpaths leading to the Kenmare River. Entrance to the grounds from the N70 road between Kenmare and Sneem is through a castellated gatehouse, also by Thomas Deane.

== See also ==
- List of castles in the Republic of Ireland
