= Kilmacrehy =

Kilmacrehy Cill Mhic Creiche
- Civil parish
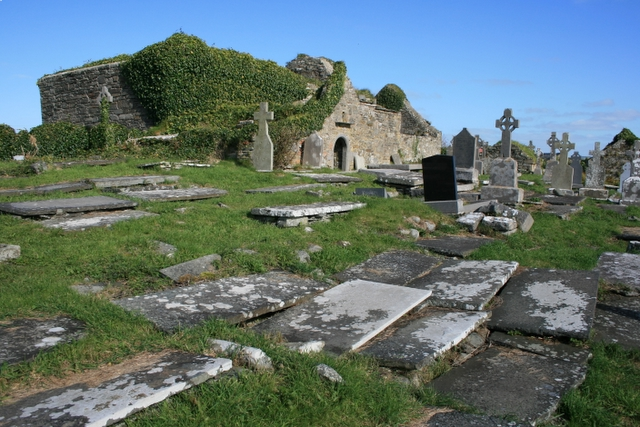
- The ruined church of Kilmacreehy

- Location within Ireland
- Coordinates: 52.943694°N 9.375528°W
- Country: Ireland
- County: Clare

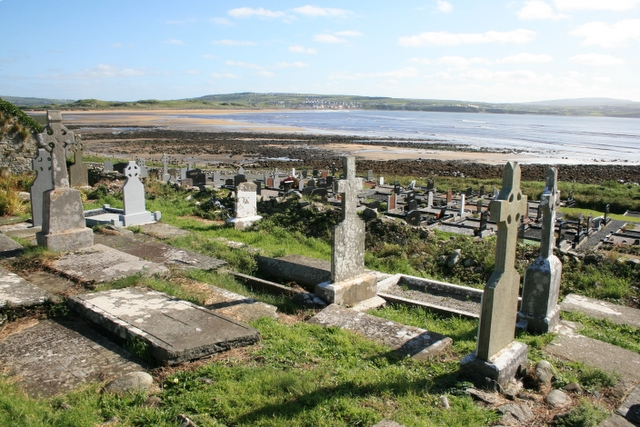
Graveyard

Kilmacrehy, sometimes also Kilmacreehy, (Irish: Cill Mhic Creiche) is a civil parish in County Clare, Ireland. The ruins of the old parish church lie near the coastal village of Liscannor, which is also a part of the parish.

== Geography ==
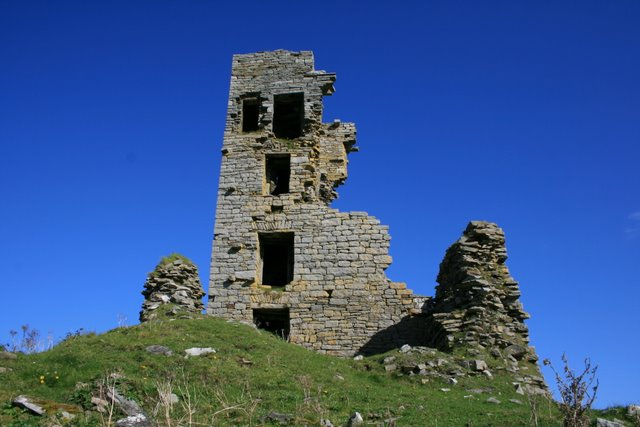
Liscannor Castle

Kilmacrehy is part of the historical Barony of Corcomroe. It is about 4 miles (6.4 km) to the west of Ennistymon. It is on the north shore of Liscannor Bay on the western coast of Clare. The parish makes up the peninsula that extends to the basaltic promontory called Hag's Head. From this point the Cliffs known as the Cliffs of Moher run to the northeast gradually rising to O'Brien's Tower, (Note: The Cliffs of Moher are named after Moher ui Ruaidhin (O'Ruaidhin's fort), an old stone fort that stood near Hag's Head. The fort was pulled down at the start of the 19th century and its stones used to build a telegraph tower.) where they are about 600 feet (180 m) above sea level.

Dough townland is the only part of the parish that lies on the south bank of the estuary of the Inagh River.

The parish once had the alias of Quoranna, meaning "the distinct projection", an allusion to the imposing cliffs.

An 1837 account says that the parish contained 5,492 acres (2,223 ha), as applotted under the tithe act, including pasture and arable land fertilised with seaweed. An 1845 account gives the parish a total area of 7,403 acres (2,996 ha), and dimensions of about 3.75 by 3.5 miles (6.04 by 5.63 km).

Today, part of the town of Lahinch is located in the townland of Dough.

== Townlands ==
The parish includes the townlands of Ardnacraa, Ardnahea, Ballycotteen North, Ballycotteen South, Ballyea, Ballyheean, Ballyherragh, Ballylaan, Ballymaclinaun, Ballynalackan, Ballysteen, Ballyvorda, Ballyvislane, Beaghy, Caherbarnagh, Caherycahill, Cloghaundine, Derreen, Dough, Kilconnell, Kineilty, Laghcloon, Laghvally, Liscannor, Lislorkan North, Lislorkan South, Rannagh, Shingaunagh North, Shingaunagh South, Slievenageeragh and Teeraghbeg.

== History ==
The parish is possibly named after Saint Mac Creiche, who according to tradition founded several churches in what is now County Clare. He may not have been a historical figure, however. The parish church of Kilmacrehy is the only one that bears his name. Some rocks out in the bay before the strand are called MacCreiche's Bed, and about 200 metres (660 ft) to the northwest is MacCreiche's Well.

In 1588 some ships of the Spanish Armada were wrecked on the shore. As of 1831 the parish's population was 3,343. By 1841 it was 4,264 in 673 houses.

== Antiquities ==
The ruins of the old parish church in Laghcloon townland, east of Liscannor, features several arches and prominent moldings in its walls.

Despite the alleged early Christian roots, written documentation only goes back to the 14th century. Most of the ornamentation that survives today dates to much later. The nave features a holy water font, a window and a broken bell chamber on the west wall. A high semi-Gothic arch divides the nave from the chancel, which may be a later addition to the church. A recess in the north wall reportedly served as a tomb like a similar structure in Kilfenora Cathedral. A prominent hood is crowned by a mitred head. A recess in the south wall may have once been a window with two Gothic arches topped by a carved head wearing a flat cap. It was reconstructed in a drawing by Thomas Johnson Westropp.

Aodh Buí Mac Cruitín was buried in an unmarked grave in the churchyard.

The parish also holds two ruined castles: Dough and Liscannor.

== Ecclesiastical parishes ==
There is a holy well near Birchfield dedicated to Saint Bridget. The devotees and people looking for the cure of illness would visit the well on the eve of the first Sunday of August.

In 1834 there were 3,571 Roman Catholics and 24 Protestants. As of 1837 the parish was part of the Catholic district of Liscanor, which also includes the parish of Killaspuglenane.

From 1779 the Church of Ireland vicarage of Kilmacrehy was part of the archdeaconry of Kilfenora, which also included the vicarages of Kilmanaheen, Kilaspughenane, Killeilagh and Kilmoon, and after 1785 included the rectories of Carrune and Killeilagh. The archdeaconry was in the Diocese of Kilfenora, and the province of Cashel.
