= Ennistymon (parish) =

- Roman Catholic parish
- Location in Ireland
- Coordinates: 52°56′N 9°17′W
- Country: Ireland
- Province: Munster
- County: County Clare
- Time zone: UTC+0 (WET)
  - Summer (DST): UTC-1 (IST (WEST))

Ennistymon parish is a Catholic parish in County Clare, Ireland. It is part of the Kilfenora Deanery of the Roman Catholic Diocese of Galway, Kilmacduagh and Kilfenora. In the past, the parish was named Kilmanaheen. It is centred upon the villages of Ennistymon and Lahinch. The parish is amalgamated with the former parish of Clooney.

Fr. Robert McNamara, of the neighbouring parish of Lisdoonvarna/Kilshanny, became the parish priest of Ennistymon in 2025, taking over from Fr. William Cummins in Ennistymon and Fr. Des Forde in Lahinch.

The main church of the parish is the Church of Our Lady and St. Michael in Ennistymon, built in 1954. In 1948, the design of the Derry based partnership of Frank Corr and Liam McCormick won a Royal Institute of the Architects of Ireland competition for a church in Ennistymon to seat one thousand parishioners. The client, Father John Jennings, wished to replace a smaller, earlier nearby church built in the 1830s.

The Church of Our Lady and St. Michael was a breakthrough design in concrete, with large rectangular windows, an angular front, and an asymmetrical belfry hinting at the influence of pre-war modern Swiss churches. The building of this church began in 1952 with Farmer Bros. of Dublin as the main contractors. After two years of construction, the church was blessed and celebrated its first mass on the Feast of the Immaculate Conception, 8 December 1954.

The second church of the parish is the Church of Our Lady The Immaculate Conception in Lahinch, also built in 1954. Both 1954 churches replaced older churches. The third church of the parish is the Church of St. Columba in Clouna, built in 1846 by Fr. John Sheehan.

In the townland of Furglan (Furraglaun), the old national school was used as a auxiliary church. Later on, this church was closed due to changing demands.
