= Killaspuglonane =

Killaspuglonane Cill Easpaig Lonáin
- Civil parish
- Location in Ireland
- Coordinates: 52.956782°N 9.344823°W
- Country: Ireland
- Province: Munster
- County: County Clare
- Time zone: UTC+0 (WET)
  - Summer (DST): UTC-1 (IST (WEST))

Killaspuglonane (Irish: Cill Easpaig Lonáin) is a civil parish in County Clare, Ireland.

== Location ==
Killaspuglonane in the part of the historical barony of Corcomroe. It is 2.75 miles (4.43 km) northwest of Ennistymon. The parish is 2.75 by 2.75 miles (4.43 by 4.43 km) and covers 3,547 acres (1,435 ha). The land runs north from the upper part of Liscannor Bay, and is mostly pastoral upland. In 1841 the population was 1,824 in 297 houses. The Catholic parish was united with the chapel of Kilmacrehy.

== Antiquities ==
Killaspuglonane parish contained a ruined church dedicated to Saint Flannán, the first bishop of Killaloe. As of 2022 only a cemetery is left. A holy well dedicated to Saint Flannán is a little to the southwest of the old church. There was a castle in the townland of Tullamore that was the property of Sir Daniel O’Brien, of Dough.

The MacCurtin family, who owned the townlands of Carrowduff in Killaspuglonane and Laghvally in Kilmacrechy, were noted for their scholarship. The Annals of the Four Masters records the deaths of Kelloch MacCurtin, chief historian of Thomond (1376), Gilla Duivin MacCurtin, ollav of Thomond in music (1404), Sencha MacCurtin, ollav of Thomond in history and generally skilled in the arts of poetry and music (1435) and Geanann MacCurtin, intended ollav of Thomond in history (1436).

== Townlands ==
Townlands are Ballyellery, Ballyfaudeen, Caheraderry, Carrowduff, Curraghadoo, Killaspuglonane, Knocknaraha, Moymore North, Moymore South, Rannagh and Tullamore.
