= Mac Creiche =

Irish saint who lived in 6th century AD

- Born: 6th century
- Died: 6th century
- Occupation: Saint
- Known for: Defeat of Chrom Chonaill

Mac Creiche (or Maccreehy, MacCrecius) of Liscannor is described by various old texts as an early Irish saint, a hermit who slew monsters and persuaded kings to submit to him through miracles. He was probably not a historical figure. The stories of his life are most likely derived from earlier pagan legends, and he may be equated with a pagan god.

The civil parish of Kilmacrehy on the west coast of County Clare is named after him.

== Family ==
Location of Kilmacrehy in the Barony of Corcomroe, Ireland

Mac Creiche is said to have lived in the late 6th century and to have been descended from the god Ercc, the Corcu MoDruad chieftain Mac Ercc. According to his biography, the Corcu MoDruad was the leading sept of the Tuadmumu region of northern County Clare, which included the Corcomroe and Burren baronies, and was paramount over the neighbouring people of Cenél Fermaic. His homeland "Corcu Mruad in Nindois" also included the Aran Islands.

One source says Mac Creiche's father was Pesslan (not an Irish name) and his mother was from the Cíarraige people. (Note: The Cíarraige were the people of what is now County Kerry.) It is possible that the Corcu MoDruad were subordinates in an alliance led by the Cíarraige. Another source says he was of the Fermacaig, and the son of Saint Ailbe of Emly. (Note: Saint Ailbhe of Emly died in the year 541, which places a date in the life of Mac Creiche.) The sources agree that he was connected to the Cíarraige. He may have been a cousin of Saint Brendan of Clonfert on his mother's side. Mac Creiche is said to have lived to 180 years of age, which would make him one of the oldest of the Irish saints. (Note: Mac Creiche was not the longest-lived of the Irish saints. Saint Mochta of Louth is reported to have lived to 300 years of age. Nineteen kings reigned during the life of the druid Mug Ruith.)

== Legends ==
Various legends of the saint are recorded in his life and other sources.

=== Sea shore legends ===
Mac Creiche lived as a hermit in a structure made of four stones at a place called Cluain Í. The dwelling had "a stone at his back, a stone to each side, and a stone in front of him", and seems to have been designed for discomfort. (Note: An unusual structure on Inis Cealtra called the "Anchorite's cell" is made of four tall upright stone slabs. It may well have been erected by an anchorite named Coscrach who died in 898, and who followed the example of Mac Creiche.) He lived a frugal life: "Mac Creiche, the devout, loved / A hard and undefiled dungeon. / From Shrovetide to Easter would he subsist / Upon only bread and cresses."

He was a pupil of Ailbe of Emly. Ailbe and Mac Creiche once made a spring appear through their prayers. Saint Mainchín is described as Mac Creiche's son, or spiritual son, whom Mac Creiche baptized and taught. Mainchín and Mac Creiche went to Fid Inis, an island, where Mac Creiche told Mainchín to fetter him and hand him the key. Mac Creiche threw the key into the sea, saying he would stay on the island until the key came out of the water to free him. Ailbe later came to Fid Inis. He caught a salmon and found the fetter key in its stomach, with which he released Mac Creiche.

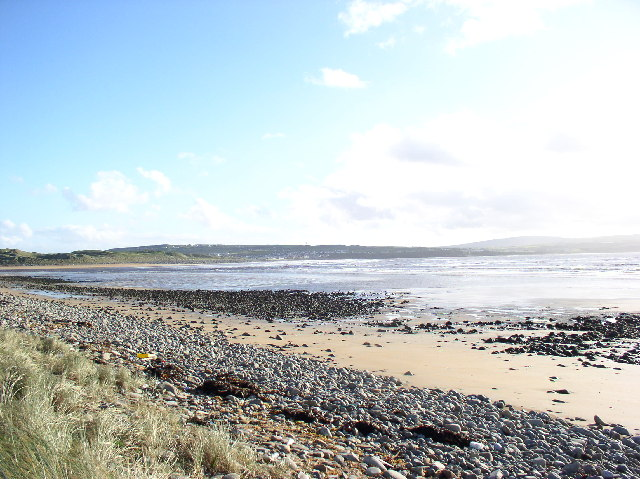
The beach near Kilmacrehy

Mac Creiche travelled to Aran with Ailbe. Mainchín waited on the shore at Cluain Dirair (today's Kilmacrehy), near the fort of Baethbrónach, king of Corco Mruad. Mainchín purchased a ridge of corn from Baethbrónach, which he sowed. When Mac Creiche and Ailbe returned, Mainchín began to reap his corn, while Baethbrónach's men reaped another ridge by the fort. A strong wind swept over Baethbrónach's field and blew all his corn into the sea, while Mainchín's remained unharmed in the sun. This convinced Baethbrónach to submit to the saints, with his people. Mac Creiche declared that the coast in this region would henceforth be safe from damage by the sea.

=== Plague monster legend ===
Mac Creiche was called upon by the Cíarraige, his mother's people, to save them from a monster. The Brioch-Seach (badger monster) appeared in Loch Briocsighe (badger's lake). Today this is called Loch-no-Rátha (Lough Raha), and lies in the parish of Rath, 2 miles (3.2 km) southwest of Corofin. The demon badger killed both cattle and men and was not subdued by the prayers of six local saints. The monster was lulled to sleep while Blathmac went with 1,200 followers to seek help from Mac Creiche, whom he found with his disciple Mainchín and his bell, the Finnfaidech. Mac Creiche asked for the promise of a perpetual tribute to himself and to his relics before he would come.

Mac Creiche arrived after three days. He was accompanied by Mainchín, who carried the bell. The monster, as high as a tall tree, had awoken and was pursuing and killing the people, discharging balls of fire from its mouth. In the contest that followed a ball of fire from Mac Chreich's bell shot into the monster's maw and set it on fire. The saint drove the monster into the waters of the lake, which turned red. The monster rose up again, embarrassing Mac Creiche, who took his cowl (or possibly his cap) and threw it over the monster. The cowl grew so it was "like a cowl of smelted iron" that pressed the monster to the lake bed. The monster would not arise again until the eve of Judgement Day. (Note: Some local people say the saint allowed the monster a day of freedom every seven years, and it was seen in 1931.) Mac Creiche accepted the thanks of the people but warned that if they did not pay the promised tribute they would be cursed with disease, pestilence and internal strife.

Another version of the legend says Ireland was afflicted by a plague called Crom Chonnaill. The men of Kerry (his kinsmen, the Cíarraige) invited Mac Creiche to meet them in Ulster to turn the plague away from them. Three sons of the brother of MacCreiche's mother came from the east, but were felled by the Crom Chonnaill. When Mac Creiche saw this he raised his Finn Faidheach bell, and soon after the Crom Chonnaill was destroyed by a bolt from heaven. It was common at the time for a plague to be personified as a monster.

=== Other tales ===
Other stories tell of Mac Creiche winning back plunder and hostages from robbers, and having an unjust tribute remitted. The saint was asked by the people of Tuadhmhumhain and Corca Modhruah to come to Carn Mic Táil to advise them about a cattle tribute that the king of Connacht was exacting. He agreed at once and came with Mainchín. They stopped at Tomfinlough, where they persuaded Luchtigern to join them. They found the tribes of Corcomroe waiting for them at Cairn-mic-Táil near Ennistymon. After much discussion, it was decided to make Mac Creiche the tribe's ambassador to the king to demand the return of their property.

The saints went on and met the druids of the king of Connaught at Magh Aoi, whom Mac Creiche defeated. The king of Connacht still refused to surrender his spoils. Mac Creiche was disheartened and went to spend the night on the field at Magh Aoi. He was seized with thirst, and wished that the king would have a greater thirst. Sure enough, the king became so thirsty that no drink could satisfy him. He came to Mac Creiche and offered to submit himself and his heirs to the saint in return for relief. Mac Creiche struck his staff on the ground and a spring of water broke forth, which satisfied the king and became a holy well.

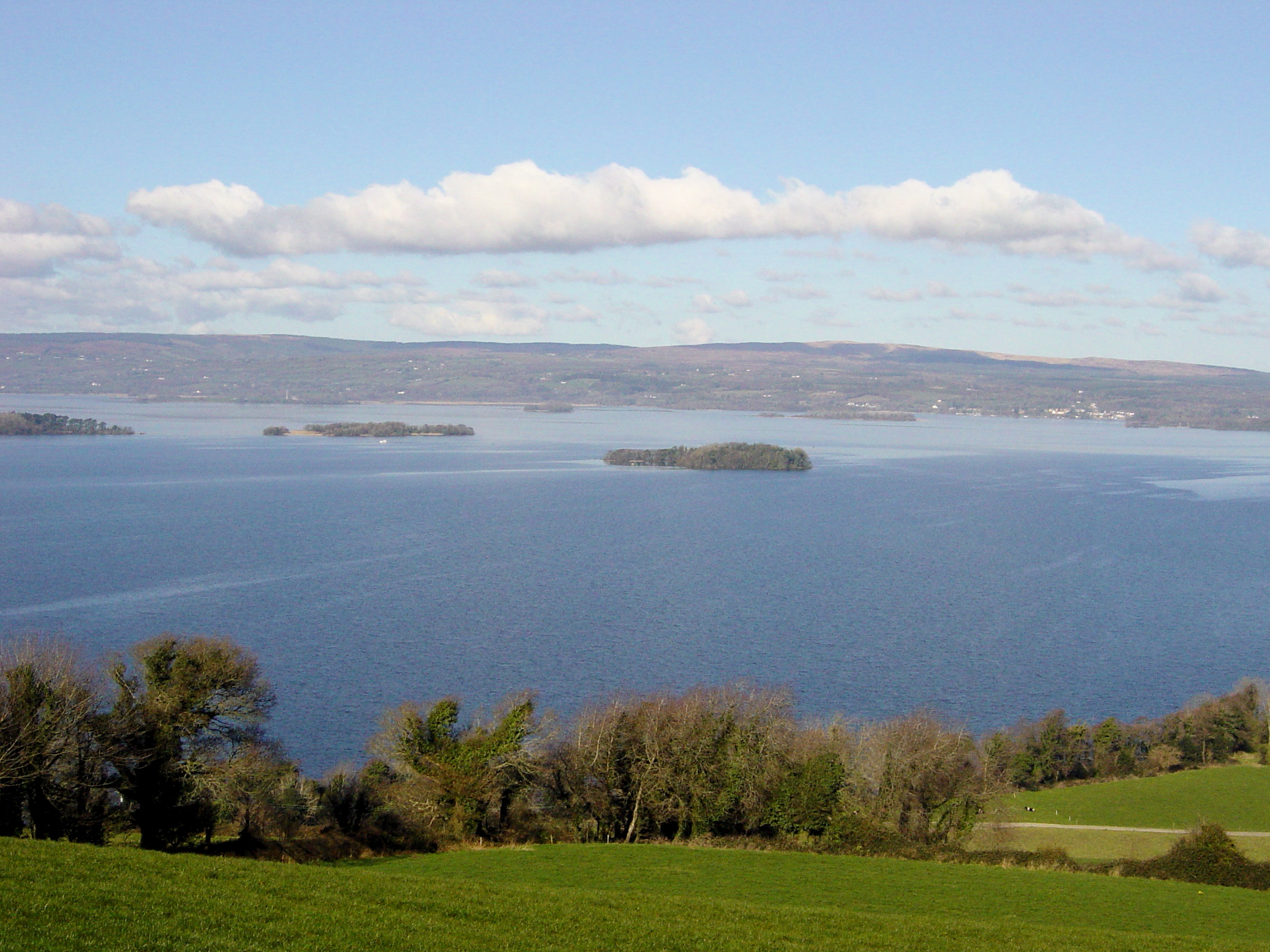
Mac Creiche lived on Inis Cealtra, an island in Lough Derg

Mac Creiche is linked with Inis Cealtra, an island in Lough Derg. Saint Columba of Terryglass visited him there, where he found a tree whose sap had the taste of honey and the intoxicating qualities of wine. An angel told Mac Creiche to leave the island and find another place for his hermitage.

== Historicity ==
There is a life of Mac Creiche, the Betha Meic Creiche. It is written in Middle Irish, and probably dates from the 11th or 12th century. The surviving manuscript was copied in 1634 from an earlier manuscript of 1528. Mac Creiche is mentioned in accounts of Columba of Terryglass, Ailbe of Emly and Enda of Aran. He is the subject of a quatrain in a poem said to have been written by Cuimmín of Conor about the Irish saints.

However, there is no historical evidence that Mac Creiche existed and much that suggests he was mythological. The tale of the eviction of Mac Creiche from Inishcealtra, the island with what sounds like a sacred tree, may refer to Christians taking a pagan sanctuary. The antiquarian Thomas Johnson Westropp says that Mac Creiche's feast day was Garland Sunday, but was actually held on 11 August. On the sole basis of the date, Mac Creiche has been identified with Saint Mochta of Louth. However, Garland Sunday was also the date of the pagan festival of the Irish god Lugh.

"Mac Creiche" may be translated "Son of Plunder". He travelled in a chariot with his companion Mainchín, defeated the enemies of the Corcu MoDruad and the Cíarraige, and fought a monster. This all suggests that the Betha Mac Creiche was originally the saga of a pagan tribal hero, the son of a god and a mortal woman. Stories similar to that of Mac Creiche's fetter and key are told of other figures. Saint Patrick is said to have commanded a wicked tyrant called Macuil moccu Greccae to fasten his feet with a fetter, throw the key into the sea, and let a coracle carry him away to a new land, where he should live a good life. Macuil moccu Greccae was so evil he was called Cyclops. From this it appears that Macuil is the old Irish god Mac Cuill. Mac Creiche may well be the same person, his name a corruption of "moccu Greccae".

== Traces ==
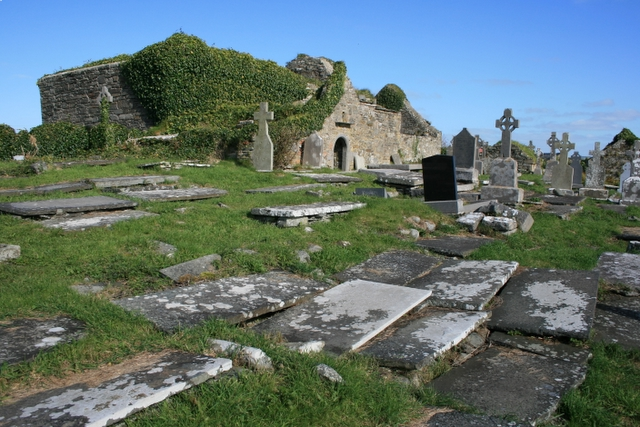
The ruined Kilmacreehy Church and its graveyard

Mac Creiche was said to have founded several churches in County Clare, but only Cill Mic Creiche (Kilmacrehy) is named after him. The church of "Kilmaccrik" is mentioned in the Papal Taxation of 1302. The ruins of the old church lie near the village of Liscannor. There was a holy well near the church dedicated to MacCreiche, but the nearby well of the more famous Saint Brigit of Kildare drew many more visitors in the 19th century. Mac Creiche is said to have founded the church of Teampull na glas Aighne near Inagh. Some remains of this building could still be seen in 1839. He also founded the church of Cill Scanbotha, nearby to the west.

Two rocks on the strand of Kilmacrehy, visible when the tide is out, are called "'Mac Creiche's Bed". Locals say that the saint asked for his coffin to be set on the shore where the tide would carry it out, and for it to be buried when it was washed in again.

== Sources ==
- Archdall, Mervyn (1873). Moran, PF (ed.). Monasticon Hibernicum: or, An history of the abbeys, priories, and other religious houses in Ireland.
- Conglinne, Mac (1939). "How Mac Creiche Slew the Yellow Pest". Mediaeval Pageant. Ardent Media. GGKEY:TJEEPR7TL6D.
- De Paor, Liam (1979). "Saint Mac Creiche of Liscannor". Ériu. 30. Royal Irish Academy: 93–121. JSTOR 30007682.
- FitzPatrick, Elizabeth (2004). Royal Inauguration in Gaelic Ireland c. 1100–1600: A Cultural Landscape Study. Boydell Press. ISBN 978-1-84383-090-0.
- Frost, James (1893). The History and Topography of the County of Clare: From the Earliest Times to the Beginning of the 18th Century. James Frost. p. 191.
- Gibson, D. Blair (27 August 2012). From Chiefdom to State in Early Ireland. Cambridge University Press. ISBN 978-1-107-01563-0.
- Harbison, Peter (1 April 1995). Pilgrimage in Ireland: The Monuments and the People. Syracuse University Press. ISBN 978-0-8156-0312-2.
- Kelly, Matthew (1857). Calendar of Irish saints, the martyrology of Tallagh, with notices of the patron saints of Ireland, and select poems and hymns. J. Mullany. p. 167.
- G, L (March 1917). "The History and Antiquities of Inis Cealtra by R. A. S. Macalister". Studies: An Irish Quarterly Review. 6 (21). Irish Province of the Society of Jesus. JSTOR 30082711.
- Lenihan, Edmund; Lenihan, Eddie (2008). In the Tracks of the West Clare Railway. Mercier Press. ISBN 978-1-85635-579-7.
- Maclagan, Robert Craig (1882). Scottish Myths: Notes on Scottish History and Tradition. Maclachlan & Stewart. p. 178.
- O'Curry, Eugene (1873). Lectures. Vol. 2. Williams & Norgate.
- O'Curry, Eugene (1878). Lectures on the Manuscript Materials of Ancient Irish History: Delivered at the Catholic University of Ireland, During the Sessions of 1855 and 1856. William A. Hinch. p. 631.
- Riches, Samantha (2011). "Exemplary Encounters". Saints and Sanctity. DS Brewer. ISBN 978-0-9546809-8-5.
- Smith, Robert Angus (1885). Loch Etive and the sons of Uisnach. A. Gardner. p. 242.
- Westropp, Thomas Johnson (1905). "Ancient Remains Near Lehinch, Co. Clare: St. Maccreehy" (PDF). Journal of the Limerick Field Club.
- Westropp, Thomas Johnson (1910). "A Folklore Survey of County Clare IX. Supernatural Animals". Folk-Lore. 21. doi:10.1080/0015587X.1910.9720541.
