= Dealagh River =

River in Ireland

Coordinates: 52°57′29″N 9°19′40″W

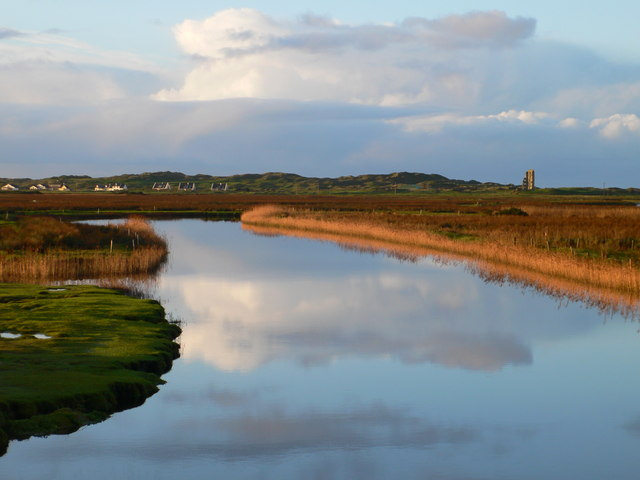
The Dealagh at New Bridge

The Dealagh is a river of County Clare, western Ireland. It converges with the Inagh River at Lahinch Golf Course and flows into Liscannor Bay at Lahinch. The river is popular with anglers fishing trout between March and September.
