= O'Brien's Castle =

O'Brien's Castle may refer to:

- O'Brien's Castle (Inisheer)
- Dromore Castle (County Clare)
- A castle near to Dough Castle
- Any other castle associated with the O'Brien dynasty
