= Liscannor (parish) =

- Roman Catholic parish
- Location in Ireland
- Coordinates: 52°56′19″N 9°23′38″W
- Country: Ireland
- Province: Munster
- County: County Clare

Government
  - Dáil Éireann: Clare
- Time zone: UTC+0 (WET)
  - Summer (DST): UTC-1 (IST (WEST))

Liscannor parish is a parish in County Clare, Ireland, and part of the Kilfenora Deanery of the Roman Catholic Diocese of Galway, Kilmacduagh and Kilfenora. It is bordering the Atlantic Ocean.

Current (2021) parish priest is Denis Crosby.

The parish is an amalgamation of the mediaeval parishes of Kilmacrehy and Killaspuglonnane.

The main church of the parish is the Church of St. Bridget in Liscannor, built in 1858 on the site of an older church. The second church of the parish is the Church of St. Flannan in Moymore. This church was built in 1877.
