= Liscannor =

Coastal village in County Clare, Ireland

Liscannor Irish: Lios Ceannúir
- Village
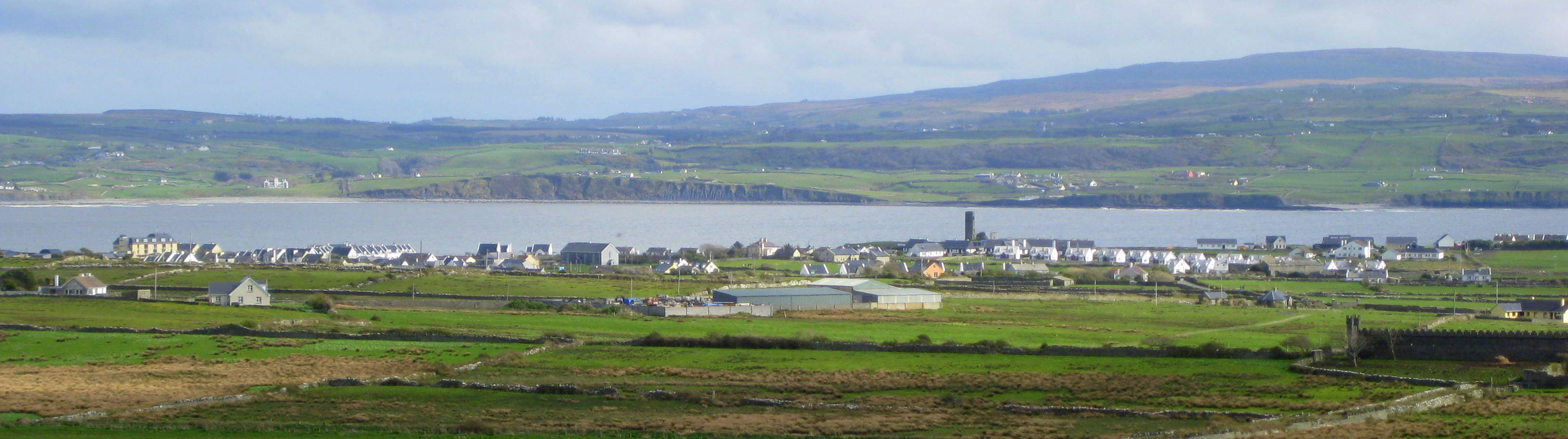
- Panoramic view of Liscannor

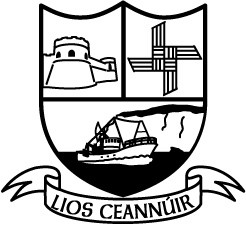
- Seal

- Location in Ireland
- Coordinates: 52°56′19″N 9°23′38″W
- Country: Ireland
- Province: Munster
- County: County Clare

Population (2022)
  - Total: 135
- Time zone: UTC+0 (WET)
  - Summer (DST): UTC-1 (IST (WEST))
- Irish grid reference: R064884

Historical population
Year	Pop.	±%
1821	315	—
1831	506	+60.6%
1841	562	+11.1%
1851	429	−23.7%
1861	394	−8.2%
1871	415	+5.3%
1881	321	−22.7%
1891	286	−10.9%
1901	251	−12.2%
1911	242	−3.6%
1926	217	−10.3%
1936	183	−15.7%
1946	170	−7.1%
1951	146	−14.1%
1956	139	−4.8%
1961	106	−23.7%
1966	94	−11.3%
2002	108	+14.9%
2011	128	+18.5%
2016	113	−11.7%
2022	135	+19.5%

Liscannor (Irish: Lios Ceannúir, meaning 'ringfort of Ceannúr') is a coastal village in County Clare, Ireland. It is located between Lahinch and Doolin, close to the Cliffs of Moher. As of the 2022 census it had a population of 135.

== Geography ==
Lying on the west coast of Ireland, on Liscannor Bay, the village is located on the R478 regional road between Lahinch, to the east, and Doolin, to the north. The Cliffs of Moher are about 5 km (3.1 mi) north west of the village. Between Lahinch and Liscannor lies the small village of Moymore. Liscannor is located in the civil parish of Kilmacrehy.

== History ==
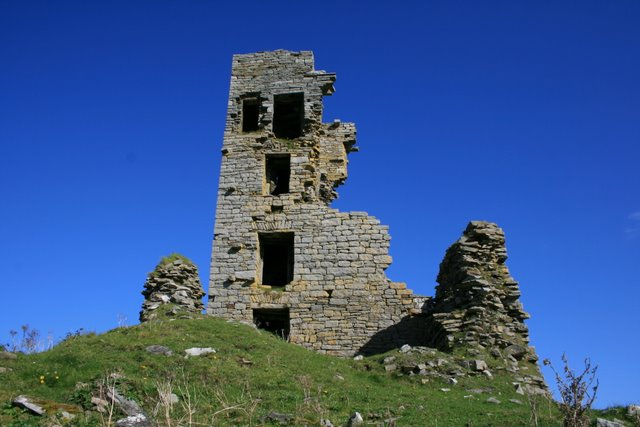
Liscannor Castle

Liscannor probably takes its name from an old fort that was located here. Lis meaning 'fort' and Cannor a corruption of the name "Connor".

The area around Liscannor was part of the Barony of Corcomroe, controlled by the O'Connor family.

At least 30 ships of the Spanish Armada, sent to invade England in the summer of 1588, were lost along the coast of Ireland, mainly along the western seaboard. The oar-powered galleass Zuñiga was damaged, and anchored off-shore of Liscannor. The ship came under surveillance by the High Sheriff of Clare and by crown forces, and those Spanish sailors who had come ashore had to withdraw to their ship. One captive was taken and sent for interrogation. The Zuñiga escaped the coast with favorable winds, and later reached Le Havre.

The village of Liscannor is of late 18th century origin. According to an 1814 survey there were nearly 200 houses in it at the time, and about ten of them had flag roofs. 40 houses were used by fishermen.

Whilst there was once a Gaeltacht (Irish-speaking area) around Liscannor, by 1956 the loss of native speakers meant that it could no longer be considered as such.

== Points of interest ==
=== Cliffs of Moher ===
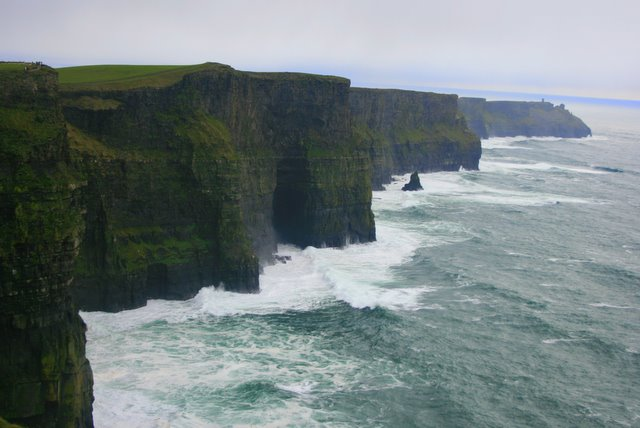
Cliffs of Moher

The Cliffs of Moher are one of Ireland's top visitor attractions, and include a protected colony of cliff-nesting seabirds. The area was designated as a Refuge for Fauna in 1988, and as a Special Protection Area for Birds (SPA) under the EU Birds Directive in 1989.

=== Kilmacreehy Church and graveyard ===
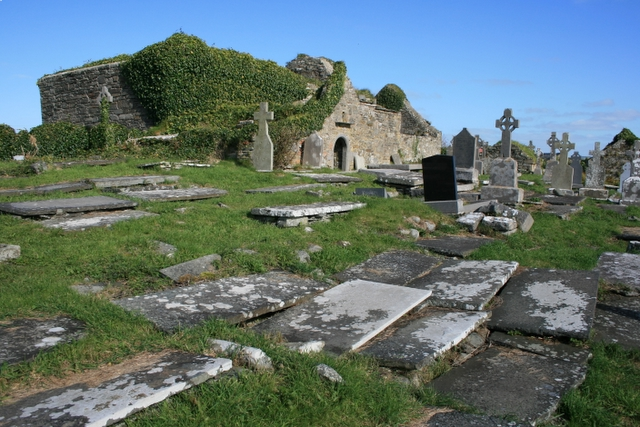
Kilmacreehy Church

Cill MacCreiche (Kilmacreehy Church) is first documented in the 14th century, but some of the church's structures, including its Gothic ornamentation, are later additions.

=== Liscannor Castle ===
Liscannor Castle was an O'Connor stronghold which, like Dough Castle, later passed to the O'Briens. In 1712, the Earl of Thomond let the estate to William Fitzgerald (annual rent £14). Under the Fitzgerald family, the town began to grow in the later 18th century.

The ruined remains include a six-story tower with a spiral stairway to the east and a lower main building next to it. This latter was described in some detail by Thomas Johnson Westropp in the late 19th century, who noted that it had five floors.

=== St. Brigid's Well ===
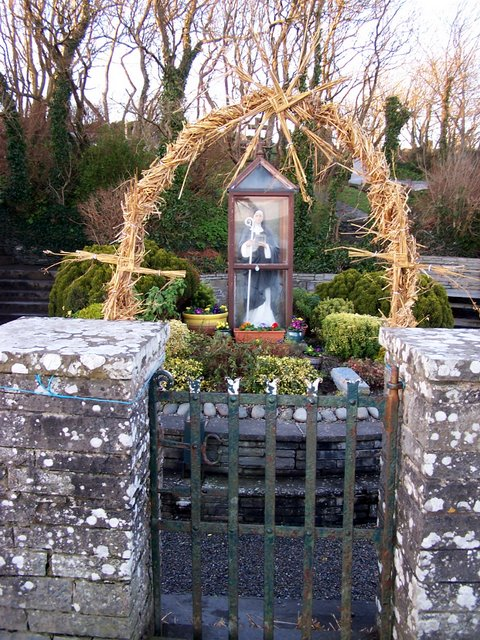
Entrance to St. Brigids Well

Located at a site of pre-Christian Lughnasadh celebrations, Dabhach Bhríde (or Brigid's Vat) is located near the Cliffs of Moher. Behind the well, on a higher level to which steps lead, is an ancient cemetery. There is a large cross here and a circular path around it, and part of the Rite of the Holy Well is performed in this area known as the Ula Uachtarach or upper sanctuary.

The well, dedicated to Brigid of Kildare, is in the lower ground, the Ula íochtarach or lower sanctuary, enclosed in a little house which contains votive offerings left by pilgrims.

The well has been a pilgrimage site since at least the 1830s, when following a personal cure which he attributed to the waters of the well, Cornelius O'Brien had the well house built. Pilgrims from elsewhere in County Clare and from the Aran Islands came to Liscannor. Pattern Days on which large groups attended included St Brigid's Day (1 February) and Garland Sunday (late July).

=== Liscannor Harbour ===
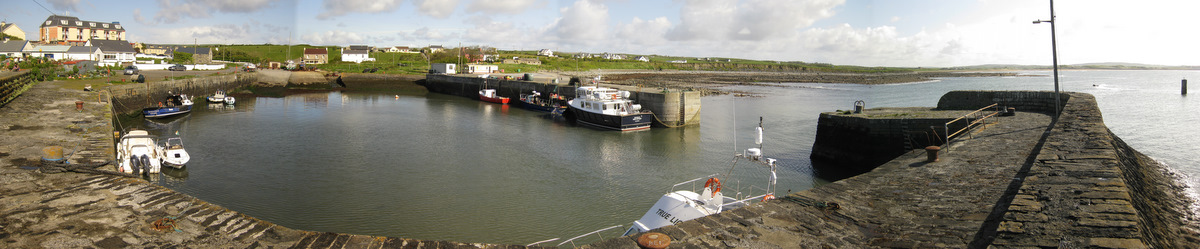
Panoramic view of Liscannor Harbour

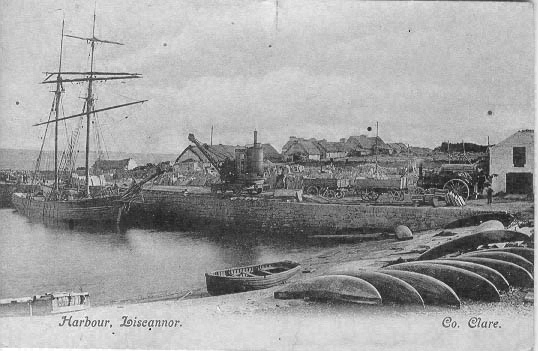
Old photo of Liscannor Harbour

The harbour was built between 1825 and 1831 for £2,900, of which £2,000 was a government grant.

In modern times, the harbour has a number of fishing vessels moored there as well as smaller boats using it is a launching site for sea fishing/recreational sports. During summer months there is also a ferry service to the base of the Cliffs of Moher as well as to the Aran Islands.

In the past the harbour was a hub for fishing vessels as well as a location to export locally quarried Liscannor Stone and to receive in coal supplies. Some historical documents note that due to the silting of the harbour, ships could only carry approximately 380 tonnes into port. At low tides ships had to be winched into harbour. A currach would bring the rope out to the ship. Locally quarried flag was cut and polished beside the harbour and winched onto ships by steam crane. These slabs were transported to several British cities.

=== John P. Holland memorials ===
The engineer John Philip Holland (1841–1914), who was born in Liscannor, developed some of the first submarines commissioned by the US Navy, Japanese Navy and Royal Navy. Castle Street, on which Holland was born, was renamed 'Holland Street' in his honour.

There are several memorials to Holland in the area, including one erected on the 50th anniversary of his death in 1964. A further memorial, donated by the Submarine Veterans of the US Navy, was erected in Liscannor in 1977.

A visitor centre, the John P. Holland Centre, opened in 2016. A statue of Holland, originally on public display on Liscannor's Main Street, was moved into the centre, alongside displays about his life and work with submarines.

== Churches ==
=== St. Brigid's Church ===
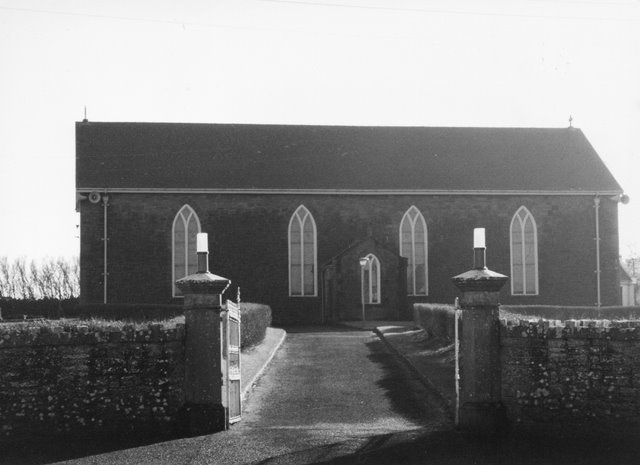
St. Brigids Church

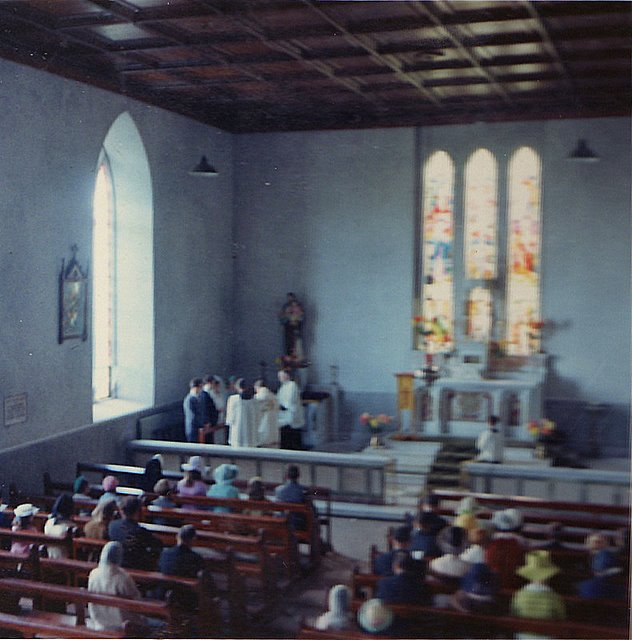
Inside of St. Brigids Church 1960s

St Brigid's Church in Liscannor was built in 1858. It is a single-cell, four-bay church built of rubble masonry. A new roof was later added but the gallery, y-mullioned windows and semi-Tudor door were retained. Although the construction of a round tower was suggested in the 1920s, this Touheran tower which would have housed the bell as well as cottage industries on the lower floors was never built.

Liscannor has been referred to as "the Pope's Own Parish". Located in the Diocese of Kilfenora, of which the Pope is the Bishop and the Bishop of Galway is the Apostolic Administrator, Liscannor is a mensal parish, i.e. directly under the direct authority of the bishop.

=== Moymore Church ===
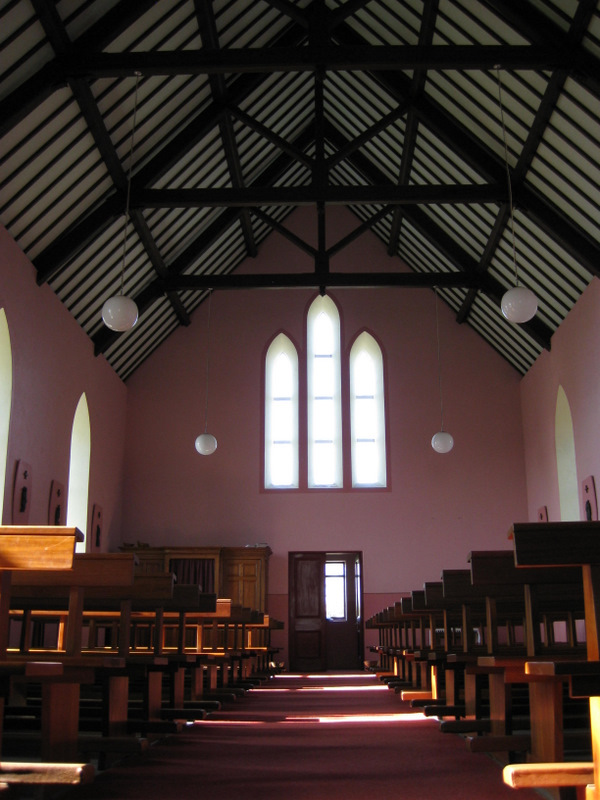
Interior of Moymore Church

The church of Moymore was built in 1877, on an elevated site overlooking the bay. There was no church previously at this location. Before that the people of the area attended Mass in a small thatched chapel a quarter mile to the east in Caheraderry (Derry).

=== Derry Church ===
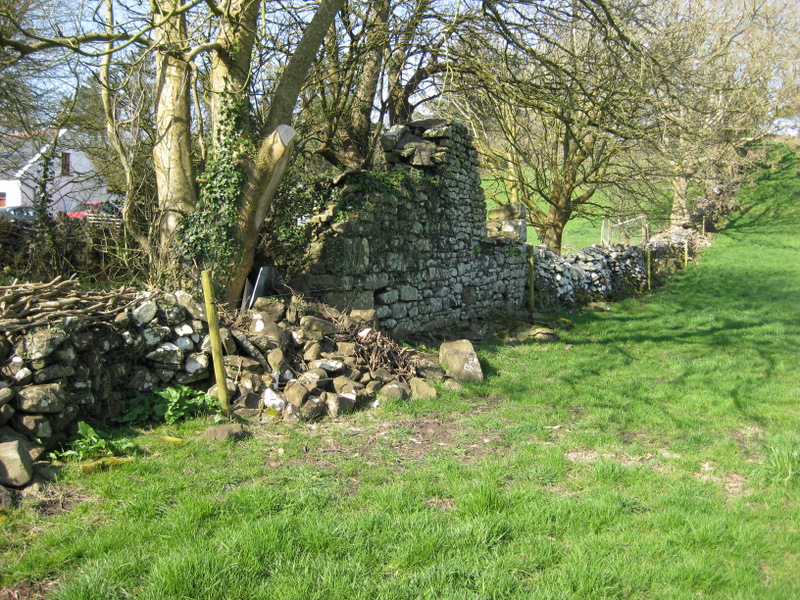
Derry Church Ruins

The Caheraderry (Derry) church probably dates from the 17th century penal times, built either to facilitate travelling friars or possibly as an out-chapel or hermitage for Kilmacreehy Church. Beside the ruins stand two small one-room attached cottages. According to local tradition, one of these cottages was a shebeen known as Gleeson's and the other a schoolhouse, where a hedge-schoolmaster taught.

== Infrastructure ==
=== Transport ===
Bus Éireann route 350 links Liscannor to several locations: Ennis, Ennistymon, Cliffs of Moher, Doolin, Lisdoonvarna and Galway. There are a number of journeys each way daily. Onward rail and bus connections are available at Ennis and Galway.

== Sports ==
=== Liscannor GAA ===
Liscannor won a county title in 1940 – with a combined team from the broader North Clare area. Liscannor GAA Club was reformed in 1985 as a separate entity after players from the area had played with The St Michaels team for a number of years. Liscannor were promoted to Intermediate ranks after winning the Junior title in their first year after reforming in 1985. Liscannor also won the league title in 1985. An intermediate title followed in 1988, but Liscannor were to revert to the Intermediate grade after one year at Senior level. It would be 12 years later, in 2000, before Liscannor returned to the Senior Grade.

=== Moher Celtic ===
Moher Celtic is the local football club. They have reached two Clare Cup finals in their history but have been edged out on both occasions.

== Notable people ==
- Cornelius O'Brien (1782–1857), Member of Parliament
- John Philip Holland (1840–1914), inventor of the modern submarine

== See also ==
- List of towns and villages in Ireland
