= Dan Lehane =

Member of the Irish Republican Army

Dan Lehane (died 26 September 1920) was a member of the Irish Republican Army (IRA) and one of the instigators of the Rineen Ambush in which six RIC policemen were killed. He was the brother of Patrick Lehane who was wounded in the reprisal that followed and then tied and thrown into a burning house. The Auxiliaries paid Dan Lehane a visit at his house at Cragg near Lahinch, where he was interrogated at gunpoint, but refused to inform the officers. Lehane was wounded and died four days later.
