= Inagh River =

River in County Clare, Ireland

Coordinates: 52°56′45″N 9°19′49″W

Inagh River Cullenagh River
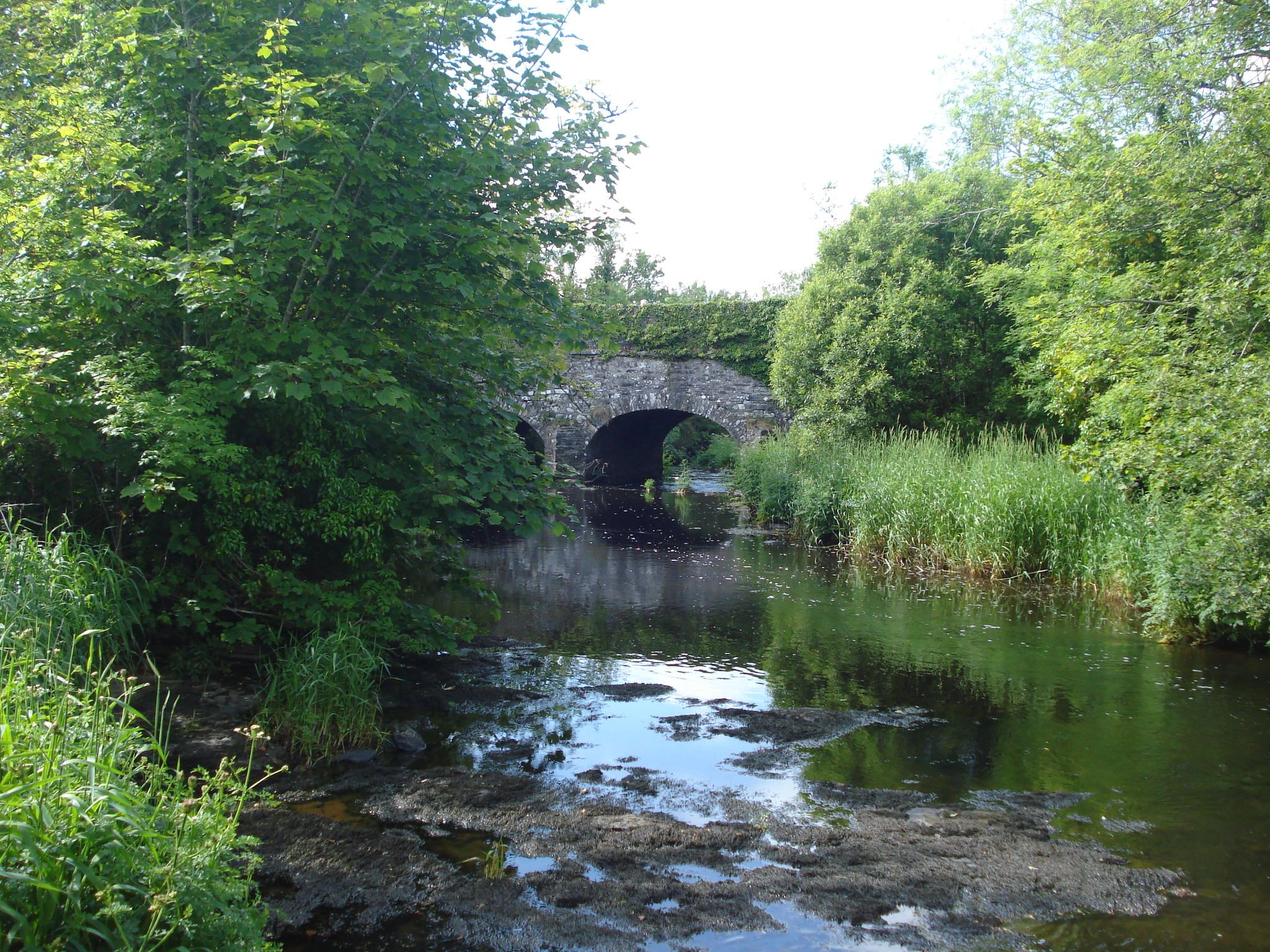
- R460 crossing the Inagh River
- Etymology: Irish eidhneach, "abounding in ivy"
- Native name: An Eidhneach (Irish)

Location
- Country: Ireland
- Settlements: Inagh, Ennistymon, Lahinch

Physical characteristics
- Source
  - location: Knockadangan, County Clare
- Mouth
  - location: Atlantic Ocean at Lahinch
- Length: 36.61 km (22.75 mi)
- Basin size: 168 km^{2} (65 sq mi)
- Discharge
  - average: 2.45 m^{3}/s (87 cu ft/s)

Basin features
- Tributaries
  - left: Dealagh River, Dumcullaun Lough
  - right: Lough Aconnaun

The Inagh River is a river of County Clare, western Ireland. It takes in the Dealagh River and flows into Liscannor Bay at Lahinch after flowing through Lahinch Golf Course. The ruins of Dough Castle lie on its banks on the golf course, as once also did O'Brien's Castle, and it is crossed by a bridge of the same name.

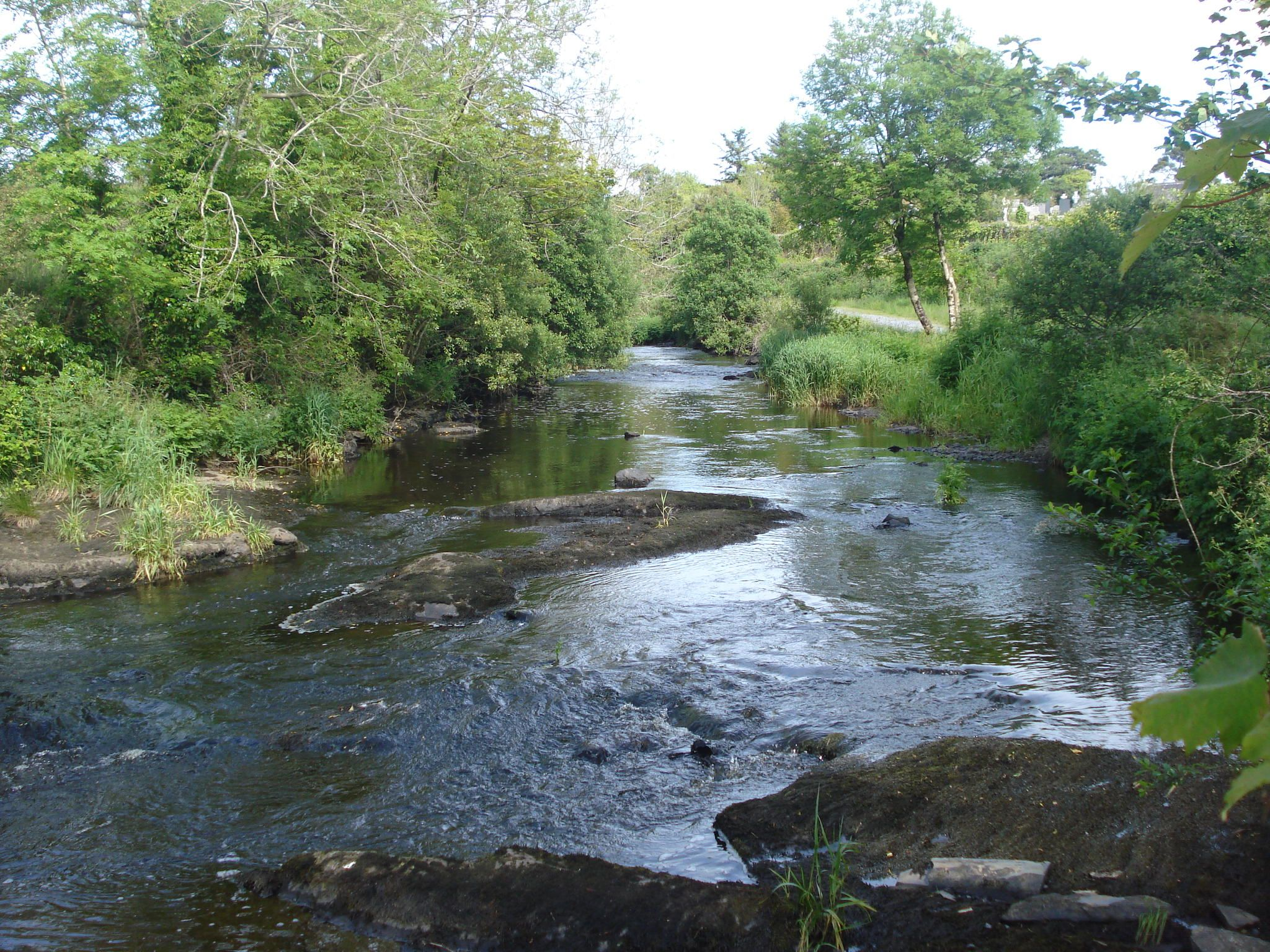
The Inagh river upstream
