= Rineen ambush =

Ambush during the Irish War of Independence

- Part of the Irish War of Independence
Date	22 September 1920
Location	Drummin Hill, County Clare 52.880°N 9.398°W
Result	IRA victory: Successful IRA ambush and getaway; Black and Tans reprisals on local civilians

Belligerents
Irish Republican Army (Mid Clare Brigade)	(United Kingdom of Great Britain and Ireland) Royal Irish Constabulary (United Kingdom) British Army

Commanders and leaders
Ignatius O'Neill	(United Kingdom of Great Britain and Ireland) Michael Hynes †

Strength
50 volunteers	6 officers 10 lorries of British troops (c. 100 men) arrived later

Casualties and losses
2 wounded	6 killed Several wounded
- 1 magistrate killed by IRA (in fact unrelated); 5 civilians killed 16 houses/shops destroyed in reprisal
- Location within island of Ireland

The Rineen ambush was an ambush carried out by the Mid Clare Brigade of the Irish Republican Army (IRA) on 22 September 1920, during the Irish War of Independence. The attack took place at Drummin Hill in the townland of Drummin, near the hamlet of Rineen (or Rinneen), County Clare.

The IRA's Mid-Clare Brigade attacked a Royal Irish Constabulary (RIC) lorry, killing six officers. Shortly afterwards, the IRA encountered ten lorry-loads of British Army soldiers, who had been sent out on a separate patrol looking for a missing magistrate. However, the IRA held off this attack long enough to flee the scene in an orderly retreat and sustained only two wounded.

In reprisal for the ambush, the RIC Auxiliaries and British military raided three local villages, killed five civilians and burnt 16 houses and shops in the surrounding area.

== Background ==
The Volunteers in County Clare had been active since 1917 and by late 1920 had forced the RIC to abandon most of its small rural barracks in the county. This gave the IRA greater freedom to move in the countryside. In August 1920, the RIC were reinforced by the British deployment of Black and Tans and Auxiliaries to the county. Five RIC men, eleven IRA volunteers and four civilians had been killed in County Clare during the two years before the ambush.

The Rineen Ambush was ordered by the leadership of the IRA's Mid Clare Brigade, who had noticed that an RIC lorry travelled every week on the Ennistymon to Milltown Malbay road. John Joe Neylon (the leader of the local IRA battalion) was put in charge, although the actual attack was led by Ignatius O'Neill, the Officer Commanding. He was a veteran of World War I who had formerly fought with the Irish Guards. The ambush party had only nine rifles and some grenades, the remainder being armed with shotguns or handguns. They prepared to attack the lorry from a boreen that overlooked the road at Rineen.

== Magistrate Lendrum ==
As the IRA party was lying in wait, Alan Lendrum, the local resident magistrate, unwittingly drove into a roadblock manned by the IRA's West Clare Brigade, in an unrelated incident. He was stopped at a railway crossing at Caherfeenick near Doonbeg. When the IRA demanded he leave his car and surrender it to them, he drew an automatic pistol; the IRA responded by shooting him twice in the head, fatally wounding him. After his death, the IRA weighted his body with stones and dumped it in a nearby lake. Even though a subsequent British military inquest had established that Lendrum had died of gunshot wounds, members of the RIC in Clare spread a false version of events and claimed that Lendrum had died of drowning.

Although in strict military sense not related to the ambush (the three battalions in County Clare operated independently), it had serious consequences for the ambush. It was quite quickly noticed that the magistrate was missing and the British military authorities Ennistymon decided to send out a search party of ten lorries of soldiers.

== Ambush ==
The RIC lorry passed safely through the ambush position, travelling from Ennistymon to Milltown Malbay, due to some confusion among the IRA over the numbers they faced. However, when they learned that there was only one lorry, it was attacked on its return journey from Milltown Malbay. The lorry was hit by a grenade and blasted at close range by rifle and shotgun fire. The shooting was over in seconds, with five out of the six RIC men being killed outright. The sixth man managed to run about 300 yards before being shot dead.

Five of the dead were Irish RIC officers and one was an English Black and Tan. The IRA took their weapons and burned the lorry.

Not long after the lorry had been set ablaze, ten more lorries of British Army troops arrived on the scene. They had been sent out to search for Alan Lendrum, the magistrate who had gone missing earlier that day. A running fight ensued as four IRA riflemen kept the troops at bay while the other volunteers made their escape in an orderly retreat. Two IRA volunteers and several British soldiers were wounded in the firing. Padraic O'Farrell lists the casualties as three British soldiers killed, but this is not confirmed by the other sources.

== Reprisals ==
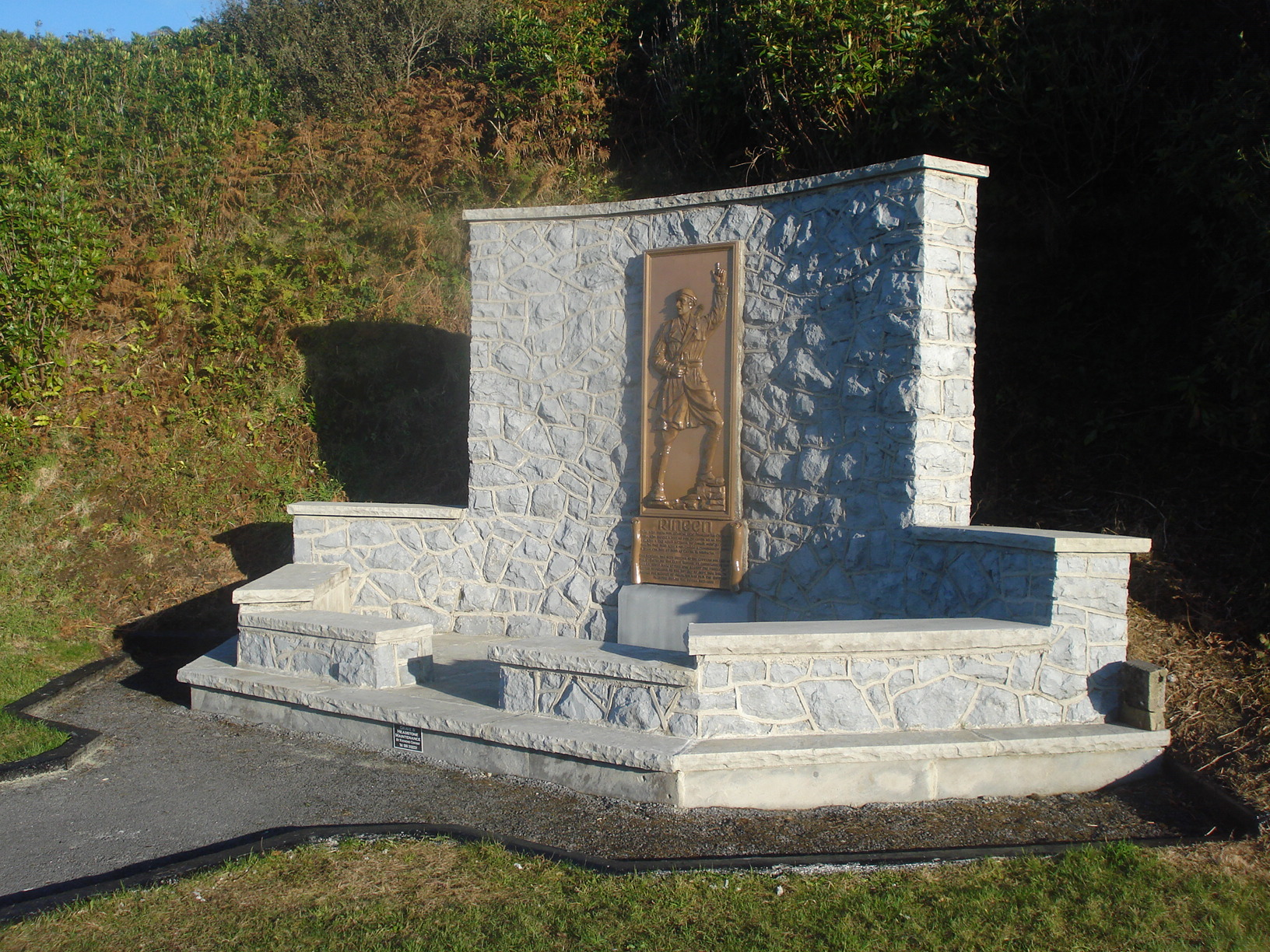
A memorial to those killed by British forces in reprisal for the ambush

The British forces, enraged by the ambush and the escape of the IRA force, took out reprisals on civilians in the surrounding area. Immediately after the action ended, they burned the house and farm of the O'Gorman family and shot a local farmer, Sean Keane. He later died of his wounds.

That night, a mixed force of police and soldiers raided the home of Dan Lehane, whose two sons had taken part in the ambush. They shot him dead and burned his house at Lahinch. Patrick Lehane was burned to death in the attic when the house was set alight. Several other houses were burned in Lahinch and a further eight were razed in Milltown Malbay.

A separate RIC raid took place in Ennistymon, in which several homes and businesses were burned. In this raid they killed Tom Connole, the secretary of the local ITGWU trade union, and burned his home. PJ Linnane, a 15-year-old boy, was also shot dead by the police.

In what may have been a belated reprisal for the ambush, four IRA men were arrested by the Auxiliaries at Killaloe on 16 November, beaten, interrogated and then shot dead. Another two were summarily executed in the same way on 22 December at Kilkee.

== Reactions ==
The reprisals were condemned in the British, Irish and international press. In the House of Commons, the British Labour Party tabled a resolution condemning the reprisals and calling for an investigation. This was defeated by 346 votes to 79. Hamar Greenwood, the Chief Secretary for Ireland, defended the State Forces' actions, saying that the houses destroyed were those of, "notorious Sinn Féiners... I am convinced that the people of those two villages knew of this ambush".

In Clare itself, according to IRA man Anthony Malone, the ambush had two effects. One was that the RIC became careful to travel in convoys of no less than three lorries. The other was that, as a result of the reprisals, the civilian population "became embittered against [the British] and adopted a more defiant attitude to the [British] military and Black and Tans".

The death of Resident Magistrate Alan Lendrum, however, according to pro-republican Catholic priest Sean Gaynor, "was not to our credit". On 1 October, the local IRA removed Lendrum's body from the lake, put it in a roughly constructed coffin and left it on the railway tracks at Craggaknock railway station for British forces to find.

== Memorial ==
On 22 September 1957, a cut stone monument depicting an IRA soldier in uniform was unveiled by Rev. Dr. Rodgers, Bishop of Killaloe, at Drummin Hill where the ambush took place. The memorial cost just over £1200 to erect, and was financed by subscriptions from the United States, alongside donations from veterans of the War of Independence and members of the public. Coinciding with the 37th Anniversary of the ambush, the memorial was erected by the veterans of the 4th battalion of the Mid-Clare brigade. In attendance at the unveiling were Ignatius O'Neill, who delivered a short address, Dr. Patrick Hillary, and Rev. T. Canon O' Reilly, who blessed the monument. On the day, Dr. Rogers commented on the importance of the memorial in inspiring those of the future to build on the legacy of the War of Independence.

On 19 September 1965, custody of the memorial was given to the FCA, the first memorial in County Clare to be accepted by the organisation at the time.

The memorial continues to be the focal point for local commemorations of the Rineen Ambush. In recent years, families of former British soldiers were invited to take part in these commemorations. For example on the 90th anniversary ceremony the TD Minister of Defence Tony Killeen talked about how such events were not sectarian and welcomed descendants of the six RIC members who were killed in the Ambush.

A subdued commemoration was held on the 100th anniversary of the event, due to Covid-19 restrictions in place at that time. As part of this commemoration, a plaque in honor of those who died 100 years earlier, was unveiled at Flanagans' bar in Lahinch. In particular, the plaque pays tribute to volunteer, and local man Pakie Lehane, who died following reprisals by British forces, following the Rineen ambush. A deferred 100th anniversary commemoration of the event was held on 22 September 2023. The main address for this event was given by then Tánaiste Micheál Martin. The commemoration ceremonies involved unveiling a plaque to Commandant Ignatius O'Neill, commanding officer during the ambush, on Milltown Malbay's main street.
