= Dough Castle =

Ruined tower house in County Clare, Ireland

Coordinates: 52°57′4″N 9°21′2″W

- Dumhach Uí Chonchuir
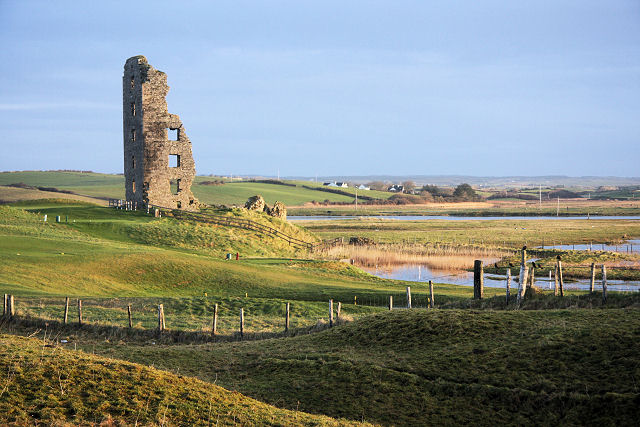
- Dough Castle ruins

General information
- Status: in ruins
- Type: tower house
- Location: Lahinch, Ireland

Dough Castle (Irish: Dumhach Ui Chonchuir – "sandbank of the O'Connors") is a ruined tower house at Lahinch in County Clare, western Ireland. It was established by the O'Conors in the early 14th century, but nothing remains of the original structures.

== Geography ==
Dough Castle is located in the townland of Dough in the civil parish of Kilmacrehy, County Clare. It lies to the south of the combined estuary of the Inagh and Dealagh rivers.

== History ==
The castle was originally established by the O’Connors, then lords of Corcomroe, in 1306. It served as their principal stronghold and was sited at the strategically important mouth of the Inagh River, where it could control both land and water traffic. A castle here is mentioned in 1422, but all the structures that survive today are of later origin.

In 1471, the chieftain was murdered in the castle by his nephews and was buried at the end of what is now the main street of Lahinch. A cairn was erected in his memory, and this gave rise to the official Irish name for Lahinch, Leacht Ui Chonchuir, or "O'Connor’s Cairn".

In 1584 it was held by the family of Sir Donal O'Brien. one of whom, Daniel, gave "hospitable and humane" shelter to English settlers who were threatened by the Irish rebellion of 1641.

In return for his actions, Dough castle was spared from being demolished or slighted by the Cromwellian army. In 1654, Cromwellian officer Colonel Stubber saved the castle from demolition, and in 1675 the castle still had the full tower with a two-storey house (it was described as a tall battlemented tower with a large two-storey dwelling house attached to one side). Large windows with flat arches and slab lintels replaced the older slit windows.

The present ruin is the result of various collapses due to the castle having been built upon sandbanks. One side had fallen before 1839, and a considerable mass, with the chimney, fell in 1883. These sandbanks were reported to be the home of Donn Dumhach (Donn of the sandhills), a sí prince who according to tradition still haunts the scene. The sandhill near the bridge is also reported to be haunted. No trace has been found of a supposed underground passage, filled with valuables, leading from the castle to Liscannor.

== Today ==
Due to poor foundations on sand, the castle collapsed several times and today it is in ruins, with little more than part of the O'Brien tower remaining on Lahinch Golf Course near where the Dealagh joins the Inagh River. There was another castle in the vicinity, O'Brien's Castle, built by Turlough O'Brien of the O'Brien clan in 1588 to defend against the Spanish, but nothing remains of this fortress.
