= Liscannor Bay =

Bay in Ireland

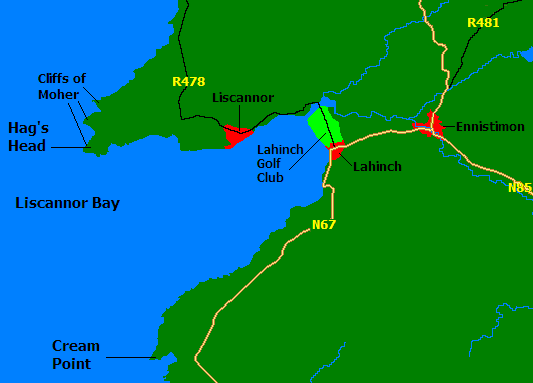

- Location within Ireland
- Coordinates: 52°55′14″N 9°25′26″W

Liscannor Bay is a bay on the west coast of Ireland in County Clare. Hag's Head provides the northern border for the bay and Cream Point is the southern boundary. The village of Liscannor is located on the north side of the bay, while the village of Lahinch is on the eastern end of the bay.

The Dealagh River and the Inagh River unite on the east side of the Lahinch Golf Club and enter Liscannor Bay together. The N67 and the R478 combine to outline the bay by road. The Cliffs of Moher begin at Hag's Head and run north along the coast.
