= Padraic O'Farrell =

Irish author (1932–2003)

Padraic O'Farrell (26 March 1932 – 6 November 2003) was an Irish book author, arts critic, playwright, historian, newspaper columnist, essayist, songwriter, theatrical director and theatrical producer. He had at least 33 books (40 according to his obituary) to his credit at the time of his death, with several more slated for release.

== Biography ==
Padraic O'Farrell was born in Staplestown, Donadea, County Kildare. He went to Knockbeg College in County Carlow and briefly studied engineering at University College Dublin before joining the Army Cadets. He subsequently became a full colonel.

He married his wife Maureen in 1956 and they had four children: Aisling, Declan, Niamh and Noel.

== Works ==
O'Farrell's writings were first published in An Cosantoir, the Army magazine, while he was in the military. Most of his books concerned Irish history and Irish folklore and folkways.

O'Farrell's books bearing on Irish history include The Ernie O'Malley Story (1983), The Burning of Brinsley MacNamara (1990), about the controversy surrounding the publication of The Valley of the Squinting Windows; The Blacksmith of Ballinalee (1993), a biography of Sean Mac Eoin; the best-selling Rebel Heart (1996), a fictional account of Michael Collins's love affair with Kitty Kiernan; Who's Who in the Irish War of Independence and Civil War: 1916-23 (1997); and The '98 Reader: An Anthology of Song, Ballads, Prose and Poetry (1998), a collection of accounts of the Irish Rebellion of 1798.

O'Farrell's published work on Irish folklore and other aspects of traditional culture include How the Irish Speak English (1980), Before the Devil Knows You're Dead: Irish Blessings, Toasts, and Curses (1993), Ancient Irish Legends (2001) and Irish Folk Cures (2004).

O'Farrell was heavily engaged with the theatre. He contributed news and reviews of theatrical productions and the arts to numerous magazines and newspapers, including The Irish Times and the Irish Examiner. He wrote scripts for leading Irish actresses Maureen Potter, Maureen Toal, Eileen Colgan and Anna Manahan, and, together with his wife, wrote, directed and produced dozens of plays and revues in County Westmeath. His touring theater company, Lyncairn Theatre, staged popular drama across Ireland. His play Kitty was about the women in the lives of Michael Collins and Sean Mac Eoin, and his play Matchmaking, based on the work of John B. Keane, dramatised the 1798 Rebellion. O'Farrell's book Green and Chaste and Foolish: Irish Literary and Theatrical Anecdotes (1994) is about prominent figures in Irish theatrical and literary milieux.
