= Lahinch =

Seaside town in County Clare, Ireland

Lahinch Irish: An Leacht
- Town
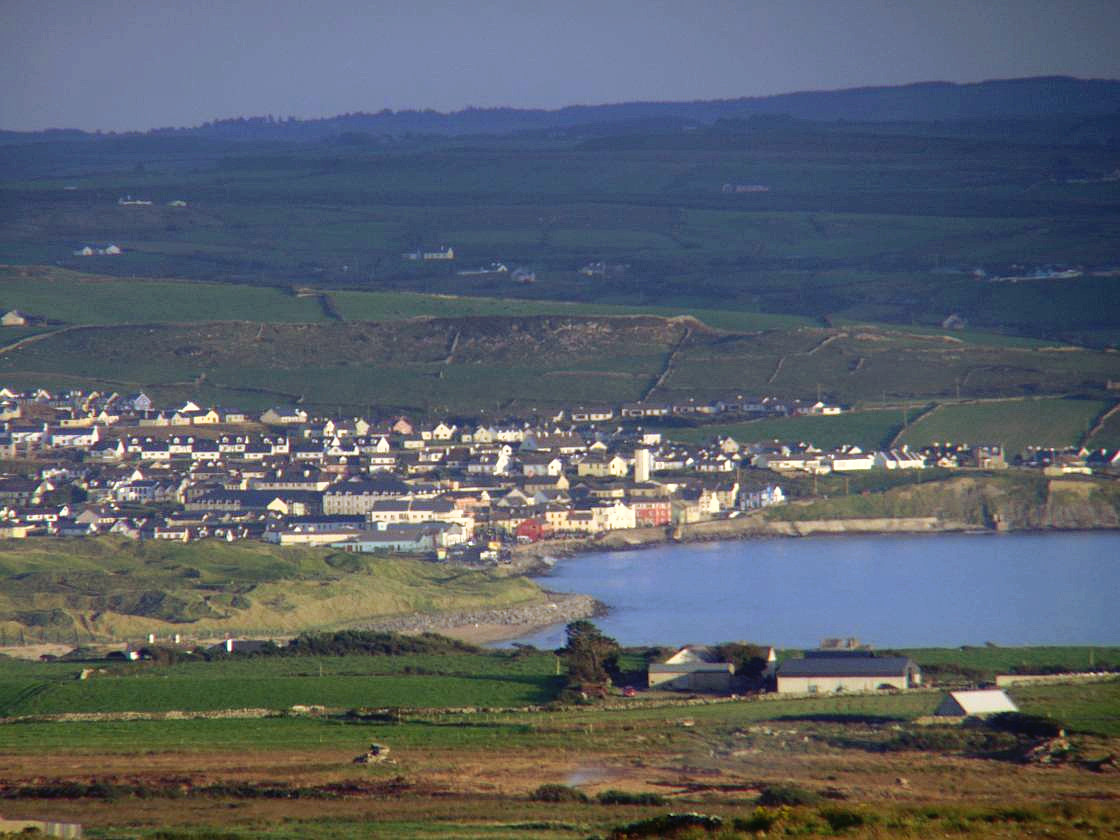

- Location in Ireland
- Coordinates: 52°56′13″N 9°20′42″W
- Country: Ireland
- Province: Munster
- County: County Clare

Population (2022)
  - Total: 1,018
- Irish Grid Reference: R134877

Lahinch or Lehinch (Irish: An Leacht or Irish: Leacht Uí Chonchubhair, meaning 'The Memorial cairn of O'Connor') is a small town on Liscannor Bay, on the northwest coast of County Clare, Ireland. It lies on the N67 national secondary road, between Milltown Malbay and Ennistymon, roughly 75 kilometres (47 mi) by road southwest of Galway and 68 kilometres (42 mi) northwest of Limerick. The town is a seaside resort and is home to the Lahinch Golf Club. It has become a popular surfing location.

== Etymology ==
Lahinch is the anglicised form of Leath Inse, meaning half island or peninsula. This is not related to Leacht Uí Chonchubhair, which means "O'Connor's Grave", referring to the memorial cairn (Leacht) marking the burial place of one of the O’Connor chieftains, who were the ruling clan of the district of Corco Modhruadh Iartharach.

The town was recorded by the Annals of the Four Masters as Leith Innse, which is a variant of the Irish word for a peninsula leithinis ("half island"), which describes the village's location between the Inagh River and the sea. The town today is mostly spelled "Lahinch", but some road signs in the area use the spelling "Lehinch".

== History and landmarks ==
Dough Castle tower ruins

Several earth forts in the area indicate that the area was inhabited in ancient times, the most prominent of which is on the northern side of the hill above the village along the road to Ennistymon. The fort is believed to have been built by the Danish Vikings and lies on a hill which later became known as "Doctor's Hill" after a doctor was murdered there. In 2020, an ancient monument, believed to be a cliff ring fort created thousands of years ago, was discovered near the coastal area of Lahinch.

In the Middle Ages, the O'Brien clan dominated the coastline; Liscannor Castle and Dough Castle are now ruins. The tower of Dough Castle stands on the golf course, and O'Brien's Bridge across the Inagh River is in the vicinity. As late as the 18th century, Lahinch was still a small hamlet with only a few fishermen's huts. It grew in the 19th century to over 1000 people by 1835, but it was not until later in the century that the infrastructure of the town developed and it became a seaside resort following the opening of the West Clare Railway in 1887. In 1883, the town was struck by a severe storm which destroyed the sea wall and promenade and damaged many buildings. Local governor William Edward Ellis overlooked the repair work which followed and the construction of a new sea wall and promenade were inaugurated by the wife of the Viceroy, Lady Aberdeen, in July 1893.

A book "Holiday Haunts of the West Coast of Clare" (1891) stated that Lahinch's "strand for length, width and evenness is not to be excelled in Ireland", noting that the "accommodation is excellent, neat and respectable". The following year, the establishment of Lahinch Golf Club further contributed to the growth of the town. In 1900, Gertrude Crowe of "Times Weekly" wrote: "Lahinch, a restful picturesque spot on the west coast of Clare, retains much of its primitive old world charm. In the good times, it is celebrated for the assemblage of rank and beauty and fashion who resorted thither for bathing. An 1822 Guide mentions that the neighbouring gentry was in the habit of having warmly contested races on the strand." Historically the people of the town celebrated Garland Sunday on the last Sunday of July, attracting people from across the county. Stalls lined the main street with numerous other attractions for the visitors.

On 22 and 23 September 1920, British RIC troops avenged the Rineen Ambush, in which they lost six men, by scorching some 26 buildings, including Lahinch Town Hall and the local dance club on the Promenade. Aideen Carrol describes the RIC as running "amok in Lahinch and Miltown Malbay in an orgy of burning and beating". Dan Lehane's house at Cragg near Lahinch was raided and he was interrogated at gunpoint, but to no avail.

The West Clare Railway closed in 1961, but the town has retained its popularity and in recent times has become a renowned surfing location. Today the town contains several small cafes and restaurants, a church, a pub, the Lahinch and Shamrock Hotels, a bookstore and a surfing school. Just outside the town is Moy House, a country house set in 15 acres of woodland on the River Moy, voted Country House of the Year by Georgina Campbell's Ireland in 2003. In the summer of 1996, Lahinch Seaworld and Leisure Centre with an aquarium, a 25 m indoor swimming pool, children's pool, sauna, Jacuzzi, and other facilities opened. In 2002 G. A. Finn published Lazy Days at Lahinch, a light-hearted collection of short stories about local golfers. A scene from the TV series Father Ted was shot on Lahinch beach. This scene was included in the "A Christmassy Ted" episode, released on DVD, in October 2009. Due to its coastal location, Lahinch often bears the brunt of Winter storms. In January, 2014, a major storm occurred, which produced massive spectacular waves, which crashed against the main Promenade. Pictures of the massive waves, received widespread media coverage.

=== Lahinch Church ===
The current Catholic church replaced an older church, at the same location, which was built in 1831. This church was demolished in 1947, due to its dilapidated condition. The new church, which was designed by Corr and McCormick architects, had a capacity for 450 parishioners. This was the same firm, which had designed the nearby Ennistymon Catholic church. The new church was significantly larger than the old church, which held just 250 parishioners. Creation of the new larger church proved a challenge for the architects, as the old site was small, had adjacent houses, and backed up to steep hill. This resulted in an adjacent house being demolished, and a retaining wall being constructed at the rear of the site. The new church was opened in 1954, by the then Bishop of Galway, Michael Browne, at a cost of 38,000 Irish pounds. The church is in the Modernist style, yet has an Italianate feel, being gable-fronted to the north, with its dominant square belfry. The roof has a low pitch, due to storms from the sea in winter. The sanctuary floor was made from imported Italian marble. Major alterations were carried out in 1991, when side alters were removed, and the sanctuary was remodeled, at a total cost of 45,000 Irish Pounds. In 1995, a three-light window depicting The Annunciation, The Nativity, and The Presentation was added. In addition, a circular stained-glass window, showing the Virgin as the Mother of the Seasons, was also added over the entrance.

== Sport ==
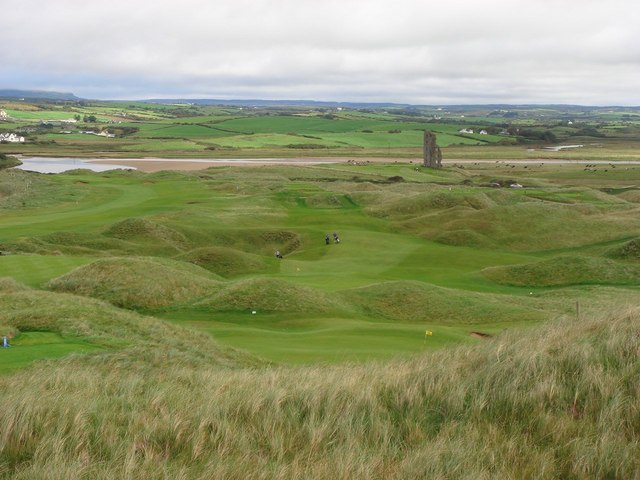
Lahinch Golf Club

Lahinch is home to the 36-hole Lahinch Golf Club, founded in 1892. The original links was laid out by Old Tom Morris. Alister MacKenzie, who co-designed Augusta National Golf Club, redesigned and extended the links in 1927 for a fee of £2,000. Lahinch Golf Club is home to the South of Ireland Championship, an amateur golf tournament which began in 1895. It was also host to the Dubai Duty Free Irish Open, in July 2019.

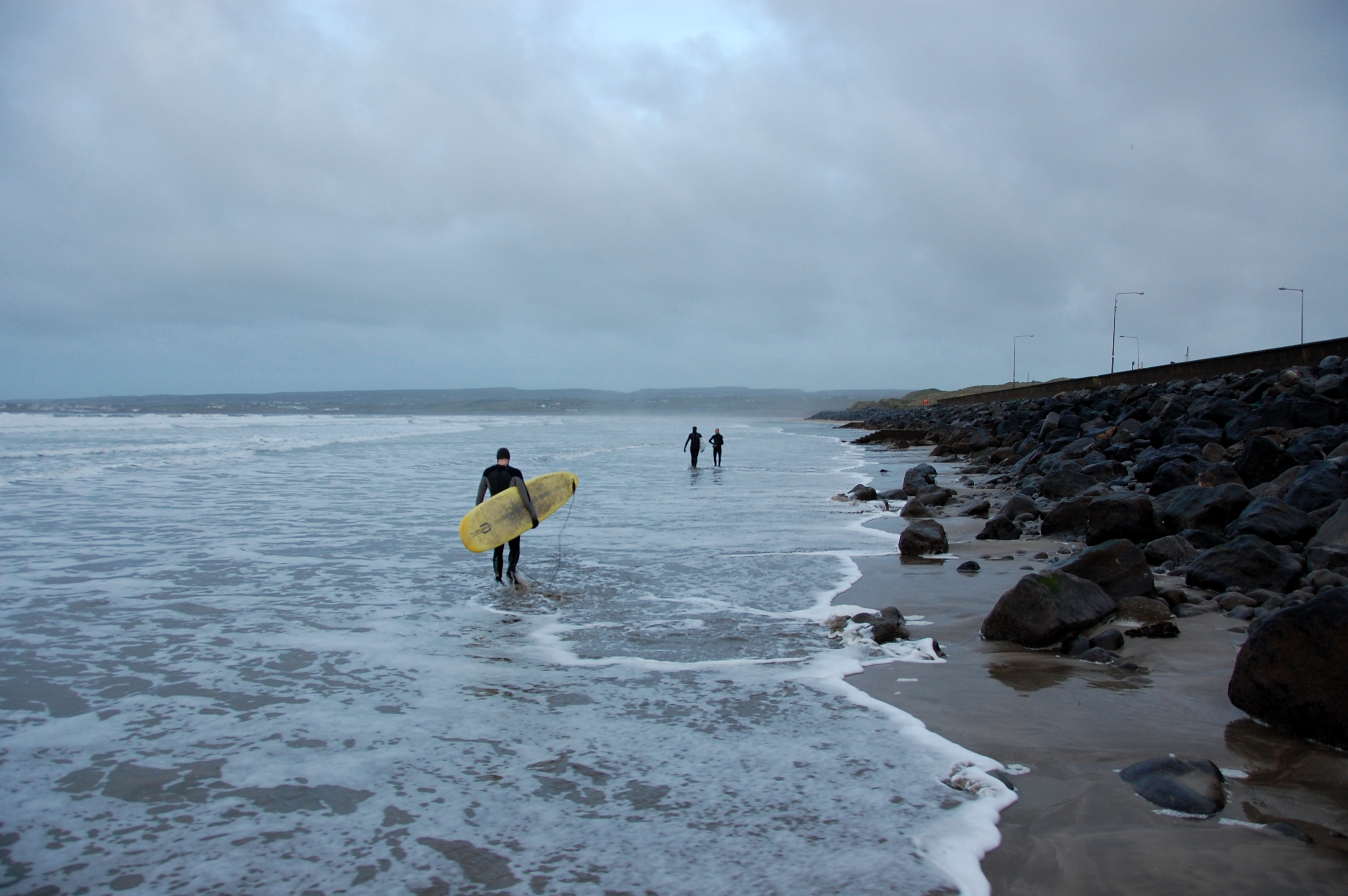
Surfers getting ready to catch some waves at Lahinch.

Lahinch has become one of the foremost surfing locations in Ireland, and is home to a surfing school. On 14 May 2006, 44 surfers managed to ride one small wave, setting a new world record. Lahinch is also a location for other watersports including kitesurfing and windsurfing. Lahinch Sea Rescue, an independent lifeboat service, provides protection for water-users.

Moher Celtic and Sporting Ennistymon are the local soccer clubs. The clubs have underage teams from U8s up to U16s who play in the Clare Schoolboy/Girls Soccer League. The Youths and Junior A and B teams play in the Clare District Soccer League. The A team play in the Premier Division in the Clare District Soccer League and the B team play in the Third Division. The underage teams and only one of the Junior teams play their home fixtures in Lahinch Sportsfield. Mohers Celtics B team plays their fixtures at Liscannor Sportsfield while Sporting Ennistymon B team plays at Mullagh Sportsfield.

Ennistymon GAA is the local GAA club which offers gaelic football and hurling teams from u6 to adult level. Ennistymon are a senior football club and currently have 3 adult teams. Ennistymon are a Junior A hurling club and currently have two adult teams.

Other activities in the area include fishing, cycling, hiking, and pony trekking.

== Transport ==
=== Bus ===
Bus Éireann route 350 links Lahinch to several locations: Ennis, Ennistymon, Cliffs of Moher, Doolin, Lisdoonvarna and Galway. There are a number of journeys each way daily. Onward rail and bus connections are available at Ennis and Galway. Lahinch is also linked to Doonbeg, Spanish Point, Miltown Malbay, Kilfenora, Corofin and Ennis by Route 333, with services running Monday to Saturday once daily.

=== Rail ===
Lahinch was formerly served by the narrow gauge West Clare Railway, which linked Kilrush, Kilkee and Milltown Malbay with Ennis. The railway station opened on 2 July 1887; the entire line (including Lahinch station) closed on 1 February 1961. Nowadays Ennis railway station is the nearest and Bus Éireann route 350 stops outside it.

== Notable people ==
- Alphonsus Cullinan (born 1959), Roman Catholic prelate, current Bishop of Waterford and Lismore
- Cathal Malone (born 1992), Clare Senior Hurler, All Ireland Senior Hurling Winner 2024
- Kitty Hayes (1928–2008), concertina player, born in Fahanlunaghta
- Robert Dermot O'Flanagan (1901–1972), Roman Catholic prelate, Bishop of Juneau between 1951 and 1968
- Paddy Skerritt (1927–2001), professional golfer

== Gallery ==
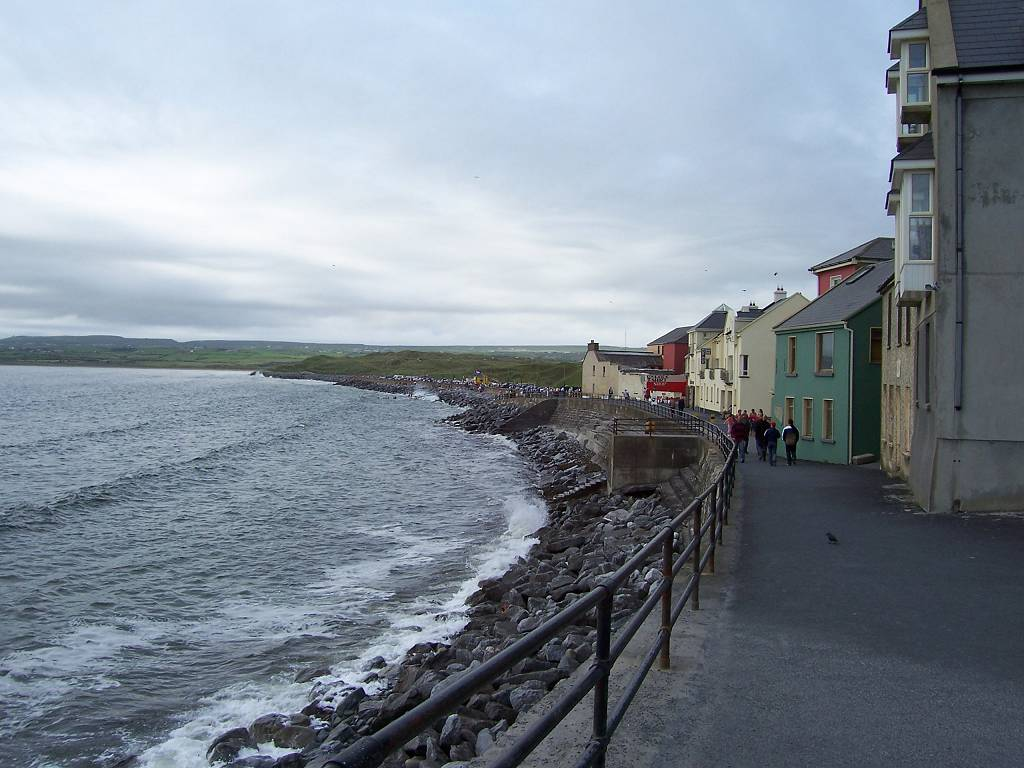
The waterfront in August 2005

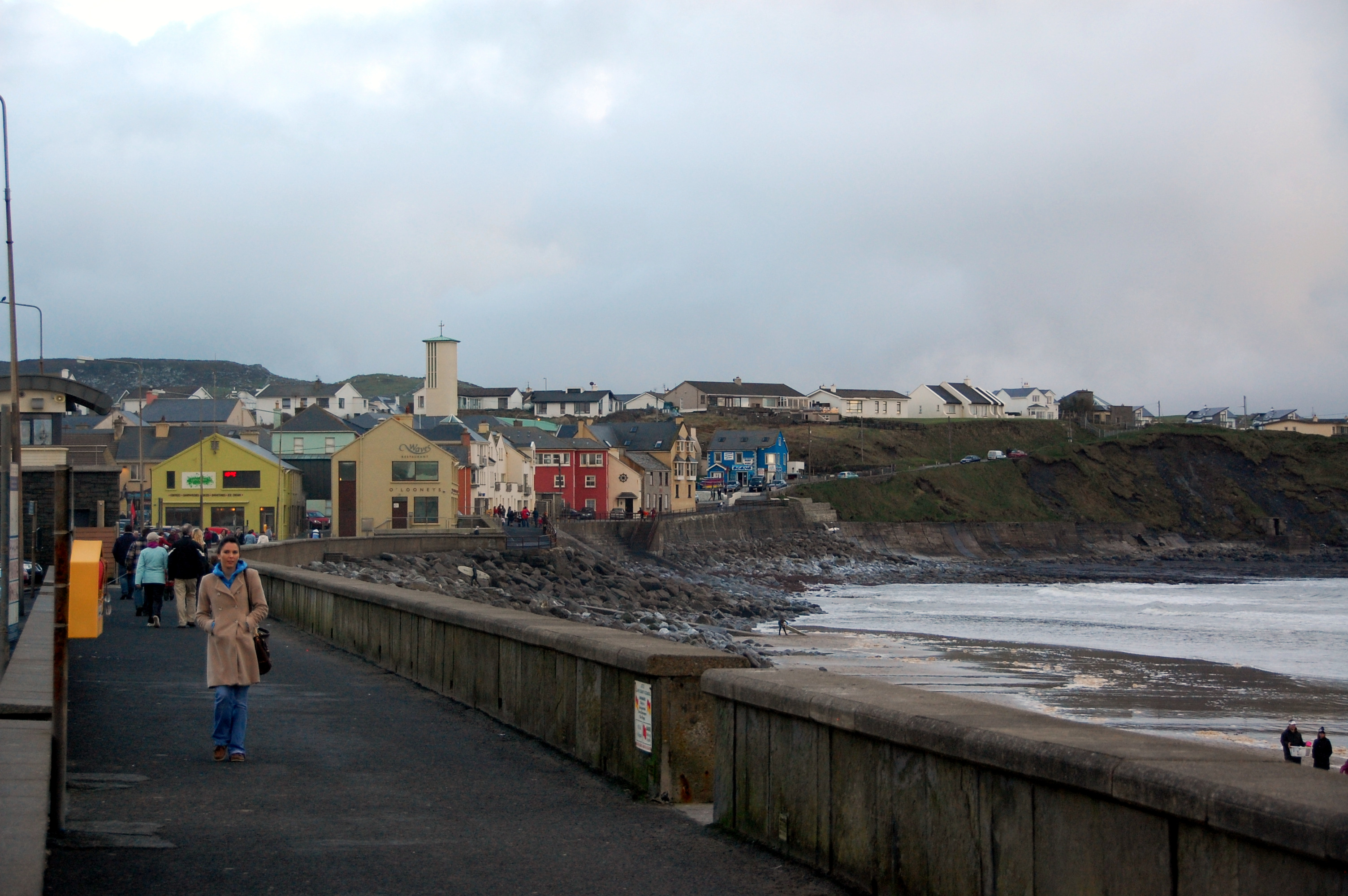
Lahinch promenade in February 2012

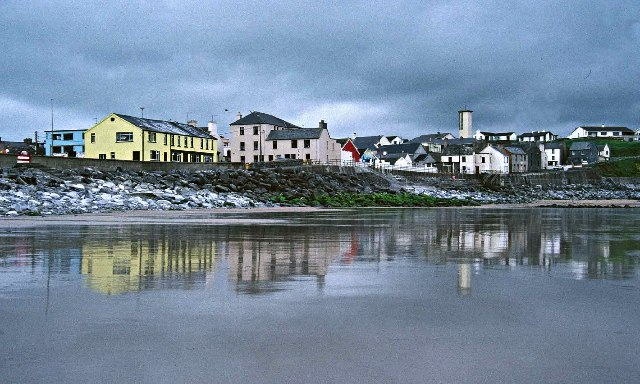
View of the town from the beach

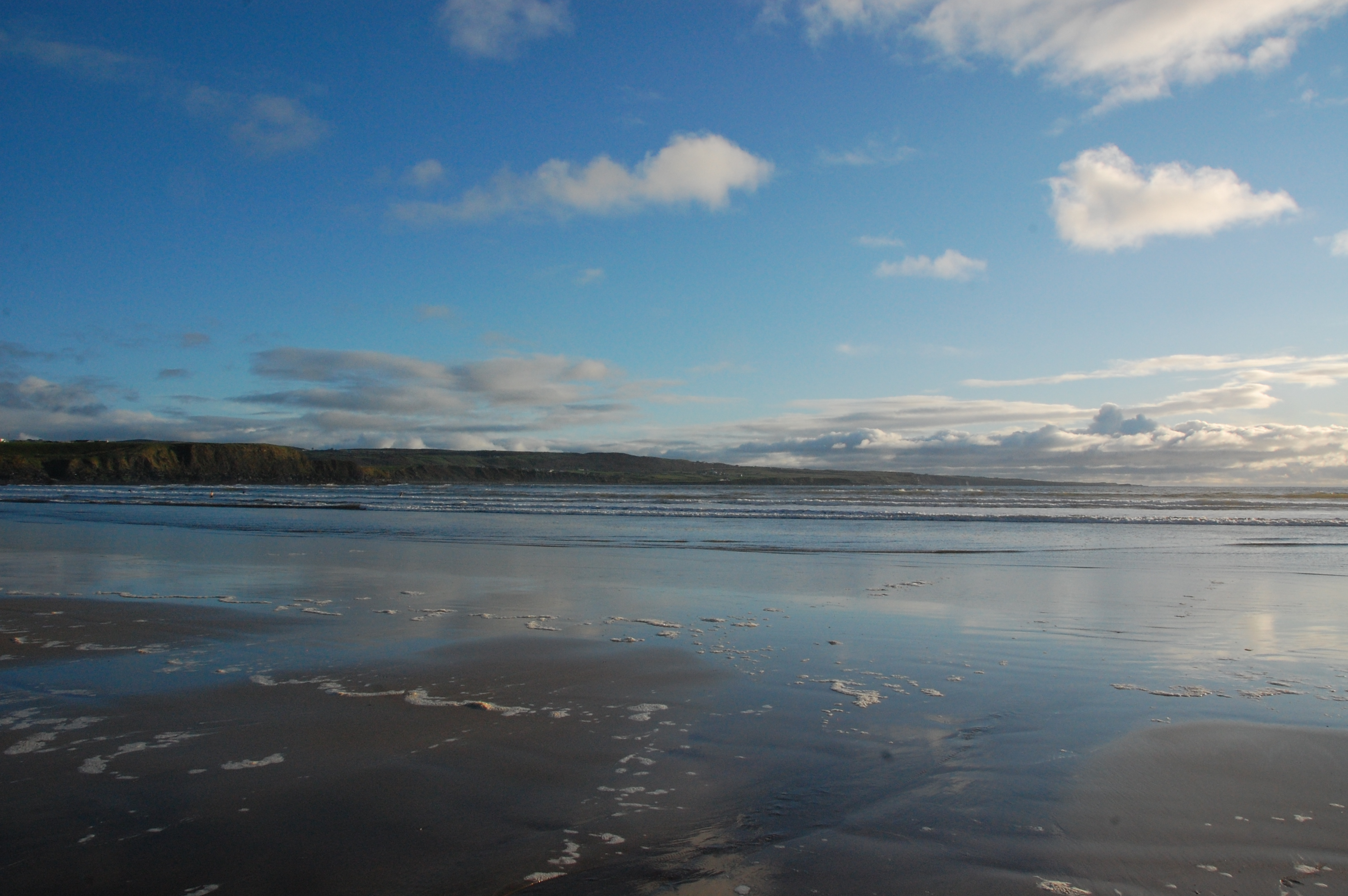
Looking out to sea at Lahinch beach

== See also ==
- List of towns and villages in the Republic of Ireland
- I Was Happy Here, movie filmed in Lahinch
- Smother, TV series filmed in and around Lahinch
