= Lahinch Golf Club =

Golf course in County Clare, Ireland

- Location in Ireland
- 52.936°N 9.346°W

Club information
- Location: Lahinch, County Clare, Munster, Ireland
- Established: 1892, 134 years ago
- Type: links
- Total holes: 36
- Tournaments: South of Ireland Championship (annual); Jacques Léglise Trophy (2003); Irish Open (2019); Arnold Palmer Cup (2024); Walker Cup (2026)
- Website: lahinchgolf.com

Old Course (Championship)
- Designed by: Old Tom Morris (1892); Alister MacKenzie (1927); Martin Hawtree (2003)
- Par: 72
- Length: 6,950 yards (6,355 m)
- Course record: 60 – Robert Rock (2019)

Castle Course
- Designed by: John D. Harris
- Par: 69
- Length: 5,488 yards (5,018 m)

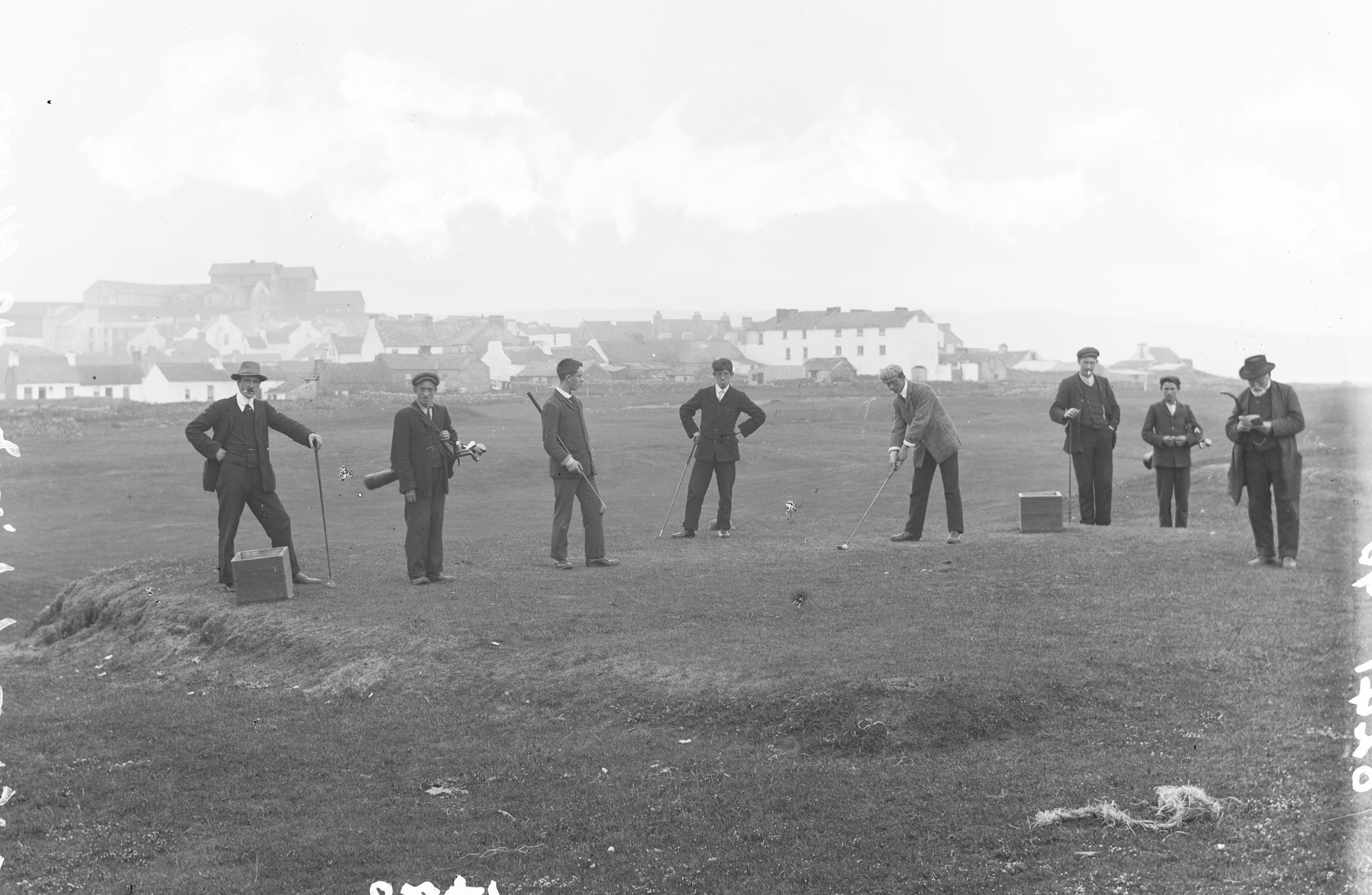
Golf at Lahinch, c. 1897

Lahinch Golf Club is a links golf course in western Ireland, in the town of Lahinch on the northwest coast of County Clare in northern Munster. It is situated approximately thirty-two kilometres (20 mi) northwest of the town of Ennis. In 2024, Golf Digest ranked the Old Course at Lahinch #27 on their list of the world's greatest golf courses.

== History ==
Lahinch Golf Club was founded 134 years ago in 1892 by Alexander W. Shaw and Richard J. Plummer, officials of Limerick Golf Club. They laid out an 18-hole course, the original course had ten holes on each side of the road. It has been described as the "St. Andrews" of Ireland.

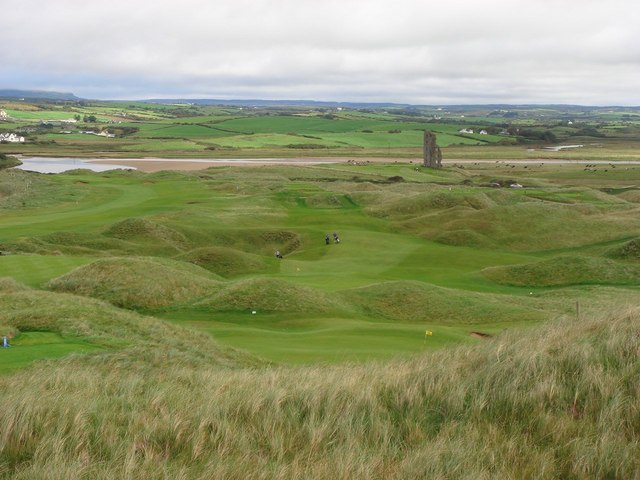
Lahinch Golf Club

The original links was laid out by Old Tom Morris; Alister MacKenzie, who co-designed Augusta National Golf Club, redesigned the Old Course and extended the links in 1927 for a fee of £2000. Lahinch is actually two 18-hole courses, the Old Course, is between the road and the sea, situated at the opposite side of the road from the Old Course is the Castle Course. The Castle Course is a flatter links named after the ruins of a nearby castle tower that stands to the north of the course.

The Old Course at Lahinch was renovated by Martin Hawtree from 1999 to 2003, during which four holes were re-routed. Two new par-3s were also added along with 16 new tees and various bunkers.

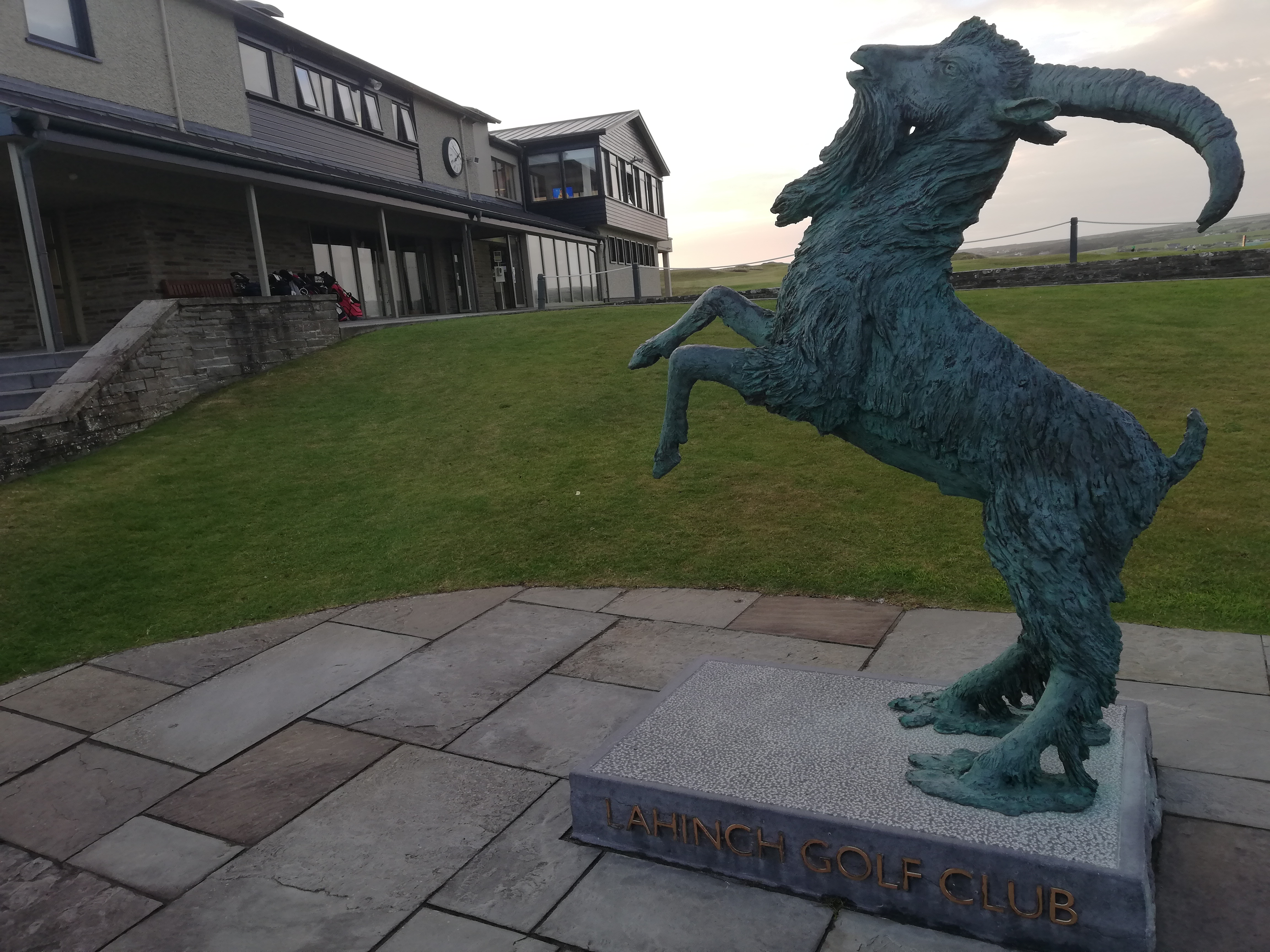
Sculpture of a feral goat at Lahinch GC

One unusual feature of the Old Course is the presence of goats which are allowed to roam freely across the course. They were originally owned by a caddie who lived near the course, and in 1956 a goat was incorporated into the club's logo. As part of the club's celebrations for its 125th anniversary, a bronze statue of the "Rampant Goat" was installed outside the clubhouse in June 2017. It was created by sculptor Seamus Connolly.

Green fees generated €4.2 million in revenue for Lahinch Golf Club in 2025, which was 65% of the club's total revenue that year. The green fee was €450 in 2026 and set to rise to €500 in 2027. Annual membership was €950 and the club had 2,500 members as of 2026. Club captain John Gleeson said to The Irish Times that new membership was mostly limited to family of existing members and this made it "nigh on impossible" for outsiders to join.

== Events hosted ==
Lahinch Golf Club is home to the South of Ireland Championship, an amateur golf tournament which began in 1895. Notable winners include Joe Carr in 1969, Darren Clarke in 1989, Paul McGinley in 1991 and Graeme McDowell in 2000. Ireland's Pádraig Harrington finished runner up on two occasions.

As part of the 2019 European Tour schedule, Lahinch Golf Club hosted the Dubai Duty Free Irish Open in July. The tournament was hosted by Paul McGinley and won by Jon Rahm. During the tournament, Robert Rock broke the course record with a 60 in the third round. He had an eagle putt on the par-5 18th to shoot 59, but narrowly missed.

Lahinch also hosted the Arnold Palmer Cup in 2024, and is scheduled to host the 2026 Walker Cup.
