= Ennistymon =

Town in County Clare, Ireland

Ennistymon Inis Díomáin
- Town
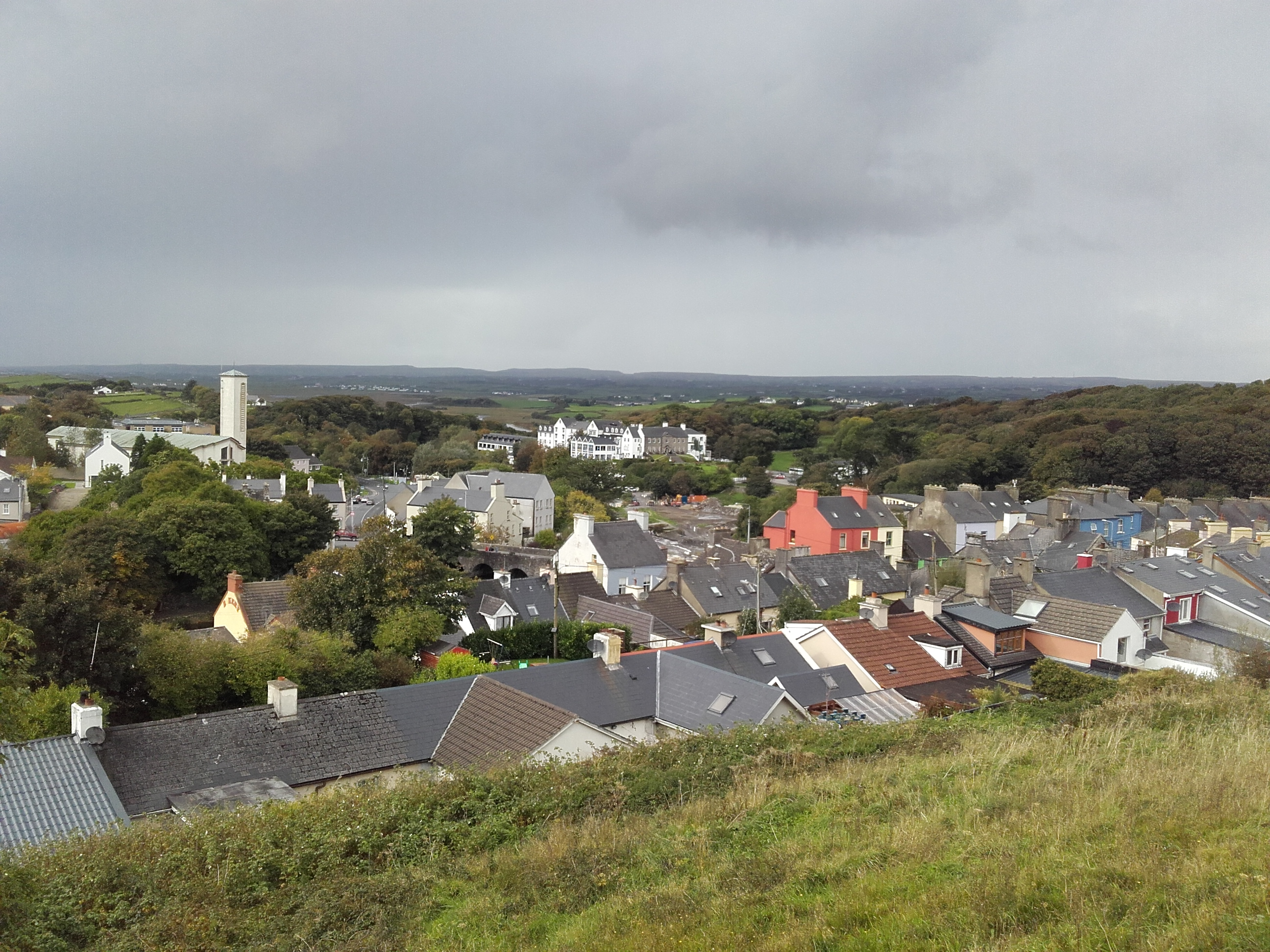

- Location in Ireland
- Coordinates: 52°56′N 9°17′W
- Country: Ireland
- Province: Munster
- County: County Clare

Population (2022)
  - Total: 1,137
- Time zone: UTC+0 (WET)
  - Summer (DST): UTC+1 (IST (WEST))
- Irish Grid Reference: R134877

Ennistymon or Ennistimon (Irish: Inis Díomáin) is a small market town in County Clare, near the west coast of Ireland. The River Inagh, with its small rapids known as the Cascades, runs through the town, behind the main street. A bridge across the river leads to nearby Lahinch. The town is at the junction of the N67 and N85 roads.

== Name ==
The town's official name is Ennistimon, although Ennistymon is the spelling most widely used. Historically, it was spelt Inishdymon. This is believed to derive from Inis Diomáin meaning "Diomán's island". However, Míchéal Ó Raghallaigh argues that the name is derived from Inis Tí Méan meaning "island of the middle house" or "river meadow of the middle house".

== Geography ==
Ennistymon is located on the border of the upland area of County Clare known as the Burren. The Cullenagh River is called Inagh after the Ennistymon cascades, at which point it becomes tidal.

== History ==
Ennistymon grew from just three cabins in 1775 to 120 houses in 1810 (70 of which were slated). The oldest part of town is the narrow street near the bridge. A Christian Brothers Monastery, Mount St. Joseph's, was established in 1824.

In autumn 1920, during the Irish War of Independence, the town was one of two burnt down by the Black and Tans in reprisal for deaths of police and soldiers in an attack by the Mid Clare brigade of the IRA at Rineen close to Milltown Malbay.

== Economy ==
Shops in Ennistymon include a SuperValu supermarket, an Aldi supermarket, two bookshops, several art galleries, several pharmacies, two fuel service stations, two phone/computer repair shops, a bakery, several hairdressers, a butcher, a veterinary clinic, a hardware shop, a print shop, dry cleaners/launderette, builders' suppliers, several cafés and restaurants. In addition to The Falls Hotel, and a number of B&Bs, there are also several pubs which host Irish traditional musicians.

== Transport ==
=== Bus ===
Two Bus Éireann routes, 333 and 350, serve the town. Route 350 links Ennistymon to Ennis, Lahinch, Cliffs of Moher, Doolin (where it is possible to connect with a ferry to the Aran Islands), Lisdoonvarna and Galway. There are a number of journeys each way daily. Onward rail and bus connections are available at Ennis and Galway. Route 333 links the town to Kilfenora, Corofin, Milltown Malbay and Doonbeg. There are also Local Link routes 331/C23 and C5 serving some local places.

=== Rail ===
The West Clare Railway formerly passed through the town, connecting it to Ennis and the West Clare coastal towns and villages. Ennistymon railway station opened on 2 July 1887. The railway closed on 1 February 1961. The closest station today is Ennis.

=== Roads ===
The principal thoroughfare through Ennistymon is New Road (part of the N85) and Main Street (part of the N67). The N67 runs from Galway city to Tarbert, County Kerry, and the N85 runs to Ennis.

== Features ==
=== Notable places ===
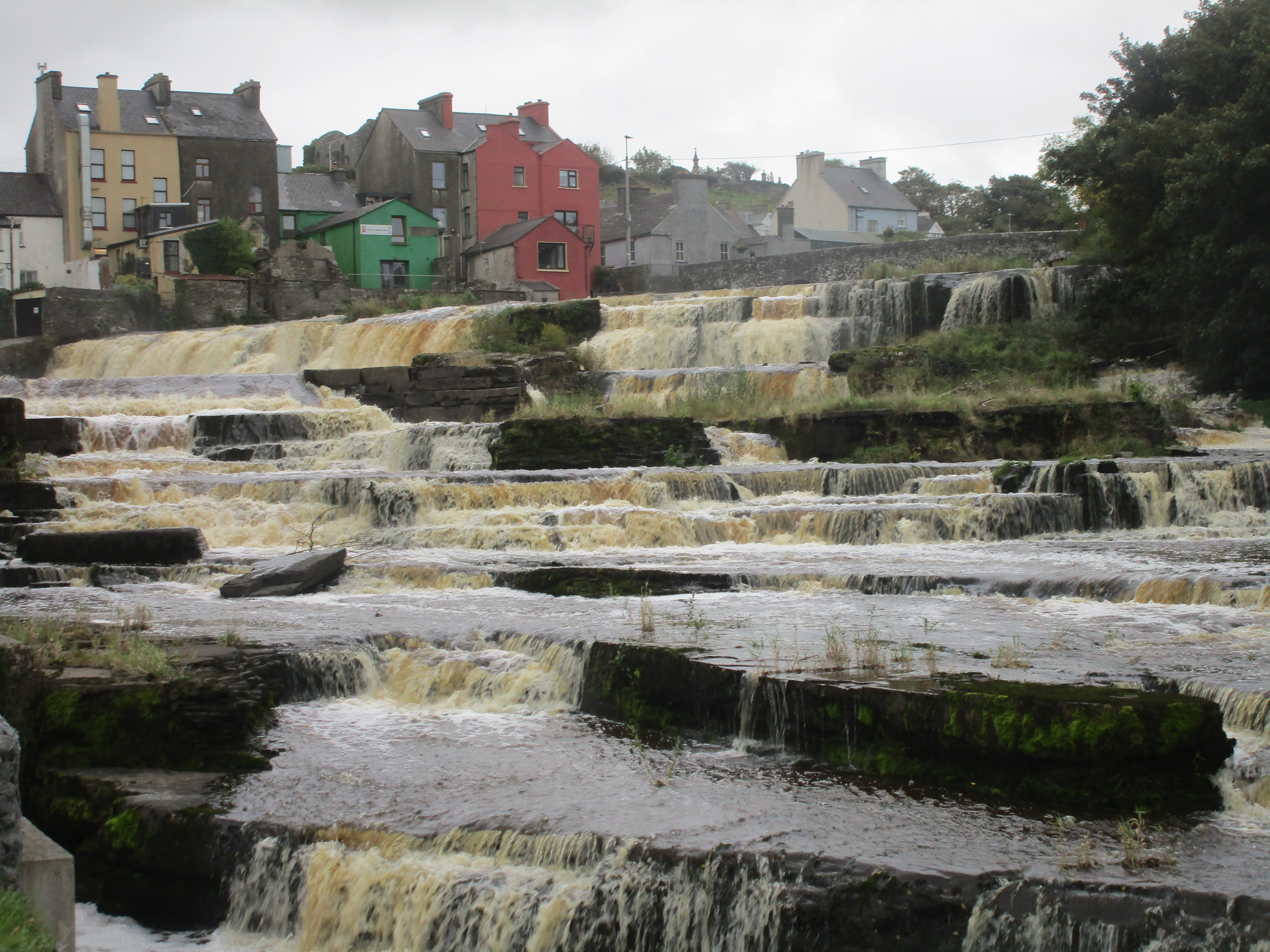
Ennistymon, The Falls

Teach Ceoil Saint Andrews is a Gothic revival Church of Ireland from the 1830s which was converted to a hall and cultural centre in 1989.

The Falls Hotel, formerly Ennistymon House, is a Georgian house built on the site of an earlier castle. It takes its name from the nearby waterfalls (falls or cascades).

The ruins of Glen Castle are located near the road to Ennis. Also in ruins is the nearby Protestant church and graveyard, built by the Archdeacon of Kilfenora James Kenny (appointed in 1775). This nave-and-chancel church was built in 1778 and fell into disuse after the new Church of Ireland was constructed in the 1830s. It features a single Gothic door, three windows on the north and one on the east side.

=== Memorial ===
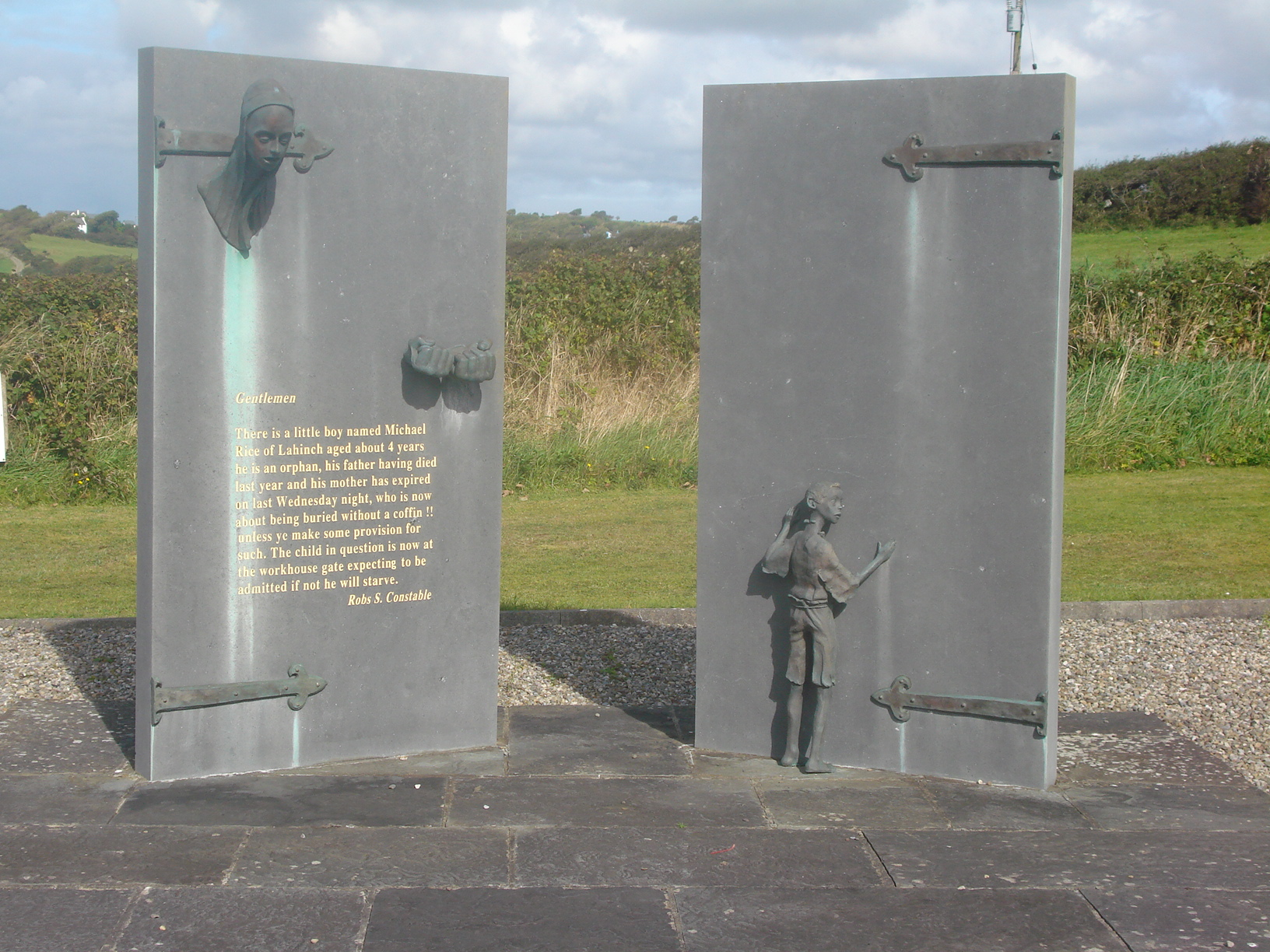
The Monument "An Gorta Mor"

The Memorial An Gorta Mór ("The Great Hunger") was erected a mile outside Ennistymon on the road to Lahinch to commemorate the memory of the victims of the Great Famine from 1845 to 1850. It was dedicated on 20 August 1995 – the 150th anniversary of the Famine. Located across from Palladian Ennistymon Hospital, itself built on the grounds of the local workhouse (Union of Kilmanaheen), it was erected by a combined effort of the Ancient Order of Hibernians (AOH), Board of Erin, Board of America and Clare County Council.

The monument was designed by an artist from County Kerry and depicts an account found in the Minutes of the Meetings of the Boards of Guardians for Ennistymon Union held in the County Archives. The account centred on a note that was pinned to the torn shirt of a barefoot orphan boy who was left at the workhouse door on the freezing cold morning of 25 February 1848. The note read:

Gentlemen,

There is a little boy named Michael Rice of Lahinch aged about 4 years. He is an orphan, his father having died last year and his mother has expired on last Wednesday night, who is now about to be buried without a coffin!! Unless ye make some provision for such. The child in question is now at the Workhouse Gate expecting to be admitted, if not it will starve. -- Rob S. Constable''

One side of the memorial depicts a child standing before the workhouse door, while across from that is the head of an anguished mother and two hands clenched in frustration or anger above the sorrowful text of the pleading note.

== Education ==
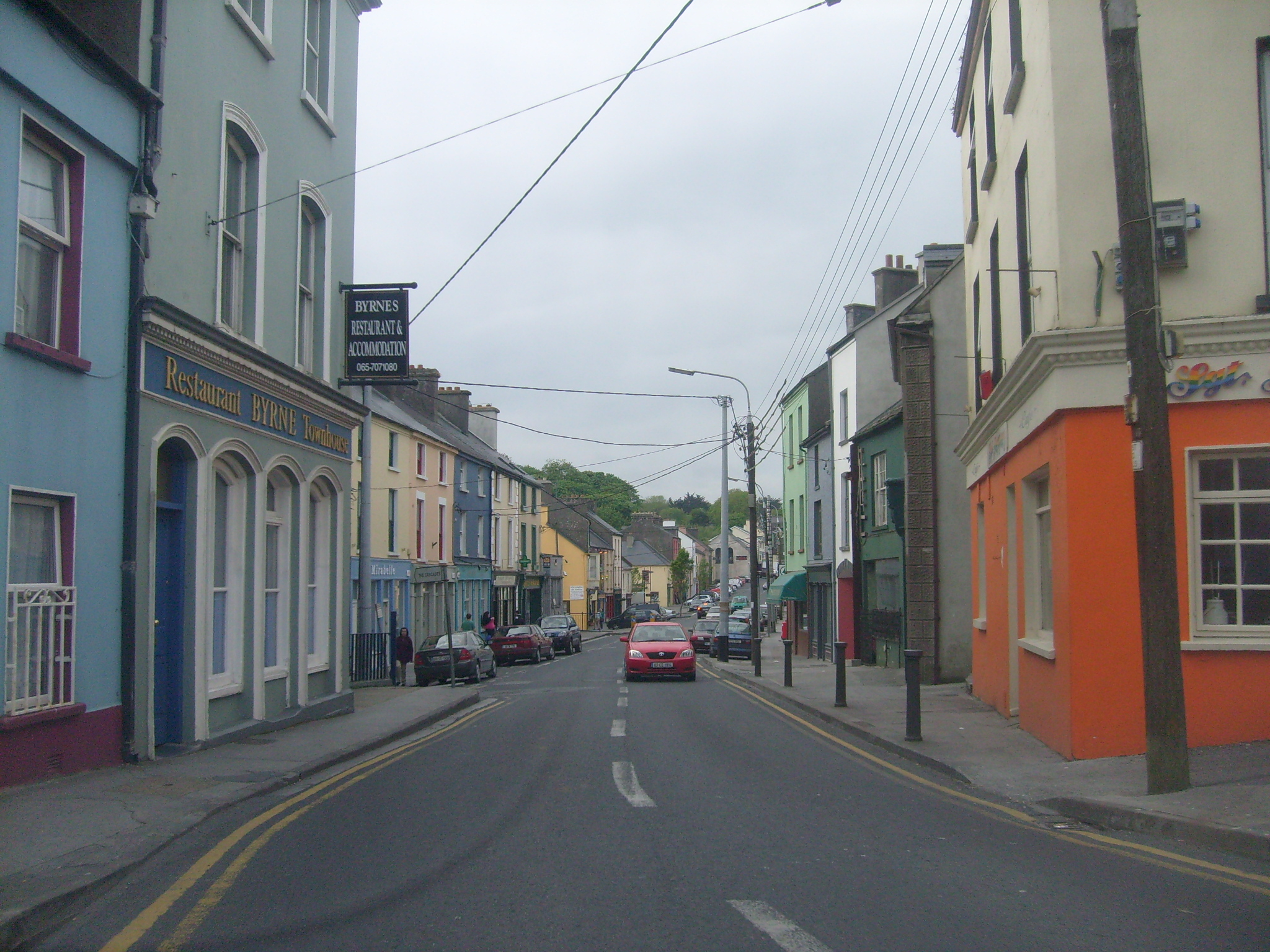
A view of Ennistymon.

Ennistymon has two primary schools: Scoil Mhainchin/Ennistymon National School and what began as Mol an Oige Steiner School. Mol an Oige National School became the first Steiner method school in Ireland to be given permanent recognition as a national school, granted in 2015 by the Department of Education. Patronage of Mol an Óige Steiner National School was transferred on 1 September 2019 to the Limerick and Clare Education and Training Board and it became Mol an Óige Community National School (CNS) in 2019.

Scoil Mhainchin was formed as an amalgamation of the CBS Primary School and The Convent of Mercy National School.

There are also three secondary schools in the town: Ennistymon CBS, which is the only all-boys school in the county, the Vocational School and Scoil Mhuire. Plans are in place to amalgamate these three schools.

== Notable people ==
- Kootenay Brown (by birth John George Brown), Irish-Canadian polymath, soldier, trader and conservation advocate
- Martin Conway, Irish Fine Gael politician
- Marie Davenport, Irish former female long-distance runner
- John Philip Holland, Irish engineer and inventor of the submarine; attended C.B.S. Secondary School Ennistymon
- Seamus Mac Cruitín, Irish poet and bard
- Steve Wall, Irish musician and actor
- Brian Merriman, Irish language poet and teacher (a statue of him stands outside St Andrew's church)
- William O'Brien, 2nd Marquess of Thomond, Irish peer
- William Rynne, Irish Republican who fought in the 1916 Rising

== Town twinning ==
Ennistymon is twinned with:

- Pozzoleone, Italy
- Schimatari, Greece
