= Coastal landforms of Ireland =

List of Irish costal landforms

Ireland is an island surrounded by water, with a 7,500 kilometres (4,700 mi) coastline. This list catalogues about 400 of the coastal landforms of the island including bays, estuaries, harbours, headlands, and many others. Most offshore features such as islands, stags (stacks), and rocks are omitted but are presented at List of islands of Ireland. A list of beaches is available at List of beaches in Ireland.

Some landform names appear more than once and an analysis of duplicate names follows the table.

== Landform sequence: Relative Location Index (RLI column) ==
The first view of this table shows landforms in an anti-clockwise direction around the Irish coast, starting at the northern extremity of the Inishowen Peninsula and proceeding from north, to west, to south, and to east. After the table is sorted in various ways by the viewer, the Relative Location Index (RLI) column allows it to be restored to its original order by sorting the RLI in ascending sequence. Alternatively, the landforms may be viewed in the clockwise direction (north, east, south, west) by sorting the RLI column in descending order.

== List of landforms ==
Landform	Irish Name	Type	County	Province	Country	RLI
Lough Foyle	Loch Feabhail	estuary	Donegal	Ulster	Republic of Ireland	1
Inishowen	Inis Eoghain	peninsula	Donegal	Ulster	Republic of Ireland	2
Quigley's Point	Rinn Uí Choigligh	point	Donegal	Ulster	Republic of Ireland	3
Dunagree Point	Dún na Graí	point	Donegal	Ulster	Republic of Ireland	4
Inishowen Head	Srúibh Brain	promontory	Donegal	Ulster	Republic of Ireland	5
Balbane Head	An Ball Bán	headland	Donegal	Ulster	Republic of Ireland	6
Kinnagoe Bay	Bá Chionn an Ghabha	bay	Donegal	Ulster	Republic of Ireland	7
Dunmore Head	Cionn an Dúin Mhóir	headland	Donegal	Ulster	Republic of Ireland	8
Culdaff Bay	Cuan Chúil Dubhcha	bay	Donegal	Ulster	Republic of Ireland	9
Glengad Head	Cionn Ghleann Gad	headland	Donegal	Ulster	Republic of Ireland	10
Inishtrahull Sound	Sunda Inis Trá Tholl	sound	Donegal	Ulster	Republic of Ireland	11
Malin Head	Cionn Mhálanna	headland	Donegal	Ulster	Republic of Ireland	12
White Strand Bay	Bay Trá Bhán	bay	Donegal	Ulster	Republic of Ireland	13
Trawbreaga Bay	Bá Thrá Bhréige	bay	Donegal	Ulster	Republic of Ireland	14
Pollan Bay	Cuan an Pholláin	bay	Donegal	Ulster	Republic of Ireland	15
Tullagh Bay	Cuan na Tulcha	bay	Donegal	Ulster	Republic of Ireland	16
Tullagh Point	Cionn na Tulcha	point	Donegal	Ulster	Republic of Ireland	17
Dunaff Head	Cionn Dhún Damh	headland	Donegal	Ulster	Republic of Ireland	18
Lenan Head	Cionn an Líonáin	headland	Donegal	Ulster	Republic of Ireland	19
Lough Swilly	Loch Súilí	estuary	Donegal	Ulster	Republic of Ireland	20
Fanad Head	Cionn Fhanaide	peninsula	Donegal	Ulster	Republic of Ireland	21
Dunree Head	Cionn an Dúin Riabhaigh	headland	Donegal	Ulster	Republic of Ireland	22
Whale Head	Ceann an Mhíl Mhóir	headland	Donegal	Ulster	Republic of Ireland	23
Rinmore Point	Pointe na Rinne Móire	point	Donegal	Ulster	Republic of Ireland	24
Mulroy Bay	An Mhaoil Rua	estuary	Donegal	Ulster	Republic of Ireland	25
Broad Water	An t-Inbhear Leathan	estuary	Donegal	Ulster	Republic of Ireland	26
Rosguill	Ros Goill	peninsula	Donegal	Ulster	Republic of Ireland	27
Melmore Head	An Meall Mór	headland	Donegal	Ulster	Republic of Ireland	28
Rinnafaghla Point	Pointe Rinn na Fachla	point	Donegal	Ulster	Republic of Ireland	29
Downings	Dún Ing	harbour	Donegal	Ulster	Republic of Ireland	30
Tranarossan Bay	Trá na Rosann	bay	Donegal	Ulster	Republic of Ireland	31
Sheephaven Bay	Cuan na gCaorach	bay	Donegal	Ulster	Republic of Ireland	32
Horn Head	Corrán Binne	headland	Donegal	Ulster	Republic of Ireland	33
Tory Sound	Cainéal Thoraí	sound	Donegal	Ulster	Republic of Ireland	34
Bloody Foreland	Cnoc Fola	headland	Donegal	Ulster	Republic of Ireland	35
Gweedore Bay	Bá Ghaoth Dobhair	bay	Donegal	Ulster	Republic of Ireland	36
Inishfree Bay	Bá Inis Fraoigh	bay	Donegal	Ulster	Republic of Ireland	37
Rosses Bay	Bá na Rosann	bay	Donegal	Ulster	Republic of Ireland	38
Torneady Point	Tor an Éidigh	point	Donegal	Ulster	Republic of Ireland	39
Crohy Head	Ceann na Cruaiche	headland	Donegal	Ulster	Republic of Ireland	40
Trawenagh Bay	Trá Éanach	bay	Donegal	Ulster	Republic of Ireland	41
Dooey Point	Gob na Dumhcha	point	Donegal	Ulster	Republic of Ireland	42
Gweebarra Bay	Béal an Bheara	bay	Donegal	Ulster	Republic of Ireland	43
Dunmore Head	An Dún Mór	headland	Donegal	Ulster	Republic of Ireland	44
Dawros Head	Ceann Dhamhrois	headland	Donegal	Ulster	Republic of Ireland	45
Loughros More Bay	Gaoth Luacharois Mór	bay	Donegal	Ulster	Republic of Ireland	46
Loughros Point	Luacharos	point	Donegal	Ulster	Republic of Ireland	47
Glen Head	Ceann Ghlinne	headland	Donegal	Ulster	Republic of Ireland	48
Glen Bay	Bá Ghlinne	bay	Donegal	Ulster	Republic of Ireland	49
Rossan Point	Ceann Ros Eoghain	point	Donegal	Ulster	Republic of Ireland	50
Malin Bay	Bá Mhálanna	bay	Donegal	Ulster	Republic of Ireland	51
Trabane Sound	Sunda na Trá Báine	sound	Donegal	Ulster	Republic of Ireland	52
Carrigan Head	Ceann an Charraigín	headland	Donegal	Ulster	Republic of Ireland	53
Donegal Bay	Bá Dhún na nGall	bay	Donegal	Ulster	Republic of Ireland	54
Muckross Head	Cionn Mhucrois	peninsula	Donegal	Ulster	Republic of Ireland	55
Fintragh Bay	Fionntrá	bay	Donegal	Ulster	Republic of Ireland	56
Drumanoo Head	Droim an Umha	headland	Donegal	Ulster	Republic of Ireland	57
Carntullagh Head	Pointe Charn Tulach	headland	Donegal	Ulster	Republic of Ireland	58
Mac Swyne's Bay	Bá Mhic Suibhne	bay	Donegal	Ulster	Republic of Ireland	59
St. John's Point	Pointe Charraig an Rois	point	Donegal	Ulster	Republic of Ireland	60
Inver Bay	Bá Inbhir	bay	Donegal	Ulster	Republic of Ireland	61
Doorin Point	Ceann Dúrian	point	Donegal	Ulster	Republic of Ireland	62
Kildoney Point	Pointe Chill Domhnaigh	point	Donegal	Ulster	Republic of Ireland	63
Mullaghmore Head	An Mullach Mór	headland	Sligo	Connacht	Republic of Ireland	64
Roskeeragh Point	Ros Caorach	point	Sligo	Connacht	Republic of Ireland	65
Streedagh Point	Pointe na Srithidí	point	Sligo	Connacht	Republic of Ireland	66
Sligo Bay	Cuan Shligigh	bay	Sligo	Connacht	Republic of Ireland	67
Raghly Point	Gob Reachla	point	Sligo	Connacht	Republic of Ireland	68
Drumcliffe Bay	Bá Dhroim Chliabh	bay	Sligo	Connacht	Republic of Ireland	69
Rosses Point	An Ros	point	Sligo	Connacht	Republic of Ireland	70
Ballysadare Bay	Cuan Bhaile Easa Dara	bay	Sligo	Connacht	Republic of Ireland	71
Aughris Head	Ceann Eachrois	headland	Sligo	Connacht	Republic of Ireland	72
Carrownabina Point	Ceann Cheathrú na Binne	point	Sligo	Connacht	Republic of Ireland	73
Carrickadda Point	Pointe na Carraige Fada	point	Sligo	Connacht	Republic of Ireland	74
Lenadoon Point	Gob Léana Dúna	point	Sligo	Connacht	Republic of Ireland	75
Killala Bay	Cuan Chill Ala	bay	Sligo	Connacht	Republic of Ireland	76
Killala Bay	Cuan Chill Ala	bay	Mayo	Connacht	Republic of Ireland	77
Ross Point	Ros Mhic Páidín	point	Mayo	Connacht	Republic of Ireland	78
Rathfran Bay	Bá Ráth Bhrannaibh	bay	Mayo	Connacht	Republic of Ireland	79
Lackan Bay	Bá Leacain	bay	Mayo	Connacht	Republic of Ireland	80
Creevagh Head	An Chraobhach	headland	Mayo	Connacht	Republic of Ireland	81
Downpatrick Head	Ceann Dhún Pádraig	headland	Mayo	Connacht	Republic of Ireland	82
Bunatrahir Bay	Cuan Bhun an Trathair	harbour	Mayo	Connacht	Republic of Ireland	83
Belderg Harbour	Cuan Bhéal Deirg	harbour	Mayo	Connacht	Republic of Ireland	84
Stags of Broad Haven	Na Stácaí	stack	Mayo	Connacht	Republic of Ireland	85
Benwee Head	An Bhinn Bhuí	headland	Mayo	Connacht	Republic of Ireland	86
Broadhaven Bay	Cuan an Inbhir	bay	Mayo	Connacht	Republic of Ireland	87
Rinroe Point	Barr na Rinne	point	Mayo	Connacht	Republic of Ireland	88
Sruwaddacon Bay	Sruth Fada Con	bay	Mayo	Connacht	Republic of Ireland	89
Mullet Peninsula	An Muirthead	peninsula	Mayo	Connacht	Republic of Ireland	90
Duveel Point	Gob Dhumha Mhíle	point	Mayo	Connacht	Republic of Ireland	91
Ooghran Point	Gob Uaich Aráin	point	Mayo	Connacht	Republic of Ireland	92
Erris Head	Ceann Iorrais	headland	Mayo	Connacht	Republic of Ireland	93
Glendorragh Point	Gob Ghleann Dorcha	point	Mayo	Connacht	Republic of Ireland	94
Doonamo Point	Gob Dhún na mBó	point	Mayo	Connacht	Republic of Ireland	95
Annagh Head	Ceann an Eanaigh	headland	Mayo	Connacht	Republic of Ireland	96
Corraun Point	Gob an Chorráin	point	Mayo	Connacht	Republic of Ireland	97
Tirraun Point	Gob Thoráin	point	Mayo	Connacht	Republic of Ireland	98
Blacksod Point	Gob an Fhóid Duibh	point	Mayo	Connacht	Republic of Ireland	99
Blacksod Bay	Cuan an Fhóid Duibh	bay	Mayo	Connacht	Republic of Ireland	100
Moyrahan Point	Gob Mhaigh Raithin	point	Mayo	Connacht	Republic of Ireland	101
Ardelly Point	Aird Oilí	point	Mayo	Connacht	Republic of Ireland	102
Elly Bay	Cuan Oilí	bay	Mayo	Connacht	Republic of Ireland	103
Ardmore Point	Gob na hAirde Móire	point	Mayo	Connacht	Republic of Ireland	104
Trawmore Bay	An Trá Mhóir	bay	Mayo	Connacht	Republic of Ireland	105
Doolough Point	Gob Dhumha Locha	point	Mayo	Connacht	Republic of Ireland	106
Tullaghan Bay	Bá Thulacháin	bay	Mayo	Connacht	Republic of Ireland	107
Corraun Peninsula	An Corrán	peninsula	Mayo	Connacht	Republic of Ireland	108
Achill Sound	Gob an Choire	sound	Mayo	Connacht	Republic of Ireland	109
Achill Island	Acaill	island	Mayo	Connacht	Republic of Ireland	110
Ridge Point	Gob an Iomaire	point	Mayo	Connacht	Republic of Ireland	111
Saddle Head	Ceann Diallaite	headland	Mayo	Connacht	Republic of Ireland	112
Achill Head	Ceann Acla	headland	Mayo	Connacht	Republic of Ireland	113
Moyteogue Head	Máiteog	headland	Mayo	Connacht	Republic of Ireland	114
Keem Strand	Trá na Coime	strand	Mayo	Connacht	Republic of Ireland	115
Dooega Head	Ceann Dumha Éige	headland	Mayo	Connacht	Republic of Ireland	116
Portnahally or Ashleam Bay	Bá an Aisléim	bay	Mayo	Connacht	Republic of Ireland	117
Clew Bay	Cuan Mó	bay	Mayo	Connacht	Republic of Ireland	118
Newport Bay	Cuan Bhaile Uí Fhiacháin	bay	Mayo	Connacht	Republic of Ireland	119
Westport Bay	Bá Chathair na Mart	bay	Mayo	Connacht	Republic of Ireland	120
Old Head	An Seancheann	headland	Mayo	Connacht	Republic of Ireland	121
Emlagh Point	Gob Imligh	point	Mayo	Connacht	Republic of Ireland	122
Barnabaun Point	Gob na Bearna Báine	point	Mayo	Connacht	Republic of Ireland	123
Tonakeera Point	Dún Caorach	point	Mayo	Connacht	Republic of Ireland	124
Killary Harbour	An Caoláire Rua	fjord	Mayo	Connacht	Republic of Ireland	125
Killary Harbour	An Caoláire Rua	fjord	Galway	Connacht	Republic of Ireland	126
Killary Bay Little	Bá an Chaoláire Rua Beag	bay	Galway	Connacht	Republic of Ireland	127
Rinvyle Point	Rinn Mhaoile	point	Galway	Connacht	Republic of Ireland	128
Ballynakill Harbour	Cuan Bhaile na Cille	harbour	Galway	Connacht	Republic of Ireland	129
Cleggan Bay	Cuan an Chloiginn	bay	Galway	Connacht	Republic of Ireland	130
Clifden Bay	Cuan an Chlocháin	bay	Galway	Connacht	Republic of Ireland	131
Errislannan Point	Gob Iorras Fhlannáin	point	Galway	Connacht	Republic of Ireland	132
Mannin Bay	Cuan Mhanainn	bay	Galway	Connacht	Republic of Ireland	133
Slyne Head	Ceann Léime	headland	Galway	Connacht	Republic of Ireland	134
Bunowen Bay	Cuan Bhun Abhann	bay	Galway	Connacht	Republic of Ireland	135
Ballyconneely Bay	Cuan Bhaile Conaola	bay	Galway	Connacht	Republic of Ireland	136
Dog's Bay	Cuan an Mhada	bay	Galway	Connacht	Republic of Ireland	137
Gorteen Bay	Port na Feadóige	bay	Galway	Connacht	Republic of Ireland	138
Bertraghboy Bay	Cuan na Beirtrí Buí	bay	Galway	Connacht	Republic of Ireland	139
Mace Head	Ceann Mhása	headland	Galway	Connacht	Republic of Ireland	140
Ardmore Point	Cora na hAirde Móire	point	Galway	Connacht	Republic of Ireland	141
Kilkieran Bay	Cuan Chill Chiaráin	bay	Galway	Connacht	Republic of Ireland	142
Camus Bay	Cuan Chamais	bay	Galway	Connacht	Republic of Ireland	143
Casheen Bay	Cuan Chaisín	bay	Galway	Connacht	Republic of Ireland	144
Golam Head	Ceann Gólaim	headland	Galway	Connacht	Republic of Ireland	145
North Sound	An Sunda ó Thuaidh	sound	Galway	Connacht	Republic of Ireland	146
Gregory's Sound	Sunda Ghríora	sound	Galway	Connacht	Republic of Ireland	147
Foul Sound	An Sunda Salach	sound	Galway	Connacht	Republic of Ireland	148
Fardurris Point	Fardoras	point	Galway	Connacht	Republic of Ireland	149
South Sound	An Sunda ó Dheas	sound	Galway	Connacht	Republic of Ireland	150
Galway Bay	Cuan na Gaillimhe	bay	Galway	Connacht	Republic of Ireland	151
Greatman's Bay	Cuan an Fhir Mhóir	bay	Galway	Connacht	Republic of Ireland	152
Loughaunwillin	Loch an Mhuilinn	bay	Galway	Connacht	Republic of Ireland	153
Cashla Bay	Cuan Chasla	bay	Galway	Connacht	Republic of Ireland	154
Roscam Point	Ros Cam	point	Galway	Connacht	Republic of Ireland	155
Oranmore Bay	Cuan Óran Mór	bay	Galway	Connacht	Republic of Ireland	156
Rinville Point	Gob Rinn Mhíl	point	Galway	Connacht	Republic of Ireland	157
Ardfry Point	Aird Fhraoigh	point	Galway	Connacht	Republic of Ireland	158
Mweeloon Bay	Cuan Mhaolúin	bay	Galway	Connacht	Republic of Ireland	159
Kilcolgan Point	Barr na hAirde	point	Galway	Connacht	Republic of Ireland	160
Shanmullen Channel	Cainéal an tSeanmhuilinn	channel	Galway	Connacht	Republic of Ireland	161
Dunbulcaun Bay	Bá Dhún Bolcáin	bay	Galway	Connacht	Republic of Ireland	162
Corraun Point	Gob an Chorráin	point	Galway	Connacht	Republic of Ireland	163
Ashilede Point	Ainsiléad	point	Galway	Connacht	Republic of Ireland	164
Rincarna Point	Rinn Carna	point	Galway	Connacht	Republic of Ireland	165
Ringeelaun Point	Rinn Ghiolláin	point	Galway	Connacht	Republic of Ireland	166
Muckinish Point	Rinn Mhuicinse	point	Galway	Connacht	Republic of Ireland	167
Belmuckinish Channel	Cainéal Bhéal Mhuicinse	channel	Galway	Connacht	Republic of Ireland	168
Kinvarra Bay	Cuan Chinn Mhara	bay	Galway	Connacht	Republic of Ireland	169
Galway Bay	Cuan na Gaillimhe	bay	Clare	Munster	Republic of Ireland	170
Ballyvaghan Bay	Bá Bhaile Uí Bheacháin	bay	Clare	Munster	Republic of Ireland	171
Black Head	Ceann Boirne	headland	Clare	Munster	Republic of Ireland	172
Cliffs of Moher	Aillte an Mhothair	cliff	Clare	Munster	Republic of Ireland	173
Hag's Head	Ceann Caillí	headland	Clare	Munster	Republic of Ireland	174
Liscannor Bay	Bá Lios Ceannúir	bay	Clare	Munster	Republic of Ireland	175
Mal Bay	Cuan Malbay	bay	Clare	Munster	Republic of Ireland	176
Spanish Point	Rinn na Spáinneach	point	Clare	Munster	Republic of Ireland	177
Caherrush Point	Pointe Chathair Rois	point	Clare	Munster	Republic of Ireland	178
Carrowmore Point	Pointe na Ceathrún Móire	point	Clare	Munster	Republic of Ireland	179
White Strand	An Trá Bhán	bay	Clare	Munster	Republic of Ireland	180
Doughmore Bay	An Dumhach Mhór	bay	Clare	Munster	Republic of Ireland	181
Ballard Bay	An Baile Ard	bay	Clare	Munster	Republic of Ireland	182
Donegal Point	Pointe Dhún na nGall	point	Clare	Munster	Republic of Ireland	183
Farrihy Bay	Bá an Fhairche	bay	Clare	Munster	Republic of Ireland	184
Moore Bay	Bá Chill Chaoi	bay	Clare	Munster	Republic of Ireland	185
Castle Point	Gob an Chaisleán	point	Clare	Munster	Republic of Ireland	186
Tullig Point	Tulaigh	point	Clare	Munster	Republic of Ireland	187
Loop Head (or Cape Lean)	Ceann Léime	headland	Clare	Munster	Republic of Ireland	188
Kilbaha Bay	Bá Chill Bheathach	bay	Clare	Munster	Republic of Ireland	189
Kilcredaun Point	Pointe Chill Choradáin	point	Clare	Munster	Republic of Ireland	190
Carrigaholt Bay	Bá Charraig an Chabhaltaigh	bay	Clare	Munster	Republic of Ireland	191
Corlis Point	Gob Chorrleasa	point	Clare	Munster	Republic of Ireland	192
Poulnasherry Bay	Poll na nOisrí	bay	Clare	Munster	Republic of Ireland	193
Money Point	Gob na Muine	point	Clare	Munster	Republic of Ireland	194
Clonderalaw Bay	Bá Chluain idir Dhá Lá	bay	Clare	Munster	Republic of Ireland	195
Shannon Estuary	Inbhear na Sionainne	estuary	Clare	Munster	Republic of Ireland	196
Shannon Estuary	Inbhear na Sionainne	estuary	Limerick	Munster	Republic of Ireland	197
Shannon Estuary	Inbhear na Sionainne	estuary	Kerry	Munster	Republic of Ireland	198
Ballylongford Bay	Bá Bhéal Átha Longfoirt	bay	Kerry	Munster	Republic of Ireland	199
Bunaclugga Bay	Bá Bhun na Cloiche	bay	Kerry	Munster	Republic of Ireland	200
Beal Point	Pointe Bhiaille	point	Kerry	Munster	Republic of Ireland	201
Leck Point	Rinn na Leice	point	Kerry	Munster	Republic of Ireland	202
Kerry Head	Ceann Chiarraí	headland	Kerry	Munster	Republic of Ireland	203
Ballyheige Bay	Bá Bhaile Uí Thaidhg	bay	Kerry	Munster	Republic of Ireland	204
Banna Strand	Trá na Beannaí	strand	Kerry	Munster	Republic of Ireland	205
Barrow Harbour	Cuan Bhearrúin	harbour	Kerry	Munster	Republic of Ireland	206
Tralee Bay	Bá Thrá Lí	bay	Kerry	Munster	Republic of Ireland	207
Dingle Peninsula	Daingean	peninsula	Kerry	Munster	Republic of Ireland	208
Maharees	Mhachaire	ayre	Kerry	Munster	Republic of Ireland	209
Rough Point	An Pointe Garbh	point	Kerry	Munster	Republic of Ireland	210
Brandon Bay	Bá Bhreandáin	bay	Kerry	Munster	Republic of Ireland	211
Brandon Point	Srón Bhroin	point	Kerry	Munster	Republic of Ireland	212
Brandon Head	Pointe an Choma Dóite	headland	Kerry	Munster	Republic of Ireland	213
Ballydavid Head	Ceann Bhaile Dháith	headland	Kerry	Munster	Republic of Ireland	214
Smerwick Harbour	Cuan Ard na Caithne	harbour	Kerry	Munster	Republic of Ireland	215
Sybil Head	Ceann Sibéal	headland	Kerry	Munster	Republic of Ireland	216
Clogher Head	Ceann Sratha	headland	Kerry	Munster	Republic of Ireland	217
Blasket Sound	Bealach an Bhlascaoid	sound	Kerry	Munster	Republic of Ireland	218
Dunmore Head	An Dún Mór	headland	Kerry	Munster	Republic of Ireland	219
Garraun Point	Pointe an Ghoba	point	Kerry	Munster	Republic of Ireland	220
Coumeenoole Bay	Tráigh an Choma	bay	Kerry	Munster	Republic of Ireland	221
Slea Head	Ceann Sléibhe	headland	Kerry	Munster	Republic of Ireland	222
Dingle Bay	Bá an Daingin	bay	Kerry	Munster	Republic of Ireland	223
Clogher Head	Ceann an Chloíchir	headland	Kerry	Munster	Republic of Ireland	224
Parkmore Point	Pointe na Páirce	point	Kerry	Munster	Republic of Ireland	225
Ventry Harbour	Cuan Fionntrá	harbour	Kerry	Munster	Republic of Ireland	226
Ballymore Point	Pointe an Dúinín	point	Kerry	Munster	Republic of Ireland	227
Paddock Point	An Paideac	point	Kerry	Munster	Republic of Ireland	228
Reenbeg Point	Pointe na Reanna	point	Kerry	Munster	Republic of Ireland	229
Dingle Harbour	Cuan an Daingin	harbour	Kerry	Munster	Republic of Ireland	230
Bull's Head	Ceann an Daimh	headland	Kerry	Munster	Republic of Ireland	231
Minard Head	Ceann na Mine Airde	headland	Kerry	Munster	Republic of Ireland	232
Castlemaine Harbour	Loch na dTrí gCaol	harbour	Kerry	Munster	Republic of Ireland	233
Iveragh	Uíbh Ráthach	peninsula	Kerry	Munster	Republic of Ireland	234
Kells Bay	Cuan na gCeall	bay	Kerry	Munster	Republic of Ireland	235
Canglass Point	An Ceann Glas	point	Kerry	Munster	Republic of Ireland	236
Doulus Head	Ceann Dualaisc	headland	Kerry	Munster	Republic of Ireland	237
Doulus Bay	Bá Dhualaisc	bay	Kerry	Munster	Republic of Ireland	238
Valencia Harbour	Cuan Bhéil Inse	harbour	Kerry	Munster	Republic of Ireland	239
Portmagee Channel	Góilín Dairbhre	channel	Kerry	Munster	Republic of Ireland	240
Bray Head	Ceann Bhreagha	headland	Kerry	Munster	Republic of Ireland	241
St. Finan's Bay	Bá Fhíonáin	bay	Kerry	Munster	Republic of Ireland	242
Bolus Head	Ceann Bhólais	headland	Kerry	Munster	Republic of Ireland	243
Ballinskelligs Bay	Bá na Scealg	bay	Kerry	Munster	Republic of Ireland	244
Hog's Head	Ceann Muice	headland	Kerry	Munster	Republic of Ireland	245
Sheehan's Point	Pointe Thomáis Uí Shíocháin	point	Kerry	Munster	Republic of Ireland	246
Lamb's Head	Ceann an Uain	headland	Kerry	Munster	Republic of Ireland	247
Kenmare River	An Ribhéar	estuary	Kerry	Munster	Republic of Ireland	248
Beara	Béarra	peninsula	Kerry	Munster	Republic of Ireland	249
Kilmakillogue Harbour	Cuan Chill Mocheallóg	harbour	Kerry	Munster	Republic of Ireland	250
Ardgroom Harbour	Dhá Dhrom	harbour	Cork	Munster	Republic of Ireland	251
Kilcatherine Point	Cill Chaitiairn	point	Cork	Munster	Republic of Ireland	252
Ballycrovane Harbour	Béal an Churraigh Bháin	harbour	Cork	Munster	Republic of Ireland	253
Coulagh Bay	Bá na Cuaillí	bay	Cork	Munster	Republic of Ireland	254
Cod's Head	Rinn Troisc	headland	Cork	Munster	Republic of Ireland	255
Ballydonegan Bay	Bá Bhaile Uí Dhonnagáin	bay	Cork	Munster	Republic of Ireland	256
Garinish Point	Garinis	point	Cork	Munster	Republic of Ireland	257
Dursey Head	Ceann Baoi	headland	Cork	Munster	Republic of Ireland	258
Crow Head	Rinn Chró	headland	Cork	Munster	Republic of Ireland	259
Black Ball Head	Dún Rua	headland	Cork	Munster	Republic of Ireland	260
Fair Head	An Ceann Bán	headland	Cork	Munster	Republic of Ireland	261
Bantry Bay	Bá Bheanntraí	bay	Cork	Munster	Republic of Ireland	262
Shot Head	Ceann na Gráine	headland	Cork	Munster	Republic of Ireland	263
Glengarriff Harbour	An Gleann Garbh	harbour	Cork	Munster	Republic of Ireland	264
League Point	Pointe na Léige	point	Cork	Munster	Republic of Ireland	265
Sheep's Head (or Muntervary)	Rinn Mhuintir Bháire	headland	Cork	Munster	Republic of Ireland	266
Dunmanus Bay	Bá Dhún Mánais	bay	Cork	Munster	Republic of Ireland	267
Three Castle Head	Ceann na dTrí Chaisleán	headland	Cork	Munster	Republic of Ireland	268
Mizen Head	Carn Uí Néid	headland	Cork	Munster	Republic of Ireland	269
Barley Cove	Bá na hEornan	harbour	Cork	Munster	Republic of Ireland	270
Brow Head	Ceann Bró	headland	Cork	Munster	Republic of Ireland	271
Streek Head	Ceann Stríce	headland	Cork	Munster	Republic of Ireland	272
Toormore Bay	An Tuar Mór	bay	Cork	Munster	Republic of Ireland	273
Roaringwater Bay	Loch Trasna	bay	Cork	Munster	Republic of Ireland	274
Ballydehob Bay	Béal an Dá Chab	bay	Cork	Munster	Republic of Ireland	275
Rincolisky Harbour	Cuan Rinn Chúil Uisce	harbour	Cork	Munster	Republic of Ireland	276
Church Strand Bay	Bá Thrá an Teampaill	bay	Cork	Munster	Republic of Ireland	277
Baltimore Harbour	Cuan Dúin na Séad	harbour	Cork	Munster	Republic of Ireland	278
Sherkin Point	Inis Earcáin	point	Cork	Munster	Republic of Ireland	279
Cape Clear	Cléire	headland	Cork	Munster	Republic of Ireland	280
Lough Hyne	Loch Oighinn	sea lough	Cork	Munster	Republic of Ireland	281
Toe Head	Ceann Tuaithe	headland	Cork	Munster	Republic of Ireland	282
Castle Haven	Gleann Bearcháin	bay	Cork	Munster	Republic of Ireland	283
Glandore Harbour	Cuan Dor	harbour	Cork	Munster	Republic of Ireland	284
Rosscarbery Bay	Ros Ó gCairbre	bay	Cork	Munster	Republic of Ireland	285
Galley Head	Ceann Dhún dTéide	headland	Cork	Munster	Republic of Ireland	286
Dunowen Head	Ceann Dún Eoghain	headland	Cork	Munster	Republic of Ireland	287
Clonakilty Bay	Bá Chloich na Coillte	bay	Cork	Munster	Republic of Ireland	288
Dunnycove Bay	Bá Dhún Uí Chothaigh	bay	Cork	Munster	Republic of Ireland	289
Dunworly Bay	Bá Dhún Urlainn	bay	Cork	Munster	Republic of Ireland	290
Dunworly Point	Pointe Dhún Urlainn	point	Cork	Munster	Republic of Ireland	291
Foilarea Bay	Bá Fhaill an Rí	bay	Cork	Munster	Republic of Ireland	292
Seven Heads	Na Seacht gCeanna	headland	Cork	Munster	Republic of Ireland	293
Courtmacsherry Bay	Bá Chúirt Mhic Shéafraidh	bay	Cork	Munster	Republic of Ireland	294
Barry's Point	Pointe Uí Bairrche	point	Cork	Munster	Republic of Ireland	295
Holeopen Bay West	Bá an Phoill Oscailte Iarthar	bay	Cork	Munster	Republic of Ireland	296
Old Head of Kinsale	An Seancheann	headland	Cork	Munster	Republic of Ireland	297
Kinsale Harbour	Cuan Chionn tSáile	harbour	Cork	Munster	Republic of Ireland	298
Flat Head	Ceann Maol	headland	Cork	Munster	Republic of Ireland	299
Robert's Head	Ceann Roibeárd	headland	Cork	Munster	Republic of Ireland	300
Ringabella Bay	Bá Rinn an Bhile	bay	Cork	Munster	Republic of Ireland	301
Cork Harbour	Cuan Chorcaí	harbour	Cork	Munster	Republic of Ireland	302
Lough Mahon	Loch Machan	sea lough	Cork	Munster	Republic of Ireland	303
Roche's Point	Rinn an Róistigh	point	Cork	Munster	Republic of Ireland	304
Power Head	Ceann Dhún an Phaoraigh	headland	Cork	Munster	Republic of Ireland	305
Ballycotton Bay	Bá Bhaile Choitín	bay	Cork	Munster	Republic of Ireland	306
Knocknadoon Head	Ceann Chnoc an Dúin	headland	Cork	Munster	Republic of Ireland	307
Youghal Bay	Cuan Eochaille	bay	Cork	Munster	Republic of Ireland	308
Youghal Bay	Cuan Eochaille	bay	Waterford	Munster	Republic of Ireland	309
Whiting Bay	Béal Abha	bay	Waterford	Munster	Republic of Ireland	310
Ram Head	Ceann an Ráma	headland	Waterford	Munster	Republic of Ireland	311
Mine Head	Mion Ard	headland	Waterford	Munster	Republic of Ireland	312
Muggort's Bay	An Mheá	bay	Waterford	Munster	Republic of Ireland	313
Helvick Head	Ceann Heilbhic	headland	Waterford	Munster	Republic of Ireland	314
Dungarvan Harbour	Cuan Dhún Garbhán	harbour	Waterford	Munster	Republic of Ireland	315
Ballynacourty Point	An Rinn Bhán	point	Waterford	Munster	Republic of Ireland	316
Clonea Bay	Cluain Aodha/Cluain Fhia	bay	Waterford	Munster	Republic of Ireland	317
Ballyvoyle Head	Ceann Bhaile Uí Bhaoill	headland	Waterford	Munster	Republic of Ireland	318
Ballydowane Bay	Cuan Bhaile Uí Dhubháin	bay	Waterford	Munster	Republic of Ireland	319
Bunmahon Bay	Bun Machan	bay	Waterford	Munster	Republic of Ireland	320
Dunbrattin Head	Ceannn Dhún mBreatan	headland	Waterford	Munster	Republic of Ireland	321
Dunbrattin Bay	Cuan Dhún na mBreatan	bay	Waterford	Munster	Republic of Ireland	322
Great Newtown Head	Ceann Mór an Bhaile Nua	headland	Waterford	Munster	Republic of Ireland	323
Tramore Bay	Cuan Trá Mhór	bay	Waterford	Munster	Republic of Ireland	324
Brownstown Head	Ceann Bhaile an Bhrúnaigh	headland	Waterford	Munster	Republic of Ireland	325
Waterford Harbour	Cuan Phort Láirge	estuary	Waterford	Munster	Republic of Ireland	326
Waterford Harbour	Cuan Phort Láirge	estuary	Wexford	Munster	Republic of Ireland	327
Hook Peninsula	Leithinis Rinn Duáin	peninsula	Wexford	Munster	Republic of Ireland	328
Hook Head	Rinn Duáin	headland	Wexford	Leinster	Republic of Ireland	329
Baginbun Head	Ceann Bhanú	headland	Wexford	Leinster	Republic of Ireland	330
Bannow Bay	Cuan Bhanú	bay	Wexford	Leinster	Republic of Ireland	331
Ballyteige Bay	Cuan Bhaile Taidhg	bay	Wexford	Leinster	Republic of Ireland	332
Forlorn Point	Rinn Chrois Fhearnóg	point	Wexford	Leinster	Republic of Ireland	333
Carnsore Point	Ceann an Chairn	point	Wexford	Leinster	Republic of Ireland	334
Greenore Point	Rinn na Binne	point	Wexford	Leinster	Republic of Ireland	335
Rosslare Harbour	Calafort Ros Láir	harbour	Wexford	Leinster	Republic of Ireland	336
Rosslare Bay	Bá Ros Láir	bay	Wexford	Leinster	Republic of Ireland	337
Rosslare Point	Rinn Ros Láir	point	Wexford	Leinster	Republic of Ireland	338
Wexford Harbour	Cuan Loch Garman	harbour	Wexford	Leinster	Republic of Ireland	339
The Raven Point	Rinn Rámhann	point	Wexford	Leinster	Republic of Ireland	340
Wexford Bay	Bá Loch Garman	bay	Wexford	Leinster	Republic of Ireland	341
Blackwater Harbour	An Abhainn Dubh	harbour	Wexford	Leinster	Republic of Ireland	342
Cahore Point	Rinn Chathóir	point	Wexford	Leinster	Republic of Ireland	343
Roney Point	Rinn Rónaí	point	Wexford	Leinster	Republic of Ireland	344
Kilmichael Point	Rinn Chill Mhíchíl	point	Wexford	Leinster	Republic of Ireland	345
Arklow Head	Ceann an Inbhir Mhóir	headland	Wicklow	Leinster	Republic of Ireland	346
Arklow Harbour	Cuan an Inbhir Mhóir	harbour	Wicklow	Leinster	Republic of Ireland	347
Mizen Head	Ard an Fhéaraigh	headland	Wicklow	Leinster	Republic of Ireland	348
Brittas Bay	Cuan an Bhriotáis	bay	Wicklow	Leinster	Republic of Ireland	349
Ardmore Point	Ard Mór	point	Wicklow	Leinster	Republic of Ireland	350
Wicklow Head	Ceann Chill Mhantáin	headland	Wicklow	Leinster	Republic of Ireland	351
Leamore Strand	Trá Liaigh Mhór	strand	Wicklow	Leinster	Republic of Ireland	352
Bray Head	Ceann Bhré	headland	Wicklow	Leinster	Republic of Ireland	353
Killiney Bay	Bá Chill Iníon Léinín	bay	Dublin	Leinster	Republic of Ireland	354
Sorrento Point	Pointe Sorrento	point	Dublin	Leinster	Republic of Ireland	355
Dalkey Sound	Sunda Dheilginse	sound	Dublin	Leinster	Republic of Ireland	356
Bullock Harbour	Cuan Bhlóic	harbour	Dublin	Leinster	Republic of Ireland	357
Scotsman's Bay	Bá an Albanaigh	bay	Dublin	Leinster	Republic of Ireland	358
Dún Laoghaire Harbour	Cuan Dún Laoghaire	harbour	Dublin	Leinster	Republic of Ireland	359
Dublin Bay	Cuan Bhaile Átha Cliath	bay	Dublin	Leinster	Republic of Ireland	360
Merrion Strand	Trá Mhuirfean	strand	Dublin	Leinster	Republic of Ireland	361
Sandymount Strand	Dumhach Thrá	strand	Dublin	Leinster	Republic of Ireland	362
Dollymount	Cnocán Doirinne	strand	Dublin	Leinster	Republic of Ireland	363
Drumleck Point	Pointe Dhroim Leice	point	Dublin	Leinster	Republic of Ireland	364
Doldrum Bay	Bá an Doldrama	bay	Dublin	Leinster	Republic of Ireland	365
Lion's Head	Ceann an Leoin	headland	Dublin	Leinster	Republic of Ireland	366
The Great Baily	An Bhaile Mhór	promontory	Dublin	Leinster	Republic of Ireland	367
Whitewater Brook	An Abhainn Bhán	bay	Dublin	Leinster	Republic of Ireland	368
Howth Head	Binn Éadair	peninsula	Dublin	Leinster	Republic of Ireland	369
Nose of Howth	Srón Bhinn Éadair	headland	Dublin	Leinster	Republic of Ireland	370
Balscadden Bay	Baile Scadán	bay	Dublin	Leinster	Republic of Ireland	371
Howth Harbour	Cuan Bhinn Éadair	harbour	Dublin	Leinster	Republic of Ireland	372
Cush Point	Pointe na Coise	point	Dublin	Leinster	Republic of Ireland	373
Portmarnock Point	Port Mearnóg	point	Dublin	Leinster	Republic of Ireland	374
Velvet Strand	An Trá Mhín	strand	Dublin	Leinster	Republic of Ireland	375
Prospect Point	Pointe na Radharc	point	Dublin	Leinster	Republic of Ireland	376
Burrow Strand	Trá an Choinicéir	strand	Dublin	Leinster	Republic of Ireland	377
Malahide Point	Mullach Íde	point	Dublin	Leinster	Republic of Ireland	378
Rogerstown Estuary	Inbhear Bhaile Roiséir	estuary	Dublin	Leinster	Republic of Ireland	379
Skerries Harbour	Na Sceirí	harbour	Dublin	Leinster	Republic of Ireland	380
Clogher Head	Ceann Chlochair	headland	Louth	Leinster	Republic of Ireland	381
Dunany Point	Rinn Dhún Áine	point	Louth	Leinster	Republic of Ireland	382
Dundalk Bay	Cuan Dhún Dealgan	estuary	Louth	Leinster	Republic of Ireland	383
Cooley Point	Pointe Chuaille	point	Louth	Leinster	Republic of Ireland	384
Ballagan Point	Gob Bhaile Uí Agáin	point	Louth	Leinster	Republic of Ireland	385
Carlingford Lough	Loch Cairlinn	estuary	Louth	Leinster	Republic of Ireland	386
Carlingford Lough	Loch Cairlinn	estuary	Down	Ulster	Northern Ireland	387
Cranfield Point	Pointe Chreamhchoille	point	Down	Ulster	Northern Ireland	388
Dundrum Bay	Cuan Dhún Droma	bay	Down	Ulster	Northern Ireland	389
St. John's Point	Rinn Theach Eoin	point	Down	Ulster	Northern Ireland	390
Lecale peninsula	Leath Cathail	peninsula	Down	Ulster	Northern Ireland	391
Killard Point	Aird na Cille	point	Down	Ulster	Northern Ireland	392
Strangford Lough	Loch Cuan	sea lough	Down	Ulster	Northern Ireland	393
Ards Peninsula	An Aird	peninsula	Down	Ulster	Northern Ireland	394
Ballyquintin Point	Pointe Bhaile Chuintín	point	Down	Ulster	Northern Ireland	395
Kearney Point	Pointe Uí Chearnaigh	point	Down	Ulster	Northern Ireland	396
Cloghy Bay	Bá Chlochaí	bay	Down	Ulster	Northern Ireland	397
Burr Point	An Bior	point	Down	Ulster	Northern Ireland	398
Ballyferis Point	Pointe Bhaile Uí Fhearghasa	point	Down	Ulster	Northern Ireland	399
Foreland Point	Pointe Chinn Tíre	point	Down	Ulster	Northern Ireland	400
Grey Point	An Pointe Liath	point	Down	Ulster	Northern Ireland	401
Helen's Bay	Cuan Héilin	bay	Down	Ulster	Northern Ireland	402
Belfast Lough	Loch Lao	estuary	Down	Ulster	Northern Ireland	403
Belfast Lough	Loch Lao	estuary	Antrim	Ulster	Northern Ireland	404
Black Head	An Rinn Dubh	headland	Antrim	Ulster	Northern Ireland	405
Island Magee	Oileán Mhic Aodha	peninsula	Antrim	Ulster	Northern Ireland	406
Larne Lough	Loch Latharna	sea lough	Antrim	Ulster	Northern Ireland	407
Drains Bay	Bá Draighin	bay	Antrim	Ulster	Northern Ireland	408
Ballygalley Head	Ceann Bhaile Geithligh	headland	Antrim	Ulster	Northern Ireland	409
Straidkilly Point	Pointe Shráid Choilleadh	point	Antrim	Ulster	Northern Ireland	410
Carnlough Bay	Bá Charnlaí	bay	Antrim	Ulster	Northern Ireland	411
Hunters Point	Pointe Uí Fhiachra	point	Antrim	Ulster	Northern Ireland	412
Garron Point	An Gearrán	point	Antrim	Ulster	Northern Ireland	413
Red Bay	Cuan an Deirg	bay	Antrim	Ulster	Northern Ireland	414
Runabay Head	Rú na Beithe	headland	Antrim	Ulster	Northern Ireland	415
Torr Head	Cionn an Toir	headland	Antrim	Ulster	Northern Ireland	416
Murlough Bay	Murlach	bay	Antrim	Ulster	Northern Ireland	417
Fair Head	An Bhinn Mhór	headland	Antrim	Ulster	Northern Ireland	418
Ballycastle Bay	Bá Bhaile an Chaistil	bay	Antrim	Ulster	Northern Ireland	419
Rathlin Sound	Caolas Reachlainne	sound	Antrim	Ulster	Northern Ireland	420
Rue Point	An Rú	point	Antrim	Ulster	Northern Ireland	421
Bull Point	Pointe an Tairbh	point	Antrim	Ulster	Northern Ireland	422
White Park Bay	Bá na Páirce	bay	Antrim	Ulster	Northern Ireland	423
Benbane Head	An Bhinn Bhán	headland	Antrim	Ulster	Northern Ireland	424
Causeway Head	Ceann Chlochán an Aifir	headland	Antrim	Ulster	Northern Ireland	425
Giant's Causeway	Clochán an Aifir	basalt columns	Antrim	Ulster	Northern Ireland	426
Ramore Head	Ceann na Rátha Móire	headland	Antrim	Ulster	Northern Ireland	427
Magilligan Strand	Trá Mhic Giollagáin	strand	Londonderry	Ulster	Northern Ireland	428
Downhill Strand	Trá Dhún Bó	strand	Londonderry	Ulster	Northern Ireland	429
Benone Beach	Trá Bhun Abhann	strand	Londonderry	Ulster	Northern Ireland	430
Magilligan Point	Aird Mhic Giollagáin	point	Londonderry	Ulster	Northern Ireland	431
Lough Foyle	Loch Feabhail	estuary	Londonderry	Ulster	Northern Ireland	432

== Duplicate table entries ==
1. Some landforms appear more than once when they are shared by more than one county (inter-county landforms): the Shannon Estuary, for example, is shared by counties Clare, Limerick, and Kerry. 2. Some different features have the same name, such as Mizen Head in Cork and Mizen Head in Wicklow. 3. Others have similar names such as Tullagh Bay in Donegal and Tullaghan Bay in Mayo.

Landform name	Counties
Duplicate type: Inter-county landform
Belfast Lough	Antrim and Down
Carlingford Lough	Down and Louth
Galway Bay	Clare and Galway
Killala Bay	Mayo and Sligo
Killary Harbour	Galway and Mayo
Lough Foyle	Donegal and Londonderry
Shannon Estuary	Clare, Kerry, and Limerick
Waterford Harbour	Waterford and Wexford
Youghal Bay	Cork and Waterford
Duplicate type: same name
Ardmore Point (3)	Galway, Mayo, and Wicklow
Black Head (2)	Antrim and Clare
Bray Head (2)	Kerry and Wicklow
Clogher Head (3)	Kerry (twice) and Louth
Corraun Point (2)	Galway and Mayo
Dunmore Head (3)	Donegal (Gweebarra; Inishowen) and Kerry
Fair Head (2)	Antrim and Cork
Mizen Head (2)	Cork and Wicklow
Duplicate type: similar name
Rinville Point	Galway, near Kilcolgan
Rinvyle Point	Galway, near Killary
Tullagh Bay	Donegal
Tullaghan Bay	Mayo
White Strand	Clare
White Strand Bay	Donegal

== See also ==
- List of beaches in Ireland
- List of islands of Ireland
- List of ports in Ireland
- List of Irish counties by coastline
- List of islands of County Mayo
