= List of beaches in Ireland =

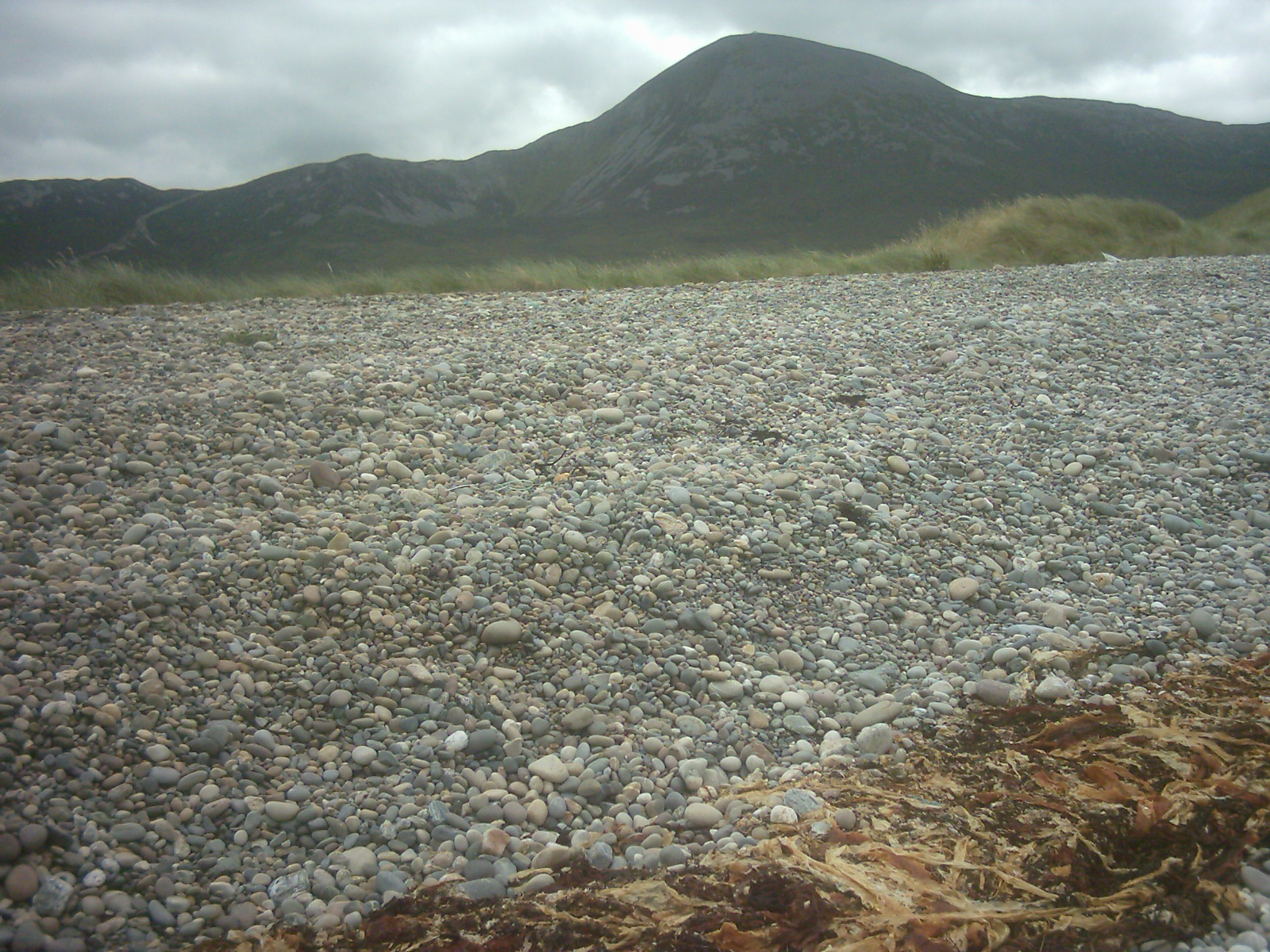
Bertra, a stony beach in County Mayo

This is a list of beaches and bathing areas in Ireland.

== Ulster ==
- County Antrim
  - Ballycastle Beach
  - Portrush (West Strand and Whiterocks Strand)
  - White Park Bay
- County Donegal
  - Ballyhiernan, Fanad
  - Carrickfinn
  - Culdaff
  - Drumnatinny
  - Fintra
  - Five Fingers Strand
  - Killahoey Strand, Dunfanaghy
  - Kinnagoe Bay
  - Lady's Bay, Buncrana
  - Lisfannon Strand
  - Magheraclogher Strand
  - Marble Hill
  - Murder Hole Beach
  - Murvagh
  - Narin
  - Pollan Strand, Doagh Island
  - Port Arthur, Derrybeg
  - Portnablagh
  - Portsalon (officially Stocker Strand and Warden Strand)
  - Rathmullan Strand
  - Rosapenna Strand, also known as Tramore Strand, Rosguill
  - Rossnowlagh Strand, also known as Belall Strand
  - Shrove Strand
  - Tullan Strand, Bundoran
- County Down
  - Ballyholme Strand
  - Cranfield Beach
  - Helen's Bay
  - Newcastle Strand
  - Tyrella Strand
- County Londonderry
  - Benone Strand
  - Castlerock Strand
  - Magilligan Strand
  - Portstewart Strand

== Munster ==
- County Clare
  - Ballyallia Lake, Ennis
  - Ballycuggeran
  - Bishopsquarter
  - Cappagh Pier, Kilrush
  - Fanore
  - Kilkee
  - Lahinch
  - Mountshannon, Lough Derg
  - Spanish Point
  - White Strand, Doonbeg
  - White Strand, Miltown Malbay
- County Cork
  - Barley Cove
  - Coolmaine
  - Fountainstown
  - Garretstown
  - Garrylucas, White Strand
  - Garryvoe
  - Inchydoney
  - Owenahincha, Little Island Strand
  - Redbarn
  - Tragumna
  - Warren, Cregane Strand
  - Youghal, Claycastle
  - Youghal, Front strand beach
- County Kerry
  - Ballinskelligs
  - Ballybunion North
  - Ballybunion South
  - Ballyheigue
  - Banna Strand
  - Castlegregory
  - Derrynane
  - Fenit
  - Inch
  - Inny strand, Waterville
  - Kells
  - Maharabeg
  - Rossbeigh, White Strand
  - Ventry
  - White Strand, Caherciveen
- County Waterford
  - Ardmore Beach
  - Bunmahon Beach
  - Clonea Beach
  - Counsellor's Strand, Dunmore East
  - Dunmore Strand, Dunmore East
  - Tramore Strand

== Connacht ==
- County Galway
  - An Trá Mór, Coill Rua, Inverin
  - Ballyloughane Beach
  - Bathing Place at Portumna
  - Céibh an Spidéil
  - Cill Mhuirbhigh, Inis Mór
  - Clifden Beach
  - Goirtín, Cloch Na Rón
  - Grattan Road Beach
  - Loughrea Lake
  - Salthill Beach
  - Silverstrand Beach
  - Trá an Dóilín, Carraroe
  - Trá Chaladh Fínis, Carna
  - Trá na bhForbacha, Furbo
  - Trá na mBan, Spiddal
  - Traught, Kinvara
- County Leitrim
  - Keeldra Lough
- County Mayo
  - Achill Island: Dooega Beach
  - Achill Island: Dugort Beach
  - Achill Island: Golden Strand
  - Achill Island: Keel Beach
  - Achill Island: Keem Beach
  - Belmullet: Elly Bay
  - Belmullet: Mullaghroe Beach
  - Bertra Beach, Murrisk
  - Louisburgh: Carrowmore Beach
  - Louisburgh: Carrowniskey
  - Louisburgh: Clare Island
  - Louisburgh: Old Head Beach
  - Louisburgh: Silver Strand
  - Louisburgh: Uggool Beach
  - Mulranny Beach
  - Rinroe Beach, Corrowigue
  - Ross Beach, Killala
- County Sligo
  - Dunmoran Beach
  - Enniscrone Beach
  - Mullaghmore Beach
  - Rosses Point Beach
  - Streedagh Beach

== Leinster ==
- County Dublin
  - Balbriggan (Front Strand Beach)
  - Claremont Beach
  - Dollymount Strand
  - Donabate (Balcarrick Beach)
  - Killiney
  - Loughshinny Beach
  - Malahide Beach
  - Merrion Strand
  - Portmarnock (Velvet Strand Beach)
  - Portrane (the Brook Beach)
  - Rush (South Beach)
  - Sandymount Strand
  - Seapoint
  - Skerries (South Beach)
  - Sutton (Burrow Beach)
- County Louth
  - Clogherhead Beach
  - Port (Lurganboy)
  - Seapoint
  - Shelling Hill Beach, also known as Templetown Beach
- County Meath
  - Laytown / Bettystown
- County Westmeath
  - Lilliput, Lough Ennel
  - Portnashangan, Lough Owel
  - The Cut, Lough Lene
- County Wexford
  - Ballymoney, North Beach
  - Courtown, North Beach
  - Curracloe
  - Duncannon
  - Morriscastle
  - Rosslare Strand
- County Wicklow
  - Bray South Promenade
  - Brittas Bay North
  - Brittas Bay South
  - Clogga
  - Martin Kellys private beach
  - Greystones South
  - Silver Strand

== See also ==
- List of beaches
- Coastal landforms of Ireland

== Resources ==
- Beaches.ie, an Irish beach quality website (originally known as "Splash" at bathingwater.ie) launched in 2009 by the Environmental Protection Agency.
