= Murder Hole Beach =

Bay in County Donegal, Ireland

Coordinates: 55°14′16″N 7°48′27″W

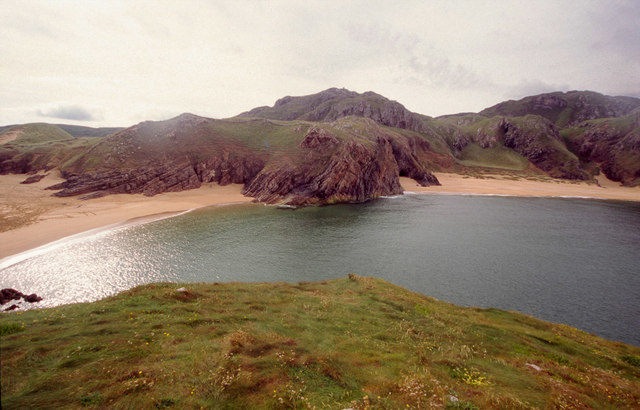
View of Murder Hole Beach from Rough Island, a tidal island

Boyeeghter Strand or Boyeeghter Bay, (Irish: Bá Íochtair) commonly known as The Murder Hole Beach, is a beach situated on Rosguill, a peninsula located on the north coast of County Donegal in the north-west of Ulster, the northern province in Ireland. The beach lies at the north-eastern end of Rosguill, being located near Melmore Head. It has cliffs, hills, dunes, and small caves. When the tide is in there are two beaches, which merge into one when the tide is out. Rough Island is a small tidal island located approximately 15 metres offshore. The beach is not suitable for swimming.

The area is undeveloped with no direct road access, and significant traffic issues were reported during August 2020. Prior to 2022, beach access was possible only via a route across private land, and an increase in visitors during 2018 prompted a local landowner to post a notice about access concerns. By April 2022, another local landowner had built a carpark and spent several "months developing a pathway at Melmore [..providing access..] from a different route".

== Etymology ==
The English name of the beach, Boyeeghter Strand, derives from the Irish Trá Bhá Íochtair meaning the 'strand of the lower (or northern) bay'.

The common name of the beach, Murder Hole Beach, is rumoured to originate from the nineteenth-century, when a young woman reputedly fell from a cliff near the beach. Other reports suggest that the name is derived from how the dangerous currents make swimming perilous.

== See also ==
- List of beaches in Ireland
