= Moher Tower =

- Irish: Túr an Mhothair
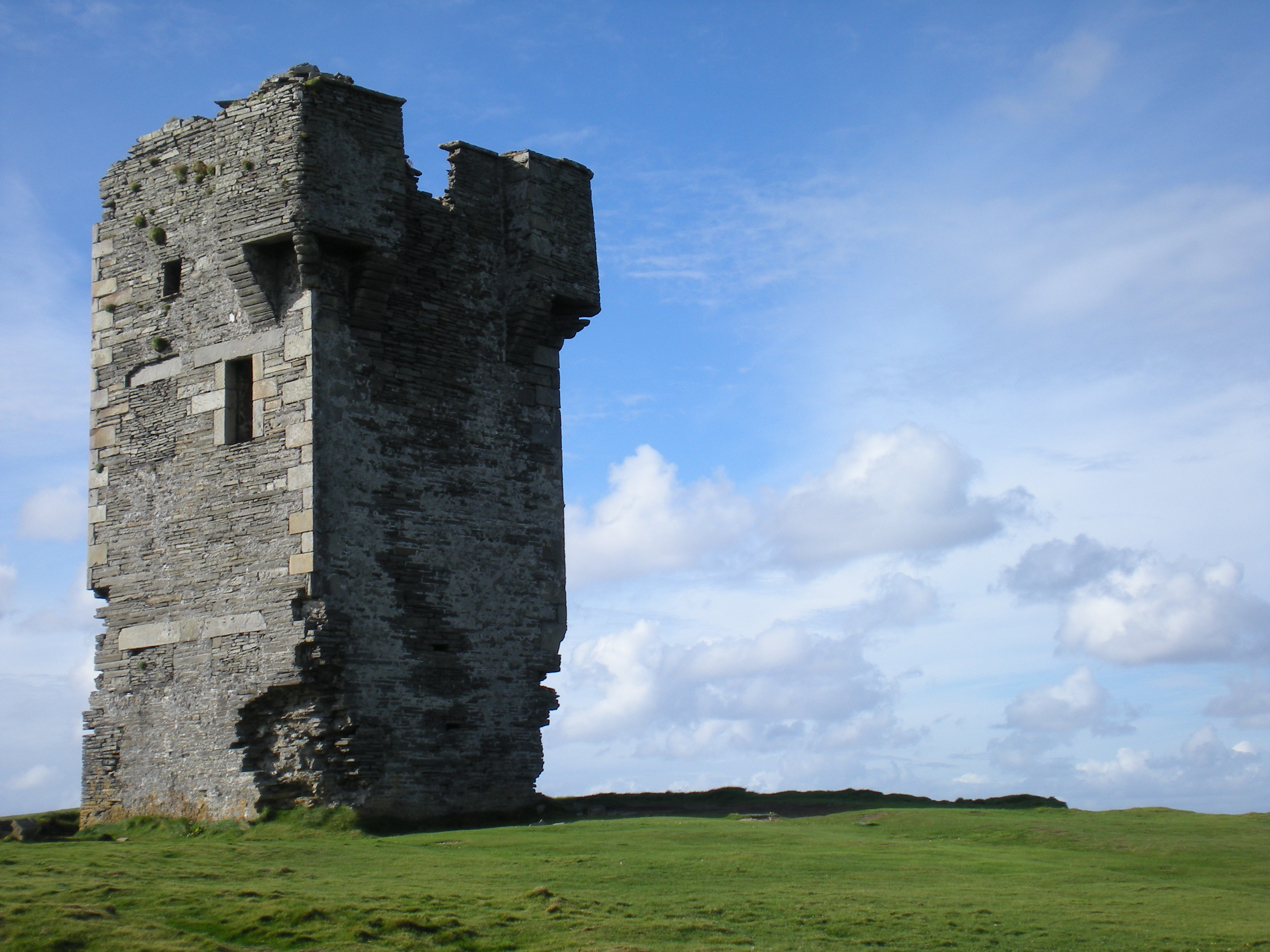
- Moher Tower

- Location within Ireland
- Former names: Moher Uí Ruis or Moher Uí Ruidhin

General information
- Status: ruin
- Type: signaling/watchtower
- Location: Hag's Head, County Clare, Ireland
- Coordinates: 52.948212°N 9.467861°W
- Estimated completion: c.1808

Moher Tower (Irish: Túr an Mhothair; historically Moher Uí Ruis or Moher Uí Ruidhin) is the stone ruin of an old Napoleonic-era watchtower which stands on Hag's Head, at the southern end of the Cliffs of Moher, in County Clare, Ireland.

== History ==
The current tower (which was built c.1808) stands close to the site of a much earlier promontory fort, known as Mothar or Moher. This earlier fortification stood until at least 1780 and is mentioned in an account from John Lloyd's a Short Tour Of Clare (1780). The earlier fortification was demolished in 1808 to provide material for a new lookout/signaling tower. This was built nearby during the Napoleonic Wars (1803–1815), at a time when similar towers were built along Atlantic coasts to counter fears of invasion during Napoleon's reign in Europe.

== Construction and use ==
The building is a single, nearly square, tower with two rectilinear bartizans protruding from the top of its eastern wall, and one from the western wall. Facing the Atlantic Ocean, the structure appears to have incorporated a fireplace on at least 2 floors, and a dry stone roof which has since mostly caved in.

In summer the tower ruin is occupied by the many choughs and similar birds native to the area. The tower is sometimes used as a refuge by visitors to the Cliffs of Moher who become stranded on the southern cliff path during storms that blow in from the Atlantic.

== Gallery ==
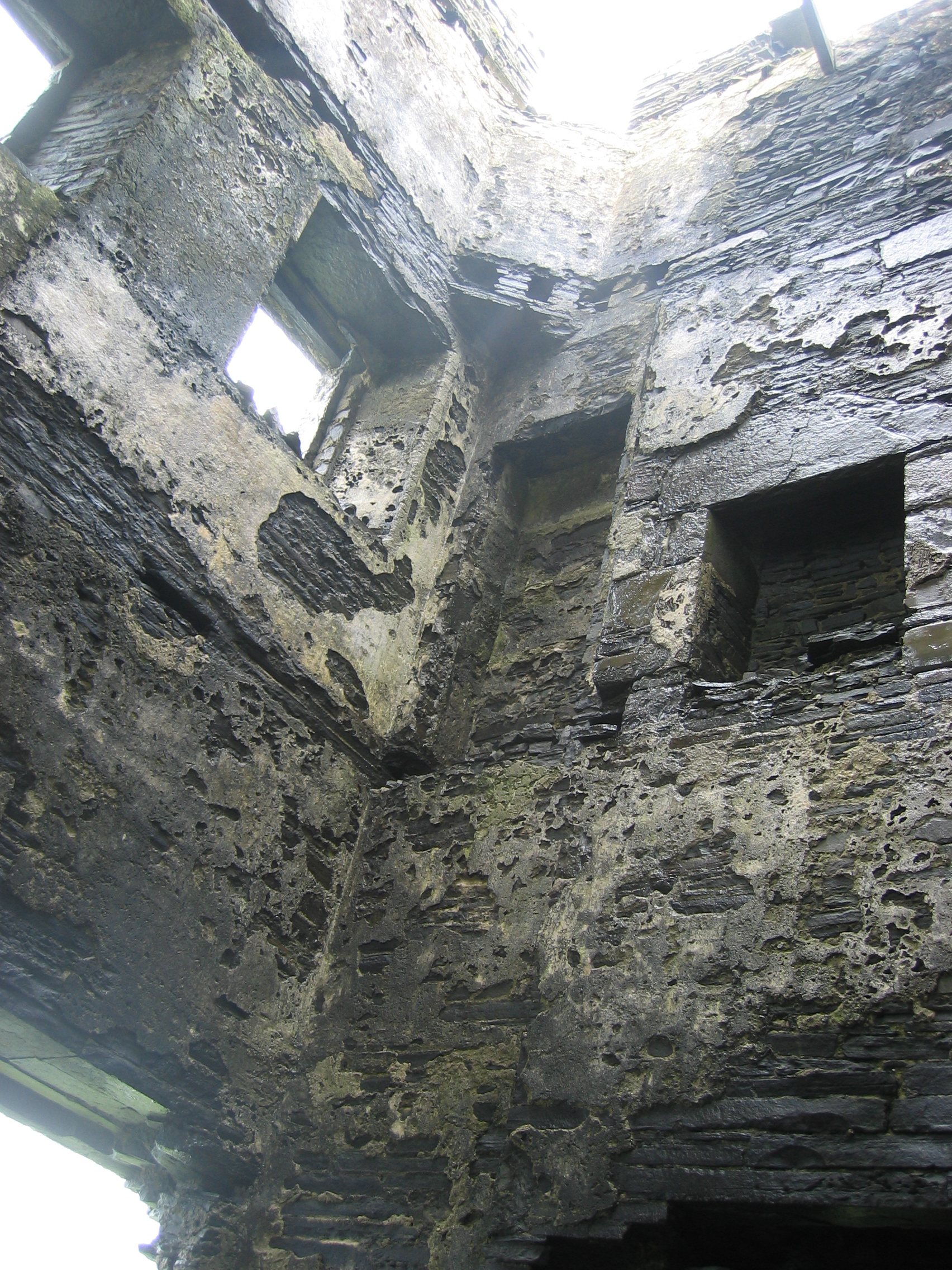
Inside Moher Tower

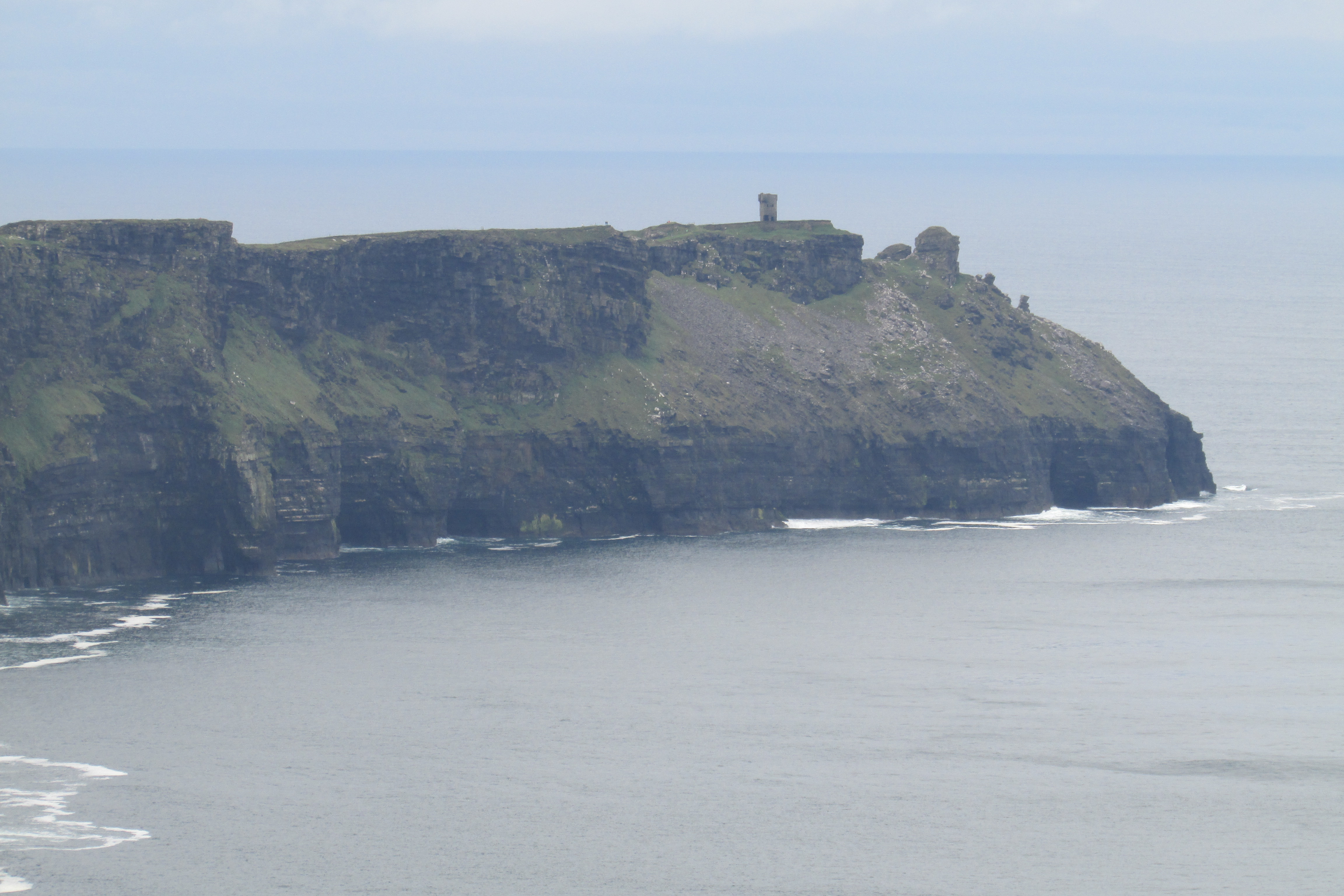
Moher Tower on Hag's Head
