= O'Brien's Tower =

- Túr Uí Bhriain
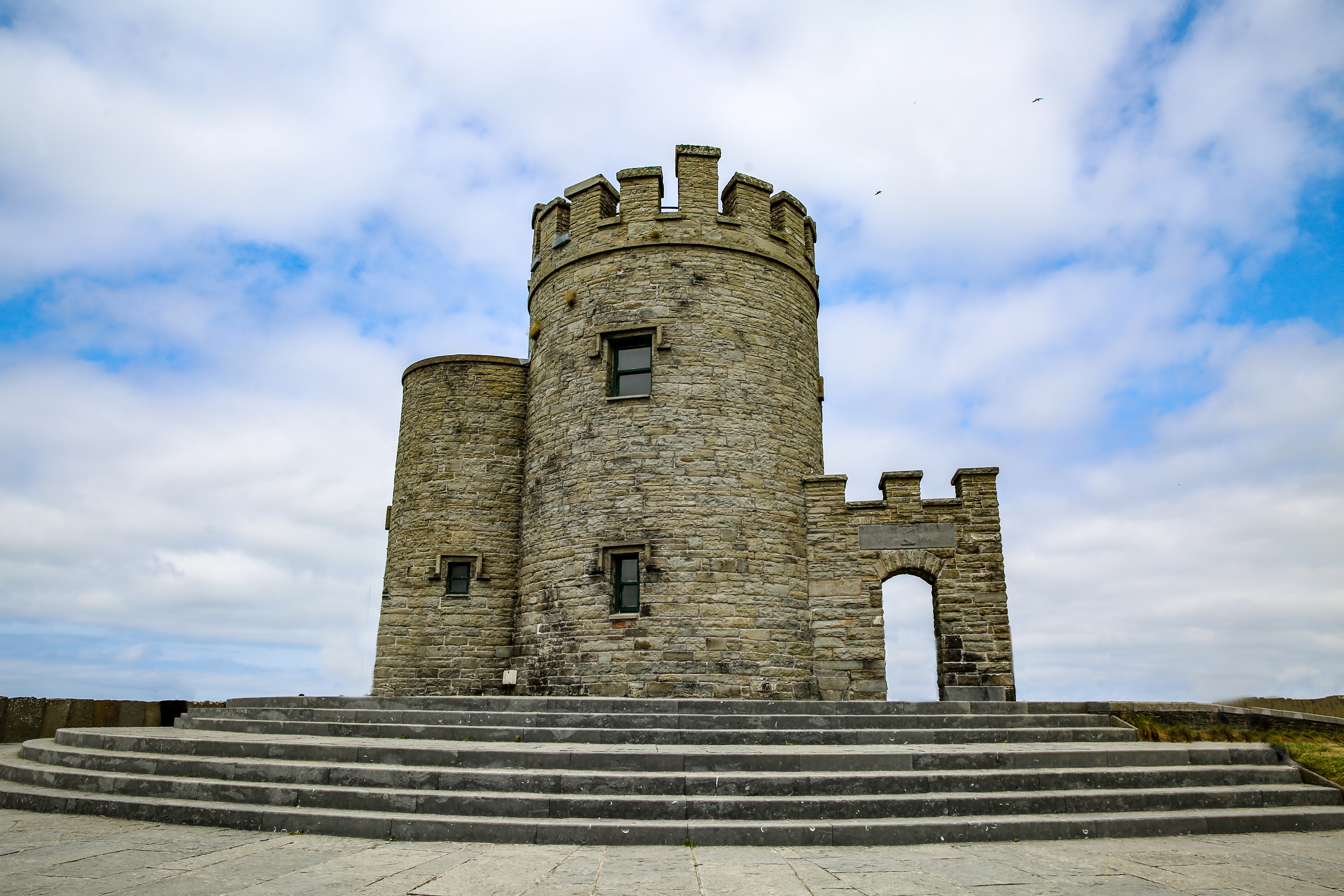
- O'Brien's Tower

- Location within Ireland

General information
- Status: in use
- Type: Observation tower
- Location: Cliffs of Moher, County Clare, Liscannor, Ireland
- Coordinates: 52°58′22.84″N 9°25′49.93″W
- Elevation: 188 m (617 ft)
- Named for: Cornelius O'Brien
- Opened: 1835; 191 years ago
- Client: Cornelius O'Brien

Technical details
- Material: limestone
- Floor count: 3

O'Brien's Tower marks the highest point of the Cliffs of Moher in County Clare, Ireland. It is located a short distance from the villages Doolin and Liscannor.

It is one of the most photographed Irish landmarks.

== History ==
The tower was built on the cliffs in 1835 by local landlord and MP Cornelius O'Brien as an observation tower for the tourists who frequented the cliffs at the time: "strangers visiting the Magnificent Scenery of this neighbourhood". It is said to have initially served as a teahouse, featuring a large round table with seats of ironwork.

On a clear day the view can extend as far as Loop Head at the southern tip of Clare and beyond to the mountains of Kerry. Looking north, the Twelve Bens in Connemara (also known as the Twelve Pins) beyond Galway Bay can be seen, and typically the Aran Islands to the west.

== Gallery ==
O'Brien's Tower along the Cliffs of Moher as seen on a clear day.

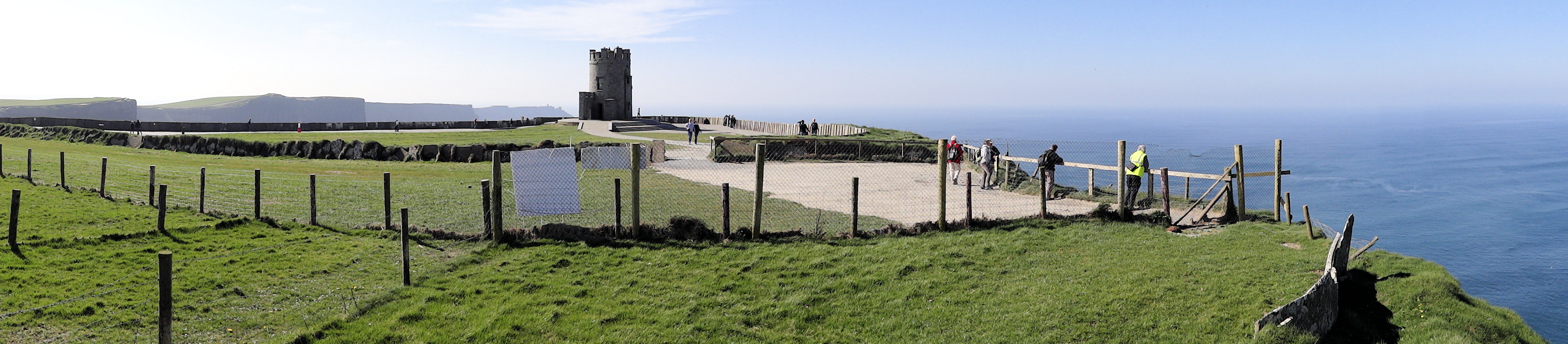
The plateau where the tower is located, fenced off to discourage potentially dangerous hiking.

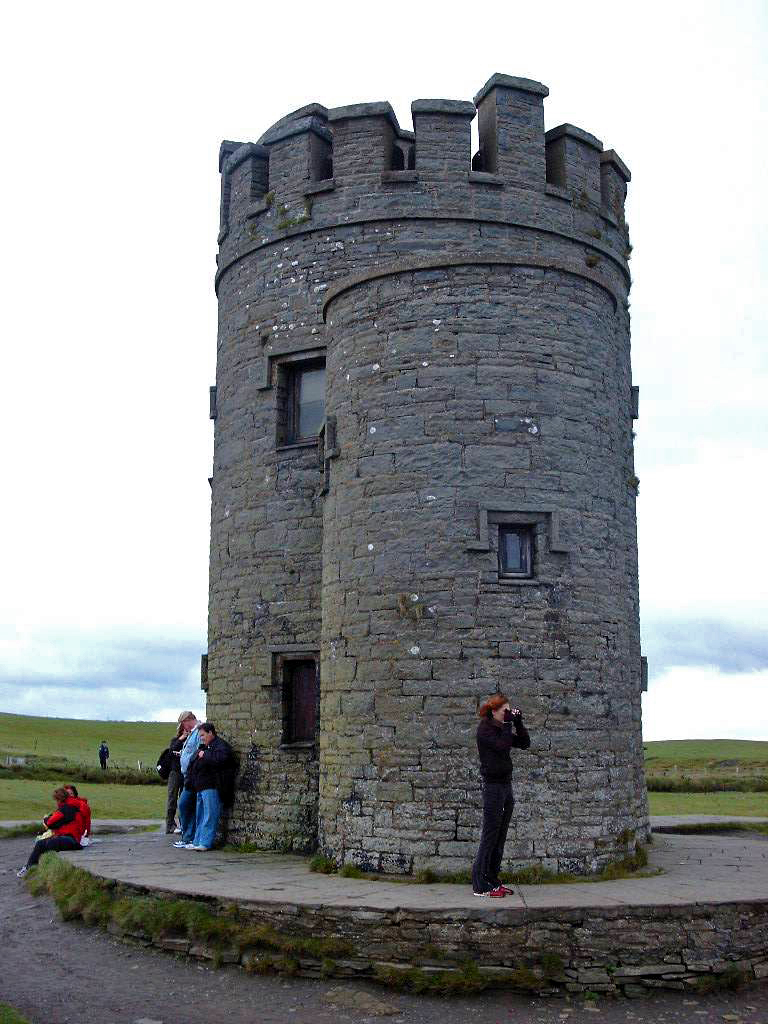
O'Brien's Tower from up-close.

Tourists gathering near the tower.
