= Hag's Head =

Cliffs of Moher, Ireland

Coordinates: 52°56′10″N 9°28′15″W

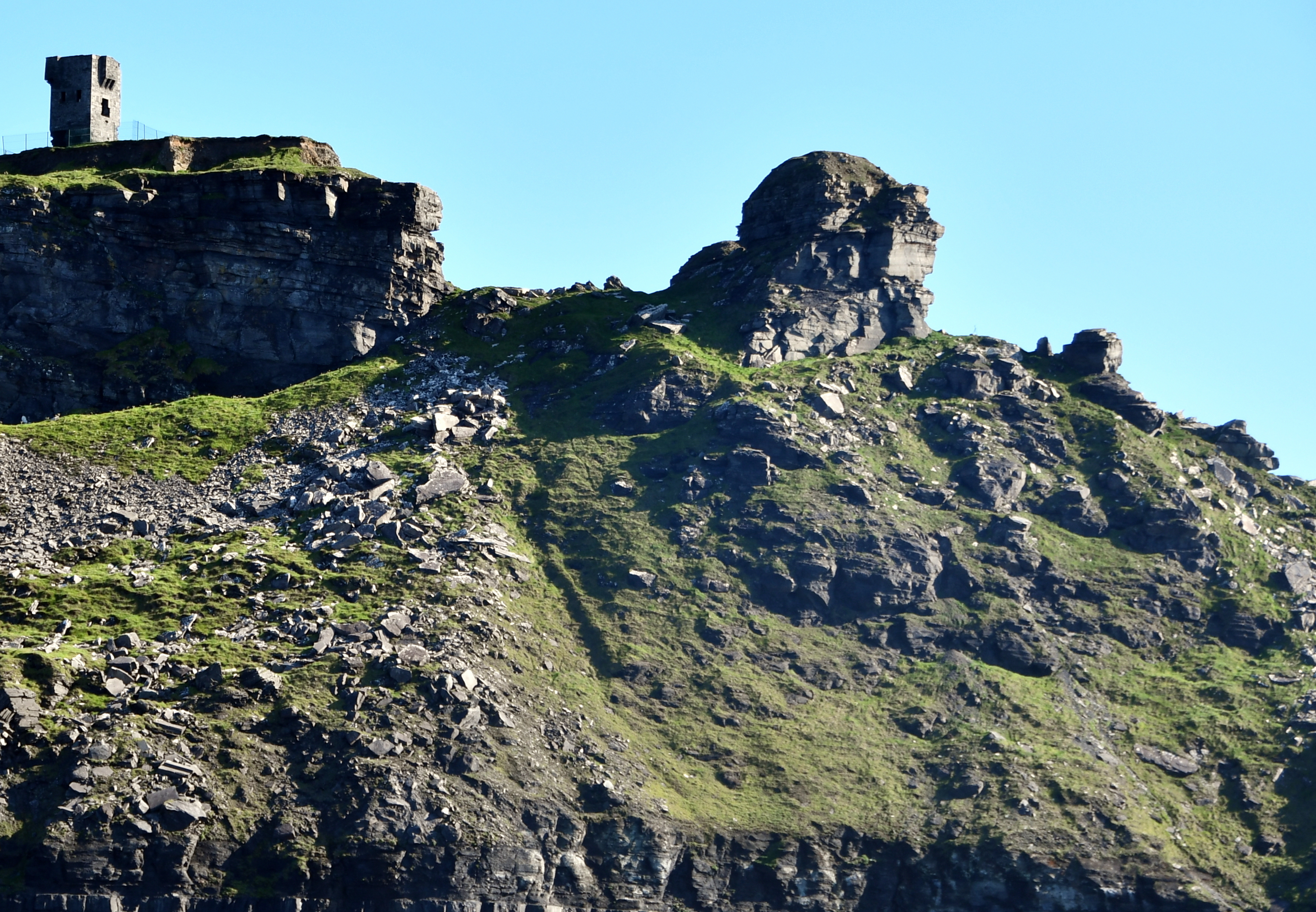
Hag's Head with face part visible - as seen from ocean.

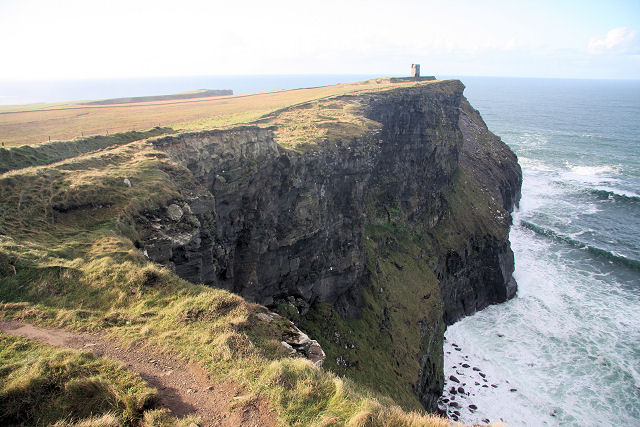
View of the headland

Rock formation on Hag's Head

Hag's Head is the name given to the most southerly point of the Cliffs of Moher in County Clare, Ireland, where the cliffs form an unusual rock formation that resembles a woman's head looking out to sea. It provides a vantage point over much of the cliff formation.

== Etymology ==
A local legend relates how an old hag or sea-witch, Mal of Malbay, fell in love with the Irish hero, Cú Chulainn and chased her would-be suitor across Ireland. Cú Chulainn escaped by hopping across sea stacks as if they were stepping stones. Mal, however, not being so nimble lost her footing and was dashed against the rocks.

== Features ==
A tower ruin known as Moher Tower stands at Hag's Head. Until the early 19th century, it was the site of a promontory fort known as Mothar or Moher. Hag's head also features a natural arch.
