= Cliffs of Moher =

Sea cliffs in County Clare, Ireland

- Aillte an Mhothair (Irish)
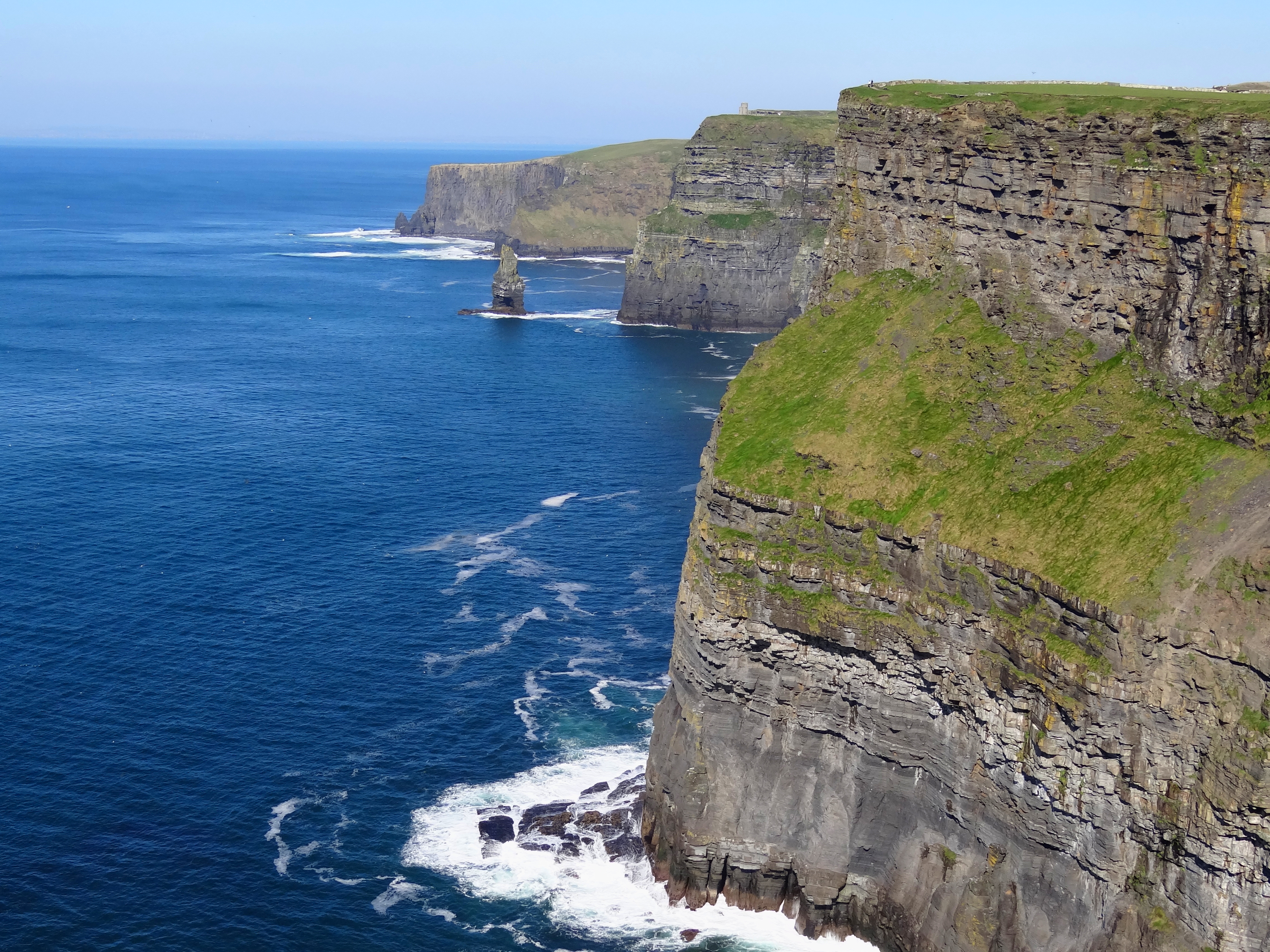
- Looking north towards O'Brien's Tower

- Location within Ireland
- 52°58′18.302″N 9°25′34.802″W
- Nearest city: Lahinch, County Clare, Ireland

Site notes
- Elevation: 155 m (509 ft)
- Owner: Clare County Council, private farmers
- Website: cliffsofmoher.ie

Aerial video of the cliffs (2014)

The Cliffs of Moher (/ˈmʌhər/; Irish: Aillte an Mhothair) are sea cliffs located at the southwestern edge of the Burren region in County Clare, Ireland. They run for about 14 kilometres (9 miles). At their southern end, they rise 120 metres (390 ft) above the Atlantic Ocean at Hag's Head, and, 8 kilometres (5 miles) to the north, they reach their maximum height of 214 metres (702 ft) just north of O'Brien's Tower, a round stone tower near the midpoint of the cliffs, built in 1835 by Sir Cornelius O'Brien, then continue at lower heights. The closest settlements are the villages of Liscannor 6 km (4 miles) to the south, and Doolin 7 km (4 miles) to the north.

From the cliffs, and from atop the tower, visitors can see the Aran Islands in Galway Bay, the Maumturks and Twelve Pins mountain ranges to the north in County Galway, and Loop Head to the south. The cliffs rank among the most visited tourist sites in Ireland, with around 1.5 million visits per year.

== Name ==
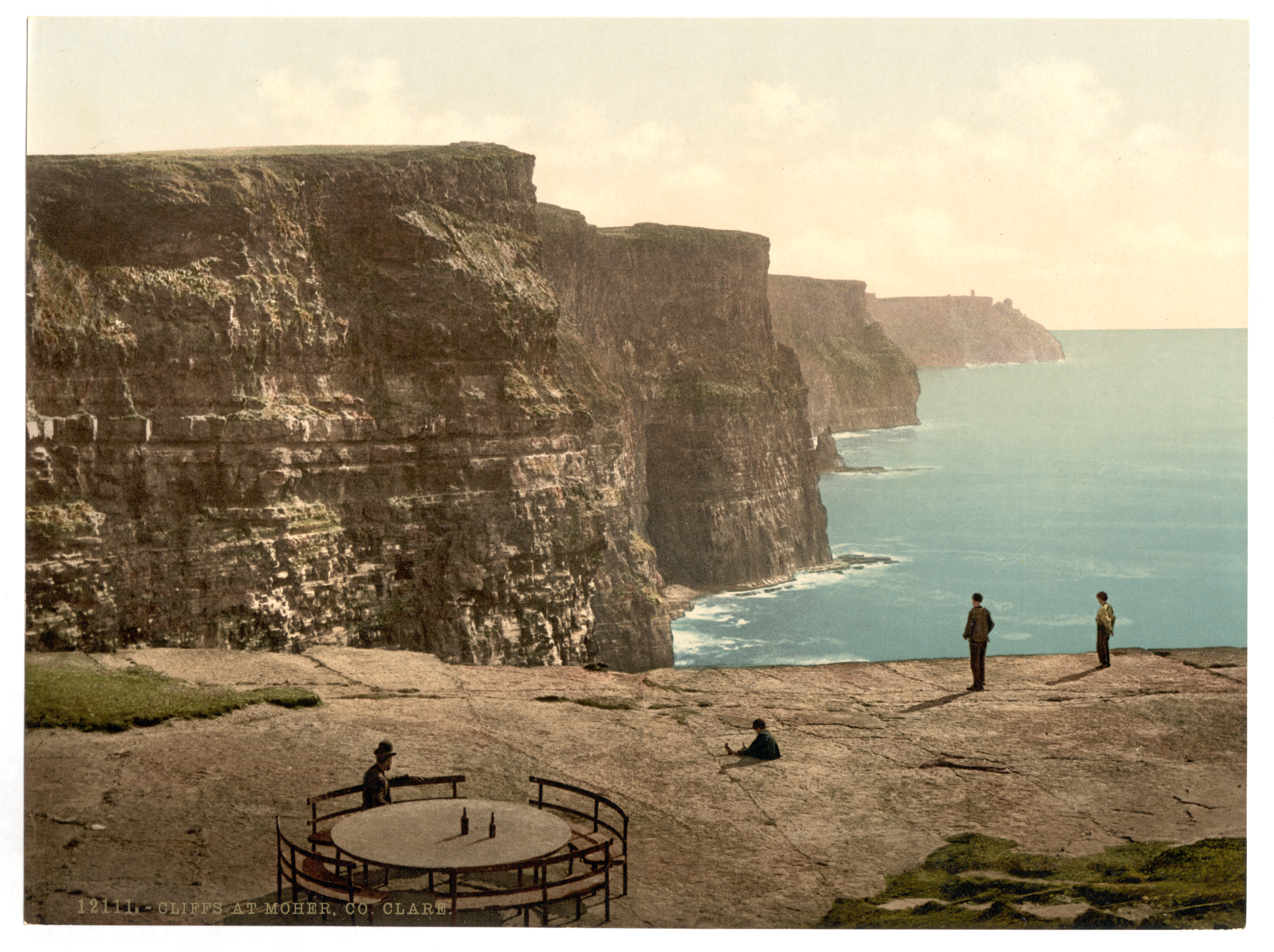
A 19th-century Photochrom postcard of the cliffs, with Leacmayornagneeve rock in the foreground

The cliffs take their name from an old promontory fort called Mothar or Moher, which once stood on Hag's Head, the southernmost point of the cliffed coast, now the site of Moher Tower. The writer Thomas Johnson Westropp referred to it in 1905 as Moher Uí Ruis or Moher Uí Ruidhin. The fort still stood in 1780 and is mentioned in an account from John Lloyd's A Short Tour of Clare (1780). It was demolished in 1808 to provide material for a lookout/telegraph tower that was intended to provide warning in case of a French invasion during the Napoleonic wars.

== Tourism ==
The cliffs are among the most popular tourist destinations in Ireland; in 2006, they topped a list of attractions by receiving almost one million visitors at the official visitor centre and about half a million elsewhere. In 2022, about 1.1 million people visited—41% of them from the United States. Since 2011, they have formed a part of the Burren and Cliffs of Moher Geopark: geotourism destinations throughout Europe that are members of the European Geoparks Network and also recognized by UNESCO. The cliffs are a "signature point" on the official Wild Atlantic Way tourist trail.

The cliffs can be accessed at multiple points. There is an 18 kilometres (11 miles) Cliff Walk. Most visitors come to the official visitor centre.

=== Visitor centre ===
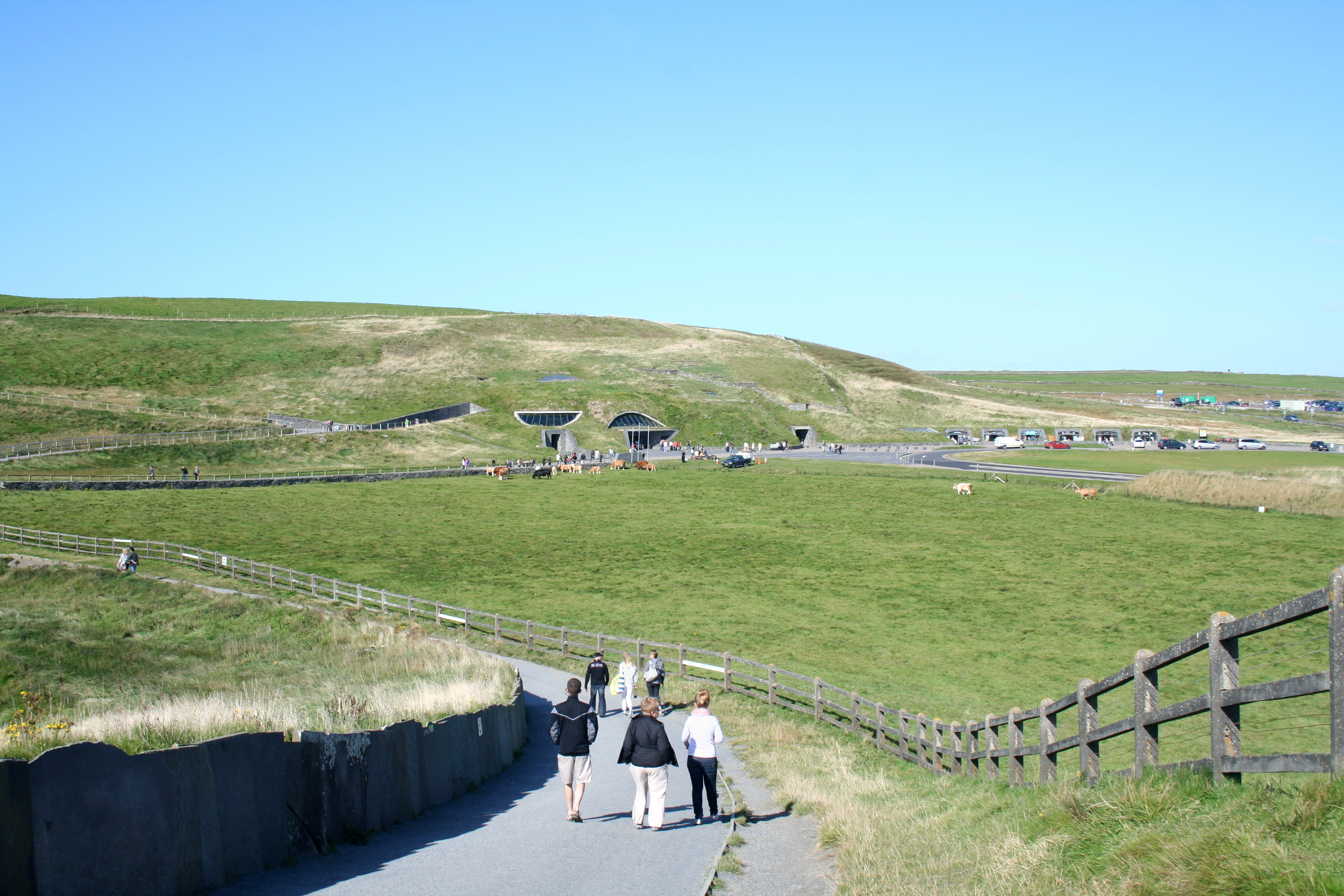
Visitor centre

In the 1990s, the local authority, Clare County Council, began work to enable visitors to experience the cliffs with a minimum of intrusive man-made amenities. A modern visitor centre, the Cliffs of Moher Visitor Experience, was built into a hillside approaching the cliffs. The centre was to use renewable energy systems including geothermal heating and cooling, solar panels, and grey water recycling.

The €32 million facility was planned and built over 17 years; it opened in February 2007. Exhibits include interactive media displays covering the geology, history, flora and fauna of the cliffs. A large multimedia screen displays a bird's-eye view from the cliffs, as well as video from the underwater caves below the cliffs. There are two cafés and several shops.

==== Visitor numbers ====
The visitor experience recorded 1,427,000 visits in 2016, up 14% on 2015, and up 52% in off-peak December, for example. In 2017 the Cliffs of Moher was the second most popular 'fee charging' tourist attraction in the country with 1,527,000 visitors. This increased again by 3.8% in 2018 to 1,580,010 visitors.

To deal with overcrowding at peak times and in peak season, visitors are increasingly encouraged to come at other times, with discounts given to coach operators who book for off-peak slots, and late opening of the centre introduced for July and much of August. Later-arriving visitors have also been facilitated by the fitting of automatically opening exit gates from the official car parking facilities.

==== Recognition ====
The Cliffs of Moher Visitor Experience won an award in the Interpret Britain & Ireland Awards 2007 awarded by the Association of Heritage Interpretation (AHI). Although the award was specifically for the Atlantic Edge exhibition, the AHI assessed the entire visitor centre and site. The citation stated that the entire visitor centre was "one of the best facilities that the judges had ever seen."

=== Viewing ===
The official Cliffs of Moher Coastal Walk runs for 14 km, from Hag's Head to Doolin, passing the Visitor Centre and O'Brien's Tower. There are two paths near the visitor centre, the official one being set back a little for safety, while an unofficial path runs closer to the edge.

In July 2016, the so-called Cliff Walk, outside the official Cliffs of Moher amenities, was temporarily closed because of the risk of rock falls. People were warned to stay on the official path further off the cliff edge instead of the unofficial seaside trail. Injury and even casualties from visitors straying off the trail continued to be a problem despite signage and other prevention initiatives. In February 2025, the coastal walking trail was closed due to these safety issues. The trail remained closed as of September 2025.

Separate ferry trips also allow tourists to view the cliffs from sea level, and at certain times fixed-wing aircraft from Connemara Airport also provide a viewing opportunity.

== Geology and wildlife ==
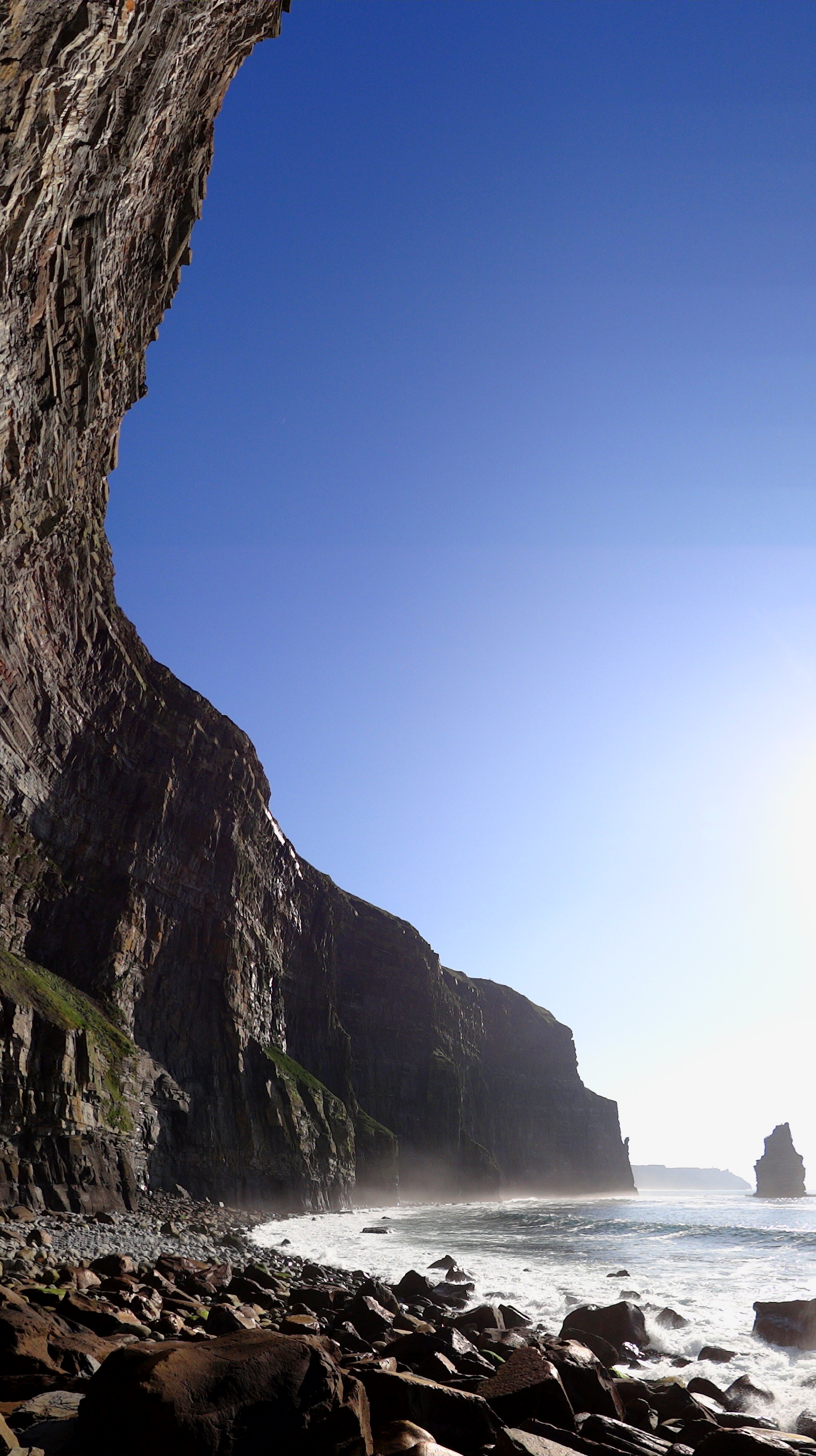
The cliffs seen from the beach

The cliffs consist mainly of beds of Namurian shale and sandstone, and the oldest rocks are at the bottom of the cliffs. During the time of their formation between 313 and 326 million years ago, a river dumped sand, silt and clay into an ancient marine basin. Over millions of years, the sediments collecting at the mouth of this ancient delta were compacted and lithified into the sedimentary strata preserved in the now-exposed cliffs. The area is considered a geologic laboratory that preserves a record of deltaic deposition in deep water. Individual strata vary in thickness from just a few centimetres to several metres, each representing a specific depositional event in the history of the delta. In aggregate, up to 200 metres of sedimentary rocks are exposed in the Cliffs of Moher. Trace fossils are abundant, comprising two main types: (1) scolicia or worming trails, which are interpreted as feeding trails left by as-yet-unidentified invertebrates, and (2) burrow marks, which are circular features preserved as casts of burrows once occupied by as-yet-unidentified marine creatures. Ripple marks are preserved in some stones.

Today the cliffs are subject to erosion by wave action, which undermines the base of support causing the cliff to collapse under its own weight. This process creates a variety of coastal landforms characteristic of erosional coasts such as sea caves, sea stacks, and sea stumps. Branaunmore, a 67-metre high sea stack at the foot of the Cliffs of Moher below O'Brien's Tower, was once part of the cliffs, but coastal erosion gradually removed the layers of rock that joined it with the mainland. A large sea arch can also be seen at Hag's Head below the Napoleonic signal tower and many smaller sea arches can be seen from sea level.

It is possible to see 300-million-year-old river channels cutting through, forming unconformities at the base of the cliffs.

At peak season, there are an estimated 30,000 pairs of birds living on the cliffs, representing more than 20 species. These include Atlantic puffins, which live in large colonies at isolated parts of the cliffs and on the small Goat Island, and razorbills. The site is an Important Bird Area.

A wide range of sea life can also be seen, from grey seals through porpoises, dolphins, minke whales and basking sharks, as well as, occasionally, sunfish. On land, feral goats, foxes, badgers and the Irish hare are found, along with various breeds of farm cattle.

== Popular culture ==
The Cliffs of Moher have appeared in numerous media. In cinema, the cliffs have appeared in several films, including The Princess Bride (1987) (as the filming location for "The Cliffs of Insanity"), Harry Potter and the Half-Blood Prince (2009) (as the filming location for where Harry Potter and Professor Dumbledore are looking for a horcrux in a sea cave), Leap Year (2010) and Irish Wish (2024). The cliffs are mentioned in the Martin Scorsese film Bringing Out the Dead (1999) and are noted in the 2008 documentary Waveriders as the location of a large surfing wave known as "Aileens".

In music, the cliffs have been the scene for music videos, including Maroon 5's "Runaway", Westlife's "My Love", and Rich Mullins' "The Color Green". In 1999, most of singer Dusty Springfield's ashes were scattered at the cliffs by her brother Tom. There is also an Irish fiddle tune called The Cliffs of Moher.

== Transport ==
Bus Éireann route 350 links the Cliffs of Moher to several locations: Ennis, Ennistymon, Doolin, Lisdoonvarna, Kinvara and Galway. This service includes a number of journeys each way daily. There is also a privately operated shuttle bus that serves the site from Doolin.

== Gallery ==
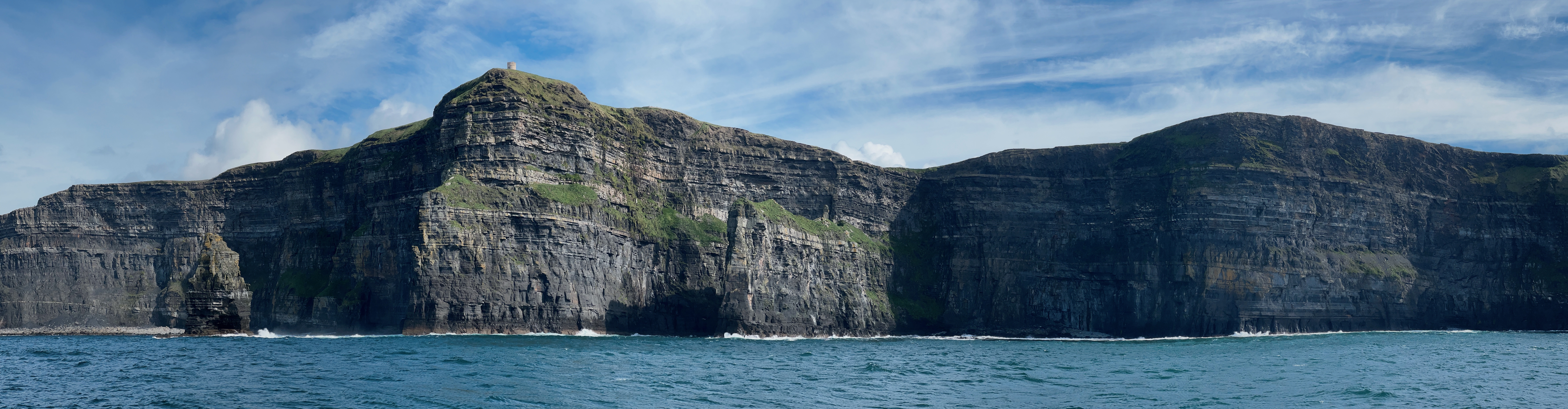
Panorama perspective from sea level

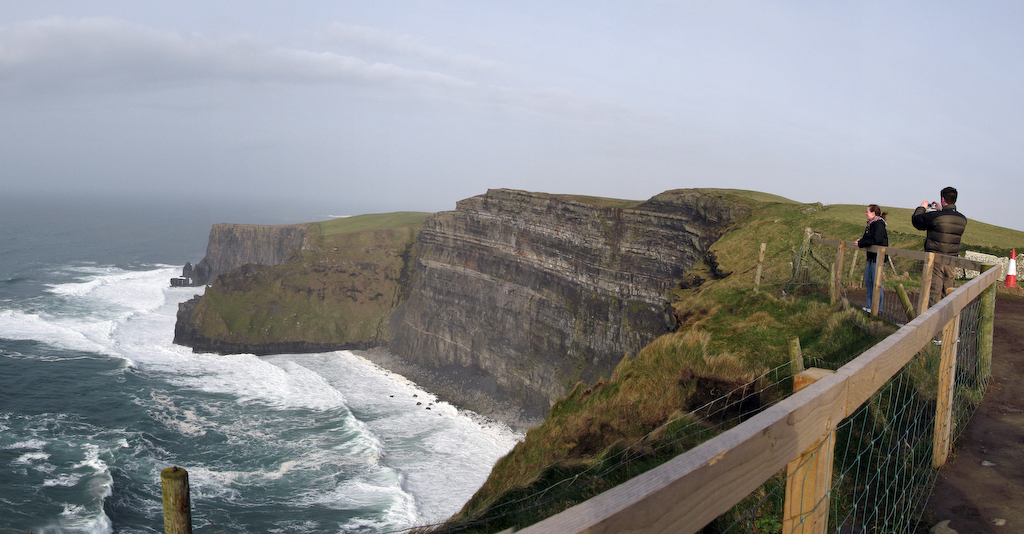
A wide perspective

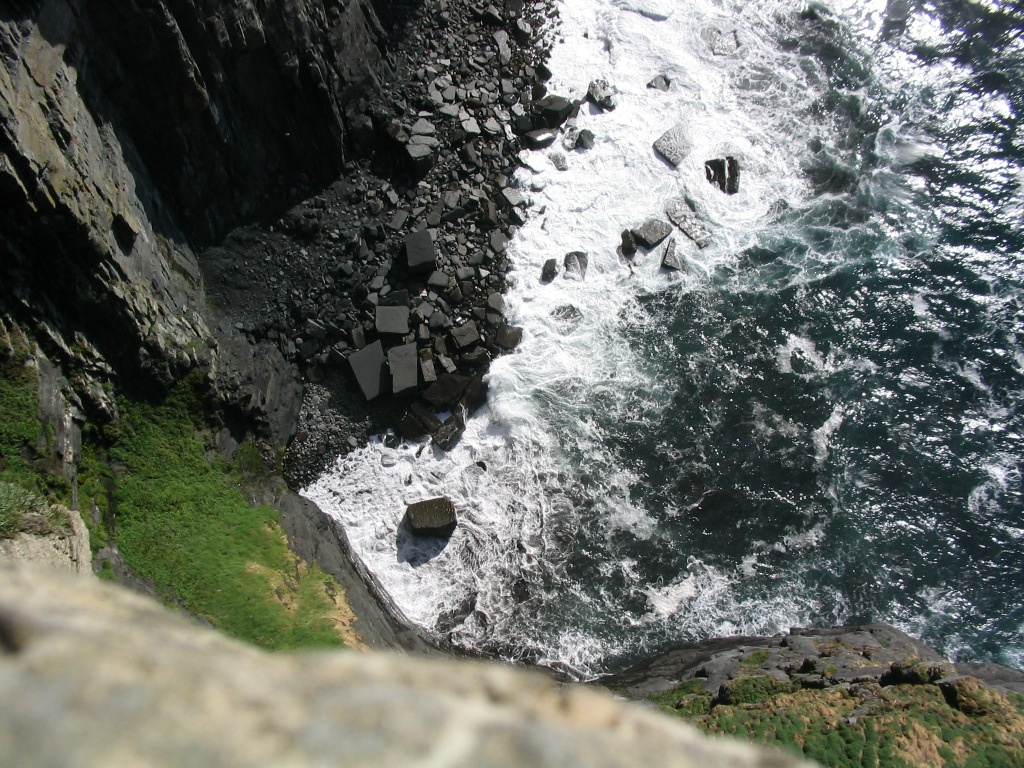
A 200-metre drop

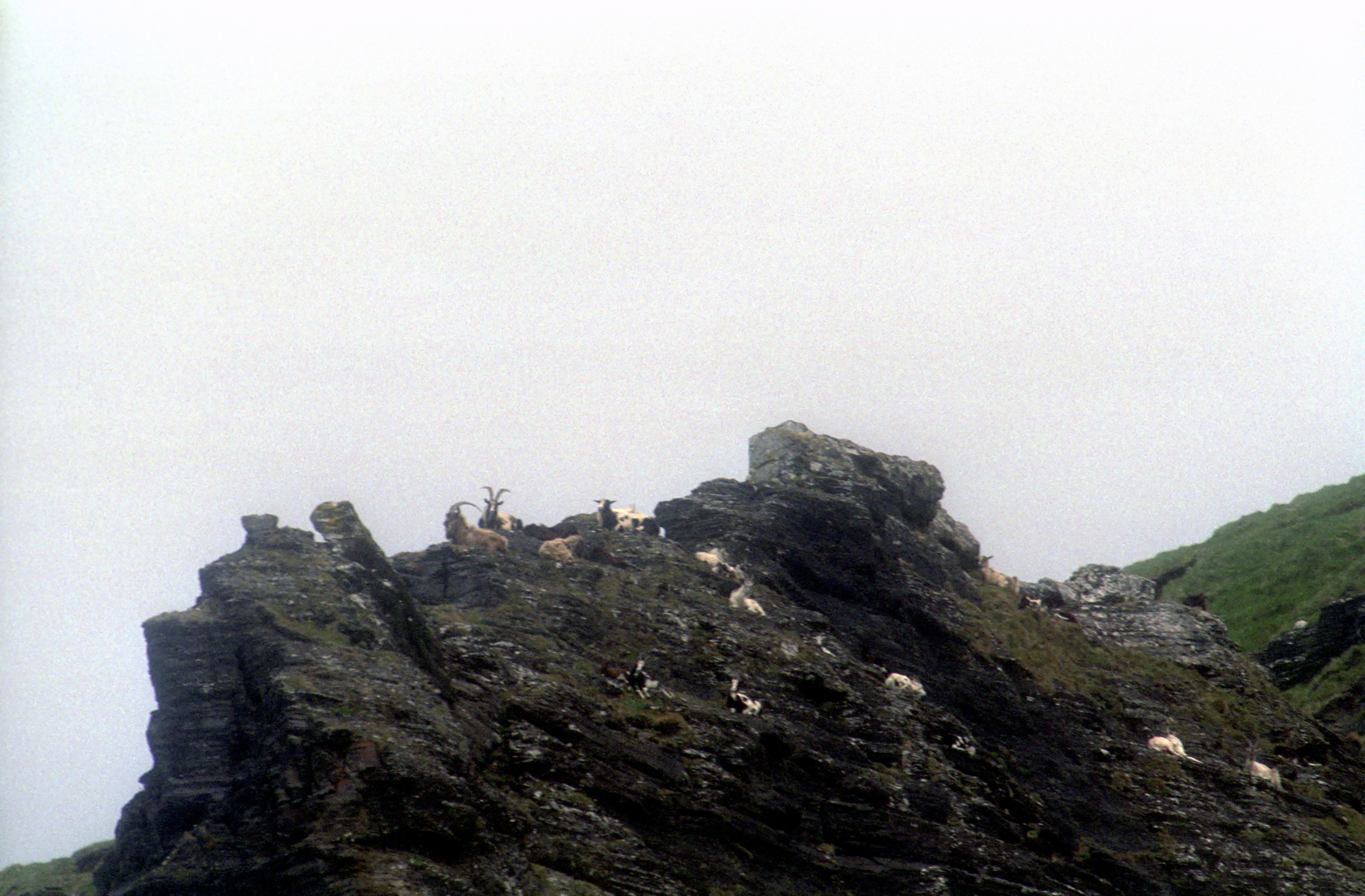
Local feral Bilberry goats

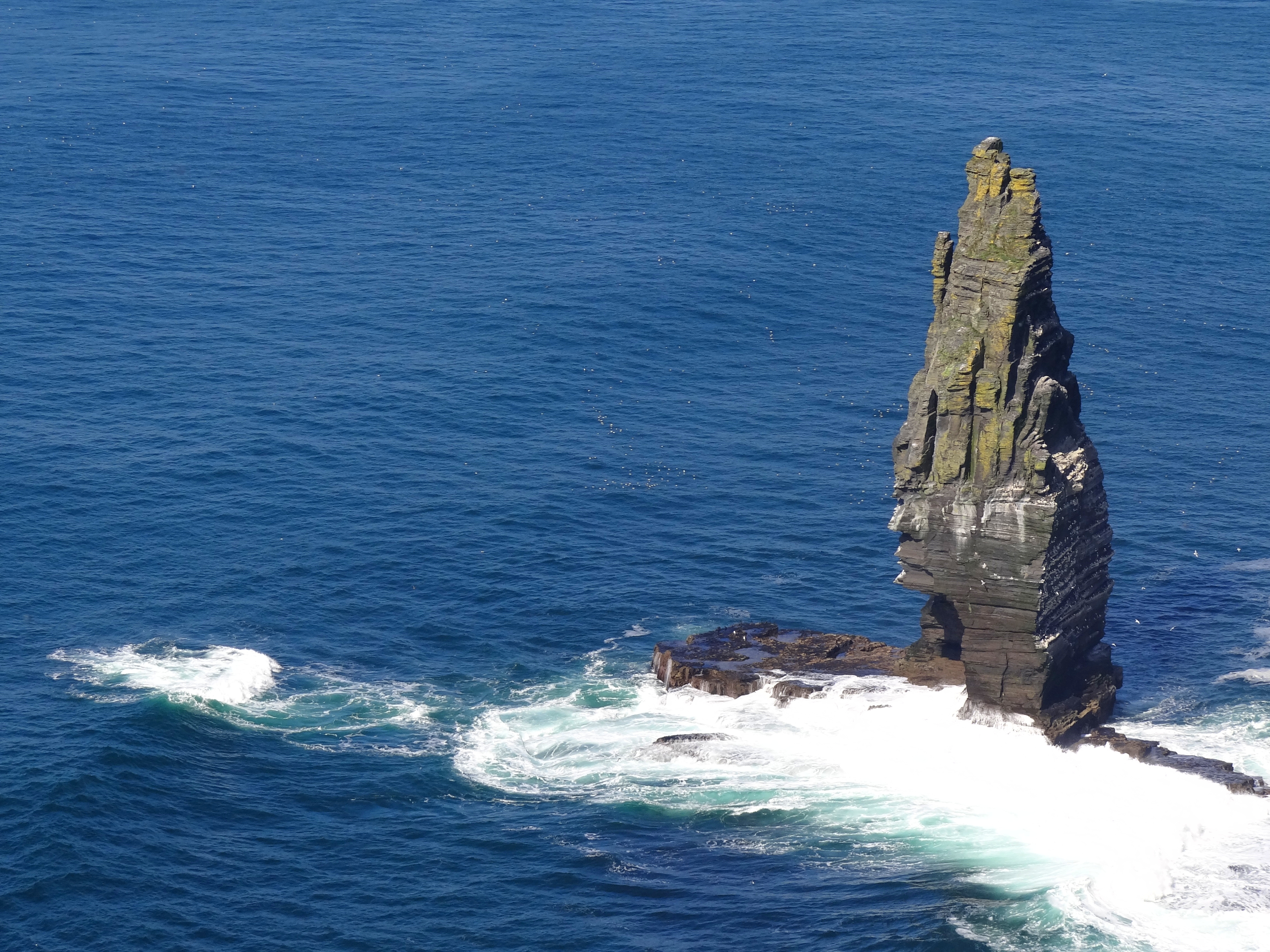
Branaunmore sea stack

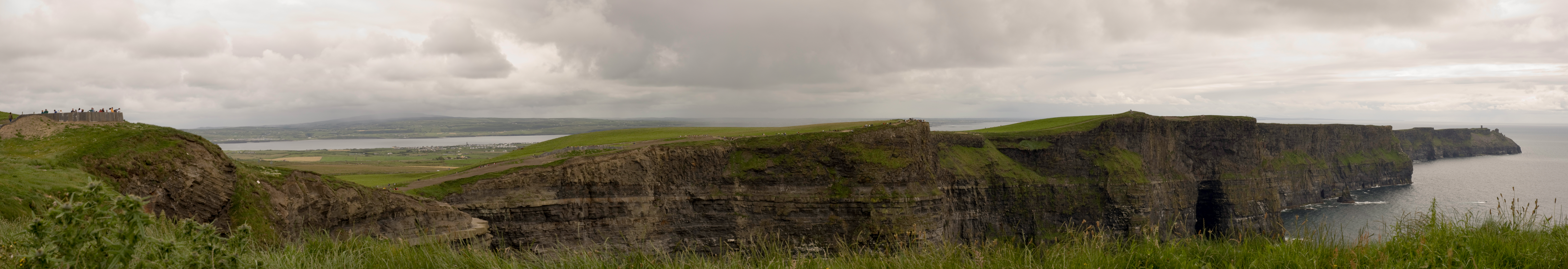
Panorama from below O'Brien's Tower

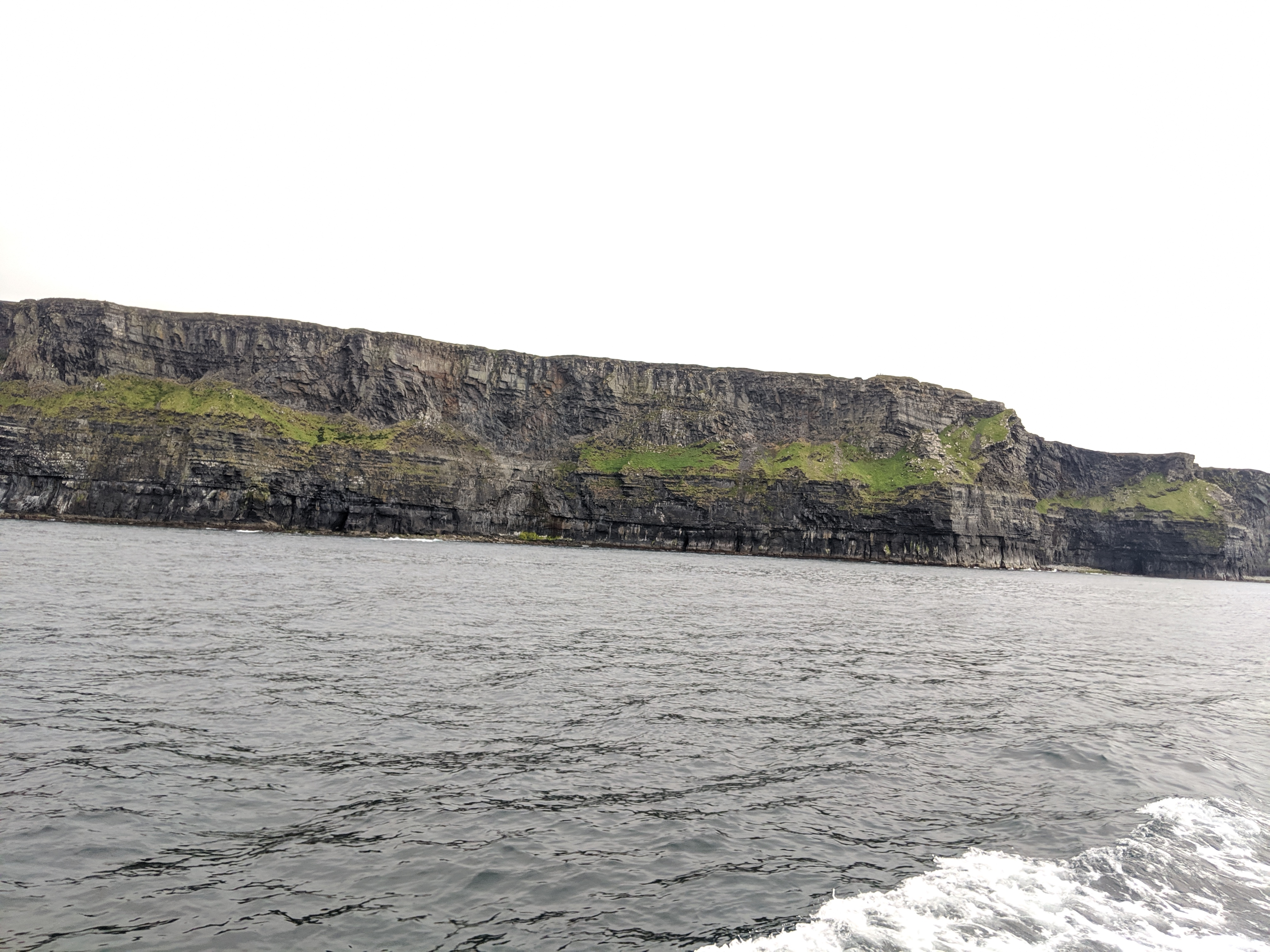
Cliffs of Moher seen from ferry

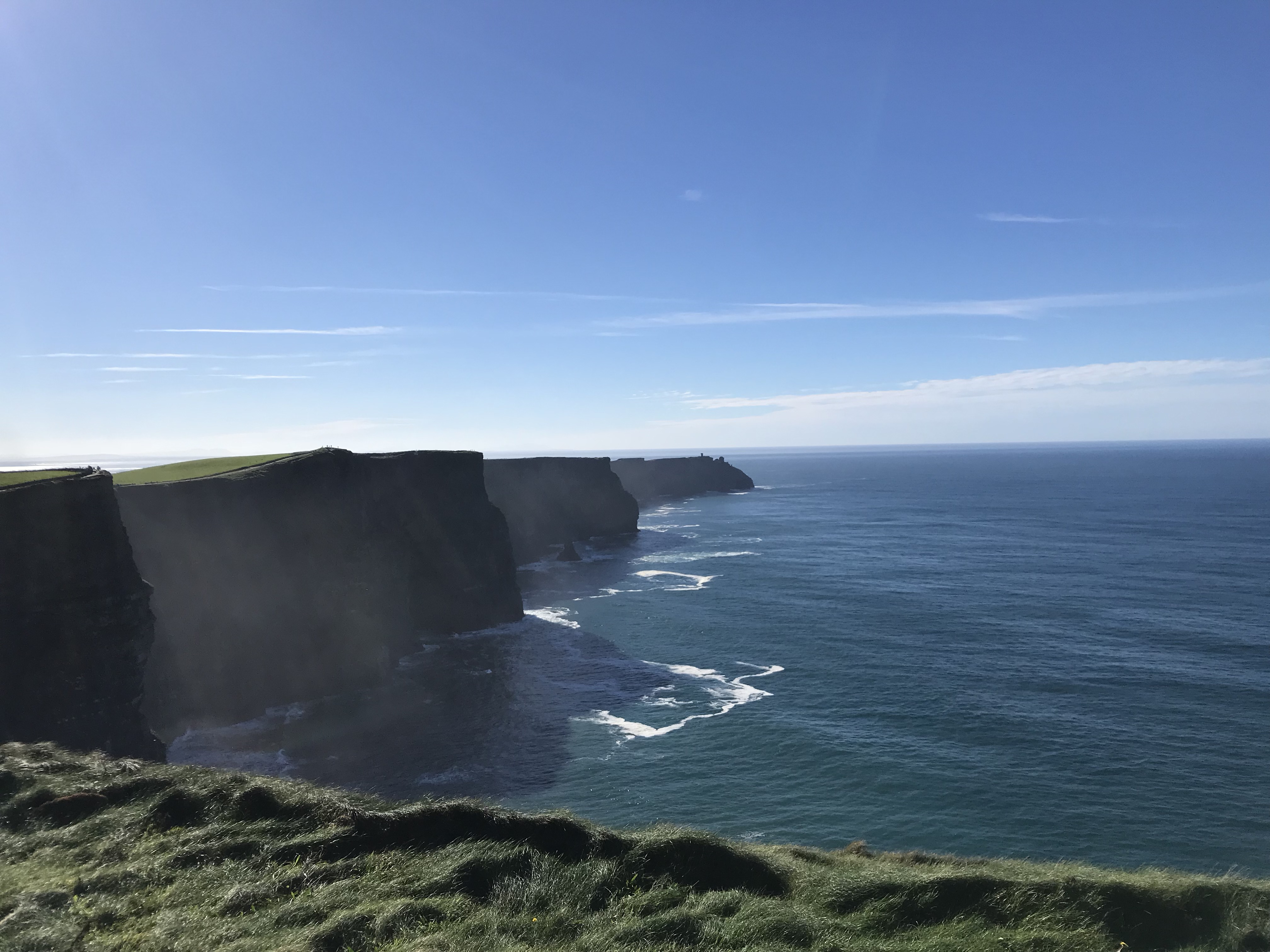
Cliffs of Moher, Ireland

== See also ==
- Wild Atlantic Way, an official tourism route, on which the cliffs form a "signature point"
- Slieve League, another Irish mountain with sea-cliffs
- Croaghaun, another Irish mountain with sea-cliffs
- Surfing in Ireland, Aileens is a world-renowned Big Wave
- List of tourist attractions in Ireland
