= Killilagh =

Civil parish in County Clare, Ireland

Killilagh Cill Aidhleach
- Civil parish
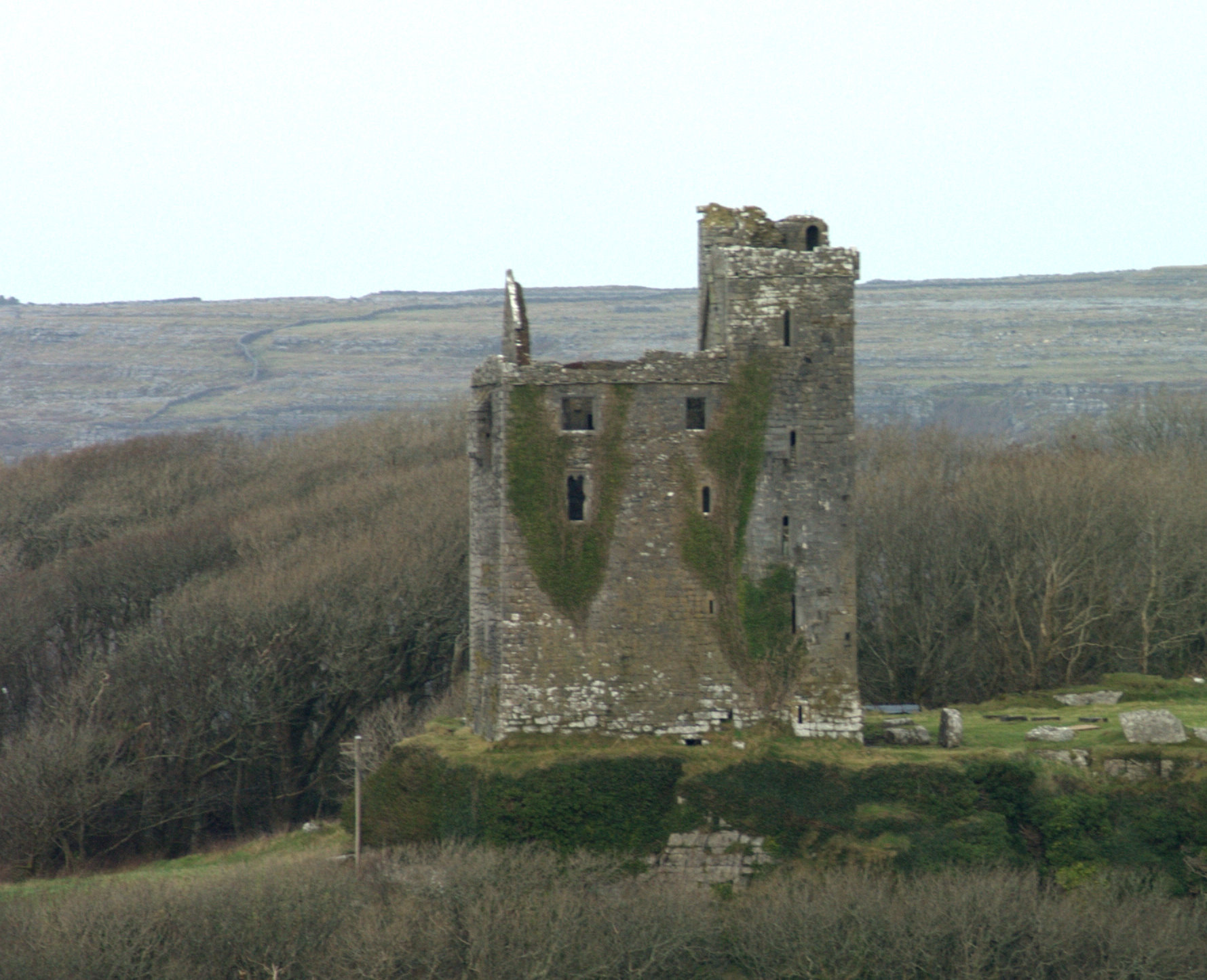
- Ballinalacken Castle

- Location within Ireland
- Coordinates: 53°02′44″N 9°20′44″W
- Country: Ireland
- Province: Munster
- County: County Clare
- Time zone: UTC+0 (WET)
  - Summer (DST): UTC-1 (IST (WEST))

Killilagh or Killeilagh (Irish: Cill Aidhleach) is a civil parish in County Clare, Ireland. It contains the village of Doolin.

== Location ==
The parish lies in the northwest corner of the Barony of Corcomroe. It is 5.5 by 4 miles (8.9 by 6.4 km) and covers 12,357 acres (5,001 ha). It lies along the South Sound, opposite the Aran Islands. The land is mountainous and broken. The small bay of Doolin lies at the boundary between the schistose rocks that form the cliffs stretching southward to the Shannon Estuary and the limestone of the Barony of Burren. Doolin Castle was located near the bay, north of Fisherstreet.

The parish is 6.75 miles (10.86 km) north of Ennistymon.

== Civil and Catholic parish ==
In 1845 the parish was united with Clooney to form one Catholic parish. Today it is part of the Catholic parish of Lisdoonvarna and Kilshanny in the Diocese of Galway, Kilmacduagh and Kilfenora. Parish churches are Corpus Christi in Lisdoonvarna, Holy Rosary in Doolin, Our Lady of Lourdes in Toovahera and Saint Augustine in Kilshanny.

== Demographics ==
The population in 1841 was 3,904 in 644 houses. Of these, 3,551 in 586 houses lived in rural districts.

== History ==
Quarrying was once an important industry in the parish and in Kilmacrehy to the south. More than 500 men used to work for nine companies at four major quarries: Doonagore, Caherbana, Lough and Moher. The main shipping port was Liscannor. Flag stone from this area was used in English city pavements, the floor of the Royal Mint and for building the Redemptorist Church in Belfast. In 1904/5 a narrow gauge railway was operated by Watson's quarry, running for 3.5 miles.

In the 1930s and 1940s, Judge Comyn operated an open-cast phosphate mine near Doolin. Around 85,000 tons were mined in total until, during World War II, the government compulsorily acquired them. The owner sued, arguing insufficient compensation. After a total of 41 days in court in 1949/50, the court awarded him in excess of £20,000.

== Antiquities ==
=== Prehistoric through early medieval ===
The parish contains remains of many old forts or settlements surrounded by embankments. A particularly large group of such remains, along with associated enclosures and stone walls are known as the "Glasha group", after the townlands north of Doolin in which they are located. A cromlech stands on the townland of Cahermacrusheen. At Teergonean townland, there is a court cairn, one of several such structures in the Burren. Most examples of this type of structure are found in the north of Ireland, however. Although the history and migration patterns of the people who built these tombs are still the subject of debate, the tomb likely dates to the period 3500 to 3200 BC. There is also uncertainty over the origin of the townland's name. T. J. Westropp suggested a relationship to the three ruined cashels (or ringforts) in the area. He also gave possible variants as: Tregownine, Tirgouinene and Tirgearnine. Frost translated Tír gan Éan as "the birdless district".

Another fort is located at Cnoc na Stúlaire in Doolin townland. It consists of a circular ditch and embankment. Inside are two standing stones, one of which has fallen. However, absent excavations it is uncertain whether the stones are contemporaneous with the surrounding earthen structure or were added later. Claims that one of the stones features Ogham writing have been discounted.

Other antiquities include several ring cairns, likely from the Iron Age, around Doolin. One of them was reportedly the site where in 1588 170 survivors of an Armada wreck were hanged.

Where the Aille river flows into the Atlantic, southeast of Doolin Harbour, lies the so-called "Doolin axe factory". At this site, stone tools (axes, scrapers) were manufactured. The findings' origins likely are Neolithic (there is a tomb from that period at Teergonean, see above) or even Mesolithic, as those earlier hunter-gatherer groups often used river mouths as locations for their base camps.

=== Churches ===
The origins of the parish name are unknown. There is no recorded saint with a name like Oighleach. The only holy well was one at Toomullin dedicated to Saint Breccan of Arran, a disciple of St Patrick. In 1897 the church of Killilagh was well preserved. In addition to Toomullin Church, there was another ancient church in ruins at Oughtdarra.

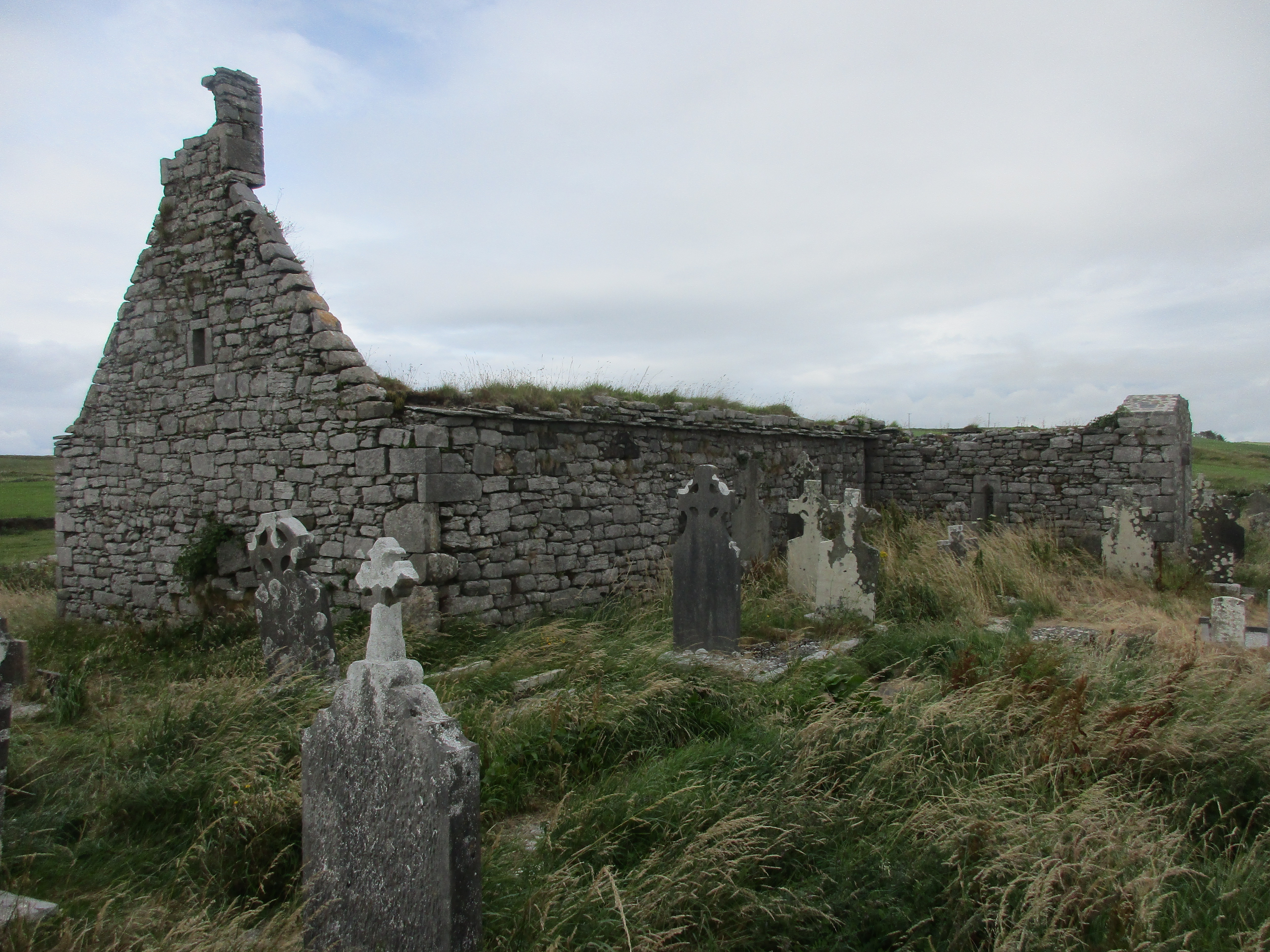
Ruins of Killilagh Church

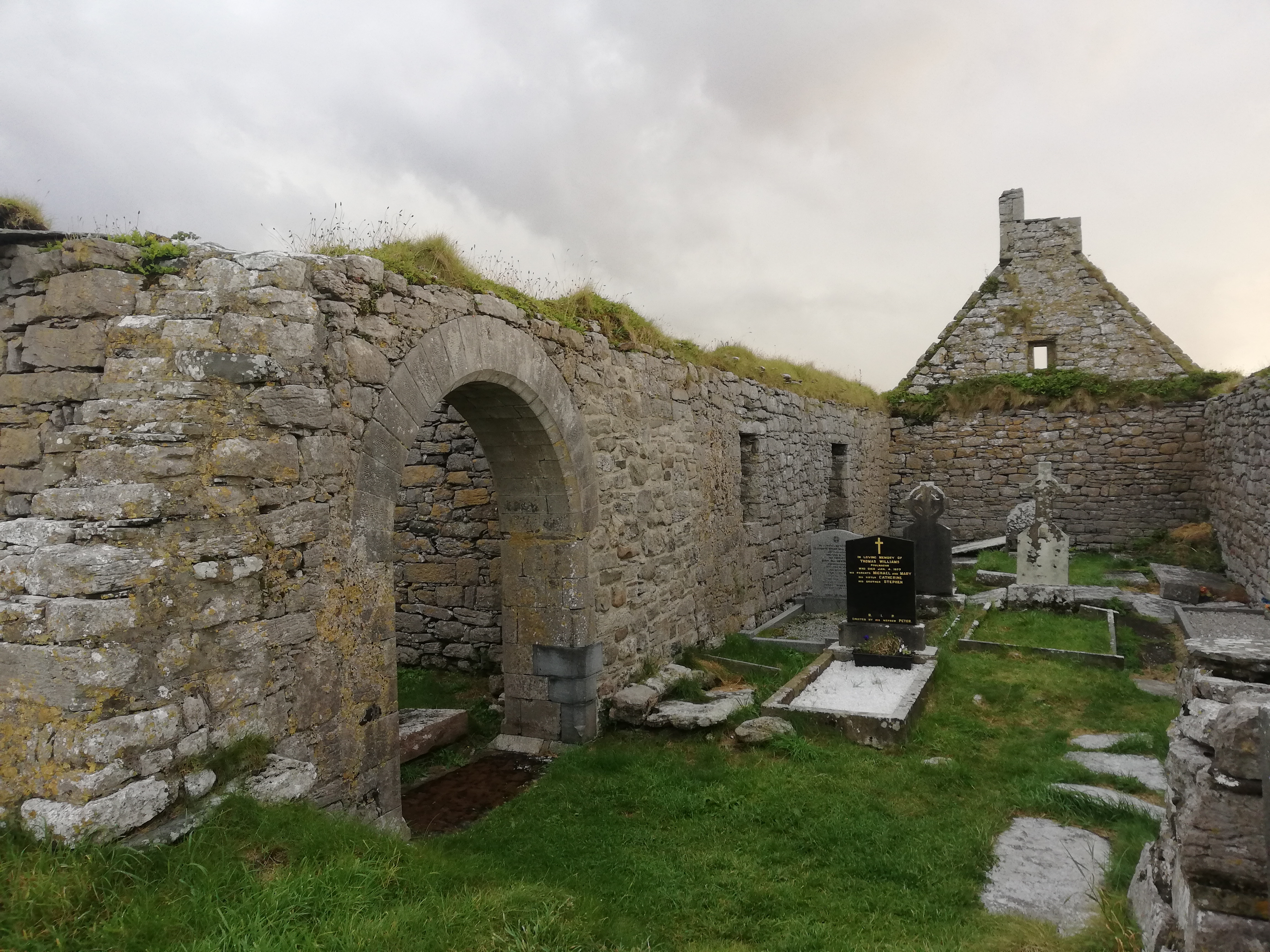
Interior of Killilagh church, with rounded arch leading to side chapel.

Killilagh Church is a large parish church with a side chapel, substantially rebuilt around the 15th century. The main wing is almost 20 meters long. Killilagh was one of the wealthiest and most populous parishes in Kilfenora diocese. Not much of the original pre-14th century church remains today. The church has been the subject of much damage from the weather. In 2013 restoration work to the side chapel by Doolin Heritage and Conservation Builder Tom Howard of Kilnaboy under the guidance of Dick Cronin and with the permission of the National Monuments, further work is planned. A storm in 1903 blew over the eastern gable wall. A carved stone head from the church is now at the Burren Centre at Kilfenora, after it was stolen in 1971 and later recovered. A mausoleum to the south of the church was intended as the Macnamara family vault, but was not used.

Toomullin Church was in use at the same time as Killilagh Church and was reportedly founded by St Breccan. The church was originally much smaller than it is today. If it was founded by St Breccan, it must have initially been a wooden structure. The church is mentioned in taxation lists in the early 14th century, but at the time was one of the poorest in the Diocese of Kilfenora. The vicinity to Killilagh, the richest church in the Diocese, makes it unlikely that it was a parish church. Toomullin likely served as a family chapel to the MacClancy family of nearby Toomullin Castle (see below). In 1941, a bronze brooch from around 200 to 300 AD was discovered by workers at Judge Comyn Phosphate digging a new watercourse, the hoard also included a stone ring, two tusks and skull now lost. Today, much of the south wall of the church has collapsed, but several 15th-century features can still be identified. The graveyard, the tomb of Conogher MacClancy and the holy well noted by Frost in 1897 are no longer extant.

=== Castles ===
The 1580 inventory of Thomond castles lists five in the parish. Doonagore Castle belonged to Sir Daniel O'Brien of Dough of the powerful O'Brien family

Knockfin, Doonmacfelim and Ballinalacken were owned by Teigue MacMurrogh O'Brien. Doonmacfelim, close to Fisherstreet, is a tower house from the late 15th or early 16th century. After the Cromwellian settlement it passed to one John Fitzgerald.

Toomullin Castle was the property of Conogher (or Conor) MacClancy (or sometimes McClancy, MacGlanchy) and Hugh MacClancy in the middle of the 15th century. Hugh's direct descendant, Boetius Clancy (died April 1598), High Sheriff of Clare, owned Knockfin Castle in 1580. He hanged the survivors of the September 1588 Spanish Armada wreck and had a table made from some of the ship's timber. It was later given to the owners of Leamaneh Castle, Conor O'Brien and Máire ní Mahon. Today, it is on display in Bunratty Castle. The MacClancy family were the brehons (or hereditary lawyers) of the Earls of Thomond. Their famous law school was at the site now occupied by the Church of the Holy Rosary (Roman Catholic, c. 1830) at the intersection in Knockfin, about a mile north of Doolin.

Ballinalacken Castle stands on a rocky eminence near the sea. Given the prominent position, it is likely that the location was used for previous fortifications, but no traces of them are visible today. The name probably derives from Baile na leachan (town of the flagstones/tombstones/stones) or Beal Áth na Leacha (ford-mouth of the flagstones). In the late 14th century, Lochlan MacCon O'Connor reportedly built a fortress at the site. The current tower house resembles Leamaneh Castle in that it was constructed over a prolonged period. The oldest part is the tall eastern tower, likely built in the 15th century.

Doolin House, or Doolin Castle, was a property of the MacNamaras of Ennistymon. After likely having served as their main residence in the 19th century, by the early 20th century it was a summer home. The poet Francis MacNamara used it this way in the 1910s. His daughter Nicolette Macnamara later described life there in detail in her autobiographical book Two Flamboyant Fathers. Among Francis' regular guests at the house were writer George Bernard Shaw and painter Augustus John. In the 1920s the house was destroyed by fire. Subsequently, the stones were carried away by locals as construction material and the Land Commission redistributed the land.

== Townlands ==
Townlands are Ardeamush, Aughavinna, Aughiska Beg, Aughiska More, Ballaghaline, Ballycahan, Ballycullaun, Ballynalackan, Ballynahown, Ballyryan, Ballysallagh, Ballyvara, Ballyvoe, Boherboy, Caherkinallia, Cahermacrusheen, Cahermaclanchy, Carnaun (spelled Carnane in the 1901 Census), Carrownycleary, Cloghaun, Coogyulla, Craggycorradan East, Craggycorradan West, Cronagort East, Cronagort West, Doolin, Doonmacfelim, Doonnagore, Glasha Beg, Glasha More, Gortaclob, Island, Killilagh, Knockacarn, Knockaguilla, Knocknaranhy, Laghtmurreda, Luogh North, Luogh South, Lurraga, Oughtdarra, Pouliskaboy, Poulnagun, Teergonean, Toomullin and Toornahooan.

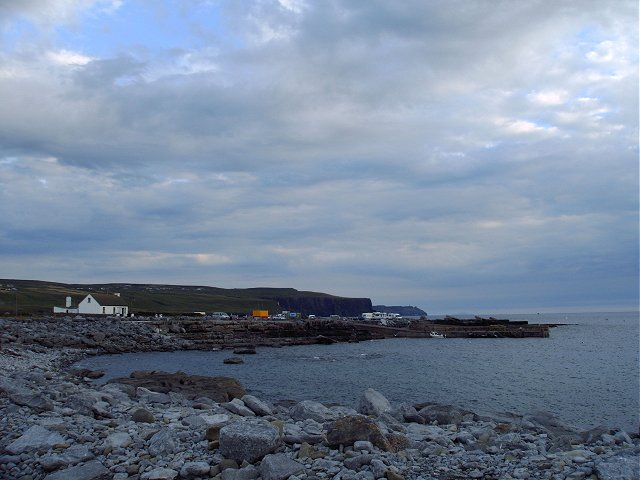
Evening at Doolin harbour

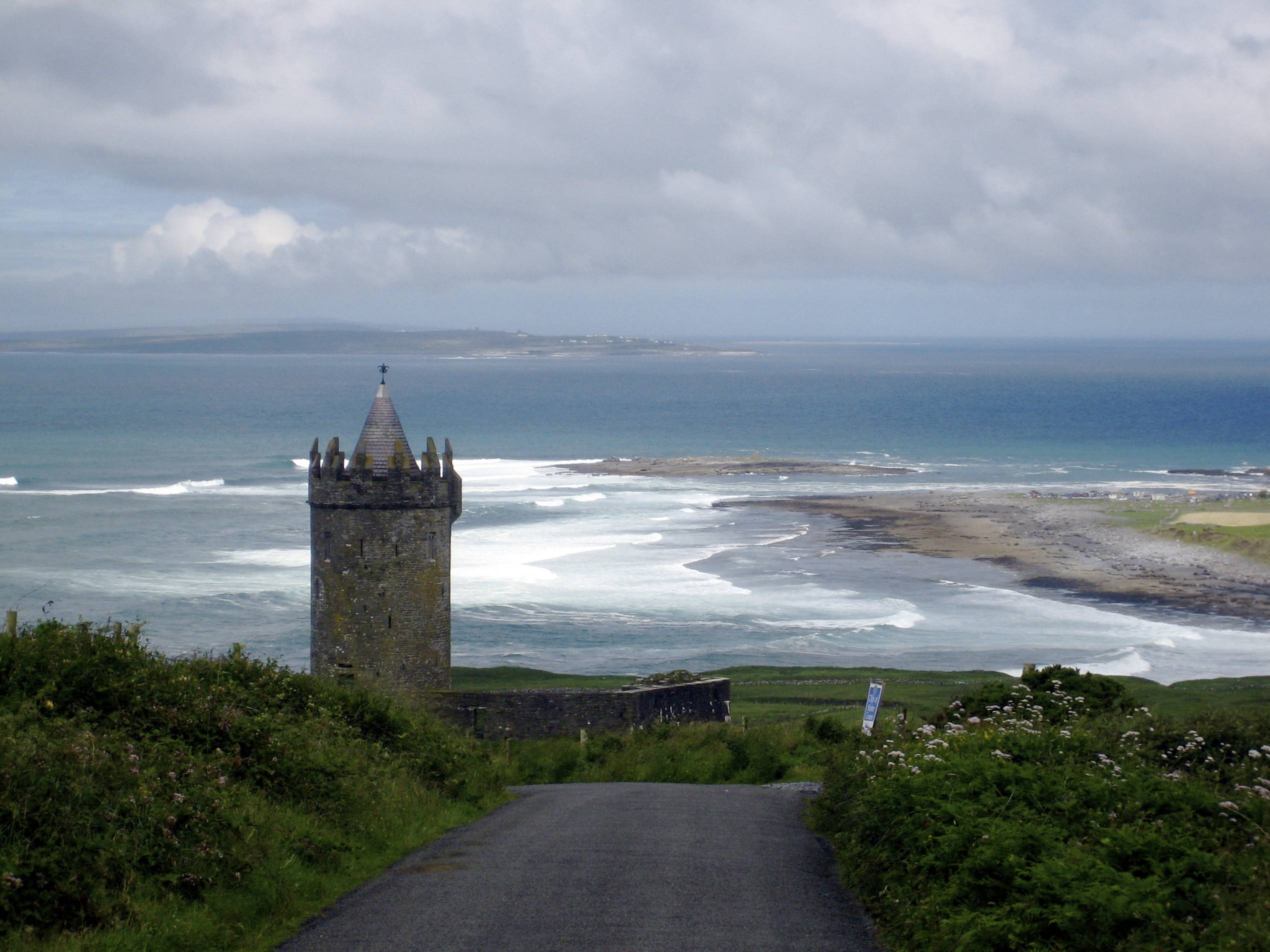
Doonagore Castle and the Aran Islands

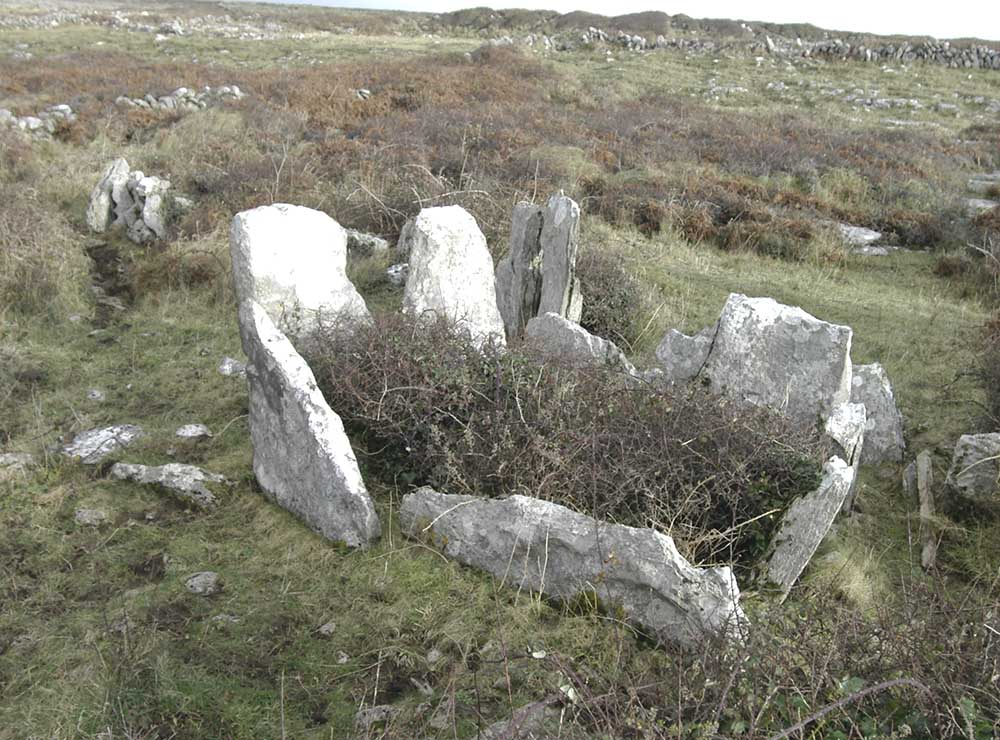
Chamber of the court-cairn at Teergonean
