= Packie Russell =

Patrick Russell
- Born: 1920
- Origin: County Clare, Ireland
- Died: 1977 (aged 56–57)
- Genres: Traditional Irish
- Instrument(s): concertina, storyteller

Patrick "Pakie" or "Packie" Russell (1920 in Doonagore, Doolin – 4 September 1977) was a stonecutter and a well known Irish traditional concertina player and storyteller out of Doolin, County Clare, Ireland. He was one of the three Russell brothers to earn fame as musician, together with his brothers Micho and Gussie.

Packie learned to play music on a very young age, learning most of his skills from his mother and from his neighbour Patrick Flanagan, both gifted concertina players.

Packie and his brothers first got attention outside Doolin due to the work of the Irish Folklore Commission. In the late 1930s Seamus O' Duillearga was active in County Clare and recorded stories and music, including music of the Russell brothers. Later recordings by others also brought them a wider public.

== Personal ==
He was born as one of five children of Austin Russell and Annie Moloney. He had two brothers and two sisters.

Packie Russells main occupation was as stone cutter in the quarry at Doonagore. Besides being a gifted musician, he was also a gifted storyteller.

While his brother Micho toured around the world, Packie (and Gussie) stayed at home in Doolin, playing most of his time in Gus O'Connor's Pub in Doolin. Still his death in 1977 made national headlines and national TV.

‘I am only an ignorant countryman living on the edge of the Cliffs of Moher, in the county of Clare, on the western coast of Ireland.’

== Recordings ==
- The Russell Family of Doolin, Co. Clare; Micho, Packie and Gussie Russell. Recorded by John Tams and Neil Wayne in O'Connor's Bar, Doolin January 1974. Published in 1975 by Topic Records.
- Keepers of Tradition Concertina players of County Clare
