= Ballaghline =

Townland in County Clare, Ireland

Coordinates: 53°0′42″N 9°23′53″W

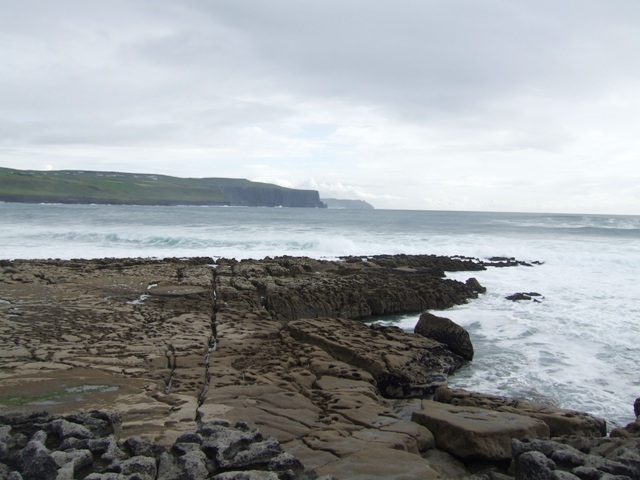
Ballaghaline Point

Ballaghline (Irish: Béal Átha Laighean) is a small townland on the western seaboard of County Clare, Ireland. It is on the outskirts of Doolin, and Doolin's pitch and putt course is in the townland.

Ballaghaline townland is approximately 0.8 square kilometres (0.3 sq mi) in area and lies within the civil parish of Killilagh. As of the 2011 census, it had a population of 27 people in 7 occupied houses.
