= Ballinalacken Castle =

- Baile na leachan
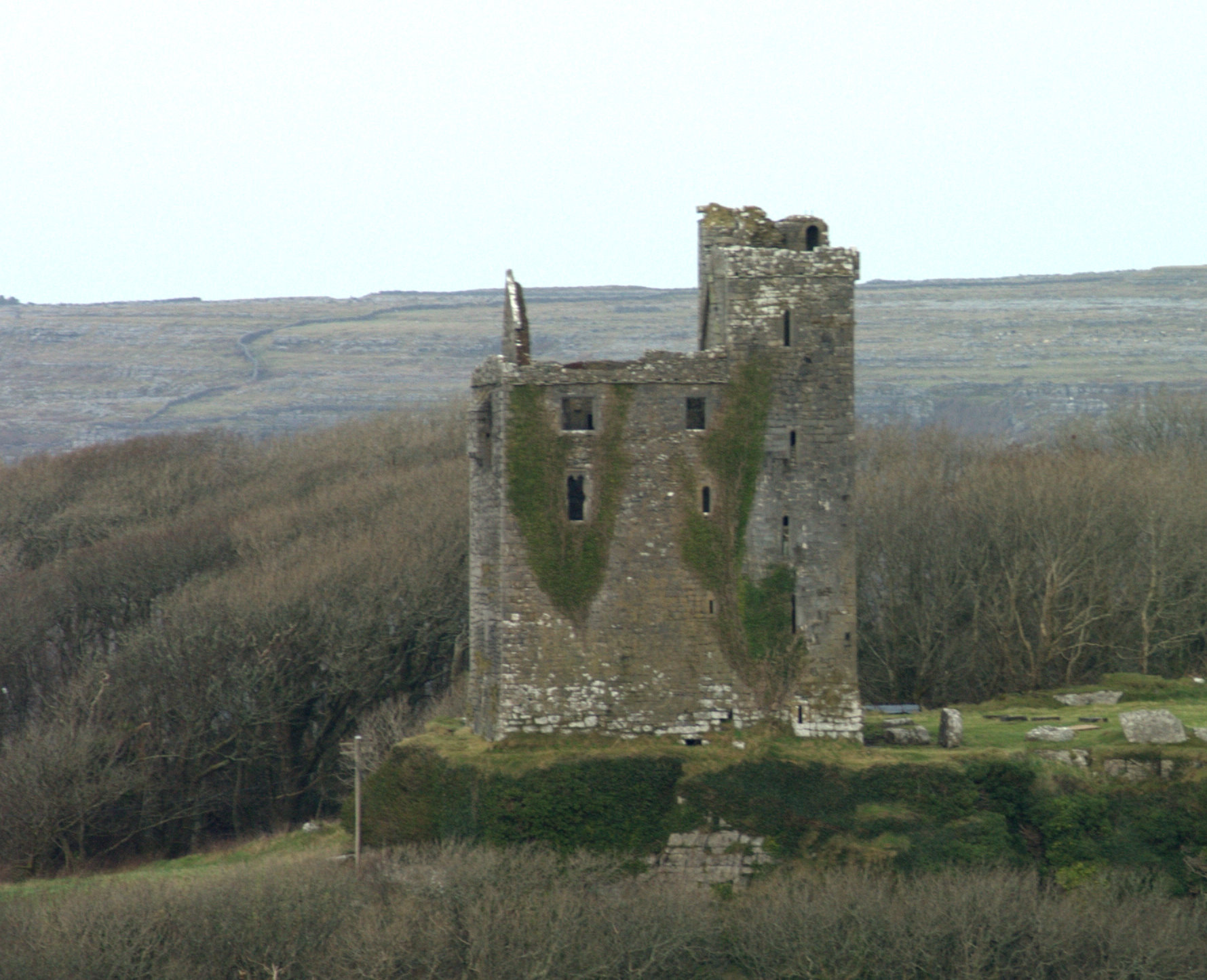
- Ballinalacken Castle in 2006

- Location within Ireland

General information
- Status: ruin
- Type: tower house
- Location: Killilagh parish, Ireland
- Coordinates: 53°02′46″N 9°20′14″W

Ballinalacken Castle is a two-stage tower house located in Killilagh parish of County Clare, Ireland. It is of uncertain date but most likely was built in the 15th or early 16th century.

== Name ==
The name probably derives from Baile na leachan (town of the flagstones/tombstones/stones) or Beal Áth na Leacha (ford-mouth of the flagstones).

== Location ==
It is located in the region known as the Burren on a limestone outcrop overlooking the roads from Lisdoonvarna to Fanore and Doolin. Below the castle lies the intersection of R477 and R479 roads.

== History ==
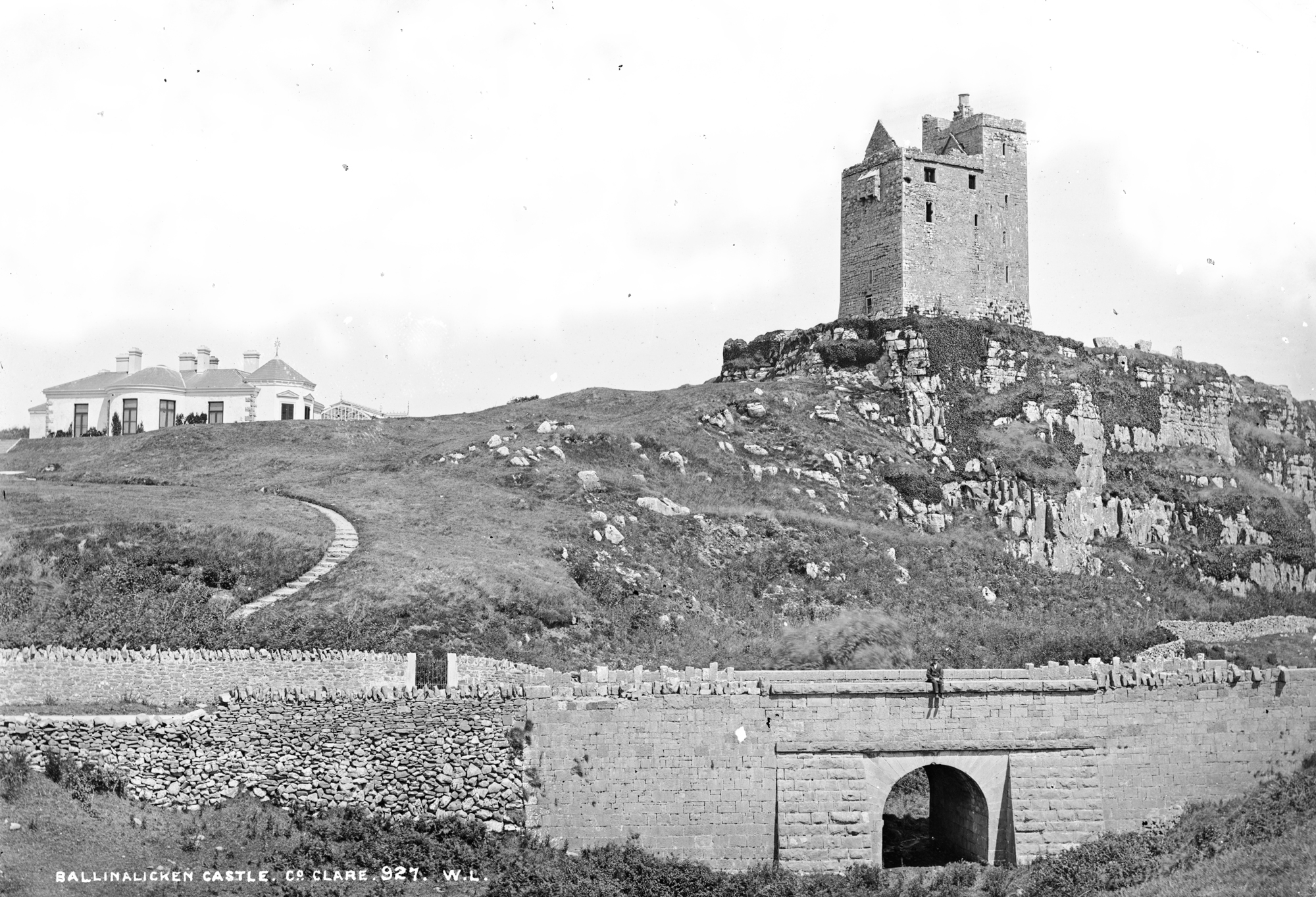
Ballinalacken Castle in the late 19th century, with the residence and later castle hotel on the left

Given the prominent position, it is likely that the location was used for previous fortifications, but no traces of such are visible today. In the late 14th century, Lochlan MacCon O'Connor reportedly built a fortress at the site.

The current tower house resembles Leamaneh Castle in that it was constructed over a prolonged period. The oldest part is the tall eastern tower, likely built in the 15th century. In 1564 the O'Connors lost their territory and in 1584/5 the castle was formally ceded to Sir Turlough O'Brien. Following the 1641 rebellion and subsequent Cromwellian reorganization, Turlough's son Daniel petitioned the English Commission in 1654 to save the house from demolition. Either he or his son, Teigue, eventually built the expansion at Ballinalacken. Teigue's son in turn, Donough, styled himself "of Ballyneleackan". The house remained in the possession of the Ennistymon O'Briens until the middle of the 18th century, when it passed to a different branch of the family. The Ballinalacken O'Briens trace their descent from Turlough Don who died in 1528, and also from the Ennistymon branch of the O'Briens, which was founded by Sir Donald O'Brien of Dough Castle (Lahinch) who died in 1579. In 1641-2 it was held by Daniel O'Brien of Dough and in 1654 a Cromwellian officer ordered the castles of Dough and Ballinalacken to be preserved from the dismantling of fortifications. In the 1667 Act of Settlement a Captain Hamilton became owner, but the O'Briens regained possession. The O'Briens were one of the most powerful families in Ireland at the time and built several castles - of which Ballinalacken is one. In 1837 its owner was planning to repair it.

The bow fronted bungalow-type Ballinalacken Castle Hotel was built in the 1840s as the home of Lord O'Brien. It likely was built by John O'Brien MP (died 1855), eldest son of James and Margaret O'Brien. Being widowed in 1806, Margaret married Cornelius O'Brien. John was the father of Peter O'Brien. The house features a marble fireplace carved from a single slab and a circular, centre-roof window. There are also some original stained-glass windows and an O'Brien stone crest. The residence became a guest house in 1938.

== Description ==
The castle is surrounded by a bawn, entered through a corbelled, machicolated gate. The tower house itself seems to have been constructed in two sections, later connected. The narrower and one storey taller eastern wing has the doorway with a top machicolation. A porter's lodge faces the circular stairs from which three floors of bedrooms are accessed, lit by small windows. The top floor gives access to a wall walk. The main wing features a finely carved Tudor chimney (dated 1641). Machicolations in this wing contain several musket holes.
