= R478 road (Ireland) =

Road in Ireland

R478 road
- Bóthar R478
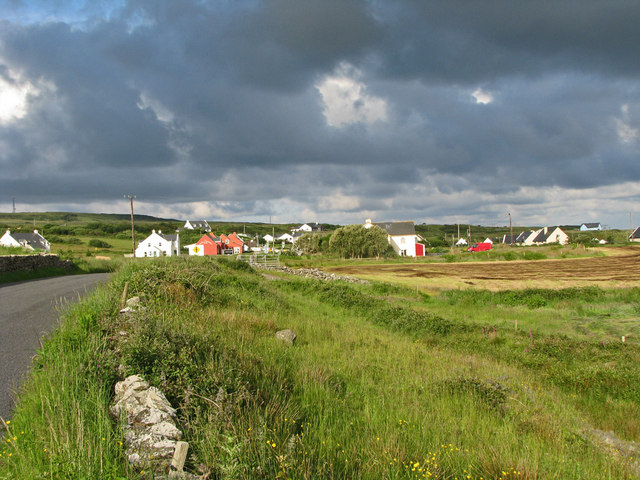
- R478 near Doolin Holiday Village

Route information
- Length: 21.8 km (13.5 mi)

Major junctions
- From: R476 at Gowlaun Bridge, County Clare
- N67 at Aughiska Beg; R479 at Coogyulla
- To: N67 at Ennistimon Road, Lahinch

Location
- Country: Ireland

Highway system
- Roads in Ireland; Motorways; Primary; Secondary; Regional
← R477	→ R479

The R478 road is a regional road in Ireland. It is a loop road from the N67 in County Clare. Part of the road is on the Wild Atlantic Way. The road passes along, and is the only road access to, the Cliffs of Moher.

The R478 travels west from the R476 near Lisdoonvarna. After passing the Cliffs of Moher and Liscannor, the road rejoins the N67 in Lahinch. The R478 is 21.8 km (13.5 mi) long.
