= Spectacle Bridge =

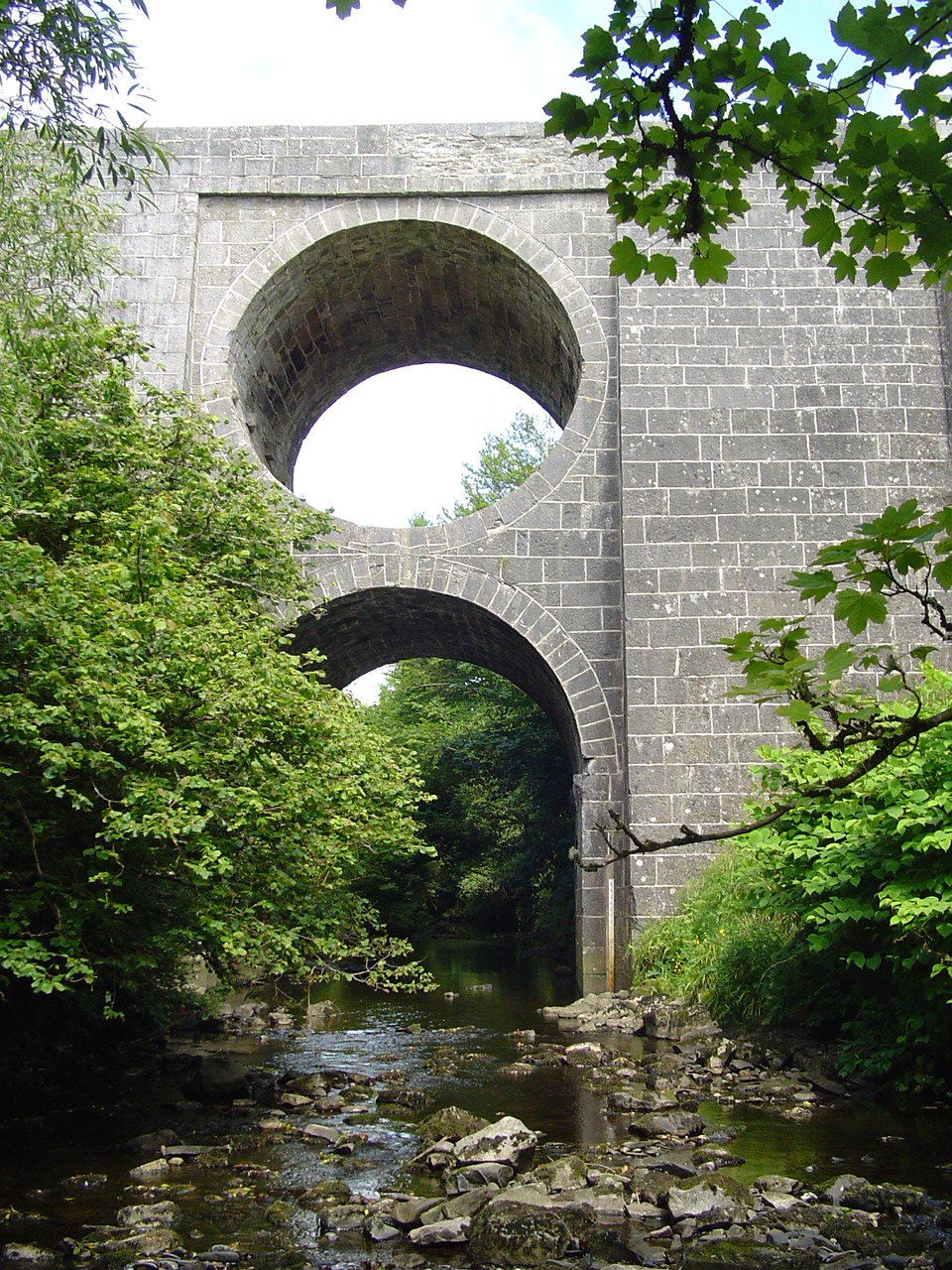
- Coordinates: 53.025°N 9.30706°W
- Carries: N67
- Crosses: Aille River
- Locale: County Clare

Characteristics
- Design: Arch bridge
- Material: Stone
- No. of spans: One

History
- Designer: John Hill
- Opened: May 1816

The Spectacle Bridge is a bridge built in May 1816 over the Aille River in County Clare, Ireland.

== History ==
The Spectacle Bridge was designed by County Clare's county engineer, John Hill. It spans the Aille River gorge on the road between Lisdoonvarna and Ennistymon on the N67. The gorge is up to 25 metres deep at points, and a solid bridge would have been too heavy. Hill then designed a tunnel running through the centre to make the structure lighter. This design resulted in the name, the Spectacle Bridge. It is a single arch with cut-stone coping and voussoirs, and splayed piers.

The bridge was renovated in 2001.
