= R459 road (Ireland) =

Road in Ireland

Coordinates: 53.013450°N 9.394305°W

R459 road
- Bóthar R459
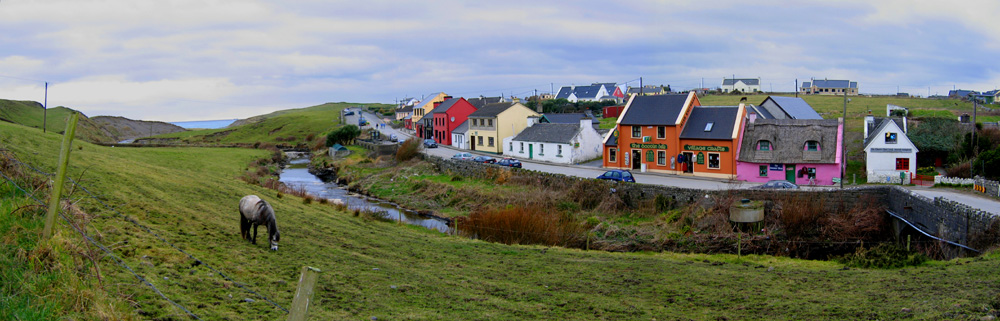
- Panorama of Fisher Street, part of the R459.

Route information
- Length: 2.2 km (1.4 mi)

Major junctions
- From: Doolin Pier
- Crosses Aille River
- To: R479 Doolin

Location
- Country: Ireland

Highway system
- Roads in Ireland; Motorways; Primary; Secondary; Regional

The R459 road is a regional road in Ireland, located in Doolin, County Clare.
