= R477 road (Ireland) =

Regional road in Ireland

Coordinates: 53.096405°N 9.304141°W

R477 road
- Bóthar R477
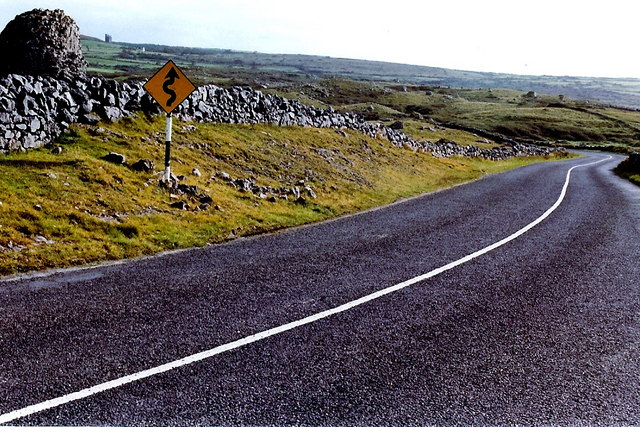
- The R477 southwest of Black Head.

Route information
- Length: 28.7 km (17.8 mi)

Major junctions
- From: N67 Ballyvaughan
- Passes through Murroogh; Crosses Caher River; Passes through Fanore; R479 Ballinalacken Castle
- To: N67 Rooska (west of Lisdoonvarna)

Location
- Country: Ireland

Highway system
- Roads in Ireland; Motorways; Primary; Secondary; Regional

The R477 road is a regional road in Ireland, located in coastal County Clare. It is a notable scenic route.
