= Lisdoonvarna Music Festival =

Irish music festival

- Programme for 1980
- Genre: Irish traditional music; Folk music; various
- Dates: July
- Locations: Doolin, County Clare, Ireland
- Years active: 1978–1983
- Founders: Jim Shannon, Paddy Doherty
- Capacity: 70,000
- Organiser: Zenith Productions

Lisdoonvarna was a three-day Irish music festival held each year from 1978 to 1983. Conceived as an Irish folk and traditional music festival, it expanded to include other genres and international artists. The festival was compared to an Irish version of Woodstock or Glastonbury. Though successful, violence at the 1983 event and the unrelated drowning deaths of eight festival goers that year led to the event being cancelled after 1983. Attempts were made to revive the festival in 2003 and 2016.

== History ==
After considering the idea since 1975, festival creator Jim Shannon made concrete plans in a bar in June 1977 for a festival to be held the following year. Participants would be predominantly Irish acts as the violence of The Troubles discouraged international artists from playing in Ireland.

=== Early editions ===
The inaugural event was held from 14 to 16 July 1978 and included Christy Moore, The Chieftains, De Dannan and The Fureys. Moore wrote a song to commemorate his appearance which was added to The Penguin Book of Irish Poetry in 2010. The second festival was held from 13 to 15 July 1979 and was headlined by Loudon Wainwright III. Others who performed included Ralph McTell, The Chieftains, De Dannan, The Fureys and Stockton's Wing. The third festival took place from 11 to 13 July 1980 and participating artists included Emmylou Harris, Paul Brady, Clannad and The Chieftains

The fourth festival was held from 10 to 12 July 1981 and was headlined by Chris de Burgh, with support artists including Lindisfarne, The Beat, Paul Brady, Planxty and De Dannan. British reggae band Steel Pulse played and commented on the recent Brixton riots. The 1982 festival was headlined by Jackson Browne, with other artists including UB40, Wishbone Ash, The Chieftains, Stockton's Wing and The Atrix. For the first time, a festival village was added. Festival attendance fell relative to the previous year.

=== 1983 ===
The 1983 festival was cut from three days to two and was moved two weeks later to 30–31 July to take advantage of the August Holiday. It was headlined by Rory Gallagher and Van Morrison, while Peter Green, Christy Moore, Amazulu, Dennis Bovell, Climax Blues Band, John Martyn, Moving Hearts and Stockton's Wing also played. Attendance was estimated at 40,000. Attendees included American singer-songwriter Rickie Lee Jones, who recounted meeting Van Morrison in her memoir.

After over a thousand people without tickets had breached the fence on the first day, organisers recruited members of a Hells Angels motorcycle group to bolster security. A further breach on the second day led to running battles between festival goers and the Hells Angels, which resulted in injuries, motorcycles being vandalised and tents burned. In a separate incident, eight festival goers disregarded warning notices and swam out to a sandbank. The victims, all men aged 17 to 25, were washed out to sea and drowned, while several others had to be rescued by emergency services.

The 1983 events led to a significant backlash from the local community in Lisdoonvarna who, at a public meeting, expressed concerns about vandalism, public intoxication and drug use by festival goers and voted to oppose the festival occurring again in the area. The 1983 festival had resulted in a financial loss and proved to be the last of the festival's original run.

== Revival attempts ==
A festival was scheduled for 28 June 2003 as a one-day event across two stages and was to have been headlined by Christy Moore, while The Frames, Suzanne Vega, Mundy, Damien Dempsey and Luka Bloom were also set to perform. The organisers planned to hold the revival at the original site but were denied a licence by Clare County Council, who cited concerns about noise pollution and inadequate infrastructure around the festival site for their decision. The event was relocated to Dublin's RDS Arena and held on 30 August 2003 with an approximate attendance of 24,000. Josh Ritter was the only non-Irish artist to perform. The event was criticised for its long queues. A further revival attempt was made in 2016 when a one-off "Lisdoonvarna Folk festival" was held as a two-day event near to the original site.
