= Homestead Cottage =

Restaurant in County Clare, Ireland

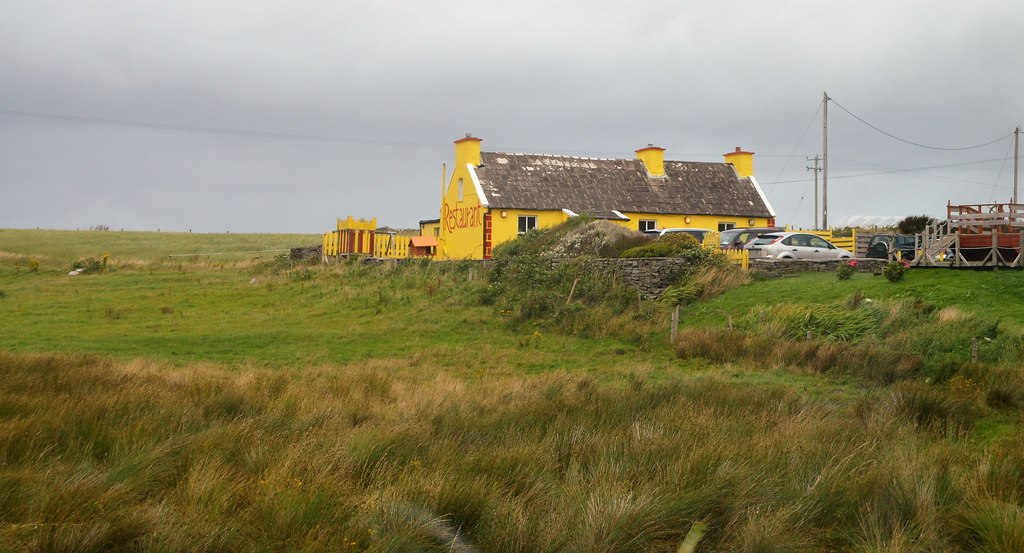
- The building that houses Homestead Cottage (Image is from 2018, when a different restaurant, Stonecutter's Kitchen, occupied the site.)

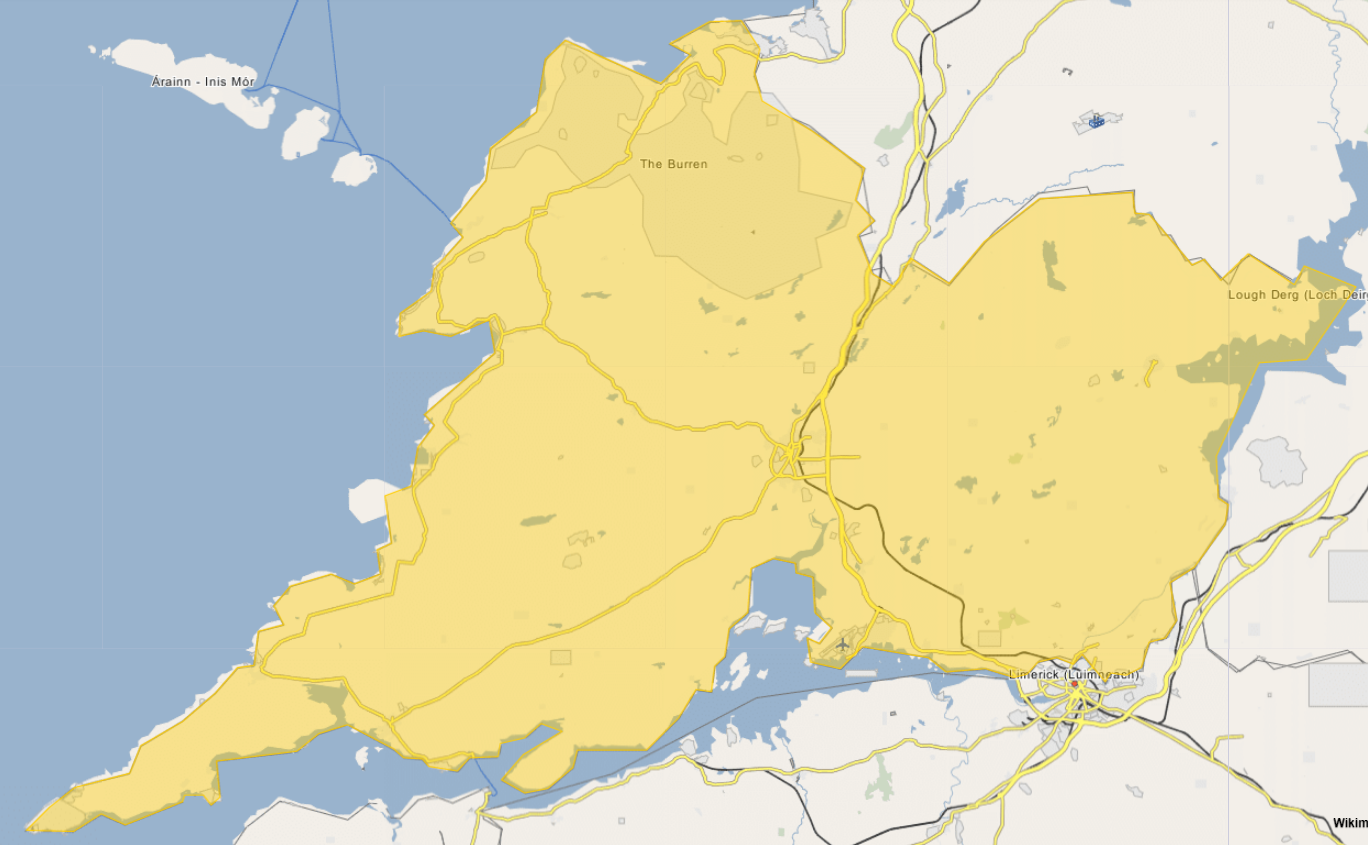
- Location within County Clare

Restaurant information
- Established: June 2023
- Owners: Robbie and Sophie McCauley
- Head chef: Robbie McCauley
- Food type: Irish cuisine
- Rating: Michelin Guide
- Location: Luogh North, Doolin, County Clare, V95 KH30, Ireland
- Coordinates: 52°59′34″N 9°24′11″W
- Seating capacity: 35
- Reservations: Yes
- Website: homesteadcottagedoolin.com

Homestead Cottage is a restaurant in Doolin, Ireland. It is owned by Robbie and Sophie McCauley.

== History ==
Homestead Cottage opened in late June 2023. Head chef Robbie McCauley is from Edinburgh and his wife Sophie is from Burgundy; Robbie was nine years at Gregan's Castle, Ballyvaughan. It is based in a 19th-century cottage and serves locally sourced dishes.

It received a Michelin star for the first time in 2023.

== Awards ==
- Michelin star: 2023

== See also ==
- List of Michelin starred restaurants in Ireland
