= Gussie Russell =

Austin (Gussie) Russell
- Born: 1917
- Origin: County Clare, Ireland
- Died: 2004 (aged 86–87)
- Genres: Traditional Irish
- Instrument(s): flute, whistle

Austin (Gussie) Russell (1917, Doonagore, Doolin – 18 May 2004, Ennistymon Hospital) was a stonecutter and a well known Irish traditional flute and whistle player out of Doolin, County Clare, Ireland. He was one of the three Russell brothers to earn fame as a musician, together with his brothers Micho and Packie.

Gussie learned to play music at a very young age, learning most of his skills from his neighbour Patrick Flanagan, a concertina player. He and Micho got their first concert flutes from their uncle John Moloney in 1932, when he returned from the United States.

Gussie and his brothers first got attention outside Doolin due to the work of the Irish Folklore Commission. In the late 1930s Seamus O'Duillearga was active in County Clare and recorded stories and music, including music of the Russell brothers. Later recordings by others also brought them a wider public.

== Personal ==
He was born as one of five children of Austin Russell and Annie Moloney. He had two brothers and two sisters.

Gussie Russell's main occupation was as stone cutter in the quarry at Doonagore. Besides being a gifted musician, he was also a gifted tradesman and mechanic.

== Recordings ==
=== With brothers ===
- The Russell Family of Doolin, Co. Clare; Micho, Packie and Gussie Russell. Recorded by John Tams and Neil Wayne in O'Connor's Bar, Doolin January 1974. Published in 1975 by Topic Records.

=== Anthologies ===
- Farewell to Lissycasey: The Traditional Music of County Clare; 1995
- Treasure Of My Heart: Classic, 1998
