= Doonagore Castle =

Tower house in County Clare, Ireland

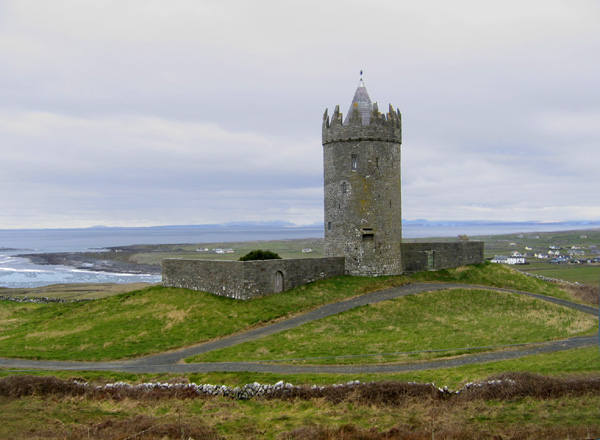
- Doonagore Castle, overlooking Doolin and the Atlantic Ocean

- Location within Ireland

General information
- Location: Doolin, County Clare, Ireland
- Coordinates: 53.00327°N 9.38713°W
- Completed: 16th century

Doonagore Castle is a round 16th-century tower house with a small walled enclosure located about 1 km south of the coastal village of Doolin in County Clare, Ireland. Its name may be derived from Dún na Gabhair, meaning "the fort of the rounded hills" or the "fort of the goats". Doonagore Castle is at present a private holiday home, inaccessible to the public.

Doonagore Castle sits on a hill overlooking Doolin Point and, along with a nearby higher radio mast, is used as a navigational point by boats approaching Doolin Pier. It is located in the townland of Doonagore, parish of Killilagh, County Clare. It is sometimes considered to be located in the area known as the Burren.[1]:99

== History ==
A castle was built on (or near) the site of an even earlier ringfort by Tadhg (Teigue) MacTurlough MacCon O'Connor some time during the 14th century.

The current structure likely dates from the mid-16th century. Unlike most tower houses in the region, this was built not from limestone but from sandstone drawn from the quarry of Trá Leachain (Flaggy Beach) about 2 km to the southwest.

In 1570, it was owned by Sir Donald (or Donnell) O'Brien of the O'Brien dynasty and in 1582 it was occupied by Brian MacCahill O'Connor. In 1583, much of the property in the area was surrendered to the Crown and regranted to Turlough O'Brien of Ennistymon. Doonagore soon fell to the MacClancy (or Clancy) family, the hereditary brehons or lawyers of the O'Briens.

In September 1588, a ship of the Spanish Armada was wrecked below the castle. One-hundred-seventy survivors were caught by the High Sheriff of Clare, Boetius Clancy and hanged at Doonagore Castle or on a nearby Iron Age barrow near Doolin called Cnocán an Crochaire (Hangman's Hill).

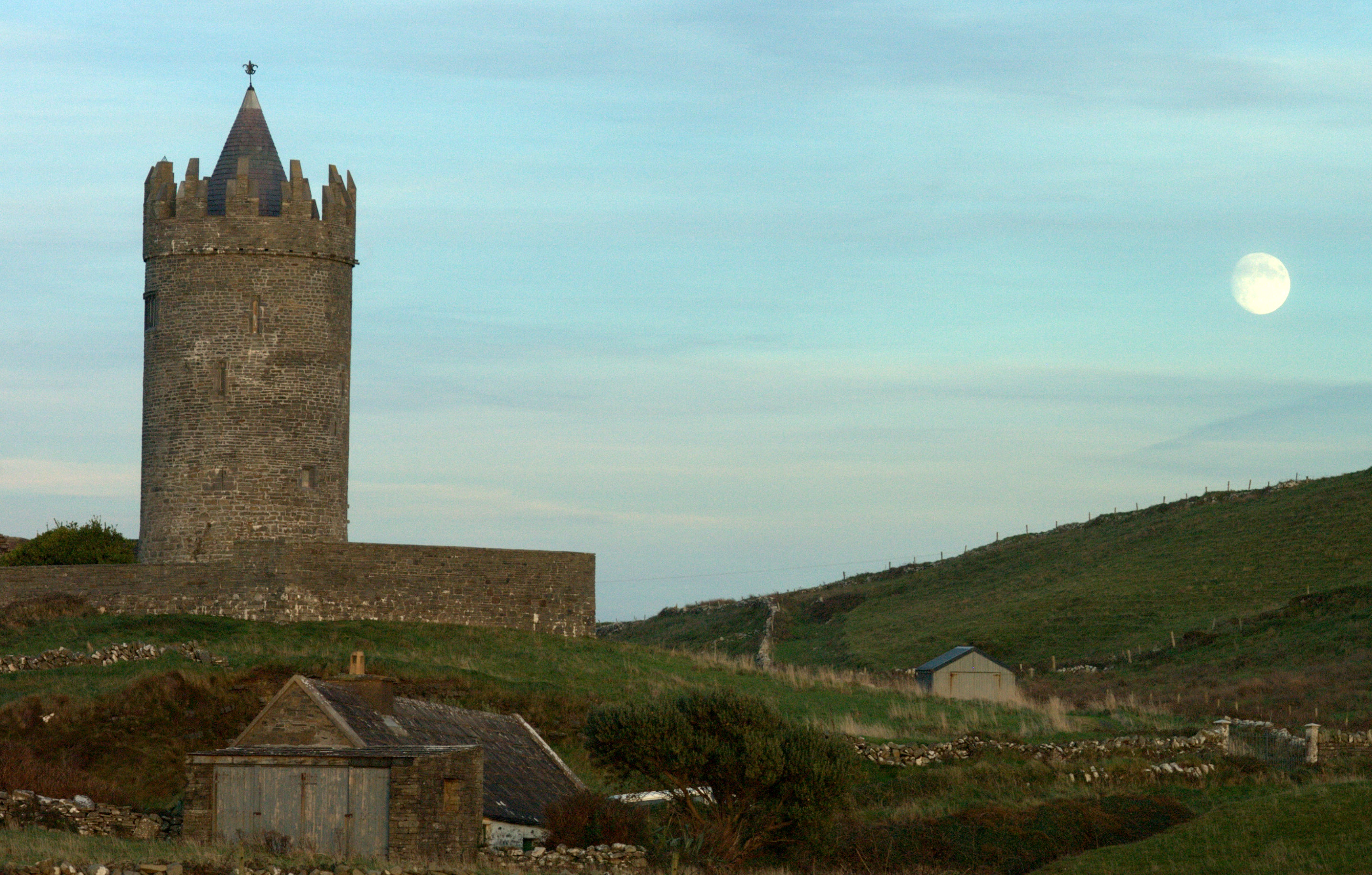
Doonagore Castle from the SW

After the 1641 rebellion Doonagore was granted to John Sarsfield in the Cromwellian settlement.

In the late 17th or early 18th century, the castle came into the possession of the Gore family, resulting in the false etymology of "Gore's Castle". They repaired the castle in the early 19th century, but by 1837 it had once again fallen into a state of disrepair.

It was restored in the 1970s by architect Percy Le Clerc for a private purchaser, an Irish-American named John C. Gorman whose family still owns it.

== Description ==
Doonagore is one of only three cylindrical tower houses in the Burren region, the others being Newtown Castle and Faunarooska near Fanore. Mostly built from sandstone, some of its decorative features are carved from limestone. The tower house originally had four floors plus cellar with a beehive vault between the first and second floors. The doorway was protected by a machicolation connected to the wall walk. The bawn wall surrounded the tower.

== Today ==
The castle is a private holiday home and not open to the public.
