= R479 road (Ireland) =

Road in Ireland

R479 road
- Bóthar R479
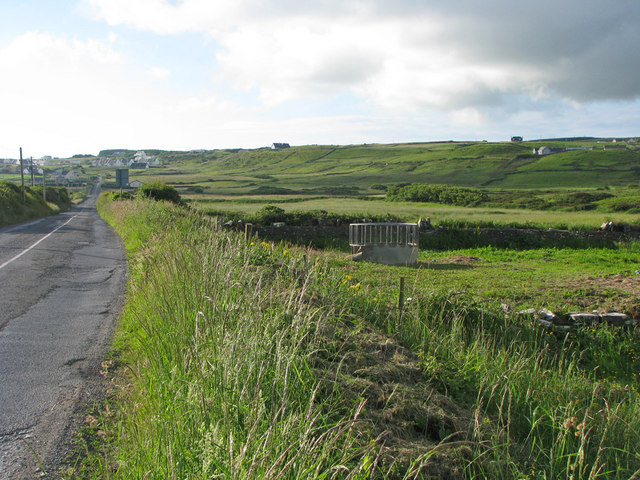
- R479 near Doolin

Route information
- Length: 6.3 km (3.9 mi)

Major junctions
- From: R477 at Ballynalackan, County Clare
- R459 at Doolin
- To: R478 at Coogyulla

Location
- Country: Ireland

Highway system
- Roads in Ireland; Motorways; Primary; Secondary; Regional
← R478	→ R480

The R479 road is a regional road in Ireland. It is located west of The Burren in County Clare. The road forms part of the Wild Atlantic Way.

The R479 travels southwest from the R477 to Doolin. Here the road turns southeast before ending at the R478. The R479 is 6.3 km (3.9 mi) long.
