= Micho Russell =

Irish musician

Micho Russell (25 March 1915 – 19 February 1994) was an Irish musician and author best known for his expert tin whistle performance. He also played the simple-system flute and was a collector of traditional music and folklore.

== Biography ==
Russell was born in Doonagore, Doolin, County Clare, Ireland. Russell came from a musically renowned family; his mother played the concertina, and his father was a sean-nós singer. He had two brothers, Packie and Gussie, who were also musicians. He also had two sisters. He never married.

=== Music ===
Russell taught himself to play the tin whistle by ear, beginning at the age of eleven. The 1960s revival of Irish traditional music brought him attention and performance opportunities. In 1973, Russell won the All-Ireland tin whistle competition, which further increased demand for his performances. Like Séamus Ennis, Russell was also known for his spoken introductions to tunes in his live performances, which incorporated folklore and legend. His knowledge of tradition extended past music to language, stories, dance, herbal lore, and old country cures.

=== Death ===
Russell died in a car accident on 19 February 1994 on his way home from a gig just prior to going back into the studio to record another CD.

== Works ==
=== Original music ===
"Micho Russell's Reel," his only known composition, is a variant of an older tune he called "Carthy's Reel." He told Charlie Piggott, "...So Carthy was beyond anyway, and he heard the old tune from a piper playing it, and he had the first part but only three-quarters of the second part. So when Séamus Ennis came around collecting music, I put in the last bit. That's roughly the story of the tune." The reel has been recorded by other artists such as Mary Bergin. His best-known songs were John Phillip Holland and The Well of Spring Water.

=== Discography ===
Micho Russell performs on the following recordings
Year	Artist	Title	Label	Notes
1975	Micho, Pakie and Gusie Russell	The Russell Family of Doolin, Co. Clare	Topic Records	Recorded in O'Connor's Bar, Doolin January 1974. See track listing of 1993 reissue at Irishtune.info.
1976	Micho Russell	Traditional Country Music of Co. Clare	Free Reed	Reissued on CD by Free Reed in 2008.
1979	Aggie Whyte	Aggie Whyte	Self published.	Micho plays with Aggie on tracks 2 and 3 of disc 2. See track listing at Irishtune.info.
1982	Micho Russell	Micho Russell	Triskell	LP format.
1987	various	Ireland. Irlande.	UNESCO	See track 12 in the track listing at Irishtune.info.
1990	Micho Russell	Under the Cliffs of Moher	Xeric	
1993	Micho Russell	The Limestone Rock	GTD Heritage Recording Co. Ltd.	See track listing at Irishtune.info.
1993	Micho Russell	The Man from Clare	GTD Heritage Recording Co. Ltd.	features duets with Eugene Lambe on Flute and Tin Whistle
1993	various	Wooden Flute Obsession	International Traditional Music Society	See track 15 of disc 2 in the track listing at Irishtune.info.
1994	John Williams	John Williams	Green Linnet Records	See track listing at Irishtune.info.
1995	Micho Russell	The Wind that shakes the Barley	GTD Heritage Recording Co. Ltd.	Features Music, Song and Folklore. See track listing at Irishtune.info.
1995	Micho Russell	In Our Own Dear Land	GTD Heritage Recording Co. Ltd.	A similar mix of Music, Song and stories. See track listing at Irishtune.info.
1995	Micho Russell	Ireland's Whistling Ambassador	The Pennywhistler's Press	Includes a 28-page booklet with a biography and notes on his music. There is also a video release with different music. See track listing at Irishtune.info.
2015	Micho Russell	Rarities & Old Favorites 1949–1993: Tin Whistle, Flute & Songs From North Clare & Beyond	The Pennywhistler's Press	A double-CD with forty-nine tracks that span Micho's entire career. Includes a 16-page booklet. Released both as a download and a physical CD. See track listing at Irishtune.info.

=== Books ===
Micho Russell wrote the following books
Year	Title	Publisher
1980	The Piper's Chair	Ossian Publications
1986	The Piper's Chair No. 2	Canal Press, N.Y.
1988	The road to Aran: Songs, Folklore and Music of West of Ireland	Micho Russell, Doolin.
1990	Doolin's Micho Russell	N.Y.
1991.	Micho's Dozen	Ennistymon Festival of Traditional Singing, Co. Clare.
1992	Music & Folklore of Doonagore	Micho Russell, Doolin.

== See also ==
- List of Irish music collectors
