= Doolin =

Coastal village in County Clare, Ireland

Doolin Dúlainn
- Village
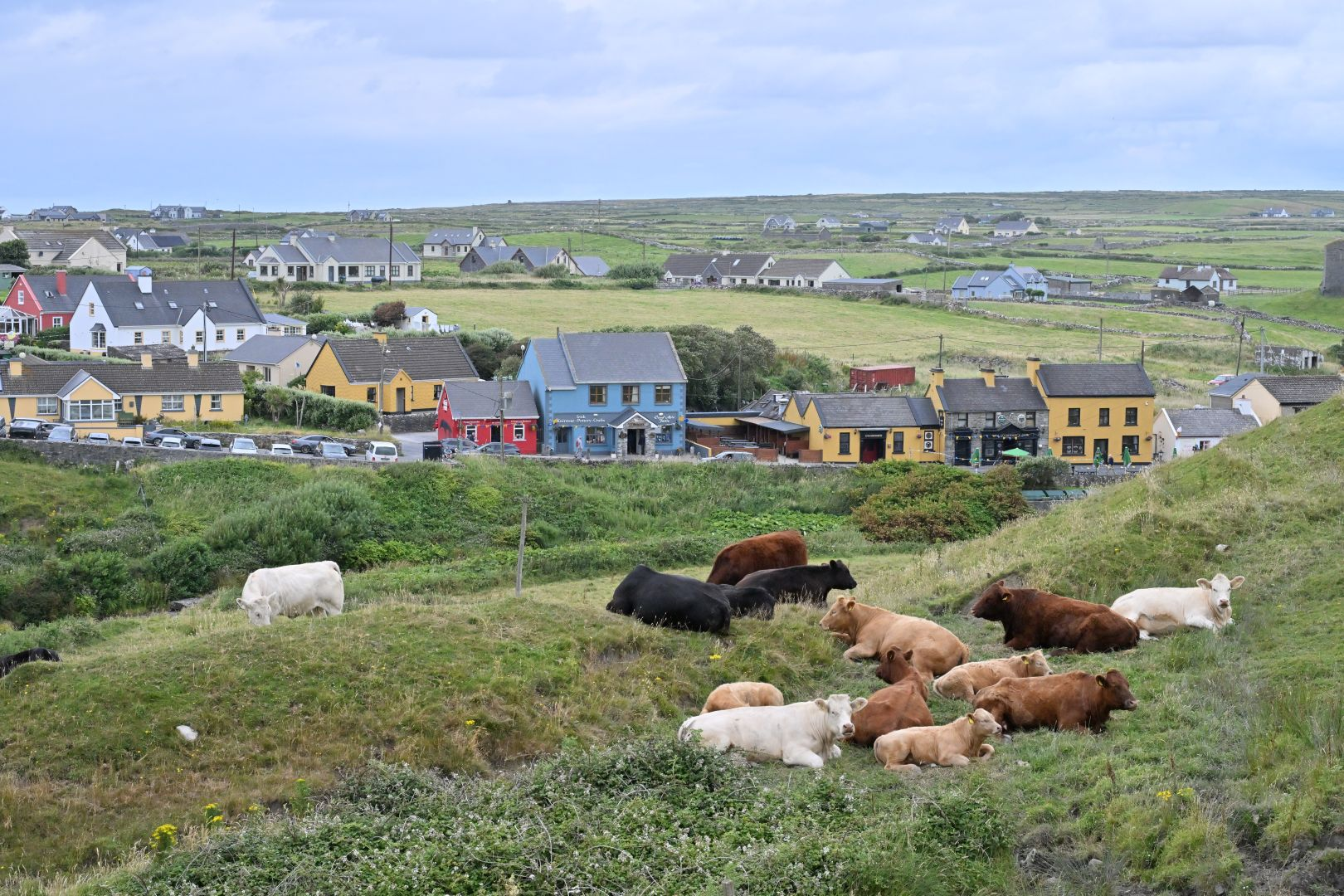
- Fisher Street in Doolin

- Location in Ireland
- Coordinates: 53.016°N 9.377°W
- Country: Ireland
- Province: Munster
- County: County Clare
- Elevation: 20 m (66 ft)
- Irish Grid Reference: R066965

Doolin (Irish: Dúlainn) is a coastal village in County Clare, Ireland, on the Atlantic coast. It is southwest of the spa town of Lisdoonvarna and 4 miles from the Cliffs of Moher. It is a noted centre of traditional Irish music, which is played nightly in its pubs, making it a popular tourist destination. There are numerous nearby archaeological sites, many dating to the Iron Age and earlier. Doonagore Castle and Ballinalacken Castle are also in the area. The area was officially classified as part of the West Clare Gaeltacht (an Irish-speaking community) prior to the 1950s, and maintains a connection with Irish-speaking areas - including via its maritime connection with the Aran Islands.

== Amenities and tourism ==
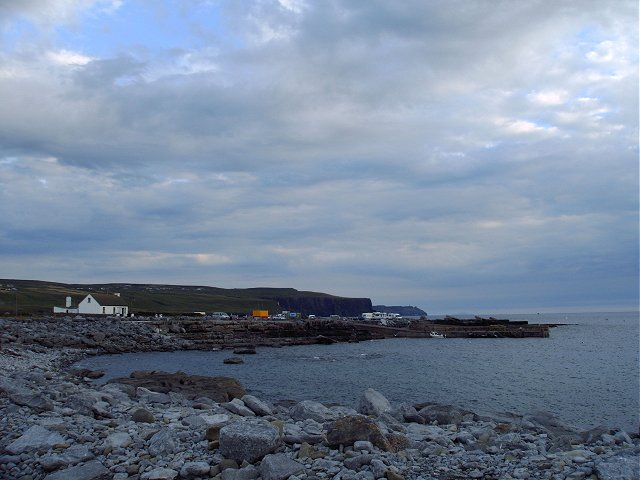
Evening at Doolin Harbour, with the Cliffs of Moher and Hag's Head visible in the distance

=== Layout ===
The village of Doolin does not have a defined centre, comprising a number of "scattered" sections:

- "The Harbour" is the departing point for boat trips to the Aran Islands and the Cliffs of Moher. There is also a campsite nearby
- "Fisher Street" has O'Connor's Pub and several shops and hostels.
- "Fitz's Cross" has a hostel, campsite, two new hotels and another pub which opened in 2006
- "Roadford" has McGann's and McDermott's pubs, four restaurants, two hostels and a number of B&Bs. Trips to Doolin Cave are also run from here.

The Aille River runs from the hills of the Burren down past Doolin to meet the sea. The small Crab Island is a short distance out from Doolin Harbour, barren except for the remains of an early 19th-century stone constabulary outpost.

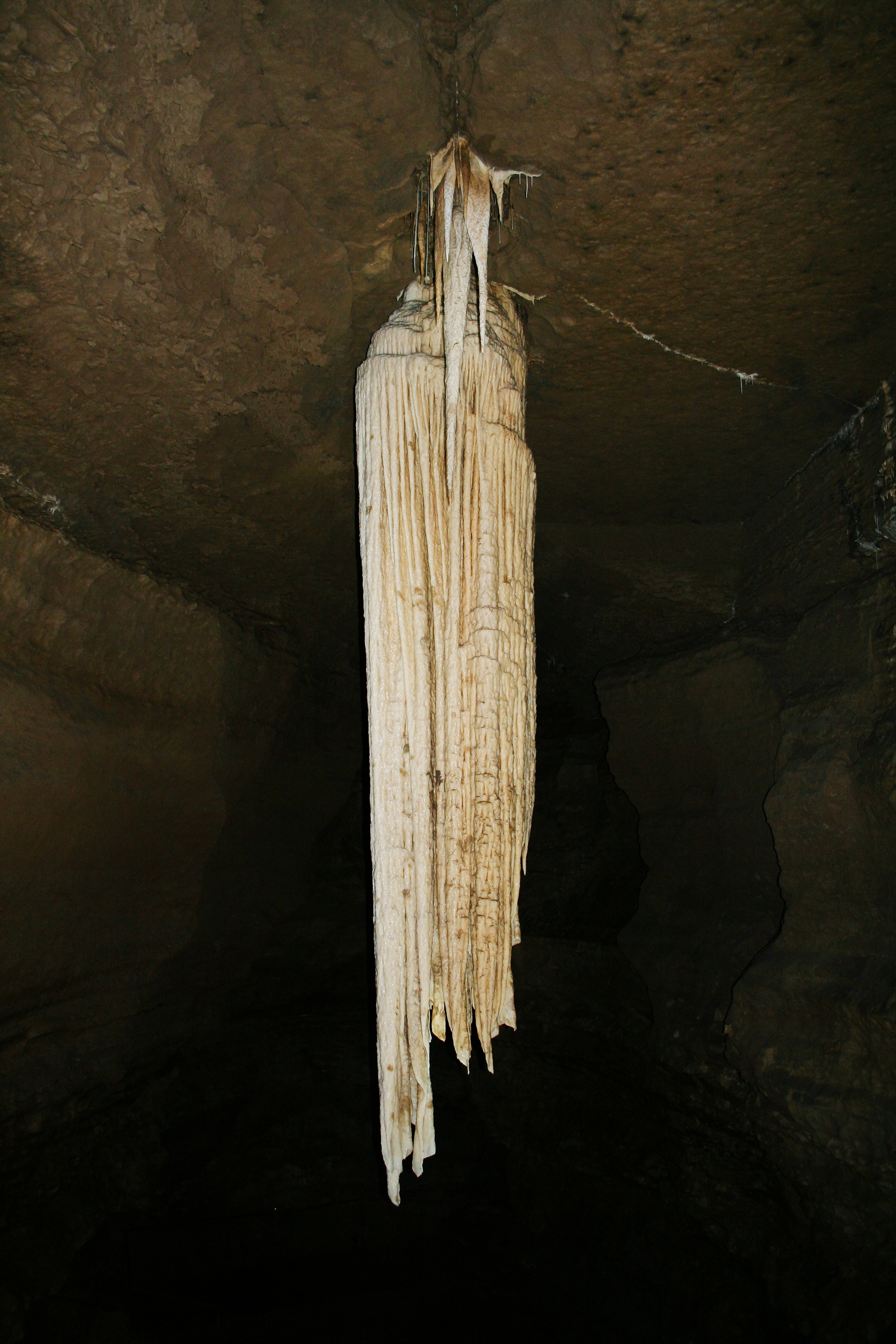
The Great Stalactite at Doolin Cave

=== Doolin Cave ===
The Great Stalactite, measuring 7.3 metres, was discovered in 1952. According to the Doolin Cave website, it is the largest stalactite in the Northern hemisphere. Owing to environmental protection measures, concurrent visitor numbers are limited to 20 per tour.

=== Surfing ===
Doolin is a noted surfing destination. A break which generates Ireland's biggest wave, 'Aill na Searrach', is just off the Cliffs of Moher. The wave features in the movie Waveriders. Crab Island is also a local surfing spot.

=== Rock climbing ===
As well as serving as an accommodation centre for visitors to the major limestone rock climbing area of Ailladie (most climbs at or above E1 5b), a short 8 km drive away, Doolin has its own less-popular sea-cliff rock-climbing area, with several routes recorded. Like Ailladie, the cliffs are single-pitch steep limestone; however the rock is not of a high quality, the cliffs are tidal, and access is not as easy. There are also several smaller inland crags scattered throughout the Burren region (e.g. Ballyryan, Murroughkilly, Aill na Cronain and Oughtdarra), and some good bouldering to be found along the coast, most notably at Lackglass, which was first bouldered in April, 2005.

=== Pubs ===
Pubs in Doolin include Fitzpatricks, Gus O'Connor's, McDermott's, and McGann's. The Micho Russell Festival Weekend is held each year after the last Friday in February.

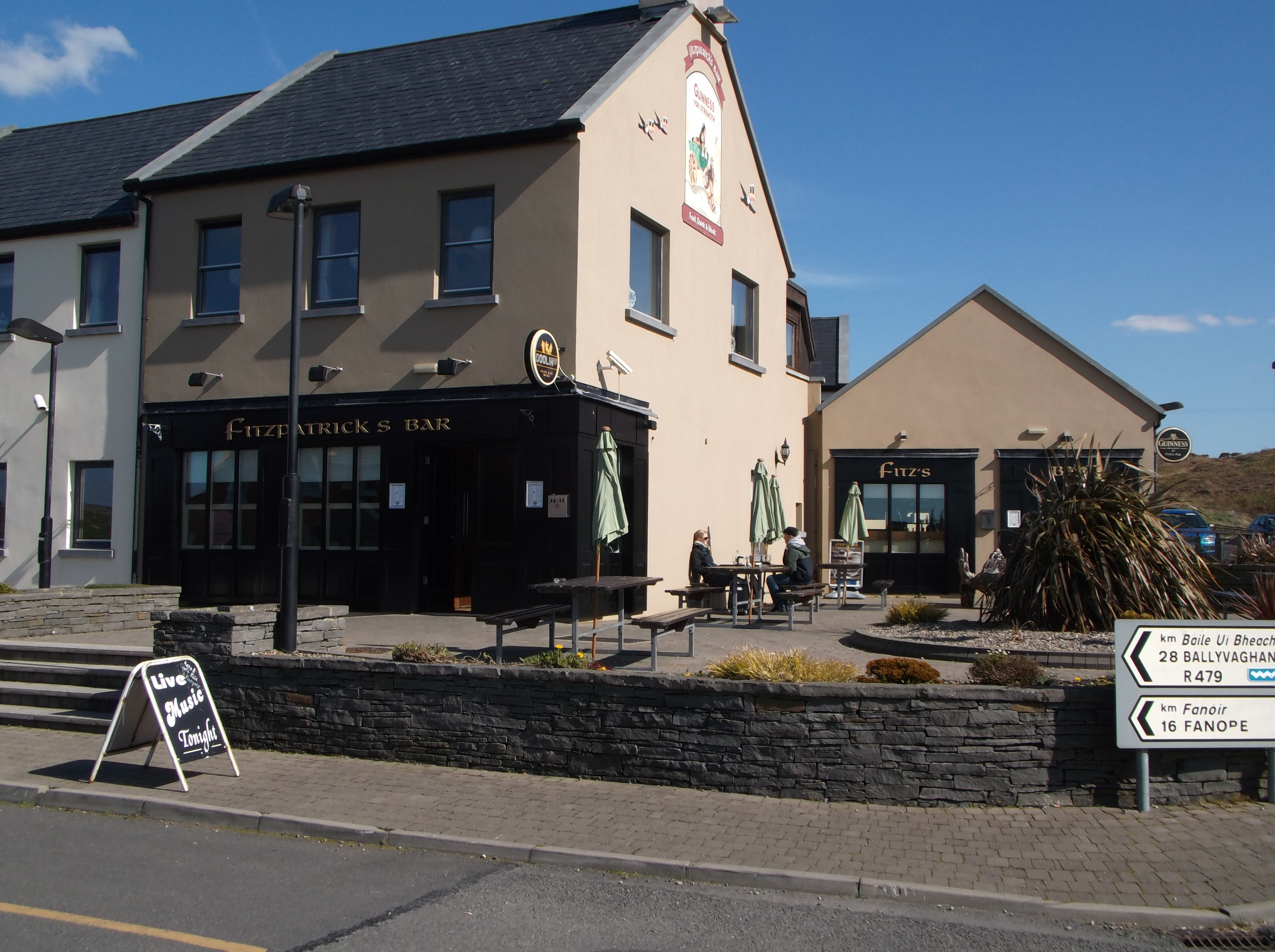
Fitz's Bar Doolin. Founded 2006.

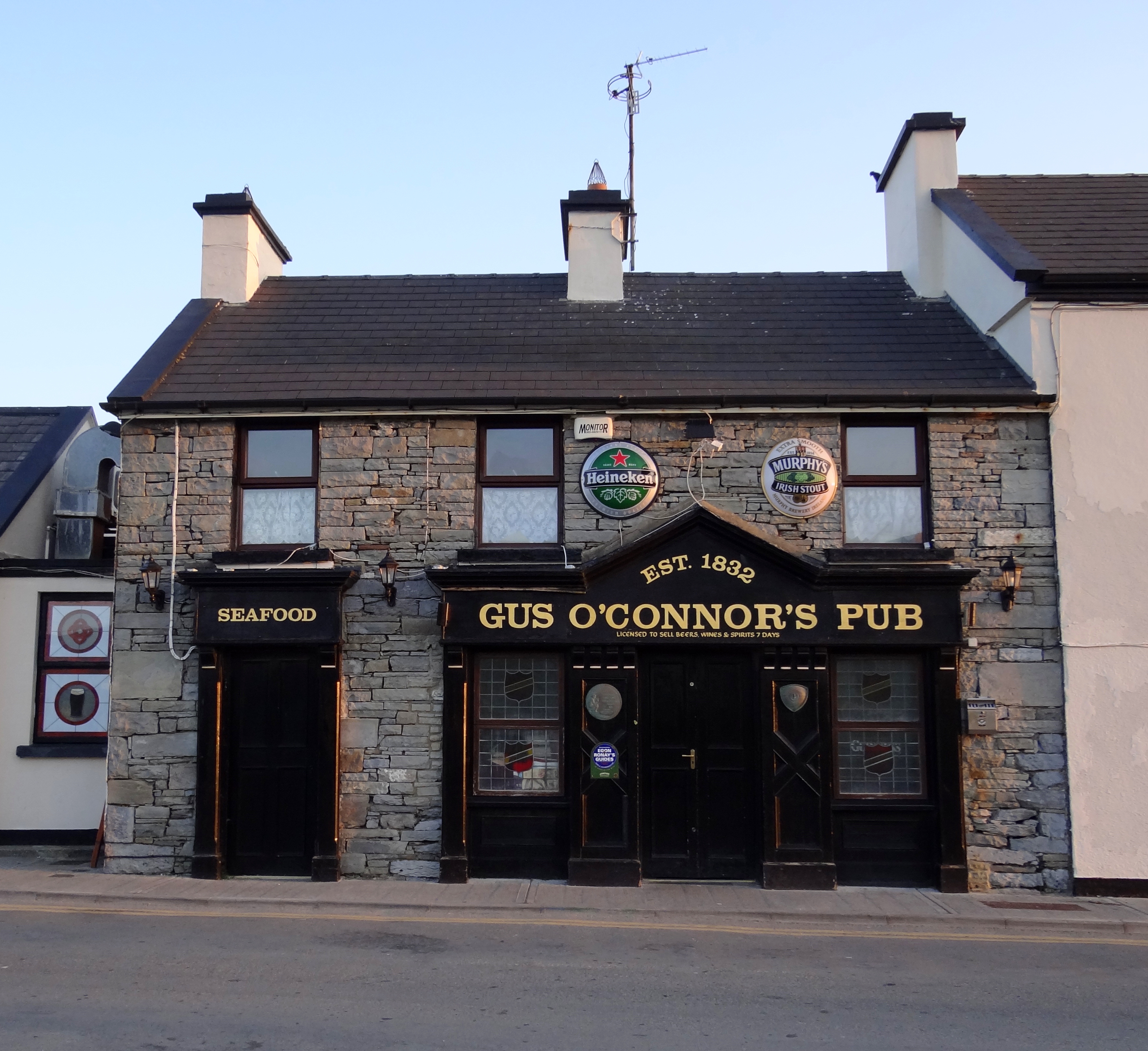
Gus O'Connor's pub, founded in 1832.

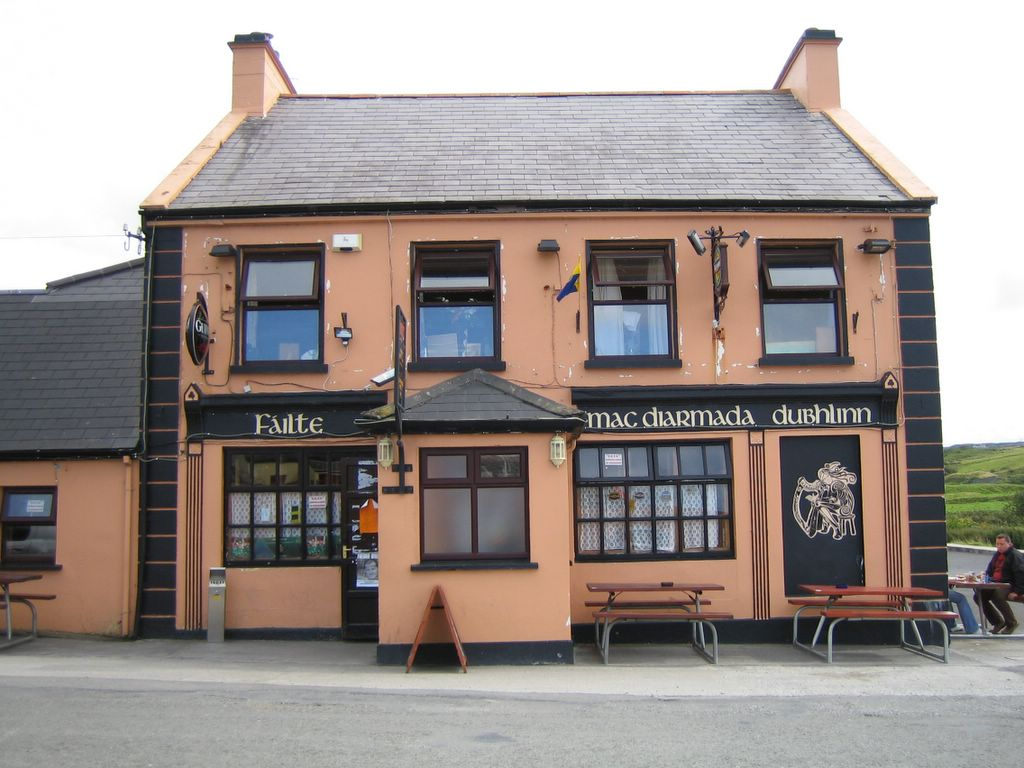
McDermott's pub, founded in 1867.

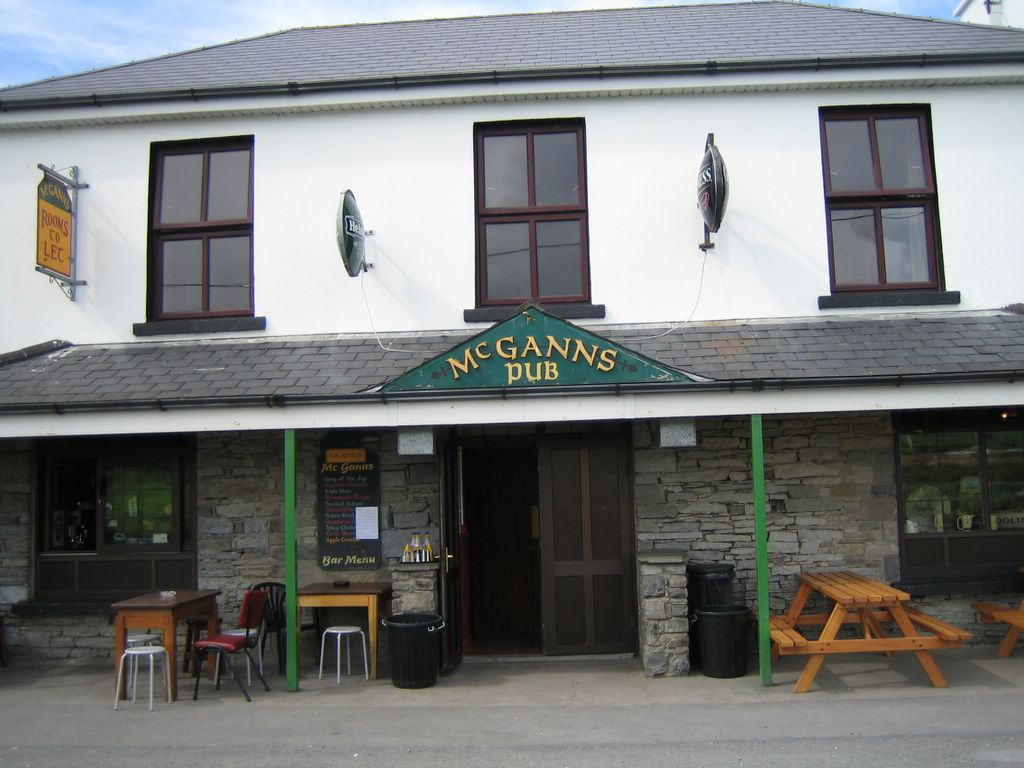
McGann's pub, founded in 1976.

=== Dining ===
The restaurant Homestead Cottage received a Michelin star in 2023.

== Transport ==
=== Ferry ===
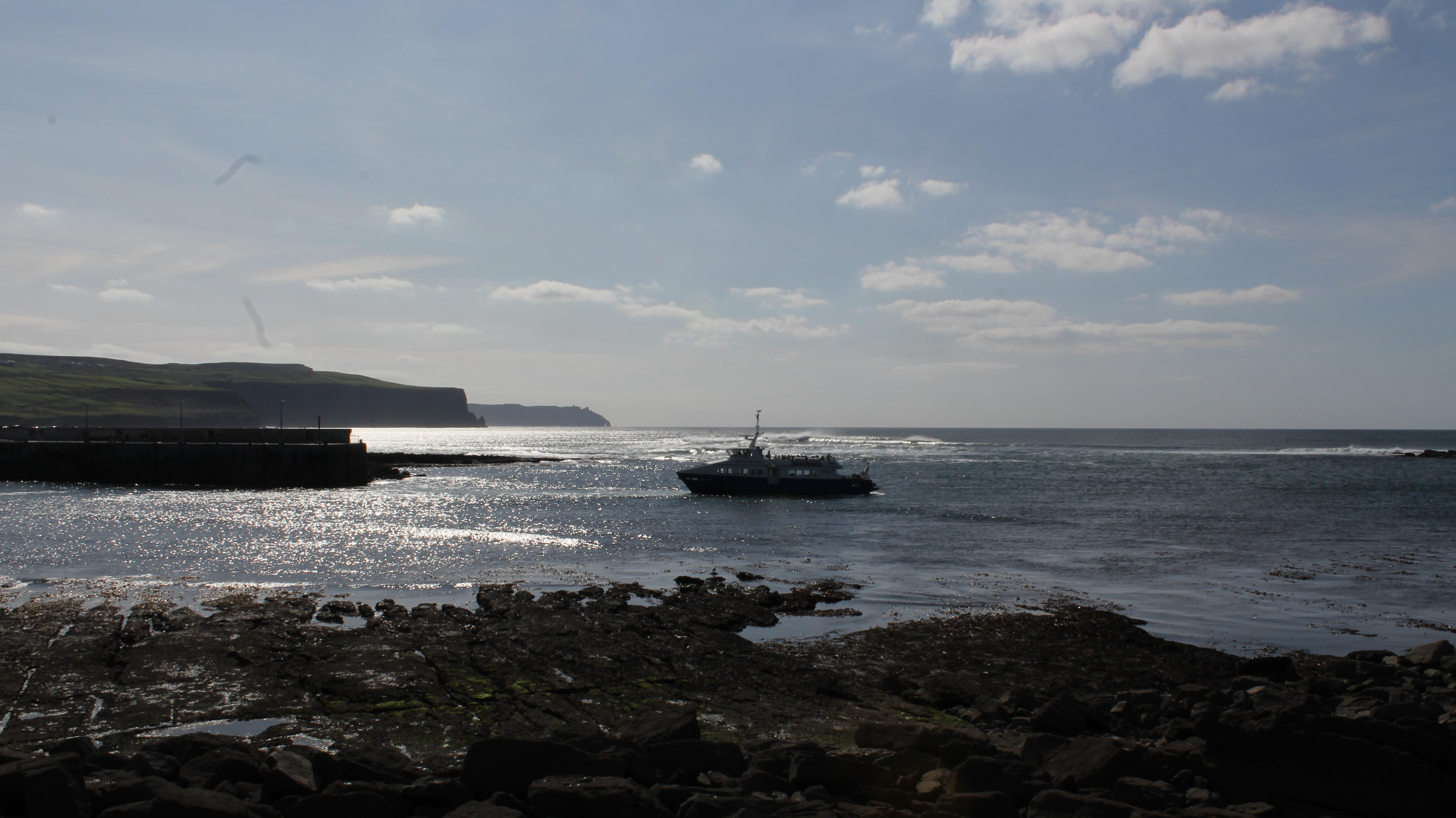
A ferry approaching Doolin Pier

Doolin is one of three places (Galway and the village of Rossaveal on the northwest shore of Galway Bay are the others) with ferry services to the Aran Islands, which are visible from the town. A ferry service also brings tourists to the base of the Cliffs of Moher from Doolin Pier. There is also an Irish Coast Guard station at Doolin Pier.

=== Bus ===
As Doolin is close to the Cliffs of Moher, a bus service between Galway and Ennis calls at both Doolin and the cliffs in each direction. Bus Éireann route 350 links Doolin to Ennis, Ennistymon, Cliffs of Moher, Lisdoonvarna, Fanore, Kinvara and Galway. There are a number of journeys each way daily. Onward rail and bus connections are available at Ennis and Galway.

=== Road ===
Two regional roads serve the village. The R479 connects the village both with coastal areas to the north and with Lisdoonvarna to the east. The R459 connects the village to the Cliffs of Moher, the Burren Way and the Inisheer ferry port.

== People ==
Musicians associated with Doolin, who have lived there or played in its pubs, include Micho Russell and his brothers Packie and Gussie, Sharon Shannon, Davy Spillane, and Steve Wickham of The Waterboys.

== Popular culture ==
Doolin is the main setting for the 2007 PlayStation 3 game Folklore. According to the game's storyline, the Netherworld, the world of the dead is a realm that can only be accessed from one place in the world, the sea-side village of Doolin.

The Celtic band Gaelic Storm has a fiddle tune which references the town called "The Devil Went Down to Doolin" (presumably a play on the popular song The Devil Went Down to Georgia) on their album Herding Cats.

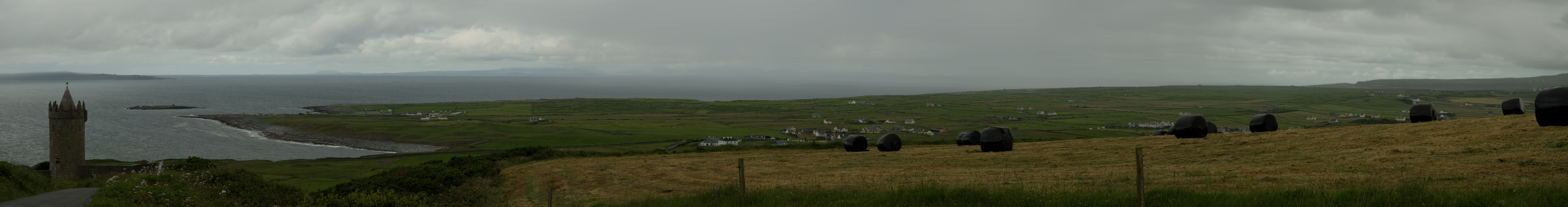
Just outside Doolin above Doonagore Castle

== See also ==
- List of towns and villages in Ireland
