= Aille River (County Clare) =

River in County Clare, Ireland

Coordinates: 53.0087°N 9.39058°W

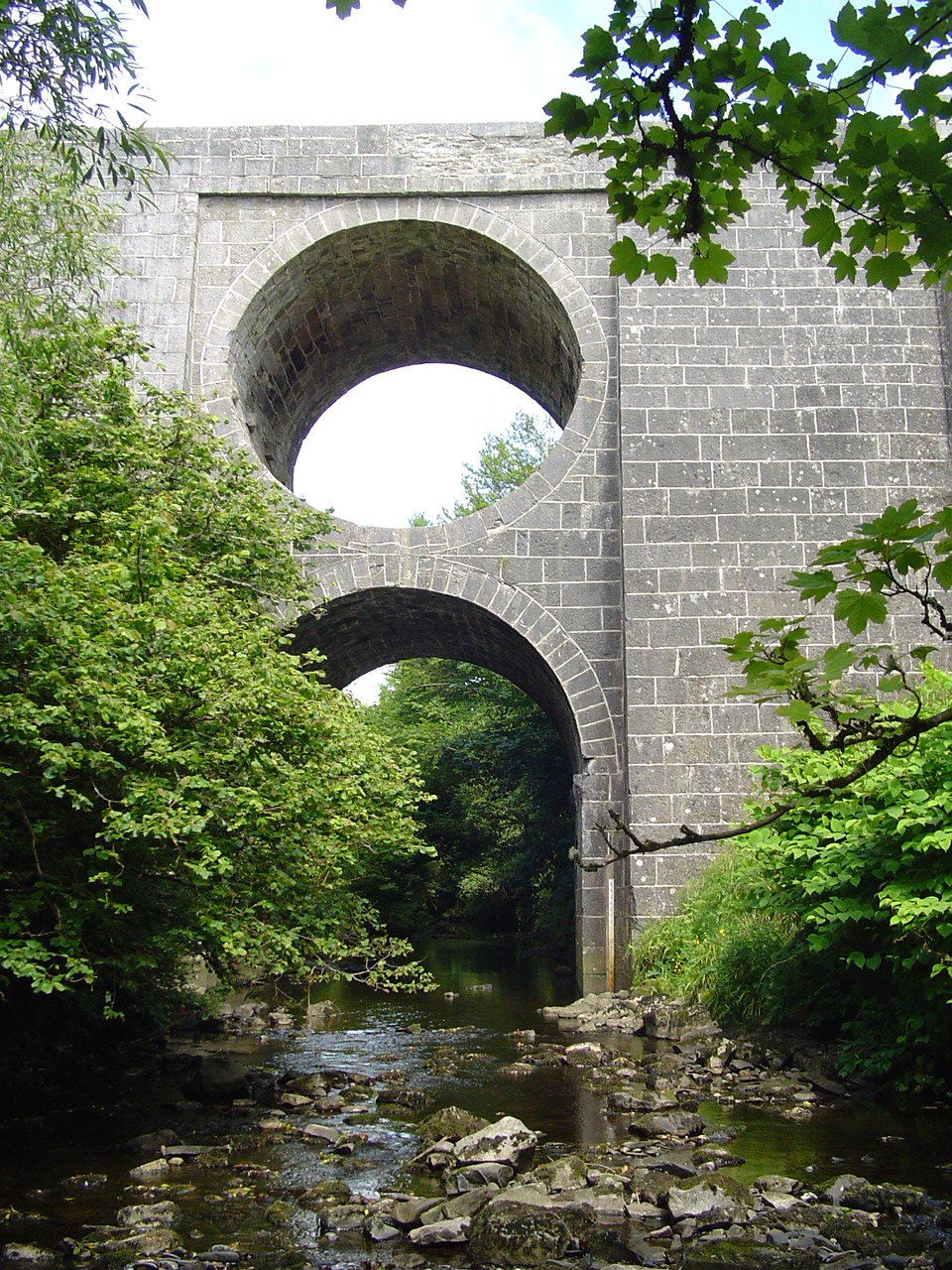
A bridge over the Aille River

The Aille River in County Clare in Ireland rises on the slopes of Slieve Elva in the Burren. It flows through the spa town of Lisdoonvarna and on to Doolin, where it reaches the sea not far from the Cliffs of Moher. Flowing through Lisdoonvarna it gives rise to sulphur, iron, and magnesium wells there. In summer, the river often disappears into the limestone cave system in Doolin.
