= Lisdoonvarna =

Town in County Clare, Ireland

Lisdoonvarna Irish: Lios Dúin Bhearna
- Town
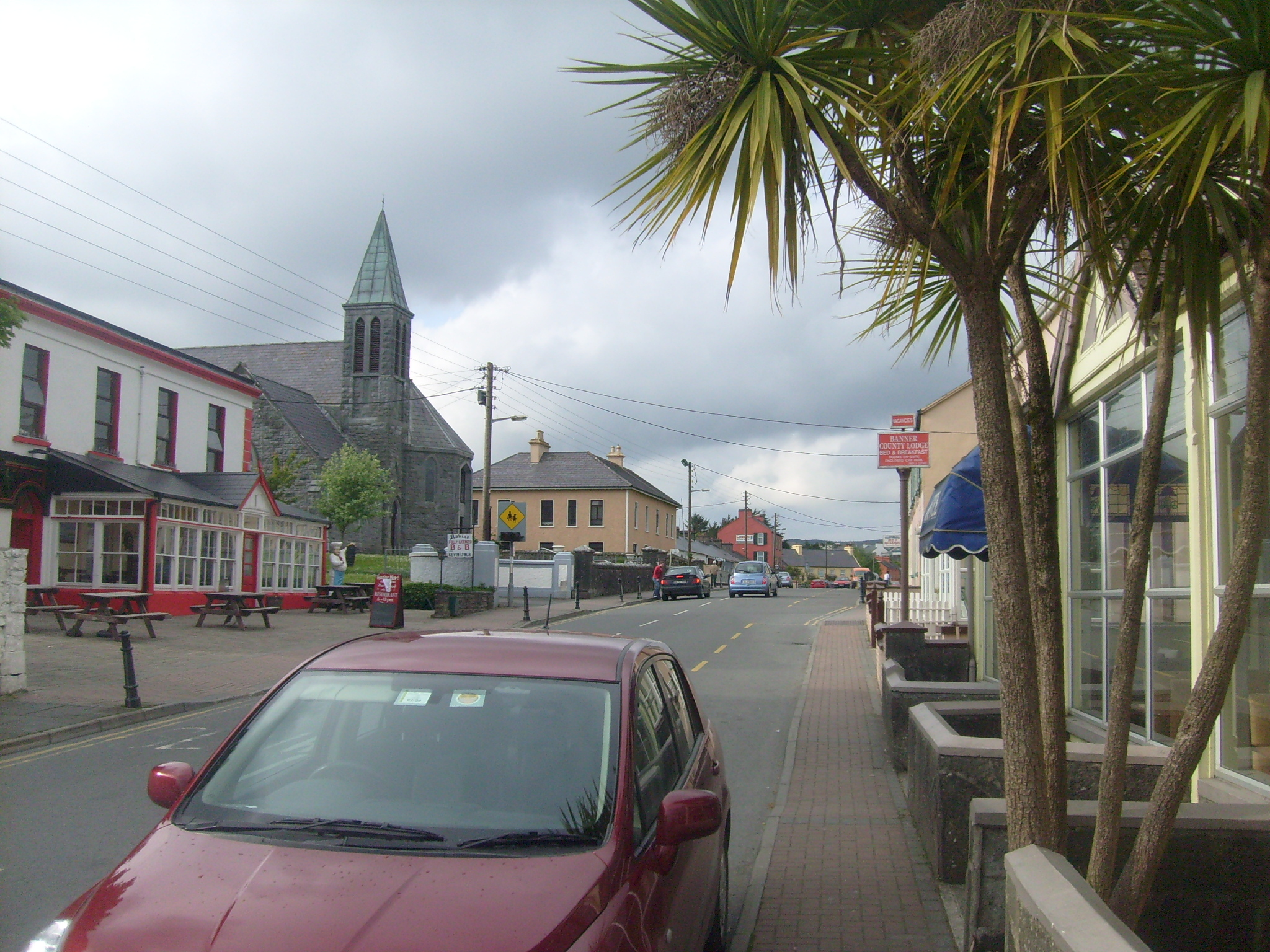
- Lisdoonvarna Main Street

- Location in Ireland
- Coordinates: 53°01′49″N 9°17′22″W
- Country: Ireland
- Province: Munster
- County: County Clare

Population (2022)
  - Total: 934
- Time zone: UTC+0 (WET)
  - Summer (DST): UTC-1 (IST (WEST))
- Irish Grid Reference: R133984

Lisdoonvarna (Irish: Lios Dúin Bhearna, meaning 'fort of the gapped keep') is a spa town in County Clare in Ireland. The town is famous for its music and festivals. Although the Lisdoonvarna Music Festival was discontinued in the 1980s, the town still hosts an annual matchmaking festival each September. The population was 934 at the 2022 census.

== Geography ==
Lisdoonvarna is located in the area of County Clare known as the Burren, on the N67 road between Ballyvaughan and Ennistymon. The Aille River flows through the town, where it is joined by the Gowlaun and Kilmoon streams.

The town is in the civil parish of Kilmoon. Nearby townlands in this parish include Ballyinsheen Beg, Ballyinsheen More, Rathbaun and Rooska.

== Name ==
The town takes its name from the Irish Lios Dúin Bhearna (lios dúin="enclosured fort" and bhearna="of the gap"). It is believed that the fort referred to in this name is the green earthen fort of Lissateeaun ("Fort of the fairy hill"), which lies about 3 km (2 mi) northeast of the town, near the remains of a Norman era castle.

== History ==
Historical population
Year	Pop.	±%
1841	257	—
1851	201	−21.8%
1861	151	−24.9%
1871	141	−6.6%
1881	218	+54.6%
1891	171 (Note: Lisdoonvarna was not regarded as a census town until 1891. Pre-1891 totals are for the townlands of Lisdoonvarna and Rathbaun, where the spas are located, and the first guesthouses were built for tourists in the 1870s. For a discussion on the accuracy of pre-famine census returns see Lee, J. J. (1981). J. M. Goldstrom; L. A. Clarkson (eds.). "On the accuracy of the pre-famine Irish censuses". Irish Population, Economy and Society: 54. and Mokyr, Joel; Ó Gráda, Cormac (November 1984). "New Developments in Irish Population History, 1700-1850". The Economic History Review. New Series. Vol. 37. pp. 473–488.)	−21.6%
1901	223	+30.4%
1911	249	+11.7%
1926	220	−11.6%
1936	193	−12.3%
1946	231	+19.7%
1951	332	+43.7%
1956	618	+86.1%
1961	625	+1.1%
1966	656	+5.0%
1971	459	−30.0%
1981	607	+32.2%
1986	648	+6.8%
1991	842	+29.9%
1996	890	+5.7%
2002	822	−7.6%
2006	767	−6.7%
2011	739	−3.7%
2016	829	+12.2%
2022	934	+12.7%

The present town is a comparatively new one by Irish standards, dating mainly from the start of the 19th century.

The spa officially opened in 1845, but the town was visited before by people partaking of the waters, fed by sulfur springs thought to have medicinal benefits. Even by the 1880s, however, the facilities were quite primitive. The wells were privately owned by the Guthrie family. They were later developed and baths built by the new owner, a Dr. Westropp, who lived in a house overlooking the spa.

On 11 September 1887, the house of landowner Mike Walsh was attacked by "moonlighters" (members of one of the organized bands of desperados that carried on a system of agrarian outrages in Ireland). A detachment of the Royal Irish Constabulary (RIC) defended the house and its owner, and there was heavy fighting in and around the house. Head Constable Whelehan was killed. All the moonlighters were captured. Seven constables, four acting constables and two head constables received the Constabulary Medal for valour.

The spa prospered into the 20th century. In 1920, it was called the "Homberg of the Irish priests".

The area was officially classified as part of the West Clare Gaeltacht, an Irish-speaking community, until 1956.

Historical maps of Lisdoonvarna show how the Main Street looked in the nineteenth century. It also gives the location of the RIC barracks and the many hotels associated with the town, such as Queen's Hotel and Eagle Hotel, amongst others.

== Arts and culture ==
=== Matchmaking festival ===
In September each year since 1857, one of Europe's largest matchmaking events is held in the town, attracting upwards of 40,000 romantic hopefuls, bachelor farmers, and accompanying revellers. The month-long event is an important tourist attraction. The current matchmaker is Willie Daly, a fourth-generation matchmaker.

=== Music festival ===
The Lisdoonvarna Music Festival took place near the town between 1978 and 1983 and is celebrated in a song written by Irish folk singer Christy Moore. This festival took place until 1983; it ended after the last event was marred by a riot and the accidental drowning of eight people.

== Infrastructure ==
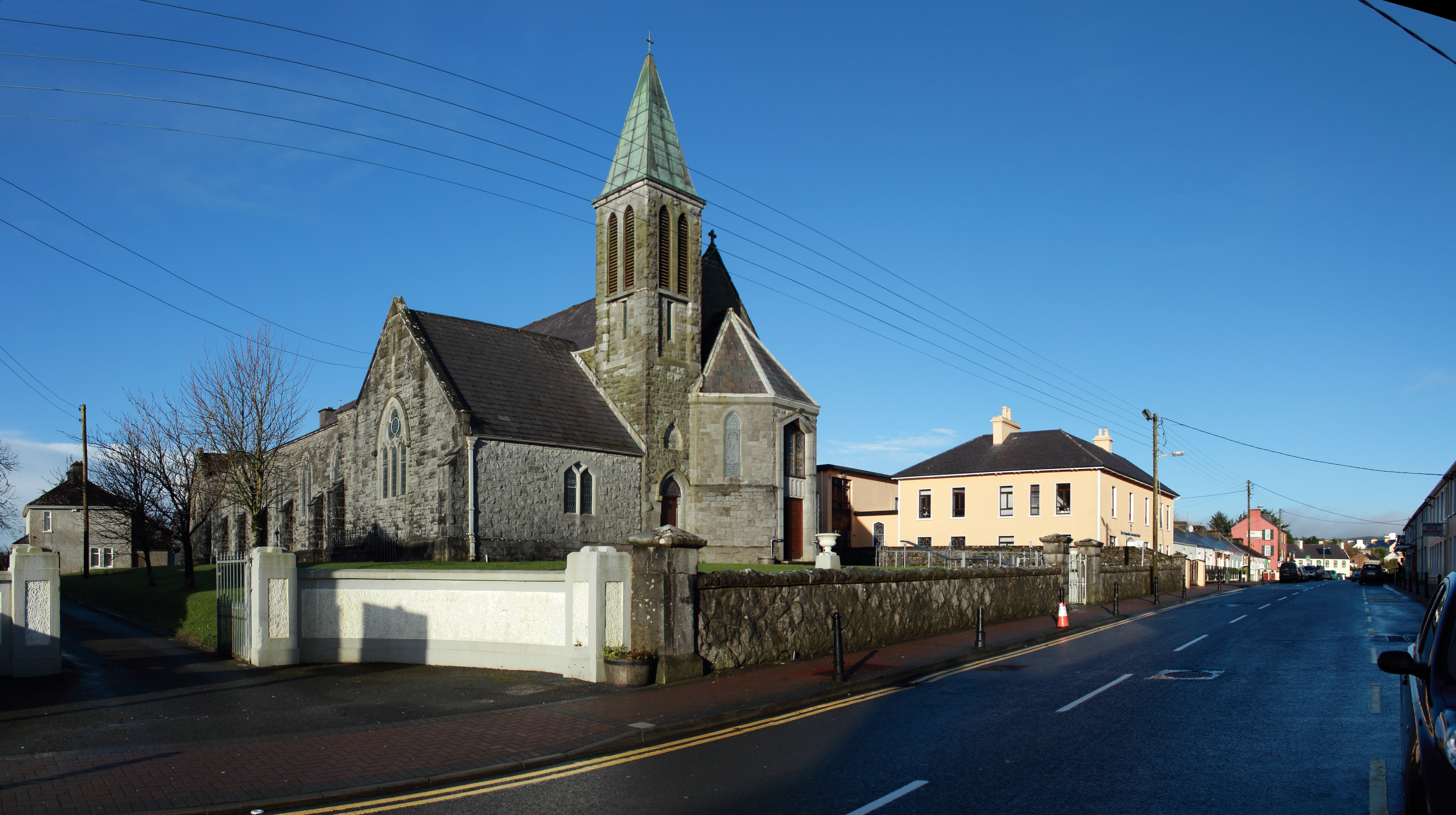
Victorian Gothic revival Roman Catholic Church, Lisdoonvarna

=== Spa ===
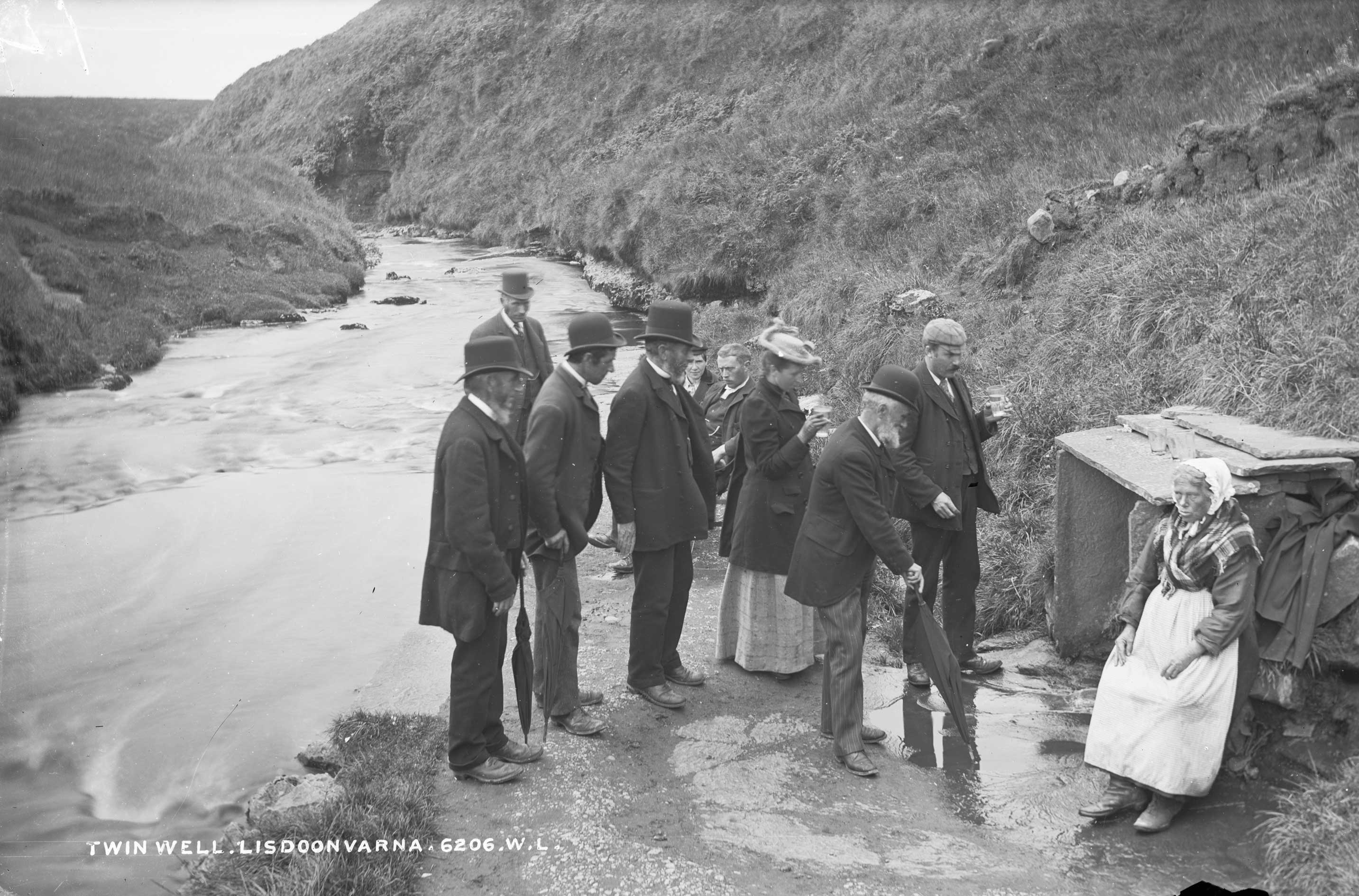
A group taking the waters at the Twin Wells on the banks of the Aille river at Lisdoonvarna, c. 1900

The spa originally consisted of four wells. Copperas Well, on Kilmoon stream, is now closed. It was used externally for skin conditions, ulcers and sores. The Magnesia and Iron Well remains open in season. The Twin Wells offer water rich in iron and sulphur. The main sulphur well lies at the bottom of the hill. All the waters contain iodine.

The spa park is located at the confluence of the Aille and Gowlaun rivers. The spa complex features a Victorian pump house among other amenities.

=== Transport ===
Bus Éireann route 350 links Lisdoonvarna to several locations: Ennis, Ennistymon, Cliffs of Moher, Doolin, Fanore, Kinvara and Galway. There are a number of journeys each way daily. Onward rail and bus connections are available at Ennis and Galway.

Spectacle Bridge, spanning the Aille River, dates from 1850.

== See also ==
- List of towns and villages in Ireland
- Plan, Aragon, a village in Spain where in 1985 it was organised the "caravan of women".
