= Curtin (surname) =

Curtin is a surname which is most common in the Province of Munster in Ireland. It takes several variant forms transliterated from the Irish language, such as: Mac Cruitín, Mac Curtain or Ó Cruitin, most of which are anglicised as Curtin. The literal translated meaning of the Irish elements of the name are Mac (Son of) + Cruit (Crooked, and by extension hunchback, or an old name of the harp, by inference to the shape of the Irish harp) + -ín (signifying diminution), hence Little Hunchback, or Little Crooked One, but also Son of the Harp, or One associated with the art of the Irish Harp, which ties in with a traditional role in Gaelic culture. It is believed there are multiple Curtin families with different origins, the most famous of which is the bardic family which stems from Co. Clare. In the census of 1659 in Counties Cork, Kerry and Limerick similar sounding names such as Mac Curatine and O' Curataine were treated as synonymous although they are not the same clan. Curtayne is a variant surname chiefly in south Munster.

== Curtins from County Clare ==
In Clare, the Curtin family were located in Corco Modhruadh (Corcomroe), with their principal hereditary lands at Carrowduff in Killaspuglonane and others in Laghvally in Kilmacrehy. They were regarded as a distinguished, learned family, who served as hereditary historians to the O'Briens of Thomond and other notable local families, including Ó Conchubhair Corcomroe and Ó Lochlainn of the Burren. With the fall of the Gaelic order, one branch remained in Corcomroe at Clooney, but some of the senior familial line moved south into Ibrickane, land retained by the O'Briens, first leasing Tromra Castle (c. 1615), then living around Moyglass with a burial place at Kilfarboy. They had patrons among the Corcu Baiscind. The 17-18th century Irish language scholars and poets Aindrias Mac Cruitín and Aodh Buí Mac Cruitín were members of this family. The Curtins maintained a tradition of learning with a wider influence on literature and native learning in west Clare. Meic Cruitín schools operated in Magh Locha ós Linn Luimnigh (Molough) near Kilrush and Kilmacrechy near Ennistymon and Thomas J. Westropp contended that the learning of Eugene O'Curry was inherited from the earlier activities of the professional poets of Clann Cruitín. The last member of the family with literary standing was Seamus Mac Cruitín a poet, bard and hedge school teacher, a forlorn figure, who worked for O'Curry collecting songs and poems.

Genealogy of Mac Cruitín (Note: Genealogy continued on genealogy of O'Connor CorcoMruad as instructed in the manuscript quoted on page 8 of "The origins of Clann Chruitín".)

Ollamhan	Aithbhleithe	Deágha	Cuirc Ruaidh	Fearghusa
MoDhruadh a quo Corco Modhruadh	Aithbhleithe	Aodha Gnai	Aodha Cuirb	Neachtain	Meic Con	Eirc	Measain Súilléith
Brógáin	Labáinn	Seanáin	Lonáin	Carrthainn	Fraoich	Osgair	Measain Duinn
Cruitín file a quo Mac Cruitín	Maile Ruán	Saorbreathach	Sáortúile	Mudhna	Altán	Conchubhar	Flann
Aodh Óg	Aodh	Conchubhar	Aodh	Giolladh; Chríost
Solamh	Conchubhar
Conchubhar	Criomhthann
Seanchadh	Soladh
Fearbiseach	An Cosnamhach
Eolus	Rolond
Criomhthann	Seán	Aindrias died 1738
Aodh na Tuinne	Tadhg
Conchubhar	Conchúir
Conchubhar Óg	Críostóra
Aodh Buidhe died 1755	Tadhg
Seamus died 1870

Perhaps the most prominent descendant of the Curtins from Clare was Andrew Gregg Curtin (1815/1817–1894) a U.S. lawyer and politician who served as the governor of Pennsylvania during the Civil War.

== Curtins from County Cork ==
The origin of the Curtins of Cork is disputed. Curtins residing in the region are referenced are early as the 14th century in the medieval Irish text, Críchad an Chaoilli as Meic Coirtein o Baile Meig Coirtein & do mhuinntir Rathan iat sein ("the Mac Curtains of Ballymaccurtain, of the Rahan people these are"). They were hereditary proprietors in Fir Maige Féne (the barony of Fermoy), Co. Cork, with their seat at Rahan, a townland and Civil Parish near Mallow. O'Hart held that O'Curtin (the Irish: Ó Cuarthan) was Anglicised by some as "Jourdan". Also, following the Battle of Kinsale Cork saw an influx of Ulster born Macartans, principally descendants of Eachmilidh Mac Artáin, who had their surnames Anglicized as "Mac Curtain" or later as "Curtain". Members of this family included Cornelius Curtain, Fr. Cornelius Mac Curtain and William Curtain. Perhaps the most famous descendant of the Cork Curtins is 20th century Australian Prime Minister John Curtin (1885–1945).

== List of people with the surname Curtin ==
- Andrew Gregg Curtin (1817–1894), American lawyer and politician, 15th Governor of Pennsylvania
- Brennan Curtin (born 1980), American football player
- Brian Curtin (born c. 1951), Irish barrister and judge
- Charles Curtin (1890–1967), English footballer
- Claude Curtin (1920–1994), Australian rules footballer
- Clyde A. Curtin, American flying ace in the Korean War
- Fr. Cornelius Curtain, (d. 1752), Catholic Priest and Irish Poet
- Daniel R. Curtin (1855–1916), American businessman and politician
- Dan Curtin (1898–1980), Australian politician
- Cornelius Curtain (1660–1724), Infantry Captain in the Army of King James II
- Elizabeth Curtain, former Australian Judge
- Florimond-Benjamin MacCurtain, (1764–1857) French Politician, Baron de Kainlis
- General G.W. Curtin, founder of Curtin, Nicholas County, West Virginia
- David Curtin, Irish hurling player
- Deirdre Curtin (born 1960), Irish academic
- Don Curtin, American football player
- Greenwood McCurtain, Principal Chief of the Choctaw Republic
- Hoyt Curtin (1922–2000), American composer and music producer
- James E. Curtin, Arizona politician
- James Michael Curtin (born 1983), better known as Rockstar Spud, English professional wrestler
- Jane Curtin (born 1947), American comedian and actress
- Jeff Curtin (born 1983), American soccer player
- Jeremiah Curtin (1835–1906), American folklorist and translator
- Jim Curtin (born 1979), American soccer player
- John Curtin (1885–1945), Australian politician, 14th Prime Minister of Australia
- John Curtin (U.S. politician) (c. 1865–1925), American politician, California state senator
- John I. Curtin (1837–1911), American general in the American Civil War
- John Thomas Curtin (1921–2017), American judge
- Joseph Curtin, American violinmaker
- Kevin Curtin, New Zealand soccer player
- Leonard Curtin, American Golf Greenskeeper City of Boston
- Luke Curtin (born 1977), American ice hockey player
- Lynne Curtin, American reality television personality, participant in The Real Housewives of Orange County
- Marie Curtin (born 1985), Irish footballer
- Matt Curtin (born 1973), American computer scientist
- Michael Curtin, American politician, member of the Ohio House of Representatives
- Peter Curtin (c. 1943–2014), Australian actor
- Peter Curtain, (born 1962) Australian footballer
- Philip D. Curtin (1922–2009), American historian
- Phyllis Curtin (1921–2016), American soprano
- Pike Curtin (1907–1997), Australian sportsman and economist
- Ronda Curtin (born 1980), American ice hockey player
- Ruth F. Curtain (1941–2018), Australian Mathematician
- Valerie Curtin (born 1945), American actress and screenwriter
- Willard S. Curtin (1905–1996), American politician, U.S. Representative from Pennsylvania
- William Curtain (1658–1724), Irish Poet and Scholar

== List of people with the variants of the surname ==
- Alice Curtayne (1898–1981) was an Irish author and lecturer.
- Bob Curtayne (1894–1970) was an Australian rules footballer.
- Aindrias Mac Cruitín (c. 1650 – c. 1738) was a Gaelic-Irish poet.
- Aodh Buí Mac Cruitín or Hugh MacCurtin (1680–1755) was an Irish poet, tutor, and soldier.
- Gilla Duibin Mac Cruitín (d. 1405), Irish musician.
- Seamus Mac Cruitín (1815–1870), a poet, bard and hedge school teacher.
- Dermot Mac Curtain (born 1957), Irish former sportsperson
- Tomás Mac Curtain (1884–1920), a Lord Mayor of Cork, Ireland.
- Margaret MacCurtain (1929–2020), Irish historian, writer and educator.
- Green McCurtain, Principal Chief of the Choctaw Nation whose surname came through Cornelius McCurtain from Co. Cork, who came to Spanish Florida in the 18th century.
- Seán McCurtin, Seán (John) Patrick McCurtin (McCurtain, Mac Curtáin) (1896–1982), Irish politician

== See also ==
- McCurtain (disambiguation)
