= McCurtain =

McCurtain, Mac Curtain, or variations may refer to:

== People ==
- Conchobhar Mac Curtain (1660–1724), officer in the Royal Irish Army of King James II
- Dermot Mac Curtain (born 1957), Irish hurler
- Florimond-Benjamin MacCurtain (1764–1857), French politician and soldier
- Green McCurtain (Greenwood McCurtain, 1848–1910), Principal Chief of the Choctaw Nation
- Liam Mac Curtain an Dúna, (1658–1724), Irish poet and scholar
- Margaret MacCurtain (born 1929), Irish historian, writer and educator
- Seán McCurtin (1896–1982), Irish politician
- Tomás Mac Curtain (1884–1920), a Lord Mayor of Cork, Ireland

== Places ==
- McCurtain, Oklahoma, U.S
- McCurtain County, Oklahoma, U.S.

== See also ==
- Curtain (disambiguation)
- Curtin (surname)
- Irish name
