= Donnchadh Mac Cruitín =

Irish scribe

Donnchadh Mac Cruitín (fl. 1468) was an Irish scribe.

== Biography ==
A member of Clann Chruitín of Thuadhmhumhain (now mainly County Clare), Mac Cruitín's ("Donnchadh mhac Matha alias Dionisius Cyriton") name is found in marginalia of a Latin medical text, De Medicinis Libellus. He stated he was "scolaris in phisica apud Sotone in comit’ Kanc anno gratie, 1468" ('medical student at Sutton in the county of Kent in the year 1468'). At the end of the Libellus, another note by him reads "finit amen finit qui scripsit sit benedictus. Quod Dionisius Cyriton" ('He who wrote this is truly blessed. That is Dionisius Cyriton'). (McInerney, 2014, p. 21).

Luke McInerney, who has written on the origins and history of Clann Chruitín, stated "It is uncertain why he was working as a scribe there but he may have travelled to England to further his education." (McInterny 2014, p. 24).

Another part of the manuscript contains work by the mid-sixteenth century scribe, Conchubhar Mór Mac Cruitín, a member of the same lineage.

== See also ==
- Curtin (surname)
- Gilla Duibin Mac Cruitín, musician, died 1405.
- Aindrias Mac Cruitín, c. 1650 – c. 1738, poet.
- Aodh Buí Mac Cruitín, poet and soldier, 1680–1775.
- Seamus Mac Cruitín, poet, 1815–1870.
