= Hezekiah Holland =

Hezekiah Holland may refer to

- Hezekiah Holland (minister), 17th-century English clergyman
- Hezekiah Russel Holland (born 1936), United States federal judge
