= Toby Purcell =

Irish Williamite soldier

- Military career
- Allegiance: Kingdom of England
- Branch: British Army
- Rank: Colonel
- Commands: 23rd Regiment of Foot
- Conflicts: Williamite War in Ireland; Raid on Newry; Battle of the Boyne; Battle of Aughrim; Siege of Limerick

Colonel Toby Purcell or Tobias Purcell (fl. 1689–1711) was a British Army officer who served in the Williamite War in Ireland. He served in the forces of William of Orange during the conflict.

Purcell was in command of the garrison of Newry in 1689, when it was attacked by a Jacobite force led by the French General the Marquis de Boisseleau. Purcell was present at the Battle of the Boyne the following year. In 1691 he was appointed to the Colonelcy of the 23rd Foot, but had to resign due to ill health. He was made Governor of Cork in 1692.

After the war he petitioned King William for confirmation of lands awarded to him in County Tipperary. In 1698 he was made Governor of Duncannon Fort after the removal of Sir James Jeffreys, and held the position until 1711.

== Bibliography ==
- Childs, John. The Williamite War in Ireland, 1688-1691. Continuum, 2007.
- Glover, Michael & Riley, Jonathan. That Astonishing Infantry': The History of The Royal Welch Fusiliers 1689-2006. Pen and Sword, 2007.
