= List of vales in England and Wales =

This is a list of vales in England and Wales. Vales are typically, though not universally, broad valleys between areas of higher ground. They may contain one or multiple rivers.

- Vale of Belvoir (Nottinghamshire / Leicestershire / Lincolnshire)
- Vale of Berkeley (Gloucestershire)
- Blackmore Vale or (Blackmoor Vale) (Dorset)
- Vale of Catmose (Rutland)
- Vale of Clwyd (Welsh: Dyffryn Clwyd) (Denbighshire)
- Vale of Conwy (Welsh: Dyffryn Conwy) (Conwy)
- Dedham Vale (Essex / Suffolk)
- Vale of Eden (Cumbria)
- Vale of Evesham (Warwickshire / Worcestershire)
- Vale of Ffestiniog (Welsh: Dyffryn Maentwrog) (Gwynedd)
- Vale of Glamorgan (Welsh: Bro Morgannwg) (Glamorgan)
- Vale of Gloucester (Gloucestershire)
- Vale of Kent (Kent)
- Vale of Leadon (Gloucestershire /Herefordshire)
- Marshwood Vale (Dorset)
- Vale of Montgomery (Powys / Shropshire)
- Vale of Mowbray (Yorkshire)
- Vale of Neath (Welsh: Cwm Nedd) (Glamorgan)
- Vale of Pewsey (Wiltshire)
- Vale of Pickering (Yorkshire)
- Vale of Powis (Powys)
- Vale of Red Horse (Warwickshire)
- Vale of St Albans (Hertfordshire)
- Vale of Sussex (Sussex)
- Vale of Taunton (or Vale of Taunton Deane) (Somerset)
- Vale of Trent (Derbyshire / Staffordshire)
- Vale of Wardour (Wiltshire)
- Vale of White Horse (Oxfordshire)
- Vale of York (Yorkshire)
