= Aindrias Mac Cruitín =

Aindrias Mac Cruitín (c. 1650 – c.1738) was a Gaelic-Irish poet.

== Biography ==
A member of the Mac Cruitín bardic family, Aindrias was born at Moyglass, Milltown Malbay, County Clare, where he was educated and spent much of his life. He worked as a teacher and scribe, some dozen manuscripts in his hand surviving. He worked for a Dr. Brian Ó Lochlainn in 1727, and wrote a number of poems for the family.

In his old age, he wrote his best-known poem, on the subject of the passing of the old Gaelic order, and with it, his patrons and his livelihood.

He died in 1738, and was buried in his family burying-place in the churchyard of Kilfarboy, near Milltown Malbay in Clare.

== Family ==
Other members of his family included:

- Gilla Duibin Mac Cruitín, musician, died 1405.
- Donnchadh Mac Cruitín, scribe, fl. 1468.
- Aodh Buí Mac Cruitín, poet and soldier, 1680–1775.
- Seamus Mac Cruitín, poet, 1815–1870.
