= Sutton Valence =

Village in Kent, England

Coordinates: 51.213°N 0.593°E

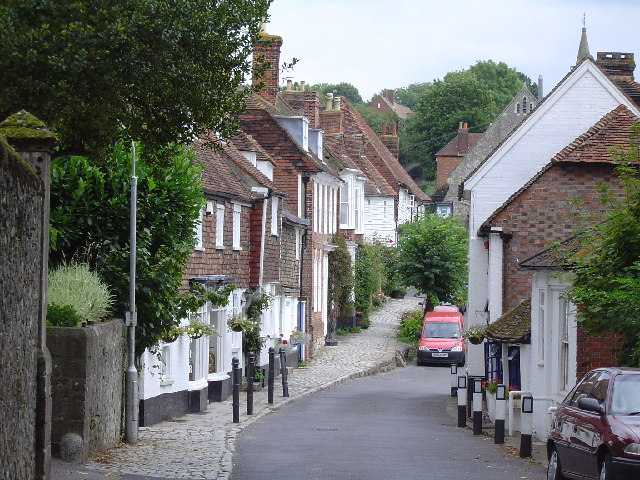
- Sutton Valence High Street looking East towards the Post Office

- Location within Kent
- Population: 1,665 2011 Census
- OS grid reference: TQ 812 492
- District: Maidstone
- Shire county: Kent
- Region: South East
- Country: England
- Sovereign state: United Kingdom
- Post town: Maidstone
- Postcode district: ME17
- Dialling code: 01622
- Police: Kent
- Fire: Kent
- Ambulance: South East Coast
- UK Parliament: Weald of Kent
- Website: Sutton Valence Parish Council

Sutton Valence (in the past also called Sudtone, Town Sutton and Sutton Hastings, see below) is a village about five miles (8 km) SE of Maidstone, Kent, England on the A274 road going south to Headcorn and Tenterden. It is on the Greensand Ridge overlooking the Vale of Kent and Weald. St Mary's Church is on the west side of the village on Chart Road, close to the junction of the High Street with the A274. Another landmark is Sutton Valence Castle on the east side of the village, of which only the ruins of the 12th-century keep remain, under the ownership of English Heritage.

== History ==
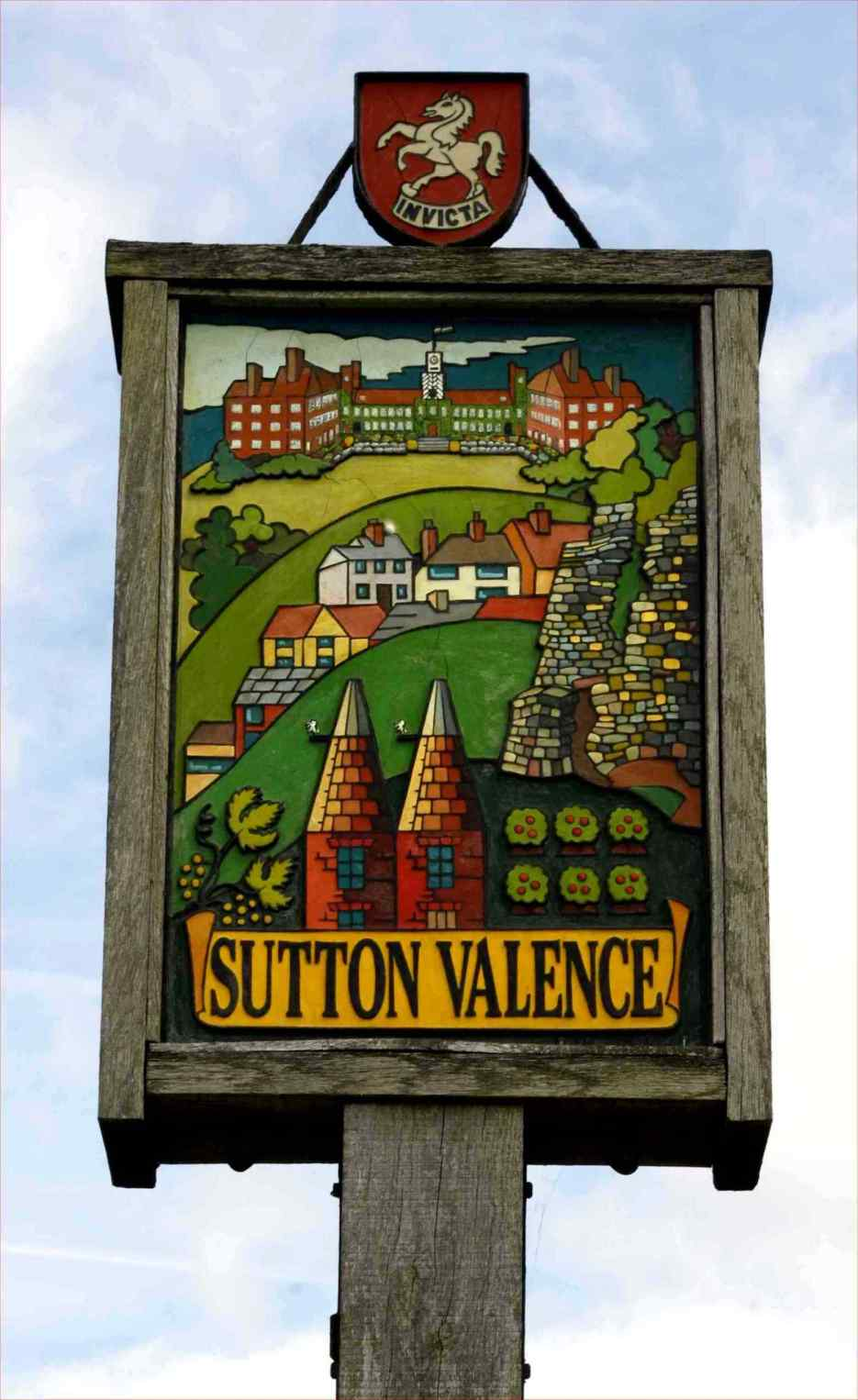
Sutton Valence road sign on the A274 showing the school, village, castle and oast houses

Iron Age and Roman artefacts have been found in the area. The Roman road from Maidstone to Ashford and Lympne passed through the village.

=== Saxon era – Before the Battle of Hastings ===
The earliest mention of a settlement at Sutton Valence was in 814, when Coenwulf mentioned Suinothe in a charter. Before the Battle of Hastings in 1066, the manor was owned by Leofwine Godwinson, brother of Harold who was to become King of England in 1066 and be defeated by William the Conqueror.

=== After 1066 ===
In 1086 the village is recorded in the Domesday Book under the name of Sudtone (South Town, or Sutton), granted to Adam FitzHubert who held it from Odo Bishop of Bayeux, the half-brother of William the Conqueror. Domesday also records a Church of St. Mary in Sudtone, which may have been built of wood in about 1070. The manor was then granted to the Count of Aumale, Baldwin of Bethune, who built a castle, the remains of its keep or tower can be seen on the east side of the village.

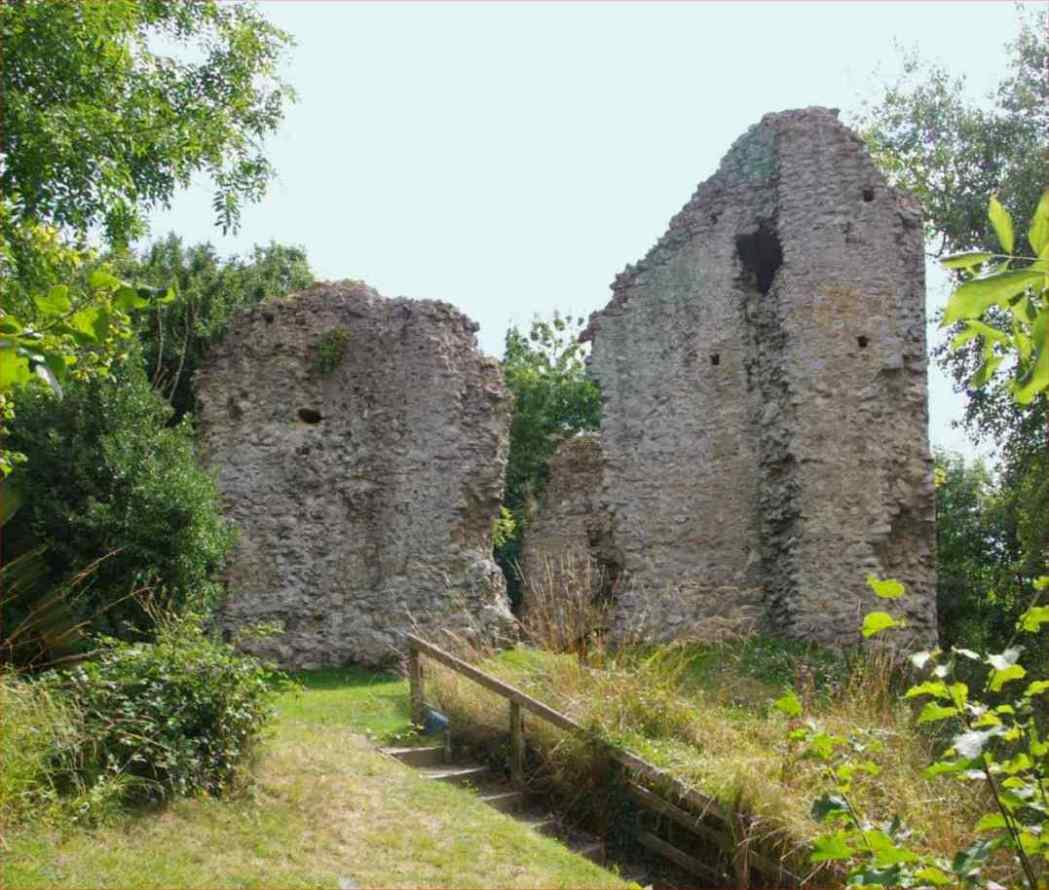
Sutton Valence Castle Keep – remains in 2014

In 1212 Baldwin died and the manor passed to his daughter Alice. She married William Marshal the son of the Earl of Pembroke, the manor passing to him on her death in 1215 (the date of Magna Carta). At that time, William Marshal's father was perhaps the most important noble in the land after the King and on the death of King John, became Protector of the young king Henry III and Regent of the Realm.

In 1221 a Royal charter was granted by Henry III allowing the village to hold a fair annually. William Marshal's son William the second earl then married Eleanor, daughter of King John and sister of his son Henry III (Eleanor was a child bride, aged nine). After the death of the Second Earl, she married Simon de Montfort, who rebelled at the lax rule of Henry III, won the Battle of Lewes but was killed at the Battle of Evesham in 1265, his estates being confiscated by the Crown.

In 1265 after the Battle of Evesham Henry III gave the manor and castle to his half-brother William de Valence, as a reward for his support during the de Montfort rebellion. The village of Sutton then became known as Sutton Valence after the town in France where William de Valence was born. Some of the de Valence Household Accounts have survived and show that the family often travelled between their estates. In 1296–7, Joan de Valence (William’s wife) stayed at eight different residences, including a month at Sutton Valence. In 1307 William's son, Aymer de Valence, 2nd Earl of Pembroke inherited the manor and according to the Household Accounts, stayed at Sutton Valence in June 1315. In the mid-14th century the manor passed to the Hastings family and became known as Sutton Hastings.

St Mary's Church

In the 14th century, the church was rebuilt using the local ragstone a grey limestone, possibly quarried in Boughton Monchelsea between Sutton Valence and Maidstone

=== 15th–16th centuries ===
In 1401, the manor was one of those sold to provide a ransom for the release of Baron Grey of Ruthin who had been captured by Owain Glyndŵr the Welsh leader who rebelled against King Henry IV and is mentioned in the Shakespeare play of that name. In 1418 the manor passed to the Clifford family. In 1548 the manor was sold to the Filmer family, who retained ownership until the early 20th century.

St Mary's Church.

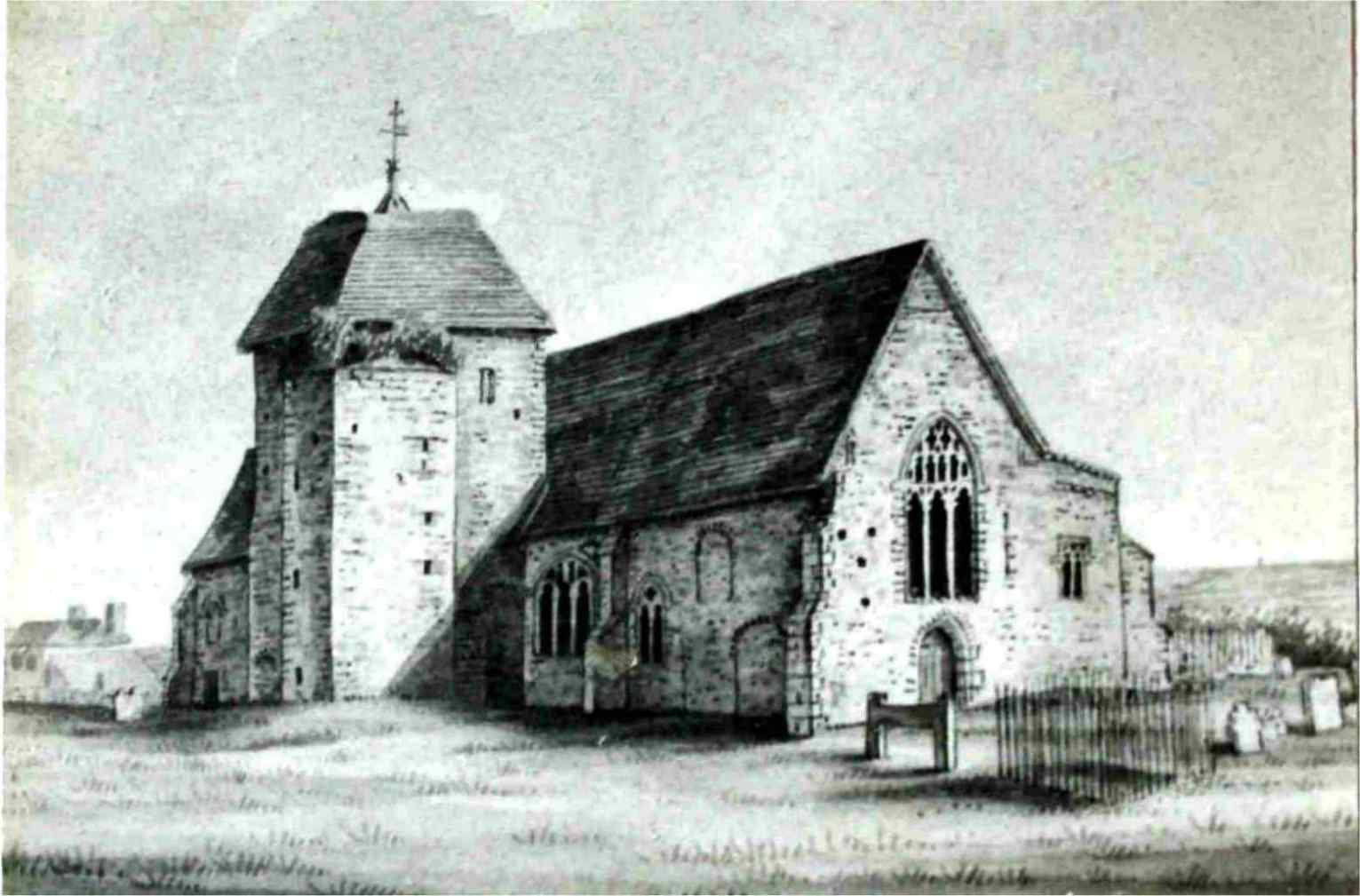
Sutton Valence Church in the 18th century

A William Lambe was baptised at St Mary's in the late 15th century and died in 1522. His will dated 1 July 1522 asked that his remains be placed in the church. In the SE corner of the church was a chapel dedicated to Saint Peter, which then became the Lambe Chapel. His grandson, also William, was a Citizen of the City of London and a member of the Worshipful Company of Clothworkers. He was a gentleman of the chapel to King Henry VIII and reputed to be a friend of the King. He clearly had wealth because later, in 1578, at "his own proper costs and charges", he built a free grammar school in the village, allowing the Master £20 per year with "a good house and garden to reside in", and a person called "the Usher" was allowed £10 per year.

Village Alms Houses.

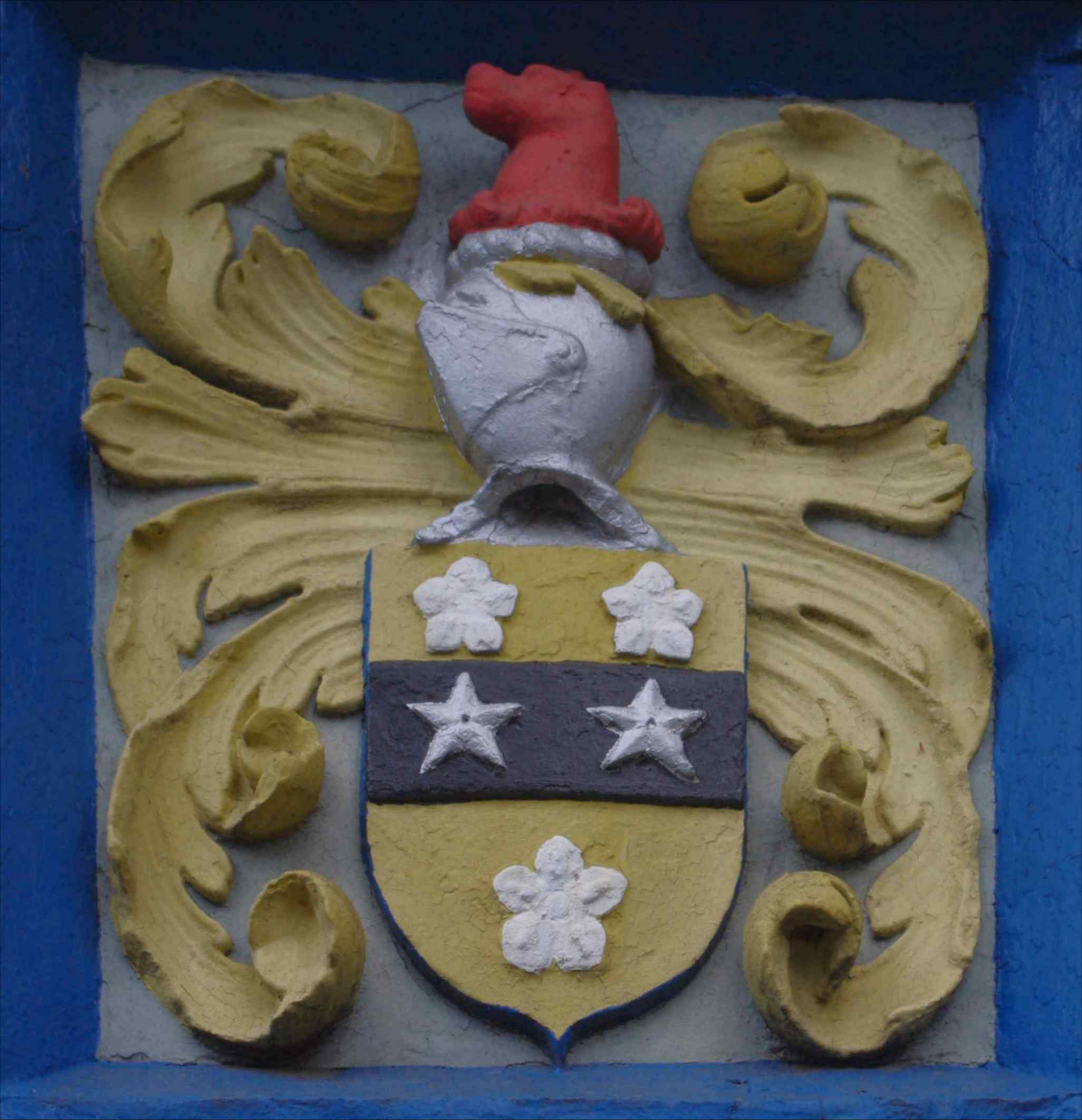
Crest on the Alms Houses

William Lambe also founded six alms-houses in the village with an orchard and gardens for the poor of the parish. He allotted £10 to be divided among them yearly, and entrusted the Company of Clothworkers with the management of this charity. The inhabitants were usually appointed by the master of the school. The arms of the founder, a "fess between three cinquefoils", are carved in stone on the front of the alms-houses.

=== 18th and 19th centuries ===
The Filmer family lent money for the construction of the turnpike road from Maidstone to Tenterden (the current A274). When gas became available and replaced candles and oil lamps, the Filmers encouraged the provision of a gas supply in the village. Many of the older buildings in the village are constructed from "ragstone" which was quarried locally at Boughton Monchelsea between the village and Maidstone.

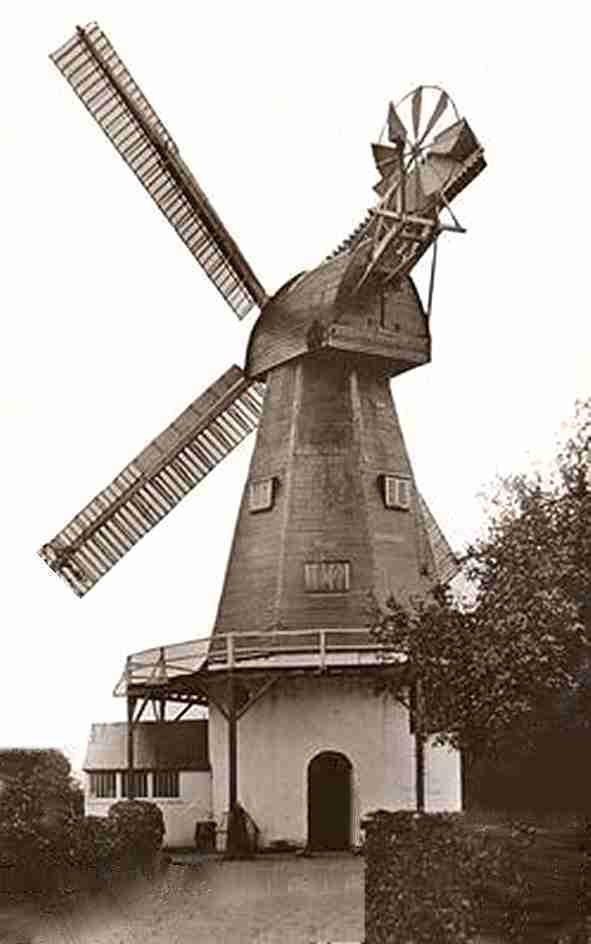
Sutton Valence Town Mill in the 19th century

=== Local windmills ===
The Sutton Valence Town Mill was a smock mill built about 1720.

In 1796 it was rebuilt and raised a storey following gale damage in which the cap and sails were blown off.

In 1918 it was again damaged in a gale, and was worked into the 1930s by an engine rather than its sails.

In 1945 it was demolished, leaving the base standing. An additional weatherboarded storey was added to the base and it was converted into a house.

Another windmill also stood at Five Wents to the north of Sutton Valence, but was demolished by 1875.

=== St Mary's Church ===
In 1825 an earlier church was rebuilt, the Worshipful Company of Clothworkers contributing the sum of £20 towards the rebuilding.

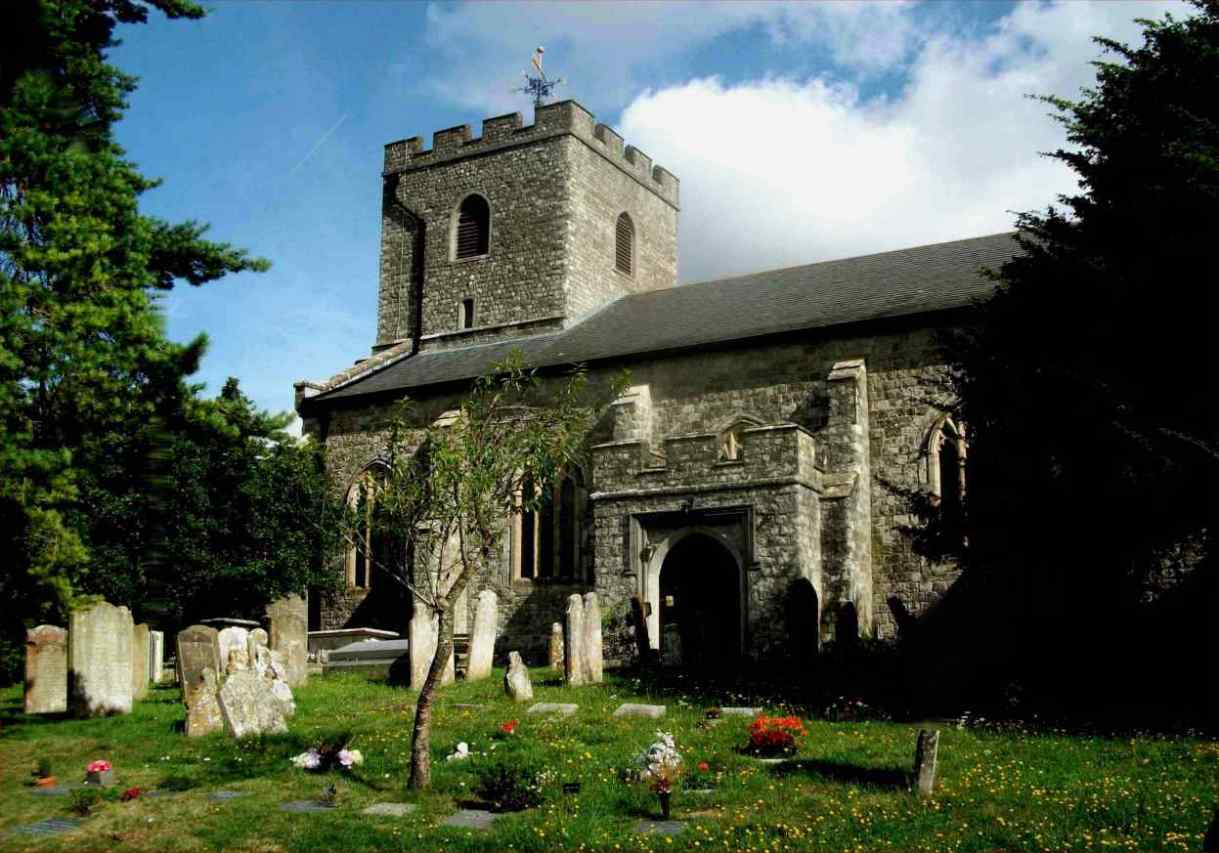
St Mary's Church today

1827 - the Clothworkers Company gave £20 towards a gallery at the west end, in the front of which the pupils of the grammar school had seats.

1866 - the Clothworkers contributed £10 towards a memorial window at the east end in memory of Rev. F. Walter.

1872 - the Clothworkers gave £21 towards an organ on the north side of the chancel.

1874 - the Clothworkers gave what was called at the time a "munificent sum" of 300 guineas towards further alterations.

=== World War I and after ===
In 1916 the Filmer family connection with Sutton Valence ended when Robert Filmer was killed in France.

Following his death, property in Sutton Valence was sold at auction.

The Filmer family kept East Sutton Park until 1939.

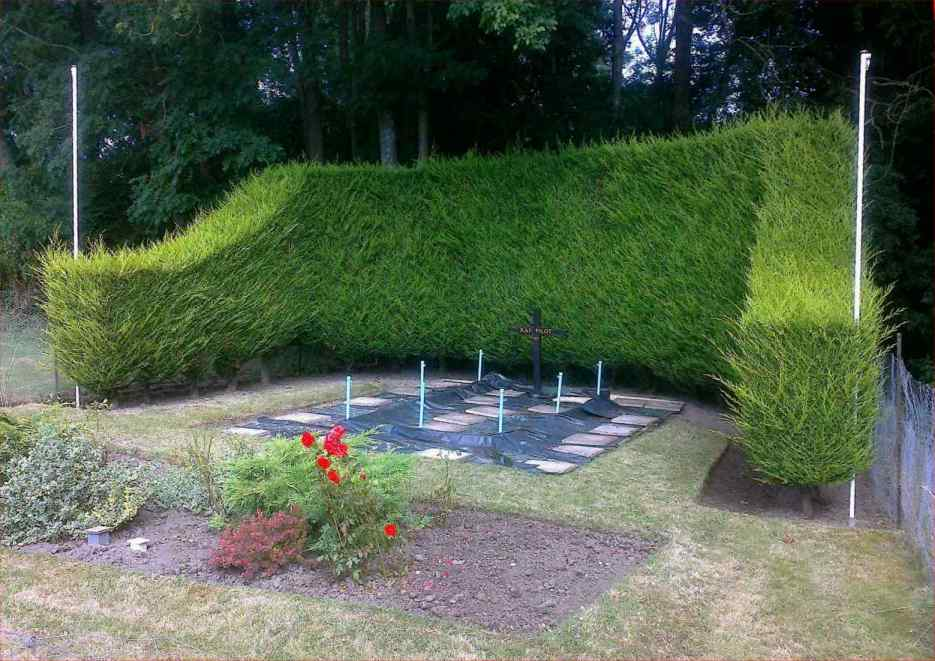
Pilot Officer Shaw memorial south of Chart Road, taken in 2014

=== World War 2 ===
During the Second World War the residents of Watts' Almshouses, Rochester were evacuated to a Georgian house in the village called Eylesden.

Pilot Officer Shaw memorial

On 3 September 1940 at the height of the Battle of Britain, Hurricane aircraft P3782 flown by Pilot Officer Robert Henry Shaw crashed just south of Chart Road at Parkhouse Farm, killing the pilot, and there is a memorial at the edge of the field at the crash site.

== Topography ==
The 100m contour (328 ft) passes E-W along the N side of Chart Road, along the West part of the Village High Street and East to the remains of the Castle tower. The ground rises to the North and the School sports ground to the East of the A274 is 125 m (410 ft) AMSL (Above Mean Sea Level). The ground falls steeply to the South, and the part of the Village called The Harbour is about 40 m (131 ft) AMSL. At the South end of Sutton Valence CP at Bardingley and the River Beult, the altitude falls to 16 m (52 ft) AMSL.

== Transport links ==
Sutton Valence lies on the A274 road from Maidstone south to Headcorn and Tenterden and is linked by bus to each.

The nearest railway station to the village is Headcorn, on the South Eastern Main Line to the Kent Coast and the Channel Tunnel via Ashford, and to London via Staplehurst, Paddock Wood and Tonbridge. Headcorn to London Bridge station takes about one hour and to Charing Cross, one hour and 10 minutes.

In 1904 Colonel Holman Stephens proposed the construction of an extension of the Kent & East Sussex Railway line from Headcorn to Maidstone via Sutton Valence, but World War I intervened and it was never built.

== The Civil Parish ==
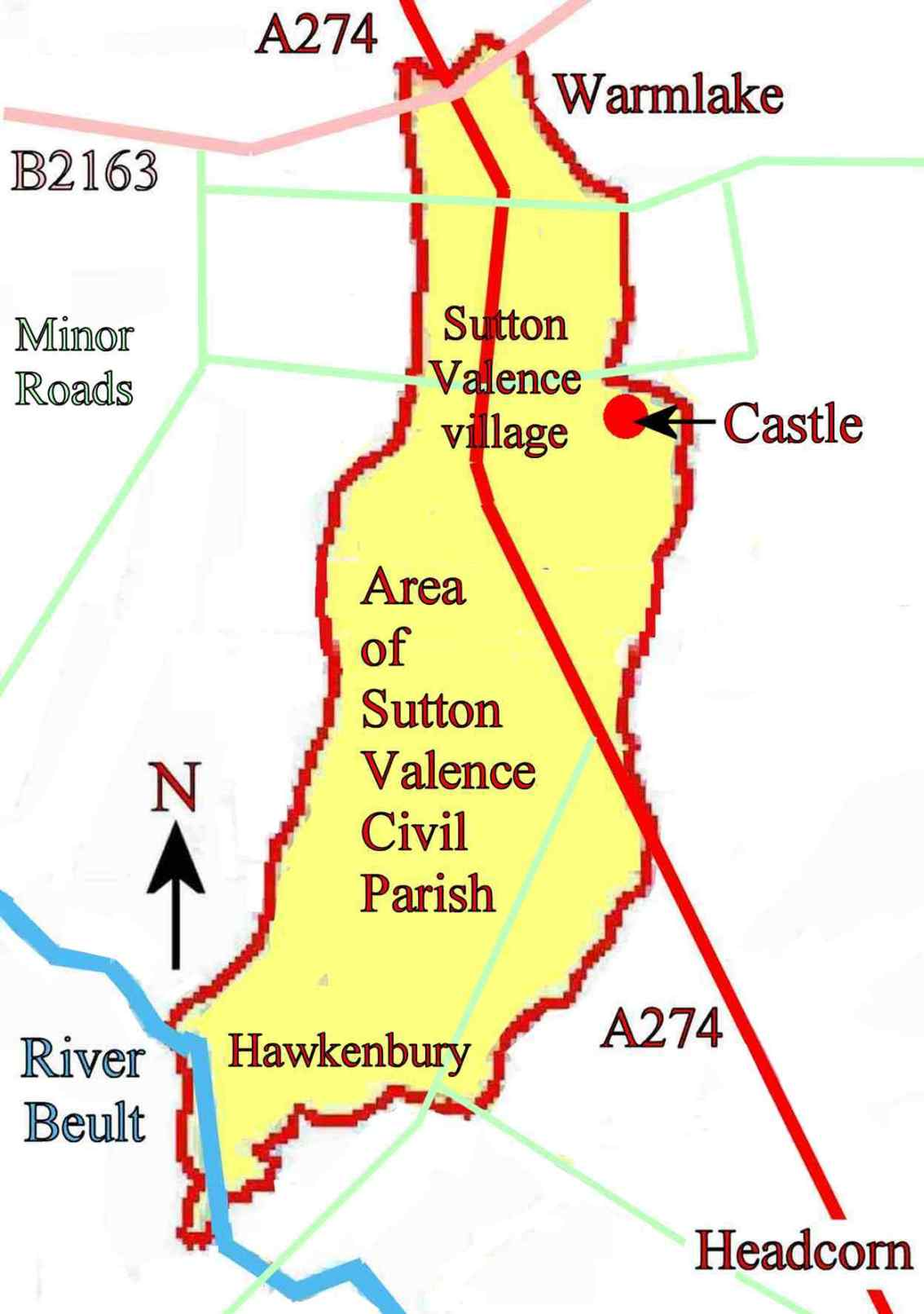
Sutton Valence Civil Parish area

The Sutton Valence Civil Parish (CP) has an area of 859 Hectares. Its width varies between 1 and 2 km from East to West, and is about 6 km from North to South. A diagram is on the left, and the exact boundary is shown by a dotted black line on the Ordnance Survey 1:25,000 map.

=== Sutton Valence CP features ===
As well as the Village itself to the East of the A274, the CP includes, to the North, Warmlake and the S side of Five Wents; to the West, about 400m along Chart Road; to the East, the Castle and Stallance; to the South, Farthing Green, Babylon Lane and Bardingley down to the River Beult.

=== Surrounding CPs ===
To the West is Chart Sutton CP; to the South, Headcorn CP; to the East, E Sutton CP; to the NE. Broomfield and Kingswood CP; and to the NW, Langley CP.

== Local features ==
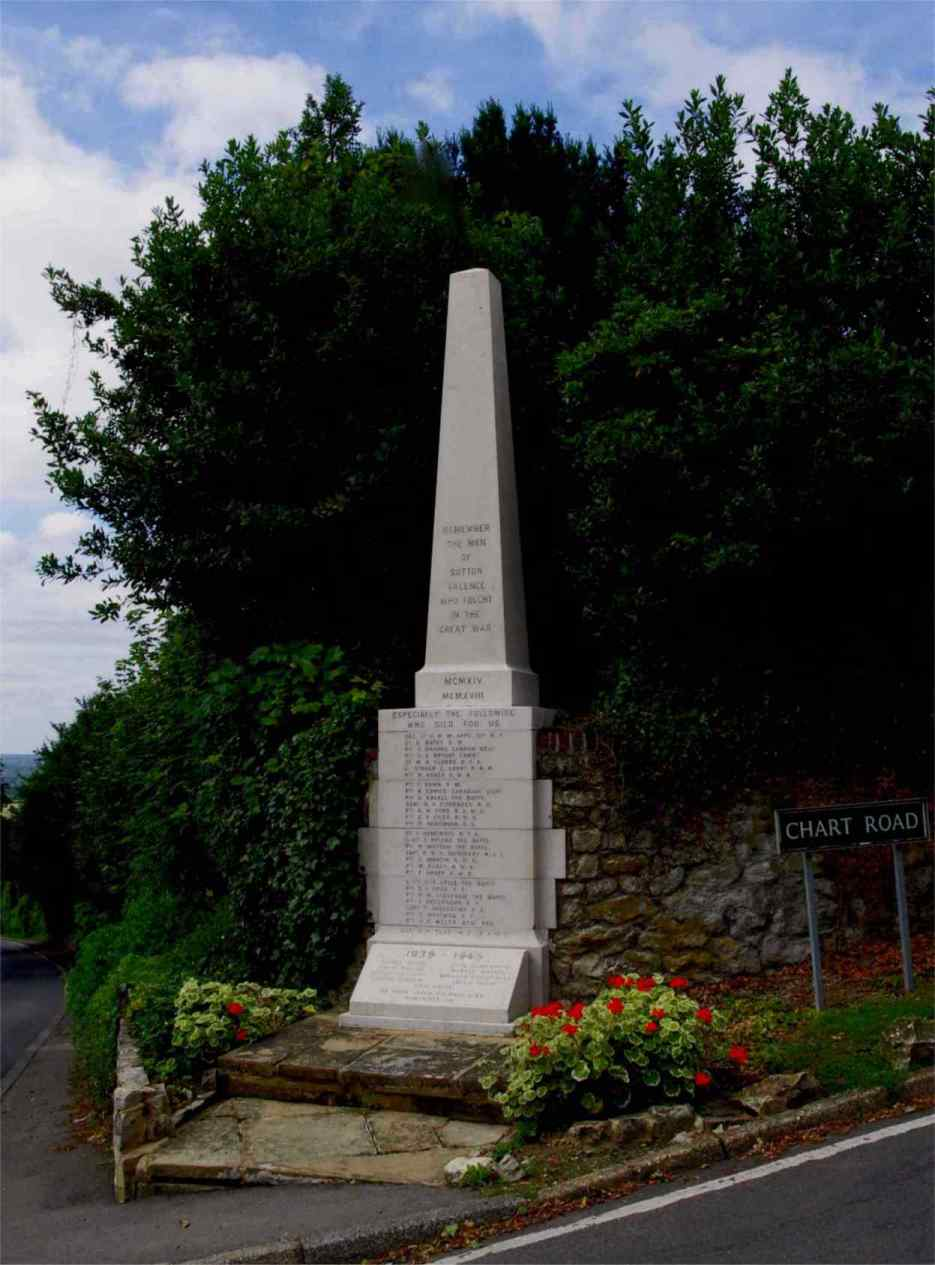
Sutton Valence War Memorial

Sutton Valence can be split into two parts. The principal and older part is at the top of the Greensand Ridge overlooking the Vale of Kent, the area known as "The Harbour" is to the South at the bottom of the hill, and many houses here were originally owned by the local authority.

The village has a garage on the A274, a school, post office, some shops and two working pubs. There is also a recreation ground next to the village hall.

War memorial

The village war memorial is on the SW side of the junction of the A274 with Chart Road and The High Street. It lists 29 soldiers from the First World War, two each from three of the same families. For World War II, nine soldiers are listed.

== Education ==
Sutton Valence School, a leading independent school, is located in the north-west part of the village but also owns Art and Design Technology departments in the centre of the village. There is also Sutton Valence Primary School, which is nearby.

== Sport ==
The school provides a venue for individual sporting activities. Sutton Valence Hockey Club play their home matches at Sutton Valence School. Sutton Valence Village is a local football club. There is also a golf club.

== Sutton Valence Castle ==
The site of the 13th-century castle is on the east side of the modern village and the ruined keep can be visited today. See the separate Wiki entry for Sutton Valence Castle.

== Notable people ==
- Donnchadh Mac Cruitín, Irish scribe, fl. 1468.
- Hezekiah Holland, 17th-century Puritan rector of Sutton Valence.
- Sir Edmund Filmer, 1835–1886, MP for West Kent, JP, Sheriff of Kent, Grenadier Guards.

== See also ==
- Listed buildings in Sutton Valence

== Sources ==
- Clark, F C (1947). Kentish Fire. Rye: Adams & Son.
- Coles Finch, William (1933). Watermills and Windmills. London: C W Daniel Company.
- Godber, Joyce (1978). The Story of Bedford. Luton: White Crescent Press. ISBN 0-900804-24-6.
- Hinkley, E.J.F. (1979), A History of the Richard Watts Charity, Rochester: Richard Watts and the City of Rochester Almshouse Charities, ISBN 0-905418-76-X Note: limited edition of 200 copies, a copy is available from Medway libraries.
- West, Jenny (1973). The Windmills of Kent. London: Charles Skilton. ISBN 0284-98534-1.
