= Eachmilidh Mac Artáin =

Irish noble, 16th century

Eachmilidh Mac Artáin, also called McCartin, and 'Acholie McCartan'), was head of the Mac Artáin lineage and Lord of Kinelarty in what is now County Down. He is first mentioned in an English account of 1575. Along with other Ulster lords he made a nominal submission to Queen Elizabeth I in 1576, through the person of Sir John Perrot.

== Participation in the Nine-Year War ==
Mac Artáin initially appeared to be hesitant to engage in growing tension between the native Gaelic gentry and the English colonial lords. However, by 1595, he joined with the growing resistance in Ulster and submitted to Hugh O'Neill, Earl of Tyrone, to resist the military forces of the English crown. His lands in Dufferin area were confiscated by English forces under Capt. Nicholas Malby as consequence for his support for the Earl of Tyrone. As the war progressed Mac Artáin appears to have been on active campaign with the confederate forces, destroying lands in Munster that were in the possession of the Earl of Kildare. During this period he took the Constable of Down, the Constable of Ardglass, Rowland Bethal, and Patrick Bedlow as hostages. Among his associates on the campaign were Sorley Boy McDonnell and Owen McHugh McNeil Oge. Mac Artáin is recorded as having been present at the Battle of Kinsale in 1601, where the confederate forces and their Spanish allies were soundly defeated. His fate hereafter is unknown, although he is mentioned in a state inquisition in 1609.

== Descendants ==
The wife of Eachmilidh is unknown to history as marriage records are rare from this period. However the name of five sons has come down to the present:

- Phellim macEachmilidh (Philomen), who later became chief of the name, and sold the lands in Co. Down to the Forde family.
- Antoin macEachmilidh (Anthony)
- Eoghan macEachmilidh (John), captured at the Battle of Kinsale
- Padraig macEachmilidh (Patrick)
- Donnchad Oge macEachmilidh (Donough the Younger)

Since the Mac Artáin lineage was defeated with the other confederate forces at the Battle of Kinsale by George Carew, Lord-President of Munster, they were forced to take refuge outside of the confines of County Down. Many of Eachmilidh's descendants appear to have become Wild Geese, serving in the Irish Brigades of the Spanish and French armies for the next century. His descendants include: Cynthia Roche, Theophilus Macartan, Anne de Gaulle, Frances Shand Kydd, Jo Berry, Maurice Roche, Charles DeGaulle, Diana Spencer, Lady Jane Fellowes, Edmond Roche, Cornelius Curtain, Cynthia Cary Van Pelt Russell, William Mountbatten, Green McCurtain, Florimond-Benjamin MacCurtain, Frank Forde, Jean de Gaulle, Oliver Platt, Karen McCurtain-Blair, Charles Spencer, Colm Feore, William Curtain, William Brownlow Forde, Thomas Robins, Evan Thomas, Edmond Roche, James Roche, Lady Sarah McCorquodale, Philippe de Gaulle, Michael McCartan, Henry Mountbatten, Charles de Gaulle II, Ryan McCartan, Shay McCartan, Edward McCartan, Arthur Guinness, and Mathew Forde.
