= Sutton Valence Castle =

Castle in Sutton Valence, Kent, England

- Kent
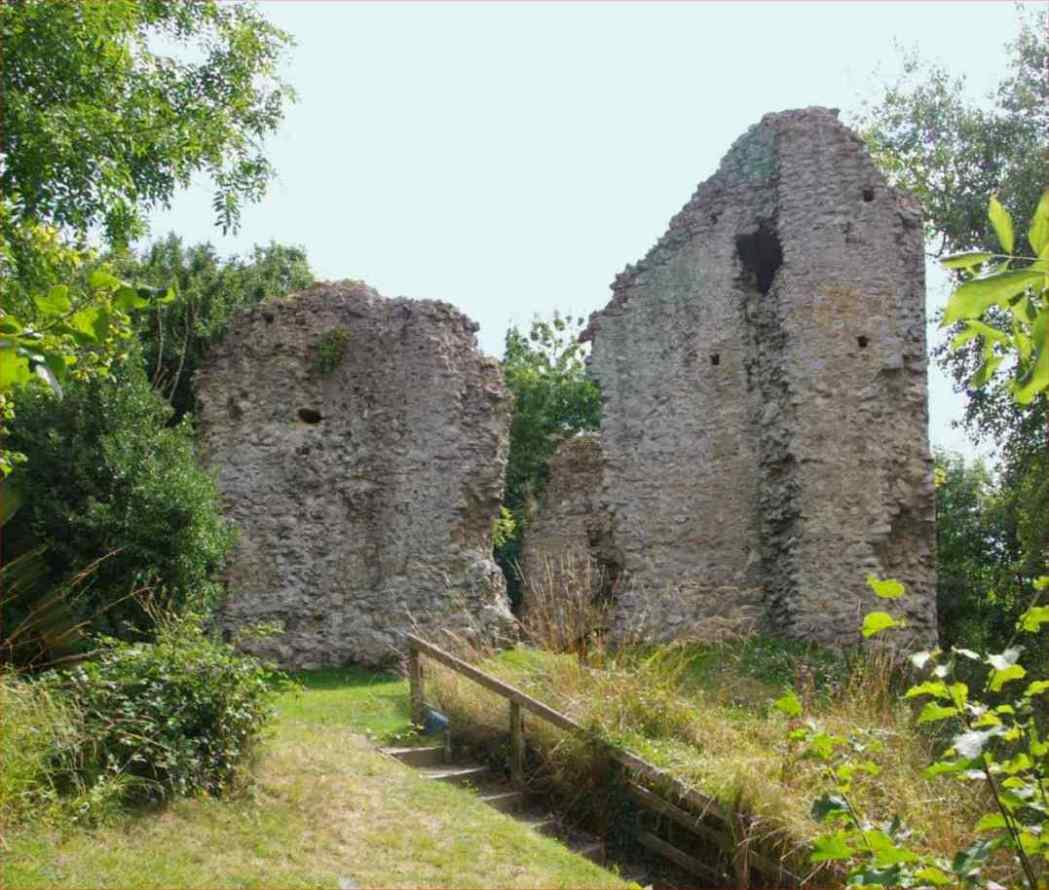
- The ruined keep of the castle

Site information
- Owner: English Heritage
- Open to the public: Yes
- Condition: Ruined

Location
- Coordinates: 51°12′45″N 0°35′52″E grid reference TQ815491

Site history
- Built: 12th century
- Materials: Ragstone and flint rubble

Sutton Valence Castle is a ruined medieval fortification in the village of Sutton Valence in Kent, England. Overlooking a strategic route to the coast, the original castle probably comprised an inner and an outer bailey and a protective barbican, with a three-storey high keep on its southern side.

It was built in the second half of the 12th century, probably by Baldwin of Bethune, the Count of Aumale. It then passed to the families of Marshal and de Montfort, before being given by King Henry III to his half-brother William de Valence in 1265, from whom the castle takes its current name. It was abandoned in the early 14th century and fell into ruin. Today, the castle is managed by English Heritage, and the remains of the keep are open to the public.

== 12th – 15th centuries ==
Sutton Valence Castle was probably built in the second half of the 12th century by the Counts of Aumale, most likely by Baldwin of Bethune, but perhaps by William le Gros, Baldwin's father-in-law.

The castle was built on a commanding position overlooking the strategic route between the towns of Maidstone, Rye and Old Winchelsea and the location was also known as Sudtone and Town Sutton.

The castle keep was constructed around 1200.

In 1203, Baldwin gave the castle to his daughter Alicia on her marriage to William Marshal, the Earl of Pembroke, who later remarried, passing the property to his second wife, Eleanor. After William's death, Eleanor married Simon de Montfort, the Earl of Leicester. Simon led a rebellion against King Henry III during the Second Barons' War, but was killed at the Battle of Evesham in 1265, after which Eleanor lost ownership of the castle.

After the de Montfort rebellion, King Henry III gave the castle to William de Valence, his half-brother, who had supported him during the conflict. Under William, the castle and village acquired its current name of Sutton Valence. Aymer de Valence, his son, inherited the castle in 1307. The Valences travelled around their estates, increasingly focusing their attention on a handful of their various great houses, and stayed at Sutton Valence on at least several occasions.

After Aymer's death in 1324, the castle passed by marriage to Lawrence, Lord Hastings, and was held in the Hastings family until 1390, when Reginald Lord Grey de Ruthin acquired it. There are few historical records of the castle beyond this point, but it appears to have been abandoned in the early 14th century and by the 15th century had become ruined.

== Architecture - Layout of the Castle Area ==
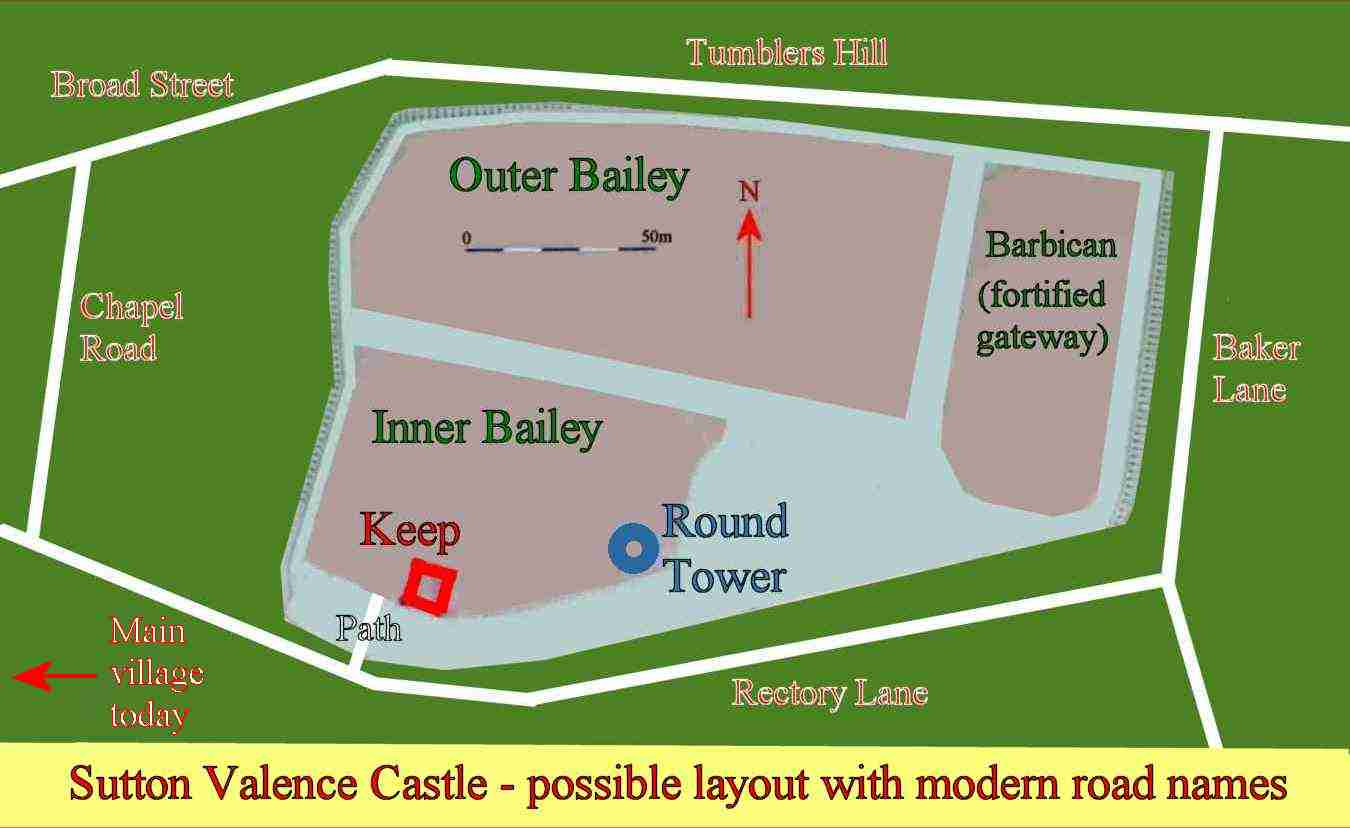
Sutton Valence Castle sketch map

Sutton Valence Castle is on a spur of the Chart Hills on the east side of the village of Sutton Valence.

It probably comprised an inner, an outer bailey and a protective barbican, see the diagram.

Access would have been through the eastern barbican, coming to an outer bailey, but these features only survive today as earthworks.

A dry ditch protected the inner bailey, which was approximately 300 by 34 metres (984 by 112 ft) across, on the southern side of the site.

The site probably included a hall, chapel and kitchen, but of the original buildings only the castle keep now survives.

The keep on the South side of the site is 11 metres (36 ft) square, with walls 2.4 metres (7 ft 10 in) thick, built from ragstone and flint rubble and surviving up to 7 metres (23 ft) high. It was originally 20 metres (66 ft) tall, with at least three storeys, and entered through an external staircase leading to a doorway in the first floor. The building had a corner tower, in which was a spiral staircase linking the floors, and had clasping buttresses at the corners.

== 16th – 21st centuries ==
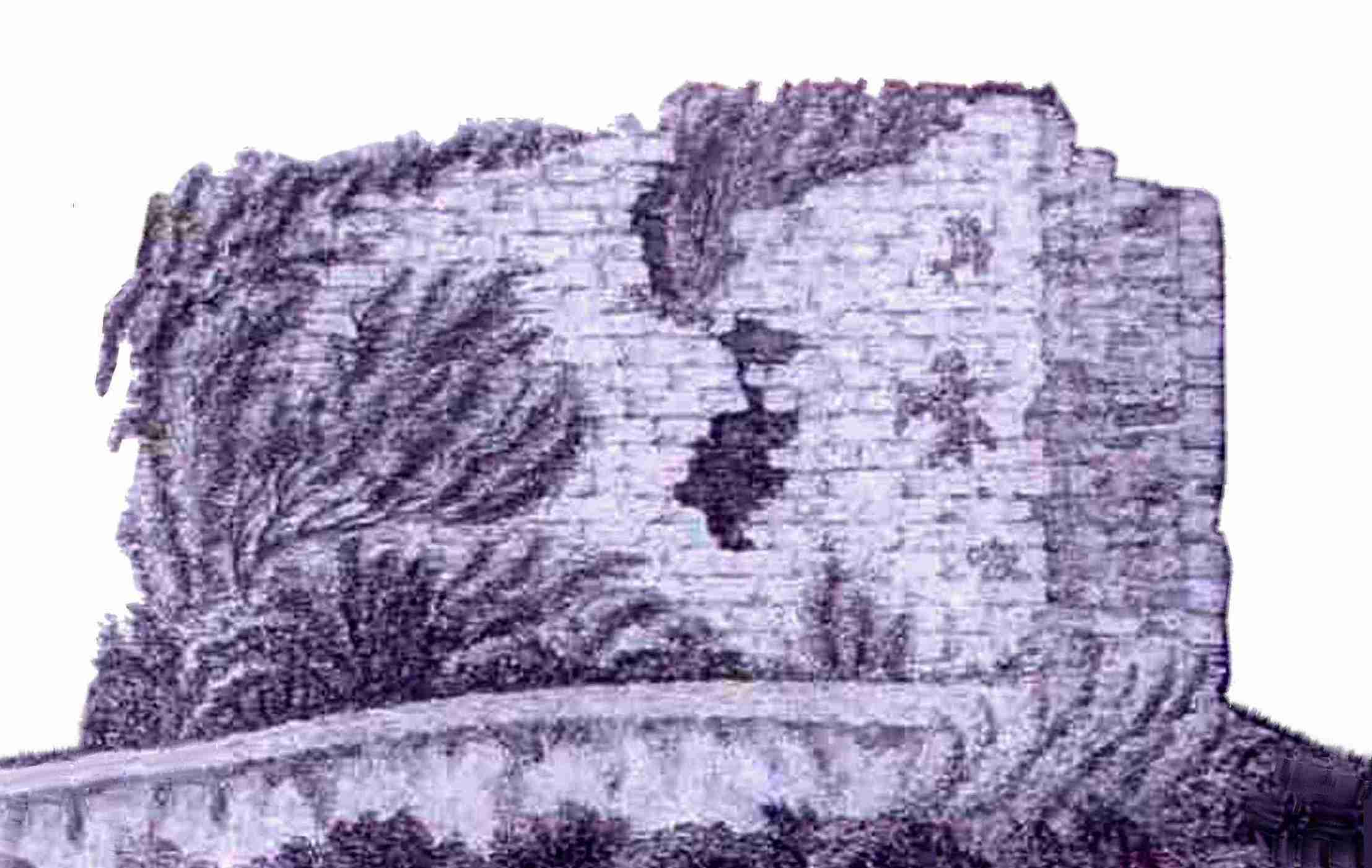
Sutton Valence castle keep in 1778

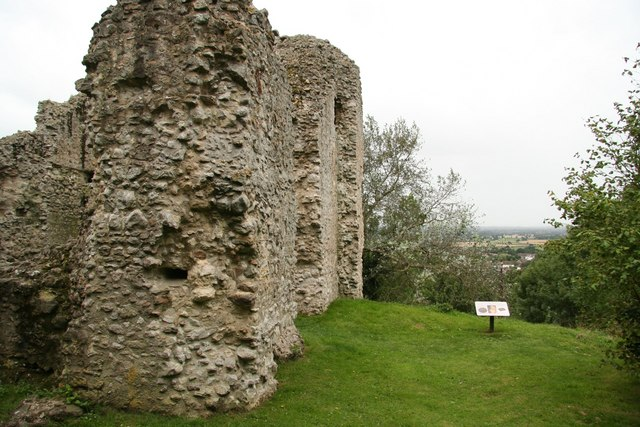
Remains of the ragstone and flint rubble keep today

The historian Edward Hasted (1732-1812) in his "History and Topographical Survey of the County of Kent" described Sutton Valence Castle as being "now almost covered with ivy, and the branches of the trees which sprout out from the walls of it." See the drawing on the right from Halstead's History.

Archaeological excavations were carried out at the site during the mid-1950s with the assistance of Maidstone Museum and the local Sutton Valence School, concentrating on the area of the castle keep.

The castle was placed in the guardianship of the state in 1976 and it is now owned by English Heritage.

Conservation work was done on the ruins in the 1980s.

It is protected under UK law as a Grade II listed building and a Scheduled Monument.

== See also ==
- Castles in Great Britain and Ireland
- List of castles in England

== Bibliography ==
- Emery, Anthony (2006). Greater Medieval Houses of England and Wales, 1300–1500: Volume 3, Southern England. Cambridge, UK: Cambridge University Press. ISBN 9781139449199.
- Grove, L. R. A. (1957). "Sutton Valence". Archaeologia Cantiana. 71: 227–228.
- Pettifer, Adrian (1995). English Castles: A Guide by Counties. Woodbridge, UK: Boydell Press. ISBN 9780851157825.
- Sands, Harold (1902). "Sutton Valence Castle". Archaeologia Cantiana. 25: 198–206.
- Sands, Harold (1907). "Some Kentish Castles". In Ditchfield, P. H.; Clinch, George (eds.). Memorials of Old Kent. London, UK: Bemrose and Sons. pp. 150–214.
