= Listed buildings in Sutton Valence =

Civil Parish in Kent, England

Sutton Valence is a village and civil parish in the Borough of Maidstone of Kent, England It contains 59 grade II listed buildings that are recorded in the National Heritage List for England.

This list is based on the information retrieved online from Historic England.

== Key ==
Grade	Criteria
I	Buildings that are of exceptional interest
II*	Particularly important buildings of more than special interest
II	Buildings that are of special interest

== Listing ==
Name	Grade	Location	Type	Completed (Note: The date given is the date used by Historic England as significant for the initial building or that of an important part in the structure's description.)	Date designated	Grid ref. (Note: The grid reference is based on the British national grid reference system, sometimes known as OSGB36, used by the Ordnance Survey.) Geo-coordinates	Notes	Entry number (Note: The "List Entry Number" is a unique number assigned to each listed building and scheduled monument by Historic England.)	Image	Wikidata
Babylon Farmhouse	II	Babylon Lane			11 August 1977	TQ8027746012; 51°11′06″N 0°34′41″E		1356575	Upload Photo	Q26639216
Bardingley Farmhouse	II	Babylon Lane			26 April 1968	TQ7992845529; 51°10′50″N 0°34′23″E		1060900	Upload Photo	Q26314049
Lower Farm House	II	Babylon Lane			18 December 1985	TQ8019146858; 51°11′33″N 0°34′38″E		1067804	Upload Photo	Q26320599
Viney Farmhouse and Barn Attached	II	Babylon Lane			26 April 1968	TQ8075246304; 51°11′15″N 0°35′06″E		1060899	Upload Photo	Q26314048
Aylmer House and House Adjoining to Left	II	Broad Street			26 April 1968	TQ8145449245; 51°12′49″N 0°35′48″E		1344325	Upload Photo	Q26628058
Barn About 5 Metres South of Valence House	II	Broad Street			18 December 1985	TQ8139349192; 51°12′47″N 0°35′45″E		1342738	Upload Photo	Q26626682
Cheyne House the Cheynes	II	Broad Street			26 April 1968	TQ8142649216; 51°12′48″N 0°35′46″E		1344298	Upload Photo	Q26628033
Lady Mor the Old Bakery	II	Broad Street			26 April 1968	TQ8139649235; 51°12′49″N 0°35′45″E		1060901	Upload Photo	Q26314050
Linden House	II	Broad Street			26 April 1968	TQ8136749233; 51°12′49″N 0°35′43″E		1344296	Upload Photo	Q26628031
Parish Council Offices the Post Office	II	Broad Street			26 April 1968	TQ8144049242; 51°12′49″N 0°35′47″E		1356587	Upload Photo	Q26639227
Raised Pavement Between the Old Bakery (broad Street) and Main Entrance to Lambes House (high Street)	II	Broad Street			18 December 1985	TQ8134949228; 51°12′48″N 0°35′42″E		1060902	Upload Photo	Q26314051
The Swan Public House	II	Broad Street			20 October 1952	TQ8141349240; 51°12′49″N 0°35′46″E		1356585	The Swan Public House More images	Q26639225
The White House	II	Broad Street			26 April 1968	TQ8137949235; 51°12′49″N 0°35′44″E		1356590	Upload Photo	Q26639230
Valence House	II	Broad Street			20 October 1952	TQ8140049210; 51°12′48″N 0°35′45″E		1060903	Upload Photo	Q26314052
Waggs Cottage	II	Broad Street			18 December 1985	TQ8142649248; 51°12′49″N 0°35′46″E		1344297	Upload Photo	Q26628032
Jasmine Cottage	II	Chapel Road			10 June 1983	TQ8143749196; 51°12′47″N 0°35′47″E		1344299	Upload Photo	Q26628034
Laurel Cottage	II	Chapel Road			18 December 1985	TQ8143949211; 51°12′48″N 0°35′47″E		1051673	Upload Photo	Q26303516
Walnut Tree Cottage	II	1 2 and 3, Chapel Road			26 April 1968	TQ8145449165; 51°12′46″N 0°35′48″E		1060904	Upload Photo	Q26314053
Church of St Mary	II	Chart Road			26 April 1968	TQ8096949189; 51°12′48″N 0°35′23″E		1060905	Church of St Mary More images	Q26314054
Manor Farmhouse	II	Chart Road			18 December 1985	TQ8104149212; 51°12′48″N 0°35′26″E		1051680	Upload Photo	Q26303522
Table Tomb About 10 Metres South West of Church of St Mary	II	Chart Street			18 December 1985	TQ8097749173; 51°12′47″N 0°35′23″E		1060906	Upload Photo	Q26314055
Table Tomb About 28 Metres South of Church of St Mary	II	Chart Street			18 December 1985	TQ8097049154; 51°12′46″N 0°35′23″E		1052281	Upload Photo	Q26304074
Table Tomb to Elizabeth Crispe About 25 Metres South of Church of St Mary	II	Chart Street			18 December 1985	TQ8097549160; 51°12′47″N 0°35′23″E		1052319	Upload Photo	Q26304106
Forsham	II	Forsham Lane			26 April 1968	TQ8081748293; 51°12′19″N 0°35′13″E		1344300	Upload Photo	Q26628035
Sparks Hall	II	Forsham Lane			26 April 1968	TQ8055248332; 51°12′20″N 0°35′00″E		1052249	Upload Photo	Q26304044
Barn About 10 Metres South West of Brook House	II	Headcorn Road			18 December 1985	TQ8121448038; 51°12′10″N 0°35′33″E		1372285	Upload Photo	Q26653415
Belringham	II	Headcorn Road			18 December 1985	TQ8103849031; 51°12′42″N 0°35′26″E		1060908	Upload Photo	Q26314057
Brook House	II	Headcorn Road			26 April 1968	TQ8122148066; 51°12′11″N 0°35′34″E		1060909	Upload Photo	Q26314058
Gladwish House	II	Headcorn Road			18 December 1985	TQ8153447526; 51°11′53″N 0°35′49″E		1052253	Upload Photo	Q26304048
Hillside House	II	Headcorn Road			26 April 1968	TQ8109349183; 51°12′47″N 0°35′29″E		1052252	Upload Photo	Q26304047
Henikers	II	Heniker Lane			26 April 1968	TQ8155048212; 51°12′15″N 0°35′51″E		1344302	Upload Photo	Q26628037
Central Stores Sutton Dene	II	High Street			26 April 1968	TQ8134149232; 51°12′49″N 0°35′42″E		1367142	Upload Photo	Q26648665
The Queens Head Public House	II	High Street			18 December 1985	TQ8115349207; 51°12′48″N 0°35′32″E		1372286	The Queens Head Public House More images	Q26653416
Ye Old Poste House	II	High Street			26 April 1968	TQ8135049234; 51°12′49″N 0°35′42″E		1344303	Upload Photo	Q26628038
Appin Mor Old Place	II	Lower Road			23 March 1983	TQ8114849181; 51°12′47″N 0°35′32″E		1367117	Upload Photo	Q26648644
Candy Cottage Townwell Cottage	II	Lower Road			18 December 1985	TQ8124549180; 51°12′47″N 0°35′37″E		1060870	Upload Photo	Q26314020
Motto Cottages	II	1 and 2, Lower Road			18 December 1985	TQ8121349181; 51°12′47″N 0°35′35″E		1060911	Upload Photo	Q26314060
Valence Green Cottage	II	Lower Road			18 December 1985	TQ8126549179; 51°12′47″N 0°35′38″E		1060871	Upload Photo	Q26314021
Homewell House	II	Maidstone Road			18 December 1985	TQ8083450827; 51°13′41″N 0°35′19″E		1060874	Upload Photo	Q26314024
Sutton Valence School Block Erected 1910-1914	II	Maidstone Road			18 December 1985	TQ8123449348; 51°12′52″N 0°35′37″E		1060872	Upload Photo	Q26314022
Farthing Green Farmhouse	II	New Barn Road			26 April 1968	TQ8106146508; 51°11′21″N 0°35′23″E		1060878	Upload Photo	Q26314028
Forge Farmhouse	II	New Barn Road			18 December 1985	TQ8089645924; 51°11′02″N 0°35′13″E		1060876	Upload Photo	Q26314026
Greenways Farmhouse	II	New Barn Road			26 April 1968	TQ8113046441; 51°11′19″N 0°35′26″E		1060875	Upload Photo	Q26314025
Lake Farmhouse	II	New Barn Road			26 April 1968	TQ8127547232; 51°11′44″N 0°35′35″E		1060877	Upload Photo	Q26314027
New Barn Farmhouse	II	New Barn Road			18 December 1985	TQ8075545554; 51°10′50″N 0°35′05″E		1054088	Upload Photo	Q26305770
Heaven Cottage	II	North Street			20 October 1952	TQ8108249270; 51°12′50″N 0°35′29″E		1344323	Upload Photo	Q26628056
Oast House About 40 Metres North of Warmlake Farmhouse	II	North Street			5 April 1982	TQ8110650308; 51°13′24″N 0°35′32″E		1060879	Upload Photo	Q26314029
Osborne House	II	North Street			18 December 1985	TQ8117149764; 51°13′06″N 0°35′34″E		1054097	Upload Photo	Q26305778
Former Almshouses, Now Part of Sutton Valence School	II	Now Part Of Sutton Valence School, High Street			20 October 1952	TQ8126749218; 51°12′48″N 0°35′38″E		1060910	Upload Photo	Q26314059
Barn About 36 Metres East South East of Stallance	II	Rectory Lane			18 December 1985	TQ8189948792; 51°12′34″N 0°36′10″E		1344324	Upload Photo	Q26628057
Court House	II	Rectory Lane			26 April 1968	TQ8144549113; 51°12′45″N 0°35′47″E		1060880	Upload Photo	Q26314030
Ruins of Sutton Castle	II	Rectory Lane			18 December 1985	TQ8153549111; 51°12′44″N 0°35′52″E		1186956	Ruins of Sutton Castle More images	Q17677452
Stallance	II	Rectory Lane			26 April 1968	TQ8184248810; 51°12′34″N 0°36′07″E		1029823	Upload Photo	Q26281043
Sutton Place	II	Rectory Lane			26 April 1968	TQ8174248974; 51°12′40″N 0°36′02″E		1187119	Upload Photo	Q26482346
2 and 3, Tumblers Hill	II	2 and 3, Tumblers Hill			18 December 1985	TQ8149149252; 51°12′49″N 0°35′50″E		1060882	Upload Photo	Q26314032
4, Tumblers Hill	II	4, Tumblers Hill			18 December 1985	TQ8149849252; 51°12′49″N 0°35′50″E		1187155	Upload Photo	Q26482377
Cottage Adjoining to Right Gwyn Cottage Newlyn	II	Tumblers Hill			18 December 1985	TQ8148149253; 51°12′49″N 0°35′49″E		1060881	Upload Photo	Q26314031
Shirley House	II	Tumblers Hill			18 December 1985	TQ8150649235; 51°12′48″N 0°35′50″E		1344326	Upload Photo	Q26628059
Sun Cottages	II	Tumblers Hill			18 December 1985	TQ8146849250; 51°12′49″N 0°35′49″E		1187140	Upload Photo	Q26482364

== See also ==
- Grade I listed buildings in Kent
- Grade II* listed buildings in Kent

== Sources ==
- Newman, John (2012) [1969], Kent: West and the Weald, The Buildings of England, New Haven and London: Yale University Press, ISBN 978-0-300-18509-6
