= A274 road =

Road in Kent, England

A274

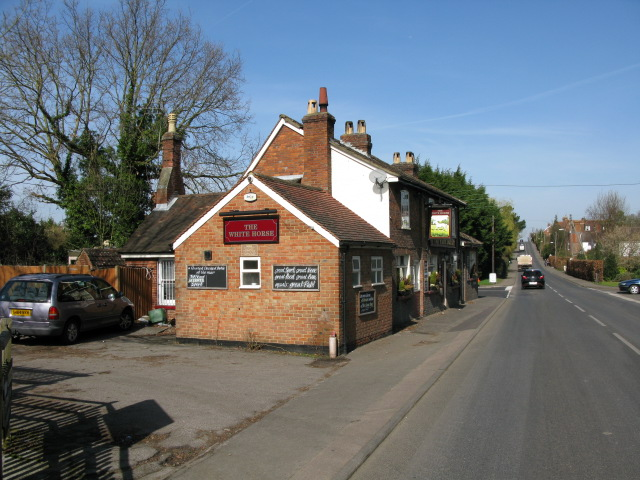
- The White Horse public house on the A274 through Headcorn

Route information
- Length: 12.37 mi (19.91 km)

Major junctions
- North end: Maidstone; 51.2578°N 0.53123°E
- A229 A262
- South end: Biddenden; 51.1149°N 0.6436°E

Location
- Country: United Kingdom
- Primary destinations: Langley; Sutton Valence; Headcorn

Road network
- Roads in the United Kingdom; Motorways; A and B road zones

The A274 is a major road running through mid Kent. The northern end of the road is in Maidstone, at the Wheatsheaf public house where it leaves the A229. The road then follows a south easterly route to Langley, where it changes to a south south easterly alignment through Sutton Valence and Headcorn, ending at a junction with the A262 in Biddenden. It is 12.37 miles (19.91 km) long.

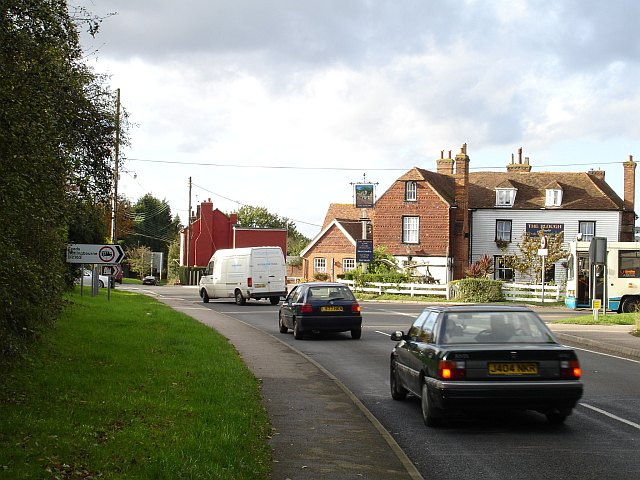
The B2163 crossing the A274 Sutton Road

The A274 was originally classified B2078 and was re-designated in the 1950s. The road has seen some upgrades to short sections at Park Wood (on the outskirts of Maidstone) and to the south of Sutton Valence.
