= Sinéad McCoole =

Irish, historian, writer, curator

- Born: 1968 (age 57–58); New York City, United States

Sinéad McCoole (born 1968) is an Irish historian, writer, curator, and expert in the history of Irish women from 1880 to the present day.

== Life ==
Sinéad McCoole was born in New York City to Irish parents in 1968. The family returned to Ireland in 1972, to live in Limerick. McCoole graduated from the University College Dublin (UCD) with a BA in History and History of Art in 1990, followed by a masters in Modern Irish History from UCD in 1992 with a thesis on Lady Lavery. She has cited Margaret Mac Curtain as a strong influence on her work. Her first book, Hazel: A Life of Lady Lavery 1880-1935, was published in 1996 and was well received.

Her work interviewing witnesses and gathering primary material relating to the women involved in the Easter Rising, the War of Independence, the Civil War and the early independent Irish State continued with her work curating of the Guns and Chiffon exhibition in Kilmainham Gaol from 1994 to the exhibition launch with her book of the same title in 1997. Her books often focus on the biographies of women from this period.

McCoole has curated a number of exhibitions in Ireland and the United States. Since 2012, McCoole has been a member of the Irish government's Expert Advisory Group on the Decade of Centenaries, and served as historical advisor for the 2016 National Commemoration Programme. She curated the programme and publication Mná 1916. She was a script writer for A Father's Letter a short film based on her interviews with Fr Joe Mallin and an RTÉ series of short films, Women of 1916. She was the curator of the Jackie Clarke Collection in Ballina having been involved in the assessment, care, and eventual exhibition of the archive from 2005.

She was awarded a D. Litt from the National University of Ireland in 2019.

== Selected publications ==
- Hazel, A Life of Lady Lavery (1996)
- Guns and Chiffon: Women Revolutionaries and Kilmainham Gaol 1916-1923 (1997)
- Hard Lessons: The Child Prisoners of Kilmainham Gaol (2001)
- No Ordinary Women: Irish Female Activists in the Revolutionary Years, 1900-1923 (2003)
- Easter Widows, the untold story of the wives of the executed leaders (2014)
- Women 1916-Mná 2016 (2017)
