= Charles Curtin =

English footballer

Personal information
- Date of birth: 1890
- Place of birth: Gateshead, England
- Date of death: 29 July 1967
- Place of death: Clapham, Bedfordshire, England
- Height: 5 ft 7 in (1.70 m)
- Position: Outside forward

Youth career
- Ryhope Villa

Senior career*
Years	Team	Apps	(Gls)
1911–1914	Norwich City		
1914–1915	Southampton	29	(5)
1919–1921	West Stanley		
1921–1926	Workington		
1926–1927	Caernarvon Athletic		
- * Club domestic league appearances and goals

Charles Curtin (1890 – 29 July 1967) was an English professional footballer who played at outside-forward for various clubs either side of the First World War.

== Football career ==
Curtin was born in Gateshead and started his football career in the village of Ryhope, before joining Norwich City of the Southern League in July 1911. After two seasons at The Nest, in April 1914 he moved to the south coast to join fellow Southern League team, Southampton.

He made his debut for the "Saints" in the penultimate match of the 1913–14 season, when he replaced Sid Kimpton in a 2–1 defeat at Northampton on 18 April. At the start of the next season, Kimpton had regained his place at outside-right, although Curtin replaced him for two matches in September, before taking over at No. 7 permanently at the end of October, with Kimpton switching to centre-forward.

Described as "a sturdily-built outside-right", Curtin was "exceptionally fast (and) could turn and leave many of his opponents floundering". During the 1914–15 season, his supply of dangerous and accurate crosses enabled Fred Jones, Kimpton and Arthur Dominy to become the chief marksmen in the Southern League.

In 1915, he left the club and after the First World War returned to his native north-east with West Stanley of the North Eastern League, before spells with Workington and Caernarvon Athletic.
