= Liam Mac Curtain an Dúna =

Irish poet and scholar (c. 1668 – 1724)

Liam Mac Curtain an Dúna, also rendered as 'Uilliam MacCurtain', William Curtain, Irish Gaelic: Mac Cairteáin an-Dúna or Liam an Dúna Mac Cairteáin, French: Gulielmus Curtain (c.1668-Nov. 1724) was an Irish poet and scholar. His works remain primarily in print in the Gaelic tongue.

== Life and work ==
While he was a member of the Macartan lineage from County Down, and descended from Eachmilidh Macartan, he is said to have been born in the town on Doon in County Cork. He was the son of Phelim Mac Curtain, an ensign in the army of King Charles II. However, which 'Doon' this is in Munster a matter of speculation, as it is a common prefix to Irish placenames.

Mac Curtain appears to descend from the Lords of Kinelarty and may have been of some means among the Gaelic gentry. During the Williamite Wars, he served in a Spanish cavalry regiment of King James II and the local MacCarthy or MacCartney lords in Desmond. He reputedly fought at the battle of Béal Átha Salainn (Six Mile Water, County Antrim in April 1691) a few miles from his ancestral home, where he led the men of his district in an ambush on a group of Williamite soldiers. When peace was concluded in the 1690s, he settled in the town of Dromboy, near Carrignavar in County Cork. There he assumed the position of schoolmaster, where he translated texts from Latin and Gaelic, and wrote poetry. Most of his works are dedicated to the Gaelic gentry which had recently become dispossessed of their land by the English crown. When Dermot Mac Carthaig died in 1705, Mac Curtain took his place as head of the bardic school, a post he held until his own death in 1724. Subsequent to his death, the school relocated to Blarney, further south in County Cork.

The bulk of Mac Curtain's work remains untranslated, but it is noted that he dedicated his prose to other members of the Gaelic intelligentsia who survived the Williamite persecutions. One work he dedicated to his close friend, John Baptist MacSleyne, titular Bishop of Cork. He went on to collect local legends which would be woven into James Macpherson's magnum opus, translated and compiling the famous works of Oisín in the early 18th century.

William Curtain died at Longstone, near Whitechurch, County Cork, where he was buried. He was brother to Conchobhar Mac Curtain and the nephew of Fr. Cornelius Curtain. He was survived by his children. Lesa Ní Mhunghaile relates that he had at least two sons and one daughter. One of these sons, Donall an Dúna Mac Cairteáin (fl. 1720s), reputedly received all his books after his death. William Curtain was succeeded at the bardic school by Liam Ruadh Mac Coitir. His grandson, John MacCurtain (Sean an Duna), appears to have continued that family ties to the bardic school, serving as a patron in the late 18th century.

== List of literary works ==
- Address to Sir James FitzEdmond Cotter (1700)
- A leabhair bhig trath do dhail dam sult ar fhiannaib’ (1701)
- The Lion of the province of Ulster (1703)
- Song of Grainne Mhaol (1703)
- Trí bhile den Mhumhain, trí túir, trí heaspoig, trí threóin
- Do-chuala sgata ban gur suigheadh fá mheidhir
- A Sheáin Uí Mhurchadha, bí fineamhail faobhrach
- Tá fáilte romhat, a Sheóin mhic Diarmada
- On Tentoring in Horseback
- A dhíograis mh’anma, a dhalta dhil, a uain ’s a stóir
- The horseman in the North of Doudhrim
