= Aodh Buí Mac Cruitín =

Aodh Buí Mac Cruitín (Irish pronunciation: /eː bˠi mˠakɾˠəˈtʲiːnʲ/; Classical Irish: Aodh Buidhe Mac Cruitín, English: Hugh MacCurtin) (1680–1755) was an Irish poet, tutor, and soldier.

== Biography ==
Mac Cruitín was a descendant of a bardic family of Thomond. Other members of his family included the musician, Gilla Duibin Mac Cruitín (died 1405), and the poets Aindrias Mac Cruitín (c.1650-c.1738) and Seamus Mac Cruitín (1815–1870). He lived about ten years in Dublin where he worked with Jonathan Swift on Irish sources for a history of Ireland and another ten years on the Continent, mostly at Louvain and Paris. While in Flanders he published an Irish grammar and joined Lord Clare's regiment of the Irish Brigade for a short time. In Paris he published an English-Irish dictionary in 1732 which included a poem by him which is the only example of a poem published in Irish in the Eighteenth-century. He returned to Ireland in 1738 where he taught in Limerick and then his native Clare, and established a school there. Both churchyards at Kilmacreehy and Kilvoydane have been identified as the place where he is buried

== Works ==
- "A Brief Discourse in Vindication of the Antiquity of Ireland" which tracks both real and mythological events in Irish history from the steppes of Scythia to the Norman Invasion.
- "The elements of the Irish language grammatically explained in English"
- "Ar phósadh Isibeal" (Poem)

== Legacy ==
- He is mentioned in the Leabhar Mumhaineach twice.
- T. F. O'Rahilly mentions him in "Notes on the Poets of Clare"

== See also ==
- Piaras Feiritéar
- Dáibhí Ó Bruadair
- Cathal Buí Mac Giolla Ghunna
- Aogán Ó Rathaille
- Séamas Dall Mac Cuarta
- Art Mac Cumhaigh
- Seán Clárach Mac Dónaill
- Eoghan Rua Ó Súilleabháin
- Curtin (Surname)
