= Lords of Kinelarty =

The Lords of Kinelarty were Gaelic gentry located in County Down, in Ireland, lasting until the Tudor conquest of Ireland. There does not appear to be any single list of the chieftains who held demesne over the region, as they are mentioned randomly in the ancient Irish annals. It is traditionally the tribal territory of the clan Macartan who dominated local political until the end of the 16th century.

Kinelarty derives its name from the Irish Cineál Fhaghartaigh, meaning Faghartach's (Fogarty's) kindred, which related to Foghatach macCartan, who reigned as one of the sovereigns over the area.

== Lords of Kinelarty ==
1. Cuonicon (11th century)
2. Muireartach (died 1011)
3. Dubhrail Macartan (died 1130)
4. Dermot Macartan (died 1165)
5. Cinead Macartan (died 1177)
6. Domnall 'Daniel' I Macartan (died 1242)
7. Eachmilidh I Macartan (died 1269)
8. Samhan 'John' I Macartan (circa 1320)
9. Evack Macartan (circa 1340)
10. Tomas Mor Macartan (died 1347)
11. Unnamed (died 1375)
12. John II Macartan (late 14th century)
13. Unnamed (died 1453)
14. Richard Macartan (late 15th century)
15. Daniel II Oge Macartan (died 1486)
16. Patrick I Macartan (died 1493)
17. Unnamed (died 1530)
18. Owen Macartan (mid-16th century)
19. Eachmilidh Macartan(late 16th century), great-great grandfather to Cornelius Curtain
20. Phelim I Macartan(died 1631)
21. James Macartan (died 1650)
22. Patrick II Macartan (died 1653)
23. John III Macartan Exiled to France 1691 after the Battle of the Boyne. Ancestor to French President Charles De Gaulle.
24. John IV Macartan (1640-1736)
25. Phelim II Macartan (1669-1751)
26. Dominick Macartan (1694-1772) who lost the last of his ancient familial holdings in 1768 to English colonial encroachment.
