= Conchobhar Mac Curtain =

Irish Royal Army captain (1660–1724)

Cornelius Curtain
- Tenure: 1680–1697
- Other names: Conchobhar Mac Curtain
- Known for: Military Service to Jacobite Cause
- Born: 1660; Mallow, County Cork, Ireland
- Died: 1 December 1724 (aged 63–64); Dublin Castle, County Dublin, Ireland
- Offices: Captain of Infantry Division in the Royal Army of King James II
- Spouse: Catherine O'Donovan

Cornelius Curtain (Irish Gaelic: Conchobhar Mac Curtain) (1660–1724) was a Captain of Infantrymen in the Royal Irish Army of King James II. English records do list him on two occasions as a "gentleman", meaning a landowner. He is listed as being present at the siege of Limerick, the Raid on Newry in County Down, as well as the king’s defeat at the Battle of the Boyne. Mac Curtain's rank is listed as "Captain", in the service of Major General Alexandre de Rainier de Droue, Marquis de Boisseleau’s Infantry division in 1690. His home township is listed twice, once as "Mellyforttown", and later as "Mallyfanstowne", both times this township is said to be in northern County Cork. The former rendering of the name appears to be an archaic phrasing of the township now known as Mallow. No historic record notes this township, so it is unclear. In a French record of his great-grandson, he is called Cornelius Curtain of Muckrooa, County Cork. However, this locale is not identifiable at all. Mac Curtain is listed as among those pardoned by William III and Mary II in 1690, and appeared to temporarily hold onto his landholdings. The English record does not specify if this pardon was requested, or just granted to the natives as means of reconciliation following the Williamite War. Whatever the case may be, the peace is short lived, as Mac Curtain had left Ireland with the Jacobite Army of 19,000 Irishmen under the Earl of Lucan in 1691. He appears to have returned in Ireland in 1696 during the Jacobite attempt to depose the Williamite government. For this, Mac Curtain was placed under royal attaint in 1696 (the state confiscation of his property and civil liberties).

He was the son of Phellim Curtain, an ensign in the army of Charles I, and brother to William Curtain and nephew to Fr. Cornelius Curtain, both Gaelic poets. He was also great-great grandson of Eachmilidh Macartan.

== Descendants ==
1st Marriage: - Catherine O’Donovan, daughter of Donal IV O'Donovan and Elizabeth Tonson,

1. Cornelius Curtain, who married Joanna Coppinger of Cork City in 1722, and was the ancestor of French MacCurtains, Including Cornelius MacCurtain, Sieur de Kainlis, Edmond Roche, 1st Baron Fermoy, as well as Florimond-Benjamin MacCurtain, Baron de Kainlis.
2. Mary Curtain
3. Gabriel Curtain,

2nd Marriage: - Joanne Quinn, daughter of Donough Quinn and Judith O'Riordan

1. John, had issue.
2. Simon Curtain, married Catherine Mansfield in 1718, had issue.
3. Hanora Curtain, married James MacMahon, had issue.
4. Anne Curtain,
5. Bartholomew Curtain, had issue.
6. Catherine Curtain,
7. William Curtain
