= Fred Jones (footballer, born 1888) =

English footballer

Personal information
- Full name: Frederick Jones
- Date of birth: 25 December 1888
- Place of birth: Newstead, Nottinghamshire, England
- Date of death: 14 August 1945 (aged 56)
- Place of death: Nottingham, England
- Height: 5 ft 10 in (1.78 m)
- Position: Inside forward

Youth career
- Annesley
- Sutton Junction

Senior career*
| Years | Team | Apps | (Gls) |
| 1907–1911 | Notts County | 66 | (24) |
| 1911–1912 | Coventry City | 37 | (21) |
| 1912–1913 | Notts County | 20 | (3) |
| 1913–1914 | Coventry City | 19 | (4) |
| 1914–1915 | Southampton | 31 | (13) |
| 1919–1920 | Coventry City | 1 | (0) |
| 1920–1921 | Wrexham | | |
| – | Pembroke Dock | | |
| – | Ebbw Vale | | |
- * Club domestic league appearances and goals

Frederick Jones (25 December 1888 – 14 August 1945) was an English professional footballer who played at inside-forward for various clubs in the 1900s and 1910s, spending most of his career with Notts County.

== Football career ==
Jones was born in Newstead, Nottinghamshire on Christmas Day 1888 and, after playing club football in the nearby villages of Annesley and Sutton-in-Ashfield, he joined Notts County in 1907.

He soon became a regular member of Notts County's First Division side, generally playing at inside-left and in the 1909–10 season he only missed two League matches as County finished ninth in the table, their best finish for nine years. In the following season, he lost his place to Sam Richards, and only made three further appearances.

Jones spent the 1911–12 season playing for Southern League Coventry City, before returning to Meadow Lane for a further year in the First Division, at the end of which Notts County were relegated to the Second Division. He then went back to Coventry City for a further season, before moving to the south coast in April 1914 to join Southampton, also in the Southern League.

Described as "a burly, bustling inside-left", Jones made his debut in the opening match of the 1914–15 season, scoring in a 3–3 draw against Luton Town. Jones soon formed a "potent partnership" with fellow forwards Sid Kimpton and Arthur Dominy, who was the leading scorer in the Southern League with 30 goals. In his one season with the "Saints", Jones made a total of 35 League and FA Cup appearances, scoring 14 goals.

His professional football career was halted by the First World War, after which Jones spent another season with Coventry City, now in the Football League Second Division. After making only one league appearance he played out his career with a trio of clubs in Wales, Wrexham, Pembroke Dock and Ebbw Vale.
