= Hezekiah Holland (minister) =

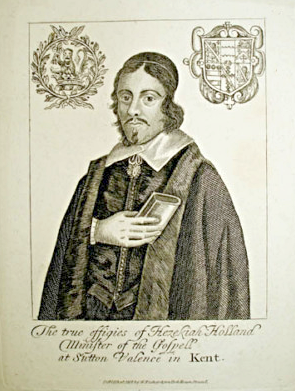
The true effigies of Hezekiah Holland, Minister of the Gospell at Sutton Valence in Kent

Hezekiah Holland (c. 1617 – after 1660) was an Anglo-Irish Anglican clergyman, tending towards Puritanism. He used the pen name Anglo-Hibernus.

Probably born in Ireland, in 1638 Holland graduated Bachelor of Arts at Trinity College, Dublin, as Ezekias Holland, and he migrated to England in about 1644. In March 1645, during the First English Civil War, Robert Smith, vicar of Sutton Valence in Kent, was deprived of his living, and Holland was appointed by Parliament to succeed him as minister of the parish. In July 1649, Holland wrote that he had arrived in England as "a stranger, (a kind of a banished man) out of Ireland... five years ago I came out of that Kingdom into this".

Before long, the General Baptists were gathering a large number of adherents in Kent, and Holland found that he needed to take part in religious controversy with George Hammon, preacher of Biddenden, one of the Baptist leaders.

In his work An exposition or, A short, but full, plaine, and perfect epitome of the most choice commentaries upon the Revelation of Saint John, published in 1650, Holland reckoned that the end of the World and the Day of Judgment were 216 years away. Despite its title, this work generally follows the commentary of the German theologian David Pareus (1548–1622), whose work on the Revelation of Saint John the Divine had been translated into English by Elias Arnold, but Holland relied also on the work of Saint Augustine, Thomas Brightman, and the Swiss reformer Heinrich Bullinger. George Hammon replied to Holland in Truth and Innocency, Prevailing against Error and Insolency (1660), a work which sought to defend the thnetopsychist view of humanity.

In Adam's Condition in Paradise Discovered (1656), Holland addressed his opponent Hammon, remarking "you have gotten into great repute with those who know not how to contradict you". Hammon, in a work dated 1660, refers to Holland as being still at Sutton Valence, but this was the year of the Restoration of the monarchy, after which no further traces of Holland have been found. His ultimate fate is unknown.

== Publications ==
- A Christian looking-glasse, or, A glimps of Christs unchangably everlasting love discovered in several sermons, in the parish-church of Sutton-Valence (Printed by T. R. & E. M. for George Calvert, at the Half-moon in Watling-street, neer Pauls stump, 1649)
- Anglo-Hibernus, An exposition or, A short, but full, plaine, and perfect epitome of the most choice commentaries upon the Revelation of Saint John (1650)
- Adam's Condition in Paradise Discovered Wherein Is Proved That Adam Had Right to Eternall Life, in Innocency, and Forfeited It, for Him and His (1656)
