= Raid on Newry =

Military operation in 1689 in Ireland

- Part of Williamite War in Ireland
Date	24 November 1689
Location	Newry, County Down, Ireland
Result	Williamite victory

Belligerents
Williamites	France; Jacobites

Commanders and leaders
Toby Purcell	(Kingdom of France) Marquis de Boisseleau

Strength
200+	1,700+

Casualties and losses
2 captains killed 3+ soldiers killed	1 Lieutenant Colonel killed 12 killed 12 wounded

The raid on Newry took place in November 1689 during the Williamite War in Ireland when a Franco-Irish force loyal to James II attacked the Williamite garrison of Newry in County Down. The raid was carried out by the French Major General Alexandre de Rainier de Droue, Marquis de Boisseleau a French officer serving with James' Irish Army. It was largely unsuccessful, and the Jacobite forces withdrew having suffered casualties.

== Background ==
After capturing Carrickfergus in August 1689 and advancing towards Dublin, the Williamite commander Marshal Schomberg had halted his army at Dundalk Camp during a stand-off with the Jacobite forces defending the capital. In November Schomberg dispersed his forces into winter quarters across Ulster.

As soon as Schomberg had withdrawn from Dundalk, the Jacobites issued orders to Boisseleau to lead a force to Newry with the intention of rolling up the various Williamite garrisons in the area. Boisseleau's force, which consisted of 1,700 infantry accompanied by six troops of cavalry and dragoons left on 23 November and reached the River Clanrye at dawn on 24 November. Colonel Toby Purcell the commander at Newry, had several companies of Sir Henry Ingoldsby infantry regiment as a garrison. Purcell had deployed his troops by sending detachments to various crossings and strongpoints in the area leaving him only sixty troops in Newry itself, twenty of whom were not fit for duty.

== Fight ==
Boisseleau sent a hundred men to the ford the Clanrye north of Newry Bridge as a diversion, while two hundred men attacked across Newry Bridge. They managed to kill the first sentry before he could sound the warning, but the second sentry was able to discharge his musket and alert the town. Purcell hastily assembled some of his troops in the market square, assisted by some of the local townsmen. The two Jacobite forces converged at the market square and a brisk fight began. Several of the sick members of the garrison joined in by firing muskets from their windows. The Jacobite soldiers became convinced that they were facing a much larger force than had previously been estimated and began to creep backwards. Although their officers tried to rally them, this quickly turned into a full-blown retreat with many men swimming across the Clanrye River.

Boisseleau tried to persuade the remainder of his force to advance across the bridge, they refused. Boisseleau was forced to abandon the operation and retreat southwards. He had lost a Lieutenant Colonel and around a dozen killed and wounded, as well as some prisoners. Williamite casualties were slightly less, although they had lost two Captains as they were coming out of their billets during the attack. Although some of the garrison made a half-hearted attempt to pursue the retreating Jacobites, this went no further than Newry Bridge.

== Aftermath ==
Following the raid Schomberg took a number of measures to secure Newry. Cavalry were sent to the area, the bridge over the Clanrye was demolished and an artillery battery set up to defend the ford which the Jacobites had used. Later in November reports were received that the Earl of Antrim's regiment at Dundalk were planning a fresh attack on Newry. Brigadier William Stewart led a Williamite force which defeated Antrim's men in the Moyry Pass, killing thirty and taking seventeen prisoners.

After the Duke of Berwick's defeat at the Battle of Cavan in February 1690, the policy of raids into Ulster was discontinued. The following summer the decisive Williamite victory at the Battle of the Boyne was won.

== Bibliography ==
- Childs, John. The Williamite Wars in Ireland. Bloomsbury Publishing, 2007. ISBN 978-1-84725-164-0
