= Margaret Mac Curtain =

Irish historian, writer, nun, and educator

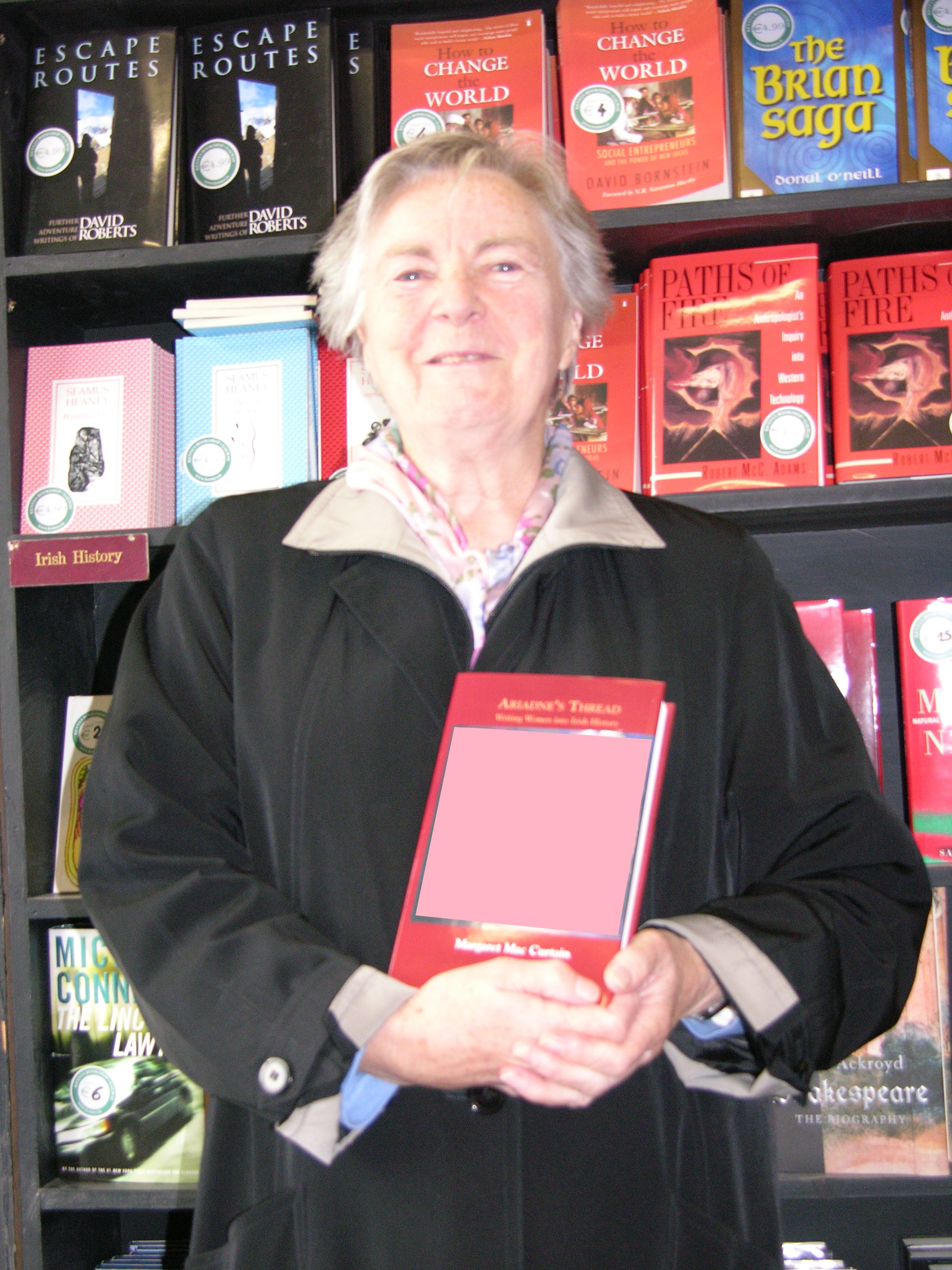

Margaret Mac Curtain (1929–2020) was a Dominican sister, Irish historian, writer, and educator.

== Career ==
Mac Curtain was a native of County Cork, Ireland. She was the daughter of Sean and Ann Mac Curtáin, who raised her in Cork City. She received her Bachelor of Arts degree in 1950 from University College Cork (UCC), where she won the Peel Prize and turned down an opportunity to study with J. R. R. Tolkien prior to joining the Dominican Order. She joined the teaching staff at Sion Hill, Blackrock and she held several positions including Prioress of Sion Hill Convent (1984–1989). In 1964, she earned a Ph.D. in history and was a lecturer in the Irish History Department of University College Dublin from 1964 to 1994. She was also a professor at the School of Irish Studies, Dublin, from 1972 to 1989. She held the Burns Chair of Irish Studies at Boston College from 1992 to 1993. She was awarded the Eire Society of Boston Gold Medal in 1993 for her writings on Irish women's history. When she initially became a nun she was given the name Sister Benvenuta but she restored her own name when rule changes allowed it.

Sr. Mac Curtain was the founding principal and helped establish the Senior College Ballyfermont.

Dr. Mac Curtain chaired the National Archives Advisory Council from 1997 to 2002. She also served on the academic council of the Irish School of Ecumenics.

Mac Curtain was active in political and social causes. She chaired the National Archives Advisory Council from 1997 to 2002 and contributed to the Treoir 2000 report on the state of the Irish language at the end of the 20th century.

Many Irish past students of UCD cite Mac Curtain as an influence on their work, including Sinéad McCoole and Cathal Mac Coille.

== Selected works ==
- The Birth of Modern Ireland (1969)
- Tudor and Stuart Ireland (1972)
- Women and Irish Society: The Historical Dimension (1978)
- The Gill History of Ireland series (1980)
- Women in Early Modern Ireland (1992)
- From Dublin to New Orleans: Nora and Alice's Journey to America 1888 (1995)
- Grace Gifford Plunkett and Irish Freedom (2000)
- Ariadne's Threads: Writing Women into Irish History (2009)
