= Seamus Mac Cruitín =

Seamus Mac Cruitín (1815-1 September 1870), was a 19th-century Irish poet and bard.

== Biography ==
Mac Cruitín was a native of County Clare, apparently the area of Ennistymon. He was a member of the same family as Aindrias Mac Cruitín and Aodh Buí Mac Cruitín. Seamus claimed he was sixth in line of descent from Sean, a brother of Aindrias. He is thought to have been the product of an irregular union between a Tadhg Mac Mac Cruitín and an unknown woman. The names of his siblings, if he had any, are unknown.

Associates included the scribe Michael O Raghallaigh; Brian O Luanaigh (1828–1901), later Professor of Irish at the Catholic University of Irish; John MacHale, Archbishop of Tuam; Eugene O'Curry; William Smith O'Brien.

Mac Cruitín had spent some time in County Kerry, and by his early 20s was working as a schoolmaster. His works included translations of Brian Merriman's The Midnight Court, collected songs and poems for Eugene O'Curry, translations and versions for O'Brien, in addition to composing original material.

After years of heavy drinking and bad health, Mac Cruitín's health broke down. He developed a severe illness which developed into rheumatic fever. He was brought to Ennistymon Workhouse, where he died on 1 September 1870. Mac Cruitín was buried in an unmarked grave in the paupers' plot of Ennistymon Workhouse. His death was not reported in the local papers. The official cause of death was cirrhosis of the liver.

== Notable works ==
- Is baoth an turas, written 12 May 1836, his earliest dated poem
- All hail young gentry, written for the O'Briens of Elmvale, Corofin, c. 1840
- Come over fair Monarch, published in the Limerick Reporter, March 1842, one of some thirty of his poems published in that newspaper between January 1841 and March 1847, at first signed "A Six Months Tutor", last as "McCurtin".
- A Chlanna Gael, elegy on Sir Michael O'Loughlen, Master of the Rolls, died November 1842
- Lines suggested on entering the R.C. cathedral of Tuam
- Ag cur slan le Gaeilge (Farewell to Irish)
- Air Uilliam Mhic an Ghabhan Ui Bhrian (On William Smith O'Brian, Esq., M.P.)
- Slan le Cluain an Atha (Farewell to Cloonanaha)
- Uadhacht Sheamuis Mhic Chruitin (the last will and testament of James McCurtin, apparently composed during his final illness
