= Vale of Kent =

Vale in Kent, England

Coordinates: 51°12′09″N 0°31′04″E

The Vale of Kent, located in Kent, England, is the name given to the broad clay vale between the Greensand Ridge and the High Weald. The area is drained by a number of rivers, including the Beult, Eden, Medway, Stour and River Teise.

Principal settlements in the Vale include Ashford and Tonbridge.

== Geology ==
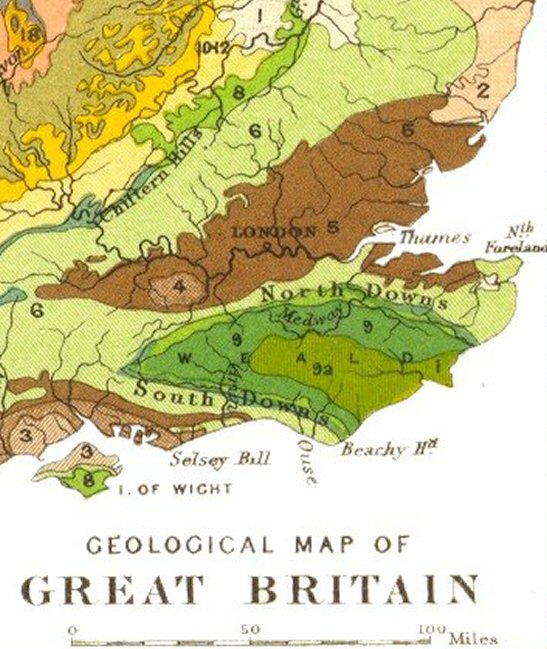
Geology of south-eastern England. The High Weald is in lime green (9a); the Low Weald, darker green (9). Chalk Downs, pale green (6)

Geological section from north to south: High and Low Weald shown as one

The Weald is the eroded remains of a geological structure, an anticline, a dome of layered Lower Cretaceous rocks cut through by erosion to expose the layers as sandstone ridges and clay valleys. The oldest rocks exposed at the centre of the anticline are correlated with the Purbeck Beds of the Upper Jurassic. Above these, the Cretaceous rocks, include the Wealden Group of alternating sands and clays - the Ashdown Sand, Wadhurst Clay, Tunbridge Wells Sand (collectively known as the Hastings Beds) and the Weald Clay. The Wealden Group is overlain by the Lower Greensand and the Gault Formation, consisting of the Gault Clay and the Upper Greensand.

The rocks of the central part of the anticline include hard sandstones, and these form hills now called the High Weald. The peripheral areas are mostly of softer sandstones and clays and these form the gentler rolling landscape of Low Weald, of which the Vale of Kent is a part. The Weald-Artois Anticline continues some 65 km (40 mi) further south-eastwards under the Straits of Dover, and includes the Boulonnais of France.
