= Alexandre de Rainier de Droue, Marquis de Boisseleau =

French aristocrat and soldier (1650–1698)

Alexandre de Rainier de Droué, Marquis de Boisseleau (1650 – 8 October 1698) was a French aristocrat and soldier. He is known for his service on the Jacobite side during the Williamite War in Ireland.

== Biography ==
Boisseleau received a commission in the French Royal Army and saw extensive service in the Franco-Dutch War. He was present at the Siege of Maastricht and Battle of Saint-Denis. He fought in the War of the Reunions, including at the Siege of Luxembourg.

He was one of many French soldiers sent to Ireland by Louis XIV to assist his cousin James II to keep hold of his Irish Crown. He fought alongside James' Irish Army, with the rank of major-general, in several military actions. In November 1689, Boisseleau led a Jacobite force in the unsuccessful Raid on Newry. The following summer he was present at the Battle of the Boyne. Although this was a major defeat for the Jacobite cause, his own reputation was enhanced due to his conduct on the battlefield.

The same year he was instrumental in the successful defence of Limerick during the first Siege of Limerick. When many of his fellow French officers and Irish commanders wanted to abandon Limerick which they considered indefensible, Boisseleau sided with a group of Irish and British Jacobites led by Patrick Sarsfield who felt that the town could still be held. Boisseleau was appointed Governor of Limerick by King James' representative in Ireland the Richard Talbot, 1st Earl of Tyrconnell.

Following the siege, he requested permission from his French commander, Antoine Nompar de Caumont, to leave Ireland. He subsequently served in the French army in the Nine Years' War, including at the Siege of Namur and the Battle of Landen. On 3 January 1696 he received the rank of maréchal de camp; he died two years later.

== Bibliography ==
- Childs, John. The Williamite Wars in Ireland. Bloomsbury Publishing, 2007.
- McNally, Michael. Battle of the Boyne 1690: The Irish Campaign for the English Crown. Osprey Publishing, 2005.
