= Florimond-Benjamin MacCurtain =

- Baron de Kainlis, Officer of the Legion of Honor
- Tenure: 1825-1857
- Known for: Military Service to the Bourbon Dynasty
- Born: July 29, 1764; Savennieres, Maine-et-Loire, France
- Died: 1857 (?); France
- Offices: Deputy of the Loire-Inferior, Commissioner of War- Kingdom of France
- Spouse: Marie Anne Aubin de l'Estang
- Parents: Cornelius MacCurtain; Victoire Le Tellier de Grandval

Florimond-Benjamin MacCurtain was a French politician and soldier who gained notoriety during the late 18th and early 19th century. He entered military services in the French Royal Army in 1781 at seventeen years of age. He was quickly granted the rank of ‘Commissioner of War’ within the Army, and elected deputy of the Loire-Inferior to the Council of Five Hundred. During the revolution he was sentenced to deportation because of his father's status as a knight and landowner, but was able to escape from this and join the Chouans. He campaigned for the royalists in Upper Brittany and Lower Anjou for some time. During the French Consulate, he was relieved of his duties and remained out of public affairs during the age and chaos of Napoleon. Following the restoration of the French monarchy he was permitted to rejoin the legitimist Army of Louis XVIII in 1814, and appointed military superintendent on October 4, 1820, an office which he held until his retirement on June 7, 1834. He was granted the Barony of Kainlis for his service to the French Crown, as well as the distinction of an ‘Officer of the Legion of Honor’.

== Irish ancestry ==
Florimond is the great-grandson of the Irish officer Cornelius Curtain, who was in the service of King James II, and was briefly posted in France during the infamous Flight of the Wild Geese.

== Ancestry ==
Ancestors of Florimond-Benjamin MacCurtain

Phellim MacCurteain
Cornelius Curtain
Cornelius MacCurtain
Donal IV O'Donovan
Catherine O'Donovan
Elizabeth Tonson
Cornelius MacCurtain, Sieur de Kainlis
James Coppinger
Joanna Coppinger
Anne Beamish
Florimond-Benjamin MacCurtain
Marie Anne Aubin de l'Estang
