= Cornelius Mac Curtain =

Catholic priest and Irish poet

Cornelius Mac Curtain (Irish: Concubar Mac Curtain; 1658–1737) was a Catholic priest and Irish poet, who composed several works in Latin, Irish, and English during the late 17th and early 18th century.

== Life ==
Mac Curtain's place of his birth is unknown. He was ordained in Cork in Ireland in 1684 by Pierce Creagh, the titular Bishop of Cork. He was the parish priest of Glanmire, residing at Coole, in County Cork. He was buried at Temple Loircte.
