= Gilla Duibin Mac Cruitín =

Irish musician (died 1405)

Gilla Duibin Mac Cruitín, Irish musician, died 1405.

The Annals of Ulster note his death:

U1405.1 Gilla-Duibin Mac Cruitin died this year, namely, the ollam of Ua Briain, to wit, one eminent in music and in history and in literary distinction in Ireland.

The use of the term ollamh distinguishes Mac Cruitín as the court musician for the then King of Thomond
