= List of national monuments in County Clare =

The Irish state has officially approved the following list of national monuments in County Clare. In the Republic of Ireland, a structure or site may be deemed to be a "national monument", and therefore worthy of state protection, if it is of national importance. If the land adjoining the monument is essential to protect it, this land may also be protected.

== National Monuments ==
NM#	Monument name	Description	Image	Townland	Location
11	Corcomroe Abbey	Abbey (Cistercian)466		Abbey West	53°07′37″N 9°03′14″W
648	Ballyallaban ringfort	Ringforts		Ballyallaban	53°05′24″N 9°09′31″W
574	Tau Cross (Cross Inneenboy)	Cross		Ballycashen, Roughan	52°58′40″N 9°06′53″W
484	Ballyhickey Wedge Tomb	Wedge Tomb		Ballyhickey	52°50′04″N 8°51′20″W
591	Brian Boru's Fort	Ringfort		Ballyvally	52°49′08″N 8°27′06″W
478	Bunratty Castle	Castle		Bunratty East	52°41′48″N 8°48′42″W
466	Caheraphuca Wedge Tomb	Wedge Tomb		Caheraphuca	52°56′05″N 8°54′18″W
354	Cahermacnaghten	Cashel		Cahermacnaghten	53°02′45″N 9°11′54″W
195	Canon Island Abbey	Abbey (Augustinian)		Canon Island	52°40′44″N 9°02′13″W
197	Clare Abbey	Abbey (Augustinian)		Clarecastle	52°49′44″N 8°58′08″W
583	Dromore Castle	Castle		Dromore (Ruan)	52°55′31″N 8°57′46″W
204	Drumcliff	Church & Round Tower		Drumcliff	52°52′04″N 8°59′51″W
170	Ennis Friary	Friary (Franciscan)		Ennis	52°50′45″N 8°58′53″W
509	Gleninagh Castle	Castle		Gleninagh North	53°08′16″N 9°12′21″W
14	Inchicronan Abbey	Abbey (Augustinian)		Inchicronan	52°55′05″N 8°54′24″W
5	Inishcaltra (Inis Cealtra)	Early Medieval Ecclesiastical Site		Mountshannon	52°54′53″N 8°27′01″W
7	Kilfenora	Church		Kilcarragh	52°59′23″N 9°13′23″W
9	Kilfenora Abbey	Friary (Franciscan)		Kilfenora	52°59′27″N 9°13′05″W
8	Kilfenora	Cathedral & Crosses		Kilfenora	52°59′26″N 9°13′01″W
279	St. Molua's Church	Church		Killaloe	52°48′25″N 8°26′40″W
448	Leamaneh Castle	Castle		Leamaneah North	52°59′15″N 9°08′23″W
16	Dysert O'Dea	Church, Round Tower & Cross		Mollaneen	52°54′33″N 9°04′06″W
649	Mooghaun	Hillfort		Mooghaun	52°46′59″N 8°52′43″W
176	Killone Abbey	Abbey (Augustinian)		Ennis	52°48′22″N 9°00′15″W
12	Oughtmama	Three Churches		Oughtmama	53°07′01″N 9°02′19″W
17	Ruan Church	Church		Portlecka	52°55′41″N 8°59′24″W
632	Poulnabrone	Portal Tomb		Poulnabrone	53°02′55″N 9°08′24″W
15	Quin Abbey	Friary (Franciscan)		Quin	52°49′09″N 8°51′47″W
427	Carrigaholt Castle	Castle		Carrigaholt	52°36′00″N 9°41′58″W
10	Scattery Island (Inis Cathaigh)	Early Medieval Ecclesiastical Site		Kilrush	52°36′42″N 9°31′10″W
6	St. Flannan's Cathedral	Church		Killaloe	52°48′23″N 8°26′21″W
270	Slievenaglasha Wedge Tomb	Wedge Tomb		Slievenaglasha	53°01′02″N 9°03′06″W
13	Temple Cronan	Church		Termon	53°02′46″N 9°03′40″W
224	Magh Adhair	Inauguration Site		Toonagh	52°50′28″N 8°49′44″W
270	Tullycommon Wedge Tomb	Wedge Tomb		Tullycommon	53°01′32″N 9°03′31″W
270	Cashlaungarr	Cashel		Tullycommon	53°00′48″N 9°04′47″W
270	Cahercommaun	Cashel		Carran	53°00′52″N 9°04′14″W

== Sources ==
- "National Monuments in State Care: Ownership & Guardianship" (PDF). Ireland: National Monuments Service. 4 March 2009.
