= Rath, County Clare =

Civil parish in County Clare, Ireland

Rath An Ráth
- Civil parish
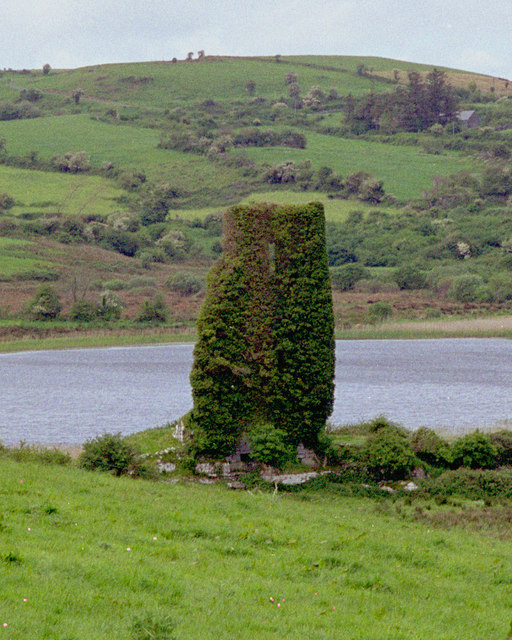
- Rath Castle

- Location within Ireland
- Coordinates: 52.919965°N 9.088808°W
- Country: Ireland
- County: Clare
- Barony: Inchiquin

Rath (Irish: An Ráth) is a civil parish in the barony of Inchiquin in County Clare, Ireland.

== Location ==
Rath lies on the R460 regional road between Inagh to the south-west and Corofin to the north-east. It is about 5.75 miles (9.25 km) northwest of the county town – Ennis. Corofin, in the parish of Kilnaboy, is about 1.75 miles (2.82 km) to the south. The parish is 6.5 by 2.75 miles (10.46 by 4.43 km) and covers 8,488 acres (3,435 ha). The bridge at Corofin over the River Fergus is the northern boundary of the parish. Hamlets include Riverston and Knockmacart. The former West Clare Railway traversed the parish from east to west.

The land consists of a mix of coarse pasture and good arable land. It contains parts of the lakes of Inchiquin and Tadane.

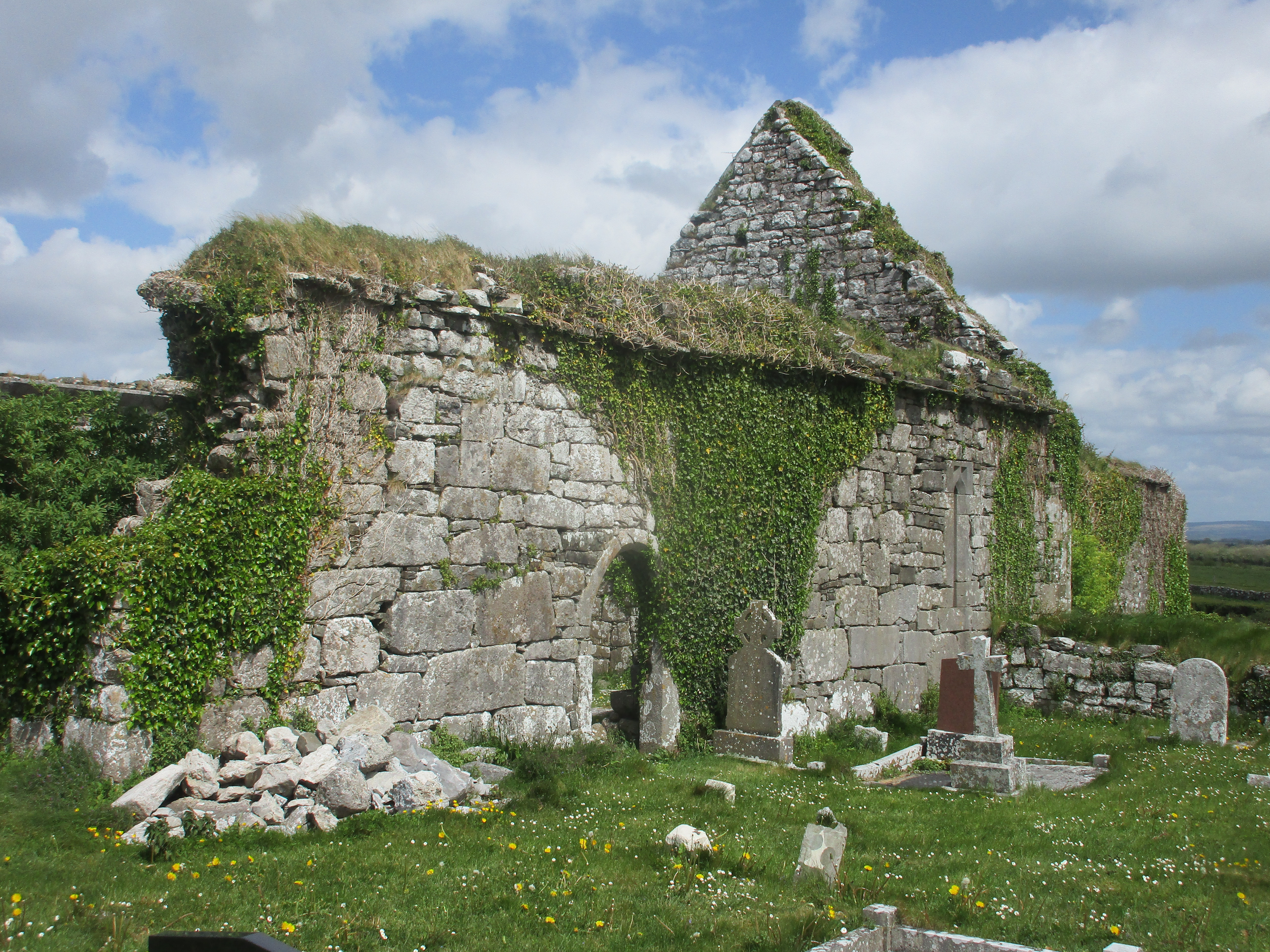
Ruins of Rath Church.

There are the ruins of an ancient church near the shore of a small lake, and nearby the ruined Rath Castle. Other ruined castles are O'Nial's Court, once the residence of the O'Nials, and Tier Mac Bran castle near the shore of Inchiquin lake. In 1841 the population was 2,647 in 398 houses. The parish today is part of the Catholic parish of Corofin, Kilnaboy and Rath. It is served by the church of St Mary's in Rath.

== Legend of Lough Raha ==
Lough Raha is said to be the place where the early Irish saint Mac Creiche defeated the Brioch-Seach, or badger monster. The demon badger killed both cattle and men, and was not subdued by the prayers of six local saints. When Mac Creiche arrived the monster, as high as a tall tree, was pursuing and killing the people, discharging balls of fire from its mouth. The saint drove the monster into the waters of the lake, which turned red. The monster rose up again, and Mac Creiche took his cowl and threw it over the monster. The cowl grew so it was "like a cowl of smelted iron" that pressed the monster to the lake bed. The monster would not arise again until the eve of Judgement Day.

== Townlands ==
The parish contains the townlands of Annagh, Applevale, Ballykinnacorra North, Ballykinnacorra South, Boherbullog, Cahercorcaun, Cahernamona, Carnane, Carrowduff, Carrownagarraun, Carrowvere, Craggaunboy, Clifden, Cregmoher, Curraghkeel, Drinagh, Gortcooldurrin, Gortnaglough, Killeen, Kihaska, Knocknareeha, Liscullaun, Loughnagowan, Maghera, Martry, Moanreel North, Moanreel South, Moherbullog, Moyhill, Poulbaun, Rafline, Rath, Roxton, Scool, Shessiv and Tonlegee.
