= Cashlaungar =

Stone ringfort in County Clare, Ireland

- An Caisleán Gearr
- Cashlaungarr, Cashlaun Gar
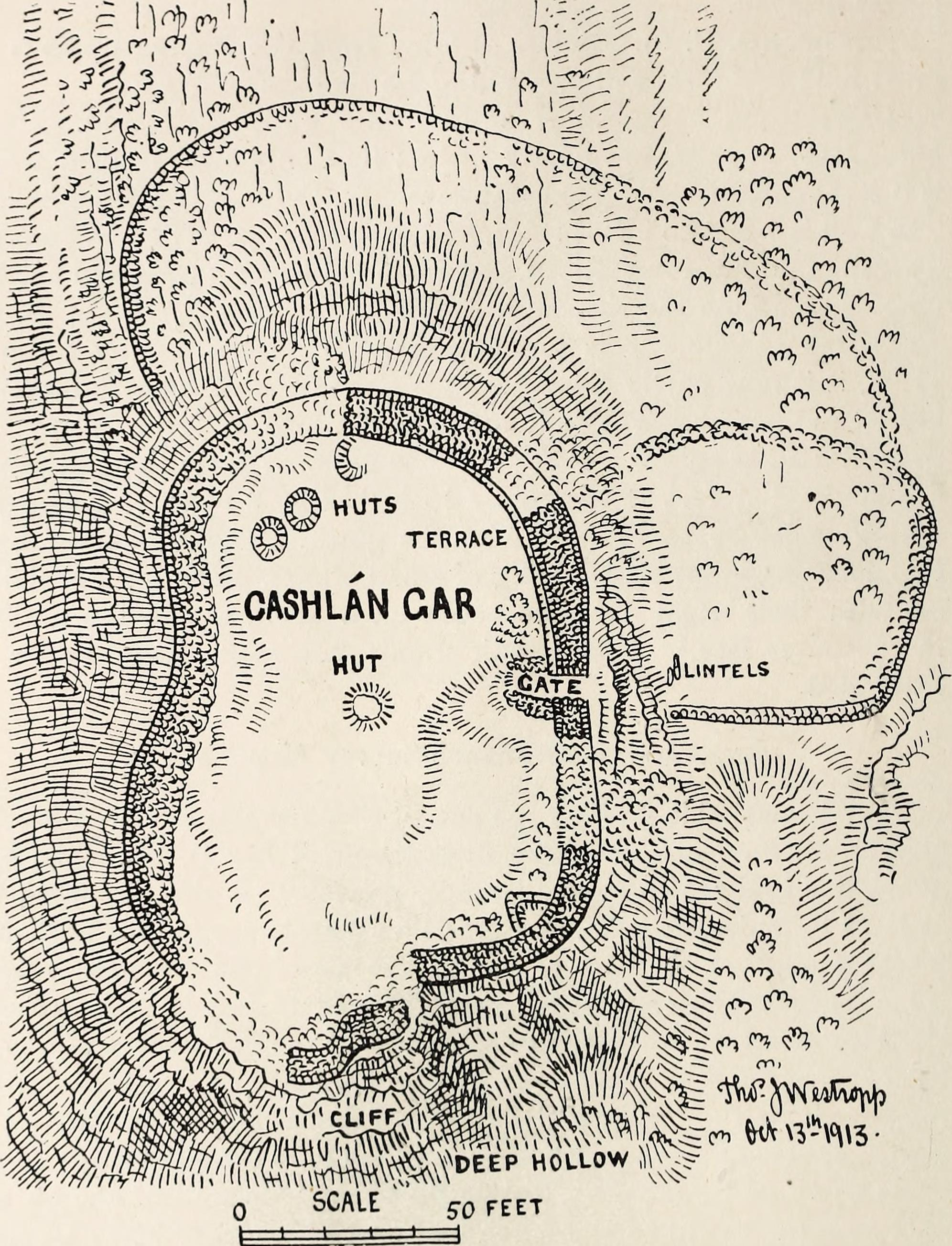
- Diagram, Westropp (1913)

- Location within Ireland
- 53.013209°N 9.079590°W
- Type: Ringfort
- Location: Parish of Kilnaboy, The Burren
- Region: Ireland

Site notes
- Material: limestone
- Area: 914 m^{2} (9,840 sq ft)
- Owner: Public
- Public access: Yes

National monument of Ireland
- Official name: Cashlaungarr
- Reference no.: 270

Cashlaungar (Irish: An Caisleán Gearr), also Cashlaungarr, Cashlaun Gar or Cashlán Gar, is a stone ringfort (cashel) and National Monument located in The Burren, a region in County Clare, Ireland.

== Location ==
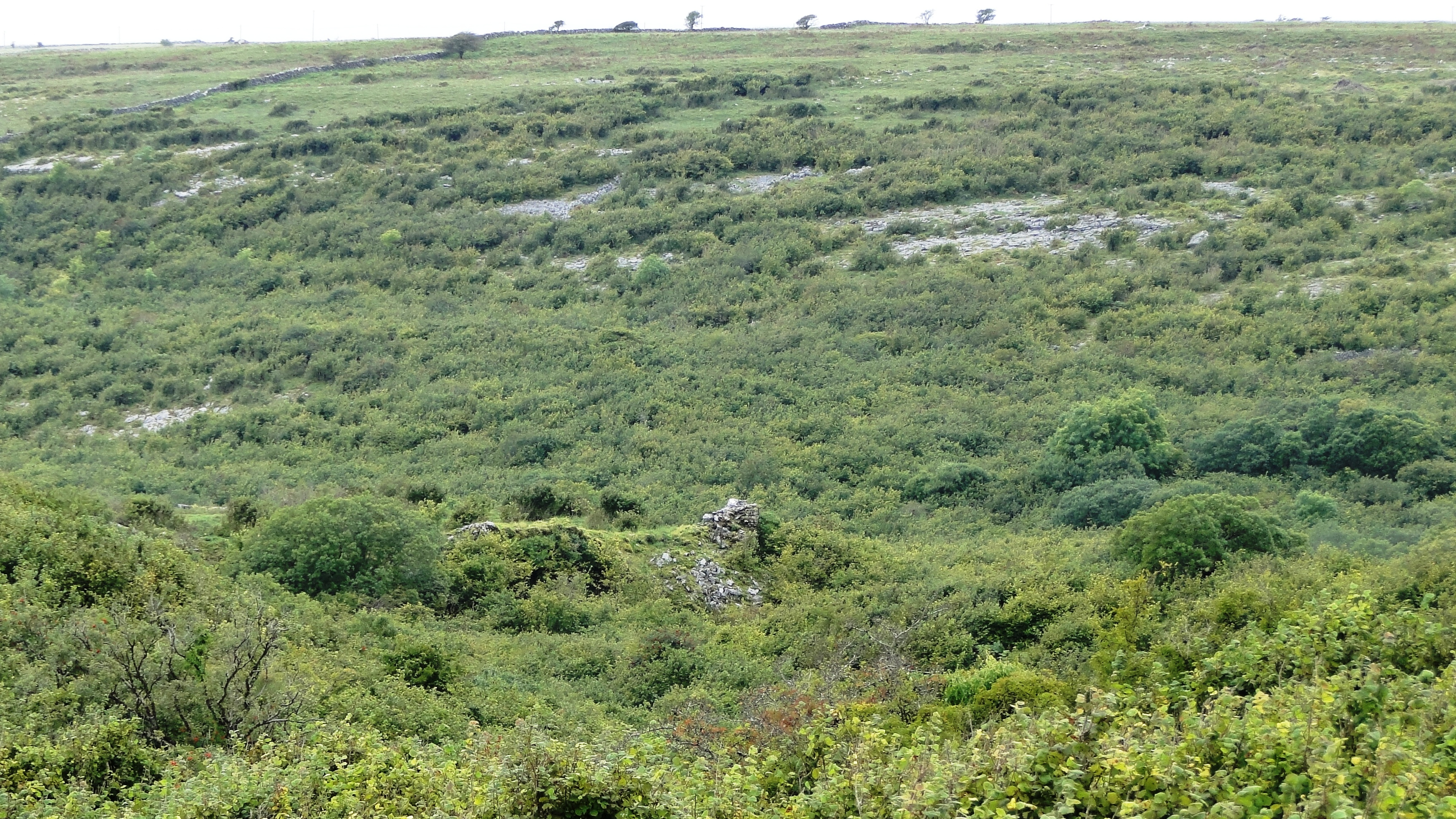
View from the east, from a point near Cahercommaun ringfort, 2016

Cashlaungar is located in the centre of The Burren, 2.7 km (1.8 miles) south of Carran, overlooking the Kilnaboy–Carran road to the west. It lies at an elevation of 116 m (381 ft).

It is located in the townland of Tullycommon, parish of Kilnaboy, not far from the larger ringfort Cahercommaun and Tullycommon Wedge Tomb.

== History ==
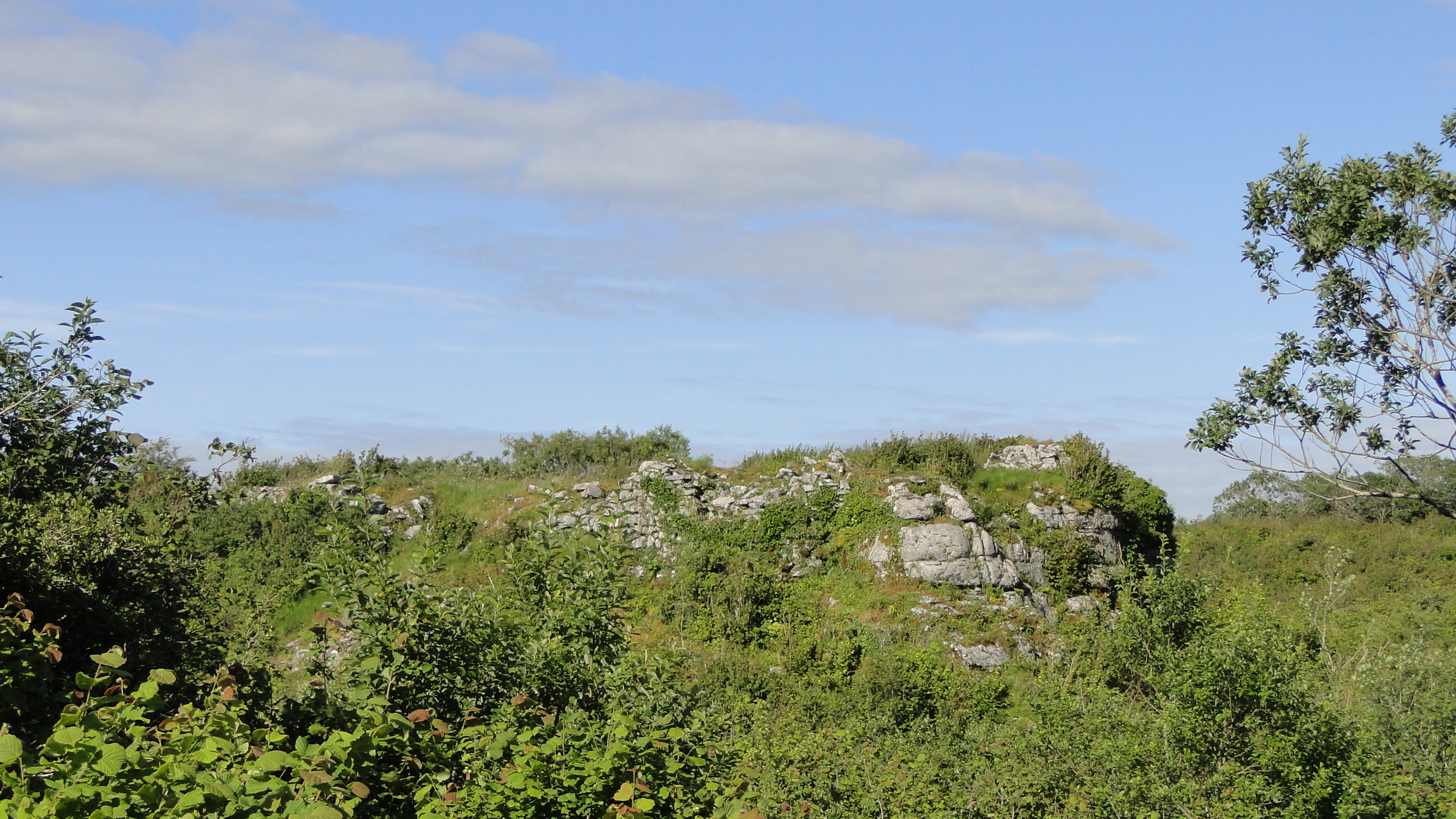
View from the road to the southwest, 2012

The townland of Tullycommon is probably the Tuluauch-comyn held by (King Torlough) O'Brien in 1298 as given in the Pipe rolls. Through it in 1317 the army of Diarmait O'Brien reportedly marched on his way to Corcomroe Abbey, "along the fortress-begirt tracks" between Leana and Crughwill.

Hugh Roe O'Donnell's troops plundered it in their great raid into Thomond in 1599.

Excavation unearthed middens, deer and ox bones.

== Description ==
This cashel is a stone fort situated on the top of a steep-sided rocky outcrop.

When antiquarian Thomas Johnson Westropp visited it in the 1910s, the ramparts of the ringfort were preserved in three places and built of long worked blocks. They reached their greatest height in the northeast at 4 m (13 ft) and a thickness of 2.7 to 3.0 m (9–10 ft). The gate opened to the edge of a steep 10 m high slope. At the foot of the slope were rock fragments, probably the broken lintels of the gatehouse. The fort measures internally about 40 m from north to south and 23 m from west to east. The gate was 3 m above ground level and was probably reached by ladder.

The ruins of four round huts and one beehive hut were found on Cashlaungar.
