= Inchiquin =

Barony in County Clare, Ireland

- Location within Ireland
- Coordinates: 52.944966°N 9.062704°W
- Country: Ireland
- Province: Munster
- County: Clare

Inchiquin (Irish: Inse Uí Chuinn) is a barony in County Clare, Ireland. This geographical unit of land is one of 11 baronies in the county. Its chief town is Corofin. It is administered by Clare County Council. This barony is identical to the Uí Fhearmaic Túath ruled by the O'Deas, Quins and Griffins.

== Legal context ==
Baronies were created after the Norman invasion of Ireland as divisions of counties and were used the administration of justice and the raising of revenue. Although baronies continue to be officially defined units, they have been administratively obsolete since 1898. However, they continue to be used in land registration and in specification, such as in planning permissions.

== Extent ==
Inchiquin is bounded on the north and north-east by the county of Galway. Within the county of Clare, it is bounded by the baronies of Bunratty Upper (to the east), Islands (to the south), Ibrickane (to the south-west), Corcomroe (to the west) and by Burren (to the north-west ).

It covers 88,387 acres (35,769 ha) of which 2,854 acres (1,155 ha) is water, including Lough Tedano, Lough Inchiquin and two chains of smaller lakes. The land is relatively flat, either farmland or moor.

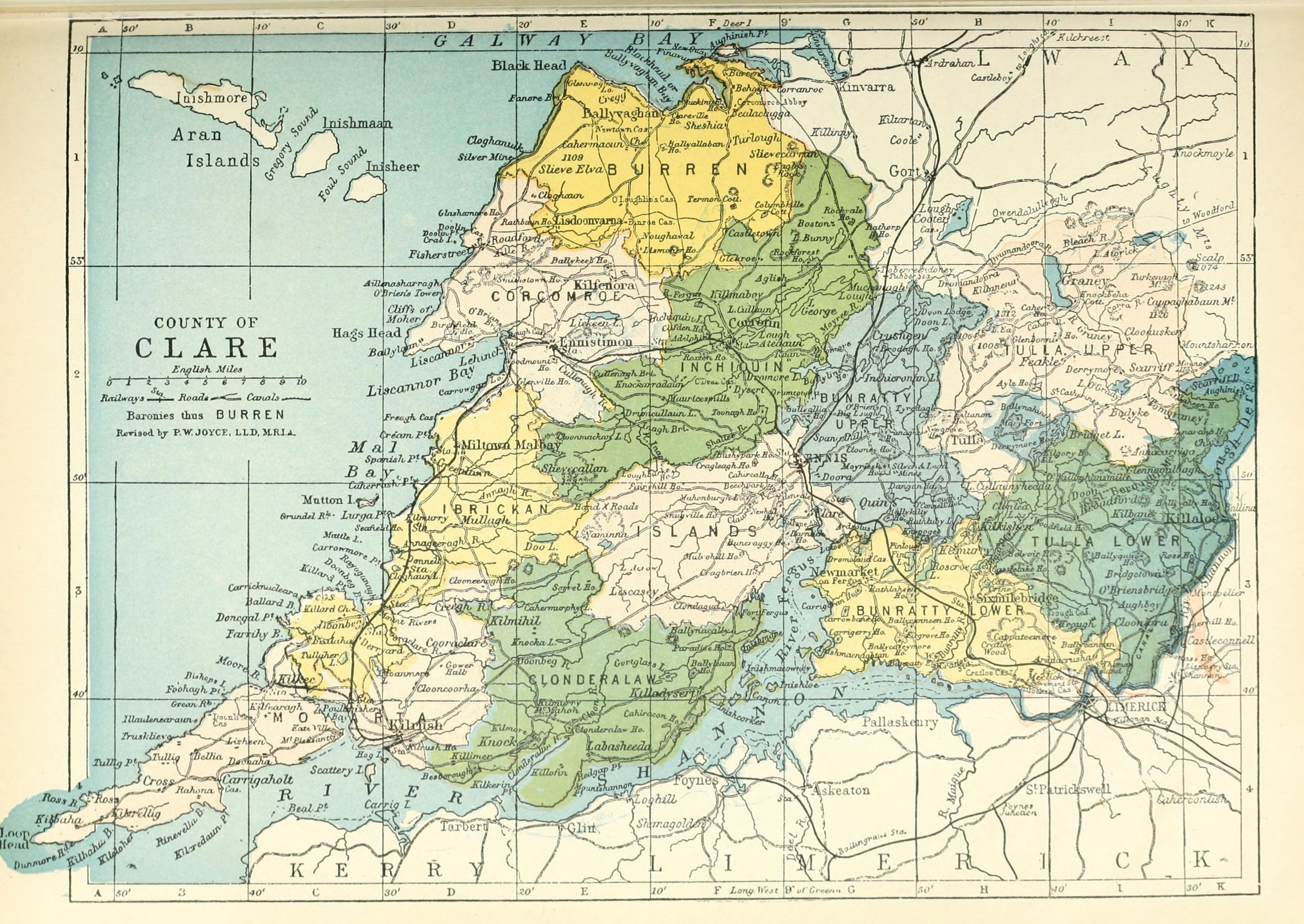
Baronies of Clare. Inchiquin is in the center, north of Islands.

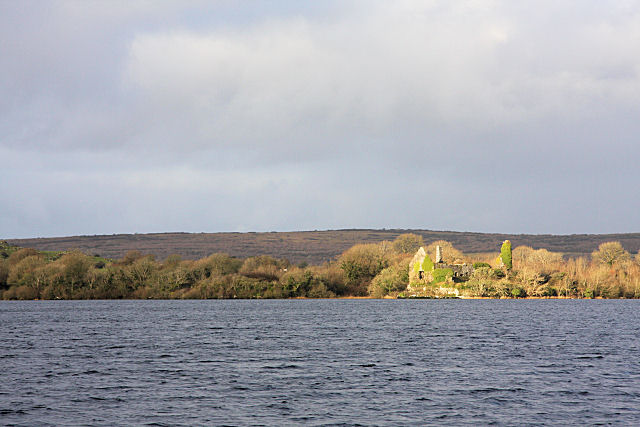
Castle on Lough Inchiquin

== Civil parishes ==
The ruins of Inchiquin Castle stand near Lough Inchiquin. This was once the residence of the O'Briens: Barons Inchiquin, Earls of Inchiquin and later Marquises of Thomond who were descended from Brian Boru, High King of Ireland. The barony contains the civil parishes of Inagh, Kilkeedy, Kilnaboy, Kilnamona, Rath, Ruan and Dysert.
