= Temple Cronan =

- Teampall Chrónáin (Irish)
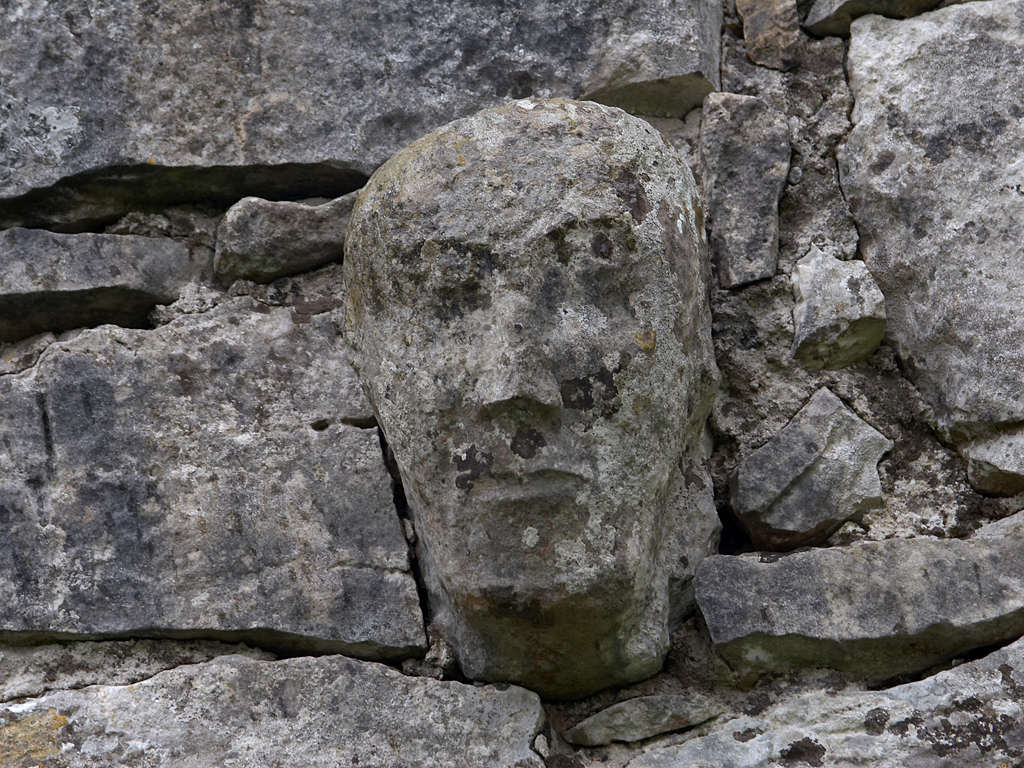
- One of the carved stone faces in the walls of Temple Cronan

- Location within Ireland
- 53°2′47″N 9°3′40″W
- Location: County Clare, Ireland

History
- Built: 12th century

National monument of Ireland
- Reference no.: 13

Temple Cronan is a ruined medieval oratory or chapel built near a holy well in the Burren, County Clare, Ireland. The current building apparently dates from the 12th and 15th centuries, although it may partly incorporate earlier buildings or some of the masonry thereof. It may have been the site of an early Christian monastery. Temple Cronan is located in the civil parish of Carran, eight miles from Corofin and about sixteen miles from Ennis.

== History ==
Some have argued on the basis of the existing visible structures that Temple Cronan was originally built to serve as a pagan temple. The current building had a window on the eastern wall as well as a small "Cyclopean" doorway on the west side, which is currently blocked by rubble. More conventional archaeologists see an early Christian (i.e. pre-12th-century) structure that was likely rebuilt or altered in the 12th and 15th centuries. It probably replaced one, perhaps of wood, set up under the reputed founder in the 7th century, one "Cronan" who may have been Saint Cronan of Roscrea, who died in 640, or Cronan Mochua of Balla, who died in 637.

Early features include the "cyclopean" masonry, trabeate doorway (with inward sloping jambs) and the small window in the west wall.

Some parts of an older construction, such as part of a doorway, may have been reused in the 12th-century construction. In the 12th century Temple Cronan was a site for pilgrimages. The building was most likely renovated again in the 15th century as is evidenced by the Gothic arch of the door.

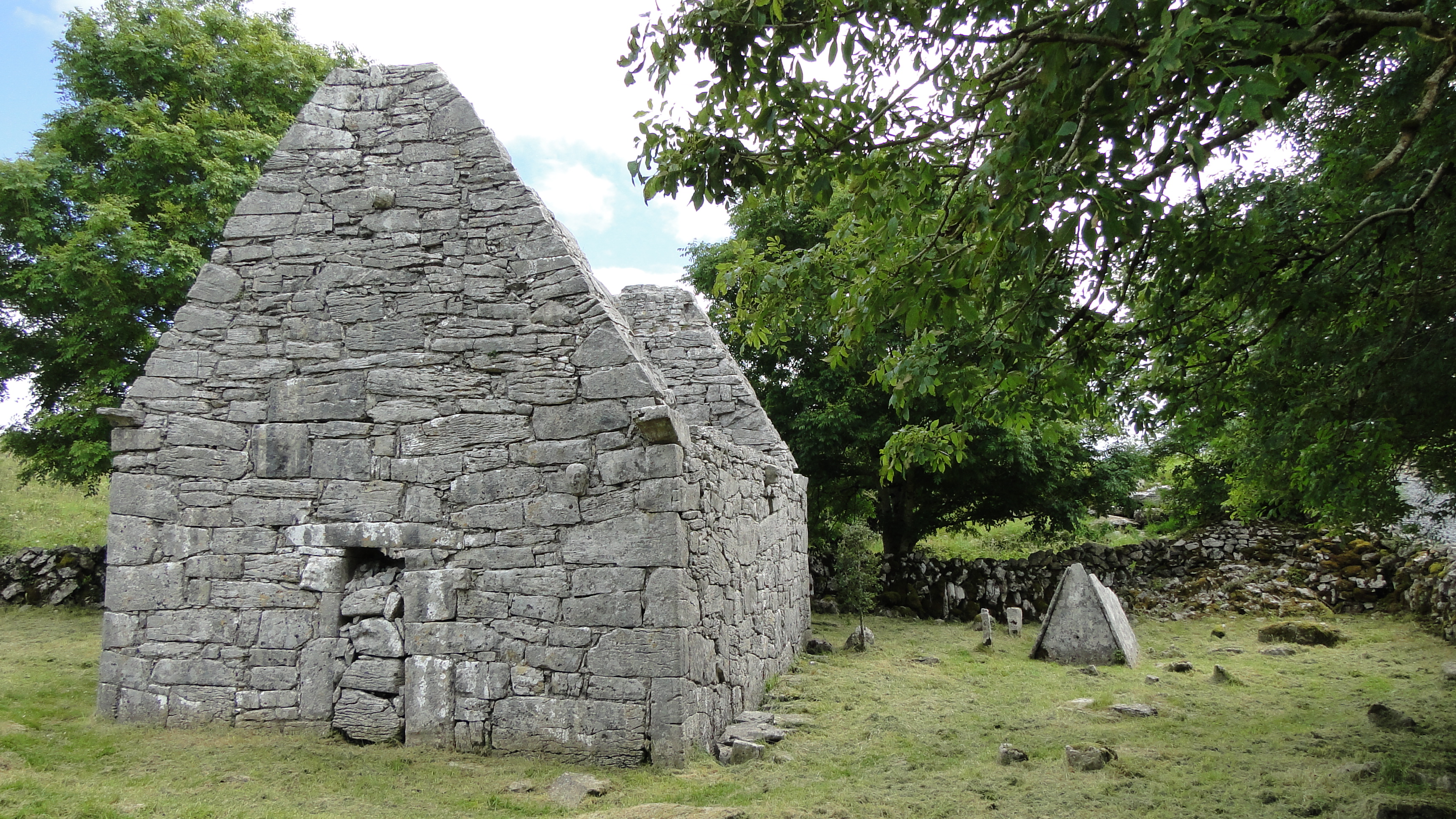
A view of the exterior of Temple Cronan.

No excavations have been conducted here, so much of the history of the place remains speculative.

== Construction and building features ==
The possible monastic site includes the chapel/oratory, two shrines, a holy well, a termonn wall, a termon cross and several domestic buildings.

The ruins of the latter are located to the north and they most likely fulfilled non-religious duties for the monastery. Also to the northeast of the monastery is a quarry. It is from this quarry that much of the construction material used to build Temple Cronan and the other nearby buildings was likely gathered. In the northwest corner of the area, there is the remains of a large stone high cross "of considerable height" and its pedestal, which probably marked the boundaries of the Temple Cronan grounds (a termonn cross).

The one-roomed oratory itself is a rectangular building 6.6 metres (22 ft) metres long and 3.9 metres (13 ft) wide. Because of its age, the high pitched roof, decorated with corbels at its corners, has fallen apart, but the side walls and gables are still erect. The lower walls are made of limestone blocks. The original door on the west side of the oratory is blocked by rubble, and the current entrance to the oratory is located on the north wall. This door, probably constructed in the 15th century during the second renovation, is topped by a carved stone head. There are six or seven Romanesque carved stone human and animal heads at irregular points along the wall as decoration, several apparently not in their original location.

The two tomb shrines are constructed of two slabs of stone, on the east side of the building, probably built in the twelfth century and possibly the destination of pilgrims travelling to the Temple Cronan. Around 100 meters to the south of the site is a holy well at the base of a small cliff called Tobar Chronain, most likely named after St. Cronan.
