= Kilnaboy =

Village in County Clare, Ireland

Kilnaboy Cill Iníne Baoith
- Village, townland, civil parish
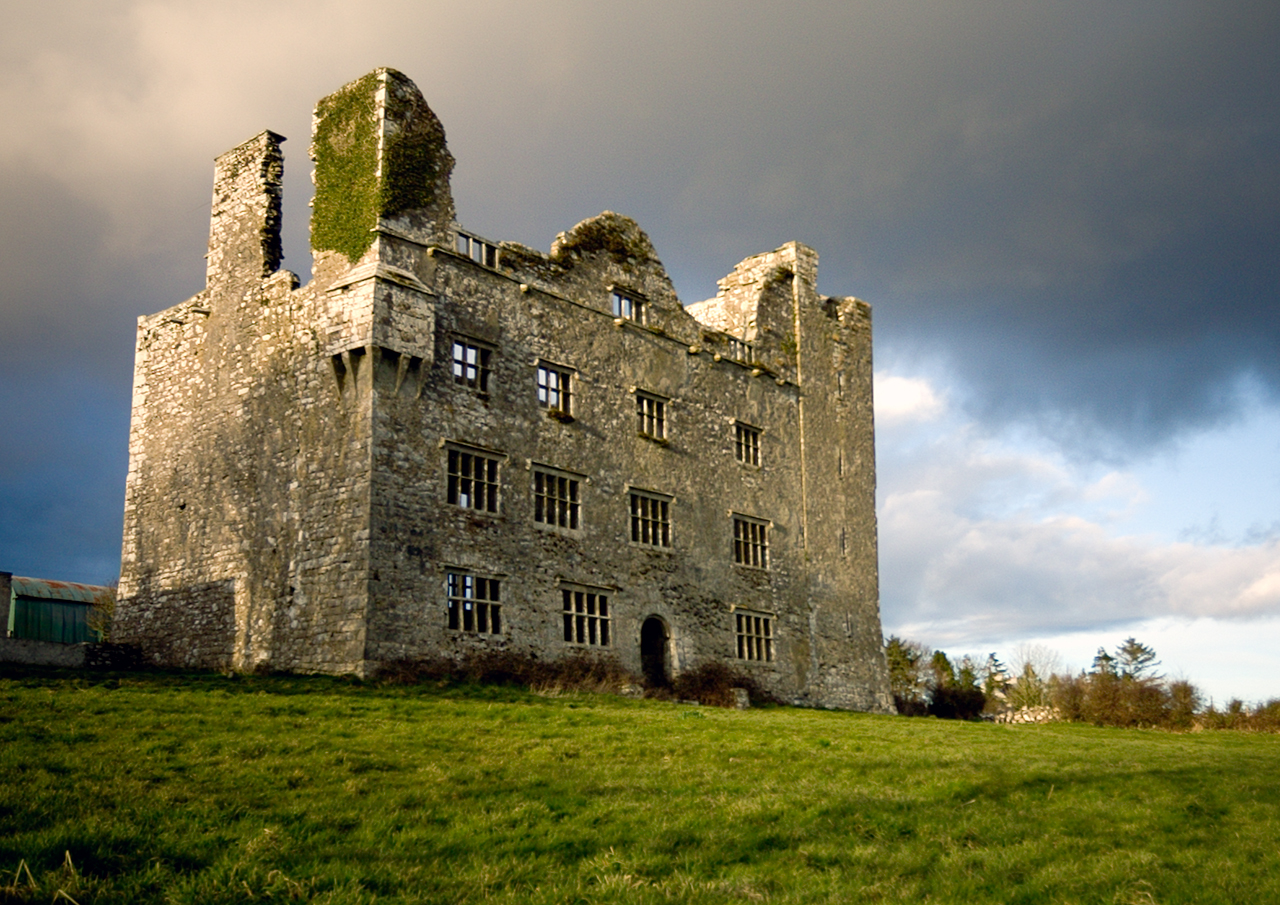
- Leamaneh Castle

- Location in Ireland
- Coordinates: 52°58′11″N 9°05′07″W
- Country: Ireland
- Province: Munster
- County: County Clare

Population (2011)
  - Total: 689
- Time zone: UTC+0 (WET)
  - Summer (DST): UTC-1 (IST (WEST))

Kilnaboy or Killinaboy (Irish: Cill Iníne Baoith, meaning 'church of Baoth's daughter') is a village, townland and civil parish in County Clare, Ireland. It is located in the Burren, and as of the 2011 census the area had 347 inhabitants.

== Civil parish ==
Kilnaboy is a parish in the historic Barony of Inchiquin. Its chief town, Corofin, is located on the southern extremity of the parish. It is mentioned with regard to the Papal taxation of 1302-06.

=== Geography ===
Three kilometres north of Corofin, the village is on the southeastern border of the limestone hills of the Burren and extends both into the lowlands to the south and into the hills to the north. Mullaghmore mountain is close by. There are extensive tracts of bog in the eastern portion of the parish. According to the 1837 survey of Lewis:

"The surface is boldly diversified and embellished with the picturesque lakes of Inchiquin and Tadune, the latter of which is but partly in the parish. The lake of Inchiquin is about 2½ miles in circumference, and is situated at the base of a richly wooded range of hills, forming a fine contrast to the bare limestone rocks in the vicinity."

Most of Inchiquin Lough is located in the parish, except for a small area in the southwest which lies in the parish of Rath, County Clare.

=== Places of interest ===
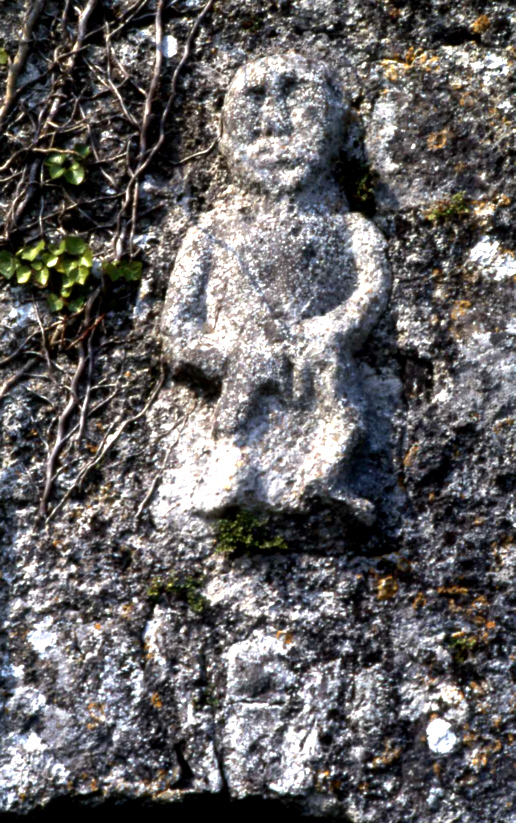
Sheela na Gig on the Kilnaboy church

There are over 300 national monuments in the area including Leamaneh Castle and Cahercommaun stone fort. On Roughan Hill there are a number of prehistoric structures including several wedge tombs such as Parknabinnia wedge tomb. Other wedge tombs are located in Tullycommon and Slievenaglasha townlands.

Kilnaboy has a medieval church of 11th-century origin, repaired in 1715. The church includes a Sheela na Gig (possible medieval fertility symbol) over the door and a cross on the church gable. There is a round tower nearby.

Much of the territory making up the "Burren National Park" is located in Kilnaboy parish, but it extends into other neighbouring parishes. It is sometimes visited by botanists and archeologists.

Glanquin house, Kilnaboy was used as an exterior of "Craggy Island Parochial House" in the comedy series Father Ted.

Leamaneh, Inchiquin and Ballyportry castles are located in the parish. Ballyportry is completely restored, while the other two are ruins. Other sites include Cross Inneenboy (a 12th century cross), and Cashlaungar (a stone ringfort located on the road to Carran).

== Ecclesiastical parish ==
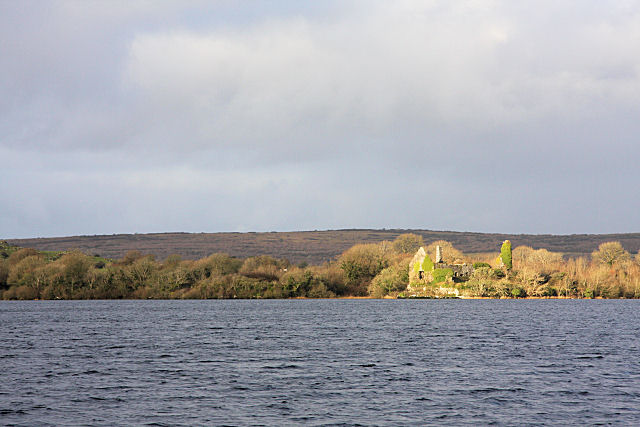
Inchiquin Castle seen across Inchiquin Lough

Kilnaboy is part of the parish of RC (Corofin, Kilnaboy and Rath) in the Roman Catholic Diocese of Killaloe. There are three churches in the parish: St Brigid's (Corofin), St Joseph's (Kilnaboy) and St Mary's (Rath).

== Notable people ==
- Kilnaboy is home to the former Minister for defence, Tony Killeen.
- Seamus Clancy is the first Clare footballer to win an All-Star award which was achieved in 1992. His brother Colm Clancy also had a role in that Munster championship winning side and their father Donal was one of the selectors.
- Francis G. Neylon, a traditional Irish musician (concert flute, piccolo), was born in Kilnaboy in 1921 in the cottage now known as Tigh Éamoin.
- Michael Sonny Murphy, Ballycashen, Kilnaboy represented Ireland in the 3000 Meter Steeplechase at the 1932 Los Angeles Olympic games. He also held many County, Munster and National titles. He died aged 29 in 1936. A 10 mile Road Race is held every year in his memory.(11)
- Colonel Thomas Blood (1618 – 24 August 1680) Who attempted to steal the English Crown Jewels was born in Kilnaboy.

== See also ==
- List of towns and villages in Ireland
