= Parknabinnia (wedge tomb) =

Prehistoric wedge tomb located in Ireland

Parknabinnia wedge tomb
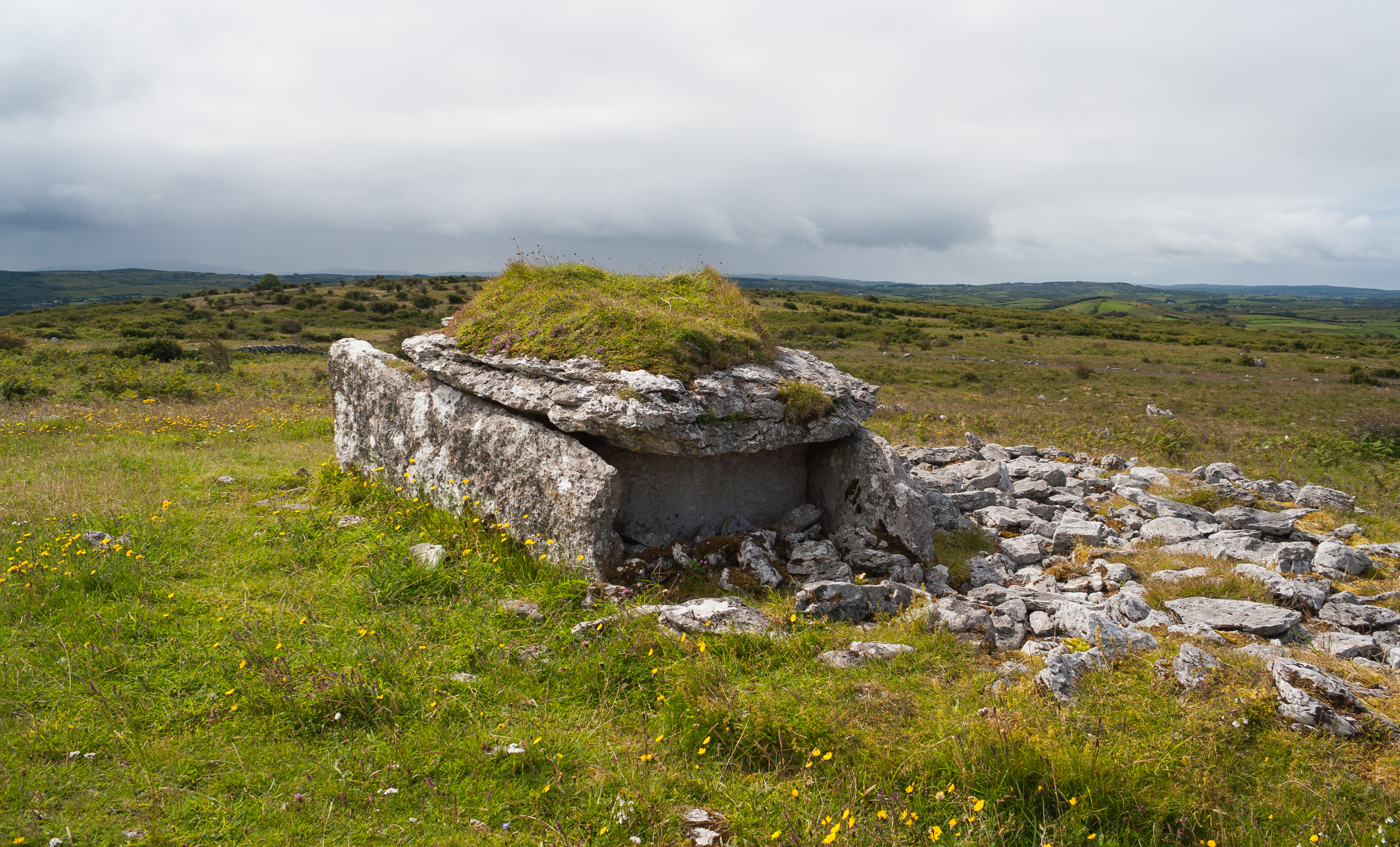
- Parknabinnia wedge tomb in 2015

- Location within Ireland
- 52.988°N 9.095°W
- Type: Wedge tomb
- Periods: late Neolithic/early Bronze Age
- Location: Kilnaboy, The Burren
- Region: Ireland

Site notes
- Owner: on private property
- Public access: Yes

Parknabinnia wedge tomb is a prehistoric wedge tomb located in the Burren area of County Clare, Ireland.

== Location ==
The tomb is located on Roughan Hill in the townland of Parknabinnia, in the parish of Kilnaboy. It is visible from the nearby road, but located on private property. There are a large number of other prehistoric structures on this hill: tombs, house remains and field walls. Creevagh wedge tomb is about 2.3 km away.

Parknabinnia is one of eighty wedge tombs still extant in Clare. The largest concentration of them is found on Roughan Hill.

== Description ==
The tomb is wedge-shaped in ground plan, with the widest part facing south west towards the setting sun like all tombs of this type. The setting sun is thus thought to have been of special significance to the builders. Two stones closed the entrance of the tomb, one of which may have been removable.

No wedge tomb in the Burren has so far been excavated, but the Roughan Hill tombs are tentatively dated to 2300 to 2000 BC.
