= Tony Killeen =

Irish former politician (born 1952)

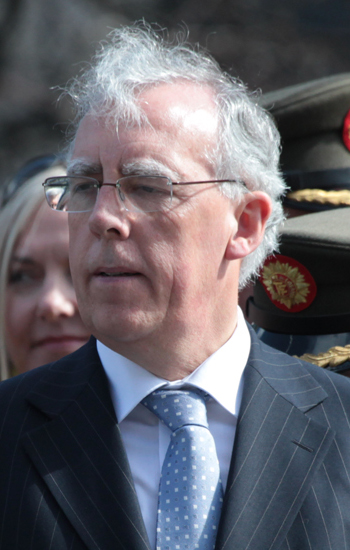

Minister for Defence
- In office 23 March 2010 – 19 January 2011
- Taoiseach: Brian Cowen
- Preceded by: Brian Cowen
- Succeeded by: Éamon Ó Cuív

Minister of State
- 2008–2010: Agriculture, Fisheries and Food
- 2007–2008: Communications, Energy and Natural Resources
- 2007–2008: Environment, Heritage and Local Government
- 2004–2007: Enterprise, Trade and Employment

Teachta Dála
- In office November 1992 – February 2011
- Constituency: Clare

Personal details
- Born: 9 June 1952 (age 74) Corofin, County Clare, Ireland
- Party: Fianna Fáil
- Spouse: Lily O'Keeffe (m. 1988)
- Children: 5
- Education: Mary Immaculate College

Anthony Killeen (born 9 June 1952) is an Irish former Fianna Fáil politician who served as Minister for Defence from 2010 to 2011, Minister of State for Fisheries and Forestry from 2008 to 2010, Minister of State at the Department of the Environment, Heritage and Local Government and at the Department of Communications, Energy and Natural Resources from 2007 to 2008 and Minister of State for Labour Affairs from 2004 to 2007. He served as a Teachta Dála (TD) for the Clare constituency from 1992 to 2011.

== Early and personal life ==
Killeen was born in Corofin, County Clare, and educated at St Flannan's College, Ennis and Mary Immaculate College, Limerick. He worked as a national school teacher before entering into politics.

He is married to Lily O'Keeffe; they have five sons and live in Kilnaboy, County Clare.

== Political career ==
Killeen first held political office in 1985 when he was elected to Clare County Council and served on that body until 1997. He was chairman of that local authority from 1989 to 1991. At the 1992 general election, he was elected to Dáil Éireann as a Fianna Fáil TD for the Clare constituency for the first time and retained his seat at each subsequent election until his retirement in 2011.

Killeen has served on a number of committees, including the Joint Oireachtas Committee on Education and Science, the Committee on Procedure and Privileges and the Committee on Members' Interests in Dáil Éireann.

In 2004, he was appointed as Minister of State at the Department of Enterprise, Trade and Employment with special responsibility for Labour Affairs. In June 2007, he was appointed as Minister of State at the Department of the Environment, Heritage and Local Government and at the Department of Communications, Energy and Natural Resources with special responsibility for Environment and Energy. In May 2008, he was appointed as Minister of State at the Department of Agriculture, Fisheries and Food with special responsibility for Fisheries and Forestry.

In January 2007, it emerged that Killeen's office had sent letters to the Minister for Justice, Equality and Law Reform advocating for the early release of a convicted child rapist. Killeen refused to resign as Minister of State.

On 23 March 2010, Taoiseach Brian Cowen appointed Killeen as Minister of Defence replacing Willie O'Dea who had resigned for committing perjury in front of the High Court.

On 6 January 2011, Killeen announced his decision not to contest the 2011 general election, citing medical advice, having been diagnosed with bowel cancer in 2008. He resigned as Minister for Defence on 19 January 2011.

Political offices
| Preceded by Frank Fahey | Minister of State at the Department of Enterprise, Trade and Employment; 2004–2007 | Succeeded by Billy Kelleher |
| Preceded by Noel Ahern; Batt O'Keeffe | Minister of State at the Department of the Environment, Heritage and Local Government with Máire Hoctor and Batt O'Keeffe; 2007–2008 | Succeeded by Michael Finneran; Máire Hoctor; Michael P. Kitt |
| Preceded by John Browne | Minister of State at the Department of Communications, Energy and Natural Resources; 2007–2008 | Succeeded by Seán Power |
| Preceded by John Browne | Minister of State at the Department of Agriculture, Food and the Marine; 2008–2010 | Succeeded by Seán Connick |
| Preceded by Brian Cowen (Acting) | Minister for Defence; 2010–2011 | Succeeded by Éamon Ó Cuív |

| Dáil | Election | Deputy (Party) | Deputy (Party) | Deputy (Party) | Deputy (Party) | Deputy (Party) |
|---|---|---|---|---|---|---|
| 2nd | 1921 | Éamon de Valera (SF) | Brian O'Higgins (SF) | Seán Liddy (SF) | Patrick Brennan (SF) | 4 seats 1921–1923 |
| 3rd | 1922 | Éamon de Valera (AT-SF) | Brian O'Higgins (AT-SF) | Seán Liddy (PT-SF) | Patrick Brennan (PT-SF) | 4 seats 1921–1923 |
| 4th | 1923 | Éamon de Valera (Rep) | Brian O'Higgins (Rep) | Conor Hogan (FP) | Patrick Hogan (Lab) | Eoin MacNeill (CnaG) |
| 5th | 1927 (Jun) | Éamon de Valera (FF) | Patrick Houlihan (FF) | Thomas Falvey (FP) | Patrick Hogan (Lab) | Patrick Kelly (CnaG) |
| 6th | 1927 (Sep) | Éamon de Valera (FF) | Patrick Houlihan (FF) | Martin Sexton (FF) | Patrick Hogan (Lab) | Patrick Kelly (CnaG) |
| 7th | 1932 | Éamon de Valera (FF) | Seán O'Grady (FF) | Martin Sexton (FF) | Patrick Hogan (Lab) | Patrick Burke (CnaG) |
| 8th | 1933 | Éamon de Valera (FF) | Seán O'Grady (FF) | Patrick Houlihan (FF) | Patrick Hogan (Lab) | Patrick Burke (CnaG) |
| 9th | 1937 | Éamon de Valera (FF) | Seán O'Grady (FF) | Thomas Burke (FP) | Patrick Hogan (Lab) | Patrick Burke (FG) |
| 10th | 1938 | Éamon de Valera (FF) | Seán O'Grady (FF) | Thomas Burke (FP) | Peter O'Loghlen (FF) | Patrick Burke (FG) |
| 11th | 1943 | Éamon de Valera (FF) | Seán O'Grady (FF) | Thomas Burke (FP) | Patrick Hogan (Lab) | Patrick Burke (FG) |
| 12th | 1944 | Éamon de Valera (FF) | Seán O'Grady (FF) | Thomas Burke (FP) | Peter O'Loghlen (FF) | Patrick Burke (FG) |
| 12th | 1945 by-election | Éamon de Valera (FF) | Seán O'Grady (FF) | Thomas Burke (FP) | Peter O'Loghlen (FF) | Patrick Shanahan (FF) |
| 13th | 1948 | Éamon de Valera (FF) | Seán O'Grady (FF) | Thomas Burke (FP) | Patrick Hogan (Lab) | 4 seats 1948–1969 |
| 14th | 1951 | Éamon de Valera (FF) | Patrick Hillery (FF) | William Murphy (FG) | Patrick Hogan (Lab) | 4 seats 1948–1969 |
| 15th | 1954 | Éamon de Valera (FF) | Patrick Hillery (FF) | William Murphy (FG) | Patrick Hogan (Lab) | 4 seats 1948–1969 |
| 16th | 1957 | Éamon de Valera (FF) | Patrick Hillery (FF) | William Murphy (FG) | Patrick Hogan (Lab) | 4 seats 1948–1969 |
| 16th | 1959 by-election | Seán Ó Ceallaigh (FF) | Patrick Hillery (FF) | William Murphy (FG) | Patrick Hogan (Lab) | 4 seats 1948–1969 |
| 17th | 1961 | Seán Ó Ceallaigh (FF) | Patrick Hillery (FF) | William Murphy (FG) | Patrick Hogan (Lab) | 4 seats 1948–1969 |
| 18th | 1965 | Seán Ó Ceallaigh (FF) | Patrick Hillery (FF) | William Murphy (FG) | Patrick Hogan (Lab) | 4 seats 1948–1969 |
| 18th | 1968 by-election | Seán Ó Ceallaigh (FF) | Patrick Hillery (FF) | Sylvester Barrett (FF) | Patrick Hogan (Lab) | 4 seats 1948–1969 |
| 19th | 1969 | Frank Taylor (FG) | Patrick Hillery (FF) | Sylvester Barrett (FF) | 3 seats 1969–1981 | |
| 20th | 1973 | Frank Taylor (FG) | Brendan Daly (FF) | Sylvester Barrett (FF) | 3 seats 1969–1981 | |
| 21st | 1977 | Frank Taylor (FG) | Brendan Daly (FF) | Sylvester Barrett (FF) | 3 seats 1969–1981 | |
| 22nd | 1981 | Madeleine Taylor (FG) | Brendan Daly (FF) | Sylvester Barrett (FF) | Bill Loughnane (FF) | 4 seats since 1981 |
| 23rd | 1982 (Feb) | Donal Carey (FG) | Brendan Daly (FF) | Sylvester Barrett (FF) | Bill Loughnane (FF) | 4 seats since 1981 |
| 24th | 1982 (Nov) | Donal Carey (FG) | Brendan Daly (FF) | Sylvester Barrett (FF) | Madeleine Taylor-Quinn (FG) | 4 seats since 1981 |
| 25th | 1987 | Donal Carey (FG) | Brendan Daly (FF) | Síle de Valera (FF) | Madeleine Taylor-Quinn (FG) | 4 seats since 1981 |
| 26th | 1989 | Donal Carey (FG) | Brendan Daly (FF) | Síle de Valera (FF) | Madeleine Taylor-Quinn (FG) | 4 seats since 1981 |
| 27th | 1992 | Donal Carey (FG) | Moosajee Bhamjee (Lab) | Síle de Valera (FF) | Tony Killeen (FF) | 4 seats since 1981 |
| 28th | 1997 | Donal Carey (FG) | Brendan Daly (FF) | Síle de Valera (FF) | Tony Killeen (FF) | 4 seats since 1981 |
| 29th | 2002 | Pat Breen (FG) | James Breen (Ind.) | Síle de Valera (FF) | Tony Killeen (FF) | 4 seats since 1981 |
| 30th | 2007 | Pat Breen (FG) | Joe Carey (FG) | Timmy Dooley (FF) | Tony Killeen (FF) | 4 seats since 1981 |
| 31st | 2011 | Pat Breen (FG) | Joe Carey (FG) | Timmy Dooley (FF) | Michael McNamara (Lab) | 4 seats since 1981 |
| 32nd | 2016 | Pat Breen (FG) | Joe Carey (FG) | Timmy Dooley (FF) | Michael Harty (Ind.) | 4 seats since 1981 |
| 33rd | 2020 | Violet-Anne Wynne (SF) | Joe Carey (FG) | Cathal Crowe (FF) | Michael McNamara (Ind.) | 4 seats since 1981 |
| 34th | 2024 | Donna McGettigan (SF) | Joe Cooney (FG) | Cathal Crowe (FF) | Timmy Dooley (FF) | 4 seats since 1981 |
