= Poulawack Cairn =

Prehistoric monument in the Burren, County Clare, Ireland

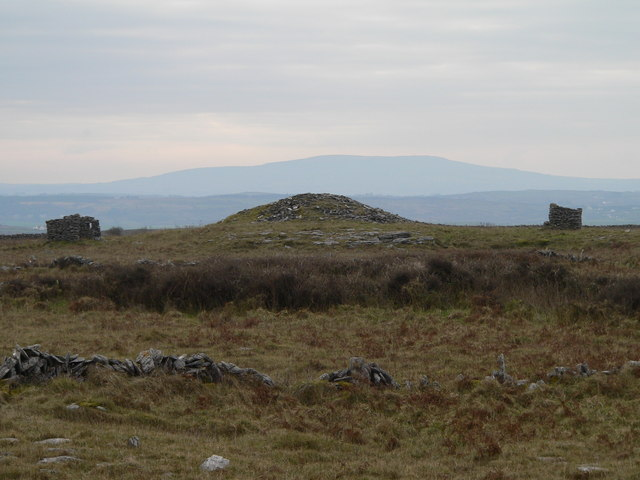
- Poulawack Cairn in 2006

- Location within Ireland
- 53.032°N 9.14472°W
- Type: Cairn
- Periods: Neolithic, Bronze Age
- Location: Carran, The Burren
- Region: Ireland

Site notes
- Excavation dates: 1934
- Owner: on private property
- Public access: Yes

Poulawack Cairn is a prehistoric burial cairn located in the Burren area of County Clare, Ireland.

== Location ==
The cairn is located in the townland of Poulawack, in the civil parish of Carran; it is situated on private property. There is also a cashel or ringfort nearby. Similar structures of notable size are found on Turlough Hill and Slievecarran in the north-east of The Burren.

== Description ==
Today, the cairn is about 21 m in diameter and 2.5 m high in the centre.

It was first excavated by Hugh Hencken of Harvard University in 1934 and has since then been the subject of repeated investigations. Hencken originally thought that the cairn was constructed in two phases over a relatively short time in the early Bronze Age (2000 to 1500 BC). It is now consensus, however, that the cairn was in fact built over a period of c. 1,800 years in three separate phases. Phase I is a polygonal stone cist made from slabs of limestone, dated to around 3500 BC (Neolithic), containing the remains of three adults and one child plus several objects. It was likely covered by a low cairn of stones with a surrounding circle of stones 10 m in diameter. Phase II took place over 1,000 years later. At that time three more burial cists were inserted into the cairn, which had previously likely collapsed partially outwards over the kerb stones. This phase, around 2000 BC, included the burial of eight people, which may have taken place over an extended period of time. The third and final phase of construction occurred over a relatively short time at some point between 1600 and 1400 BC. The original cairn was covered with a new, larger cairn surrounded by a new circle of kerb stones roughly 14 m in diameter. Three additional cists were inserted at that time, containing three more burials. The remains of a fourth person were found placed directly on the limestone surface of the plateau, covered with slabs and then enclosed within the expanding cairn. Thus the cairn saw burials of just 16 people over a 1,800-year period - as at Poulnabrone dolmen, only very special people were apparently buried at this site. Only a few items were found during excavations to include a scraper, a boar's tusk, a sea shell and some potsherds dating from the early Bronze Age.
