= Gerry Quinn (hurler) =

Irish hurler

Personal information
- Native name: Gearóid Ó Cuinn (Irish)
- Born: 24 July 1980 (age 46) Dabrien, Kilnaboy, County Clare
- Height: 6 ft 1 in (185 cm)

Sport
- Sport: Hurling
- Position: Left wing-back
Club
- Years: Club
- 1998-2012: Corofin
Club titles
- Clare titles: 0
Inter-county
- Years: County
- 2000-2008 2010-2011: Clare
Inter-county titles
- Munster titles: 0
- All-Irelands: 0
- NHL: 0
- All Stars: 0

Gerry Quinn (born 24 July 1980 in Dabrien, Kilnaboy, County Clare) is an Irish sportsperson. He played for Corofin and was a member of the Clare senior inter-county team since 2000. He was very highly regarded member of the Clare team and was nominated for two All star awards in 2002 and 2005 He was dropped early 2009 from the Clare panel by manager Mike McNamara but was reinstated the same year by manager Ger O'Loughlin.

In August 2004, Quinn was involved in an incident that left Henry Shefflin (Kilkenny) requiring an operation. In a clash, Quinn hit Shefflin in the eye. Shefflin accepted an apology.
