= Slievenaglasha Wedge Tomb =

- Carraig na Glaise (Irish)
- Dermot & Grania's Bed
- Location within Ireland
- 53.017331°N 9.051686°W
- Type: wedge-shaped gallery grave
- Location: Slievenaglasha, Kilnaboy, County Clare, Ireland

History
- Built: c. 2500–2000 BC

National monument of Ireland
- Official name: Slievenaglasha Wedge Tomb
- Reference no.: 270

Slievenaglasha wedge tomb is a wedge-shaped gallery grave and National Monument located in County Clare, Ireland.

== Location ==
Slievenaglasha wedge tomb is located on a hilltop at the western edge of the Burren, 2.7 km (1.7 mi) southeast of Carran. It lies in the townland also called Slievenaglasha, in the parish of Kilnaboy.

== History ==
Wedge tombs of this kind were built in Ireland in the late Neolithic and early Bronze Age, c. 2500–2000 BC. It was damaged in AD 1894.

=== Legend ===
Local lore associated the wedge tomb with a sea-green cow Glas Gaibhnenn, abducted from Spain by the smith Gavida. From this magical cow's udders used to flow all the rivers on the mountain-side (the "source of the seven streams" lies to the southwest), was tricked by a hag, who, in place of a milk-pail, milked her into a sieve. The cow either died of grief or deserted that locality for ever. Another version has Lon Mac Liomtha as her owner. The herd was supposedly housed at the wedge tomb of Slievenaglasha.

== Description ==
All that remains of this obviously once substantial ruined wedge tomb is a huge 3.5 m (11 ft 6 in) long wall slab on the northwest. The opposite wall and the capstone have both been damaged.
