= Creevagh (wedge tomb) =

Prehistoric Irish wedge tomb

Creevagh wedge tomb
- Location within Ireland
- 53.007°N 9.084°W
- Type: Wedge tomb
- Periods: late Neolithic/early Bronze Age
- Location: Carran, The Burren
- Region: Ireland

Site notes
- Owner: on private property
- Public access: Yes

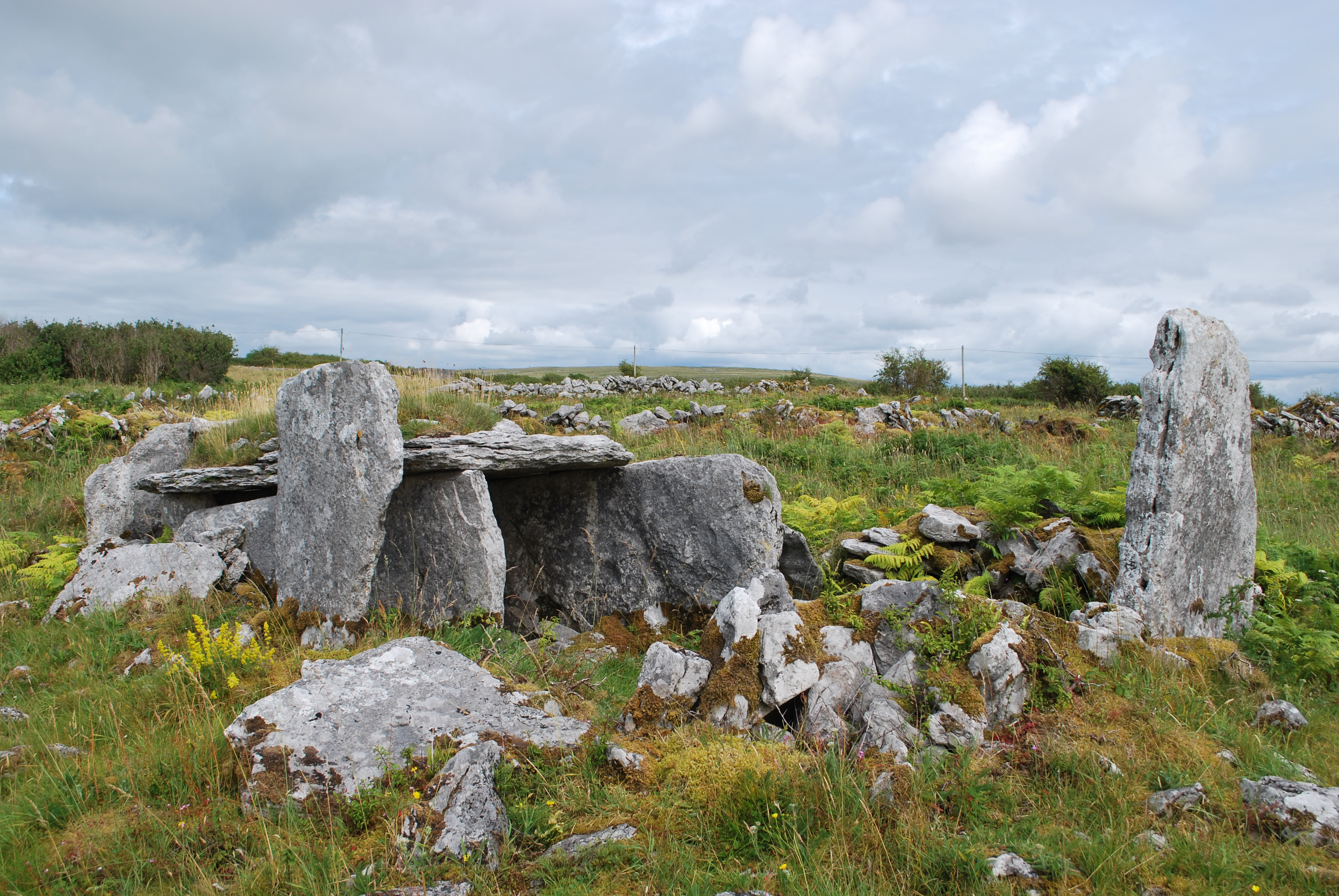

Creevagh wedge tomb is a prehistoric wedge tomb located in the Burren area of County Clare, Ireland.

== Location ==
The tomb is located in the townland of Creevagh, in the parish of Carran, on private property. Roughan Hill, with a large number of other prehistoric structures (tombs, house remains and field walls) including Parknabinnia wedge tomb is about 2.3 km away.

Creevagh is one of eighty wedge tombs in Clare. The largest concentration of them is found on Roughan Hill.

== Description ==
The tomb is wedge-shaped in ground plan, with the widest part facing south west towards the setting sun like all tombs of this type. The setting sun is thus thought to have been of special significance to the builders. This tomb may have included an outer row of stones and may have been modified after its initial construction. It was later enclosed by a stone wall, that was part of the local field wall system. There is a sill stone across the entrance.

No wedge tomb in the Burren has so far been excavated, but they are tentatively dated to 2300 to 2000 BC.

Creevagh tomb was used as a shelter, and inhabited, in the 19th century.
