= Francis G. Neylon =

Irish flute player

Francis G. Neylon

Francis G. Neylon (3 July 1921 – 10 December 1983) was an Irish flute player (concert flute, piccolo) of Irish traditional music. He was inducted into the Comhaltas Ceoltóirí Éireann Hall of Fame for the Northeast Region of the North American Province on 19 February 2000.

Francis G. "Frank" Neylon was born in Kilnaboy, County Clare, Ireland. He played the concert flute with the Kilfenora Ceili Band and also played on Radio Éireann while in Ireland. He came to the United States in July, 1949 and settled first in Cambridge, MA, and then Somerville, MA.

An accomplished Irish musician of the traditional school, self-taught and playing by ear, Neylon won many medals at Feis in Boston and New York City in the 1950s. While in the U.S., he played the concert flute with The Tara Ceili Band, The New State Ceili Band, The Connaught Ceili Band and Comhaltas Ceoltóirí Éireann Hanafin-Cooley branch. He recorded a series of 78 rpm records for the Copley record label with Paddy Cronin, along with other sessions with Joe Derrane and Jerry O’Brien in the early 1950s, and Comhaltas Ceoltóirí Éireann in 1981.
