= Inneenboy cross =

Cross Inneenboy
- Cros Iníne Baoith (Irish)
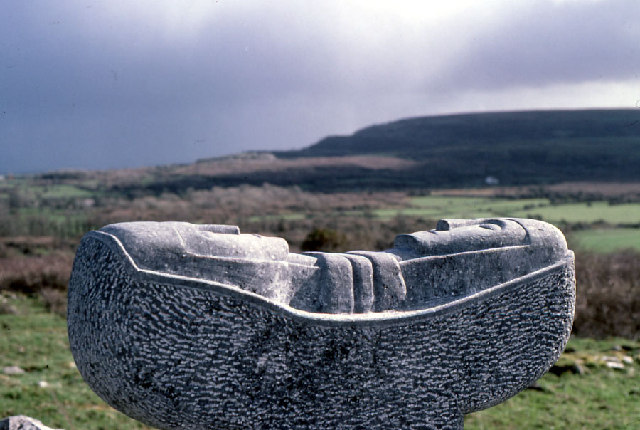
- Replica on Roughan Hill

- Location within Ireland
- 52.977822°N 9.114703°W
- Type: stone tau cross
- Location: Roughan Hill, Kilnaboy, County Clare, Ireland

History
- Built: 12th century AD

Site notes
- Height: 90 cm (3 feet)

National monument of Ireland
- Official name: Tau Cross (Cross Inneenboy)
- Reference no.: 574

The Inneenboy cross (Irish: Cros Iníne Baoith "cross of the daughter of Baoth") or the Roughan Hill Tau Cross is a stone tau cross located in County Clare, Ireland. It is a National Monument.

== Location ==
The cross formerly stood on a large boulder on Roughan Hill, 2 km (1¼ mile) northwest of Kilnaboy; but was later moved several times for safe-keeping, lastly to Clare Heritage & Genealogy Centre in Corofin, where it is now located. A replica has been erected at the original site near the road between Kilnaboy and Leamaneh Castle.

== History and theories ==
The cross was likely erected in the 12th century and served as an ecclesiastical boundary marker (termonn). Reportedly, it was one of three similar structures, but it is the only one whose whereabouts are known today.

Kilnaboy takes its name from the Irish Cill Iníne Baoith, "Church of Baoth's daughter"; the cross is therefore the "Cross of Baoth's daughter." Saint Inneenboy was the patron saint of the Dál gCais.

In 1937, Adolf Mahr, Keeper of Irish Antiquities and Director of the National Museum of Ireland, published a theory that associated the cross with the Celtic double-heads from Roquepertuse, France. In 1940, Joseph Raftery supported this theory, counting the Kilnaboy cross in the same category of La Tène sculptures. Etienne Rynne, however, in an article on the Tau Cross in 1967, compared the craft style of the two carved heads with other works nearby – the immediate area offering three other examples of tau-croziers. He thus showed that the cross was in fact likely a boundary mark of the Romanesque period (12th century) and not a pagan idol of the early Iron Age.

The tau cross is also associated with Saint Anthony the Great, one of the founders of Christian monasticism. There are only eight other similar crosses in Ireland.

Tau crosses feature at several other locations in The Burren, including a carving on the Doorty Cross in Kilfenora. The Kilnaboy cross has been associated in folklore with a reconciliation between the O'Brien and O'Quin families after a feud, but that has been dismissed by antiquarians.

== Description ==
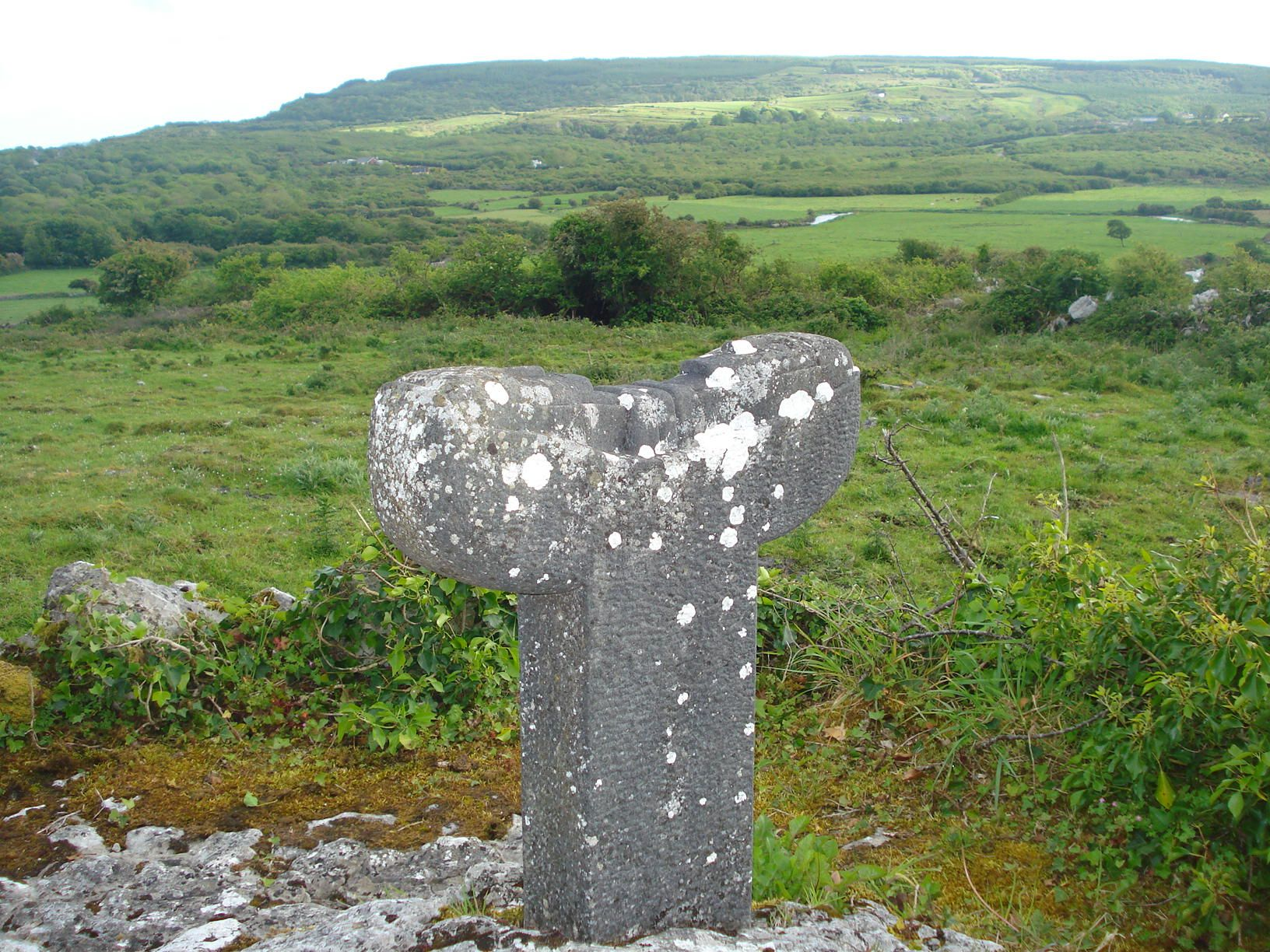
Replica cross in situ.

The cross is carved from a single block of limestone , and on the top of each arm are two heads with two joined hands between them. It has a height of 0.43m and a width of 0.69m.
