= Corofin, County Clare =

Town in County Clare, Ireland

Corofin Cora Finne
- Town
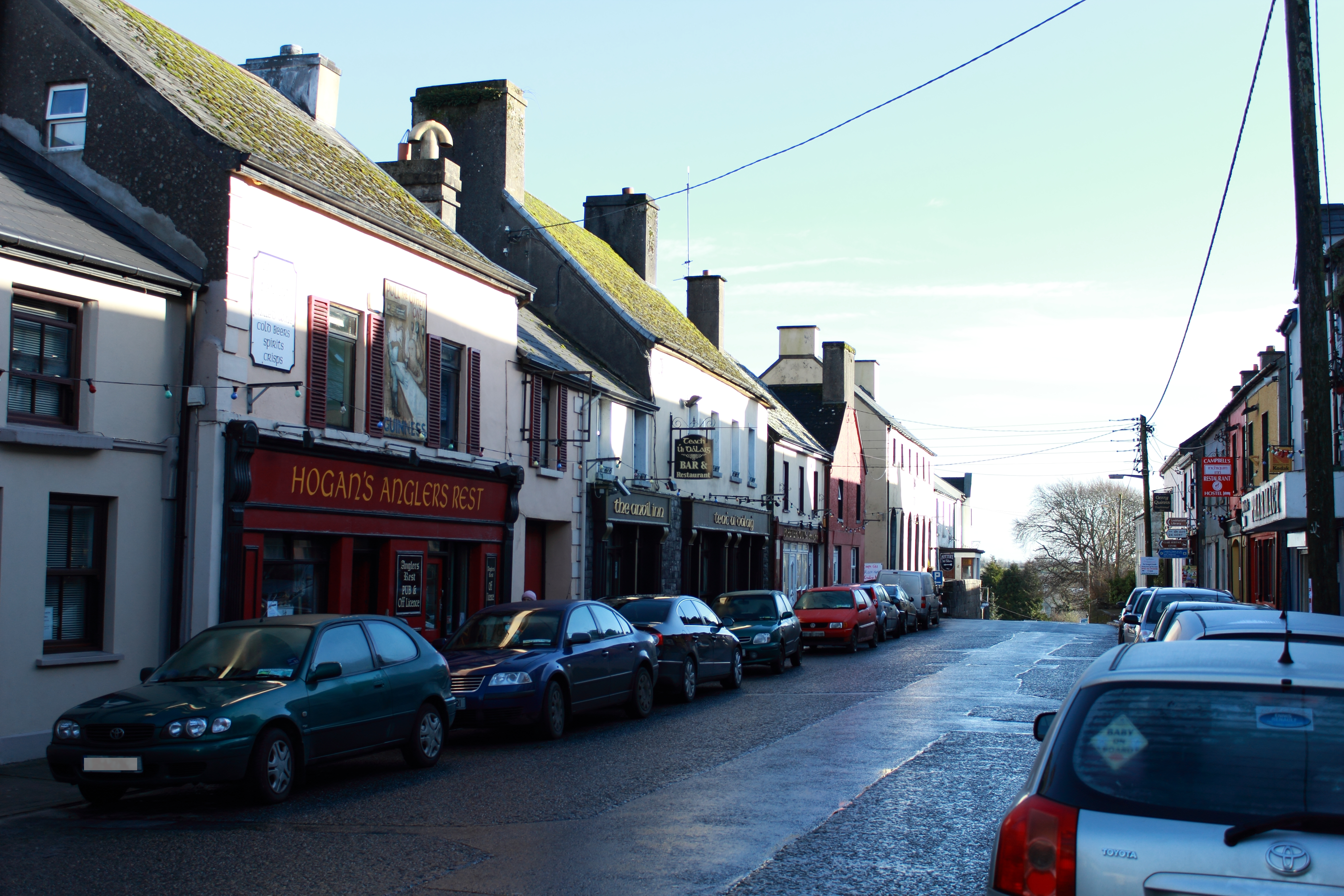
- Main Street

- Location in Ireland
- Coordinates: 52°56′43″N 9°03′43″W
- Country: Ireland
- Province: Munster
- County: County Clare

Population (2022)
  - Total: 793
- Time zone: UTC+0 (WET)
  - Summer (DST): UTC-1 (IST (WEST))
- Irish Grid Reference: R285887

Corofin (Irish: Cora Finne or Coradh Finne) is a town on the River Fergus in northern County Clare, Ireland and also a parish of the same name in the Catholic Diocese of Killaloe. The 2022 population was 793, up from 776 in 2016, and 689 in 2011.

== Name ==
The name Corofin means "the white or foam-flecked ford" from the Irish: Finn Coradh, the earliest form of the name to be found in the literature: "fearann re hucht Finn Coradh". - [Ó hUidhrín, 15c. Topographical Poem] A different translation is "Finne's weir".

The town name is sometimes spelled "Corrofin". Corofin also styles itself as "The Gateway to the Burren" or "The Angler's Paradise".

== Geography ==
The town is 12 km (7.5 mi) north of the county town of Ennis, at the crossroads of the R460 and R476 regional roads. It is on the southern edge of the upland limestone region of The Burren. Corofin is in the civil parish of Kilnaboy in the Barony of Inchiquin. It lies across the townlands of Baunkyle, Laghtagoona and Kilvoydan.

It lies in the parish of the same name of the Roman Catholic Diocese of Killaloe.

== Places of interest ==
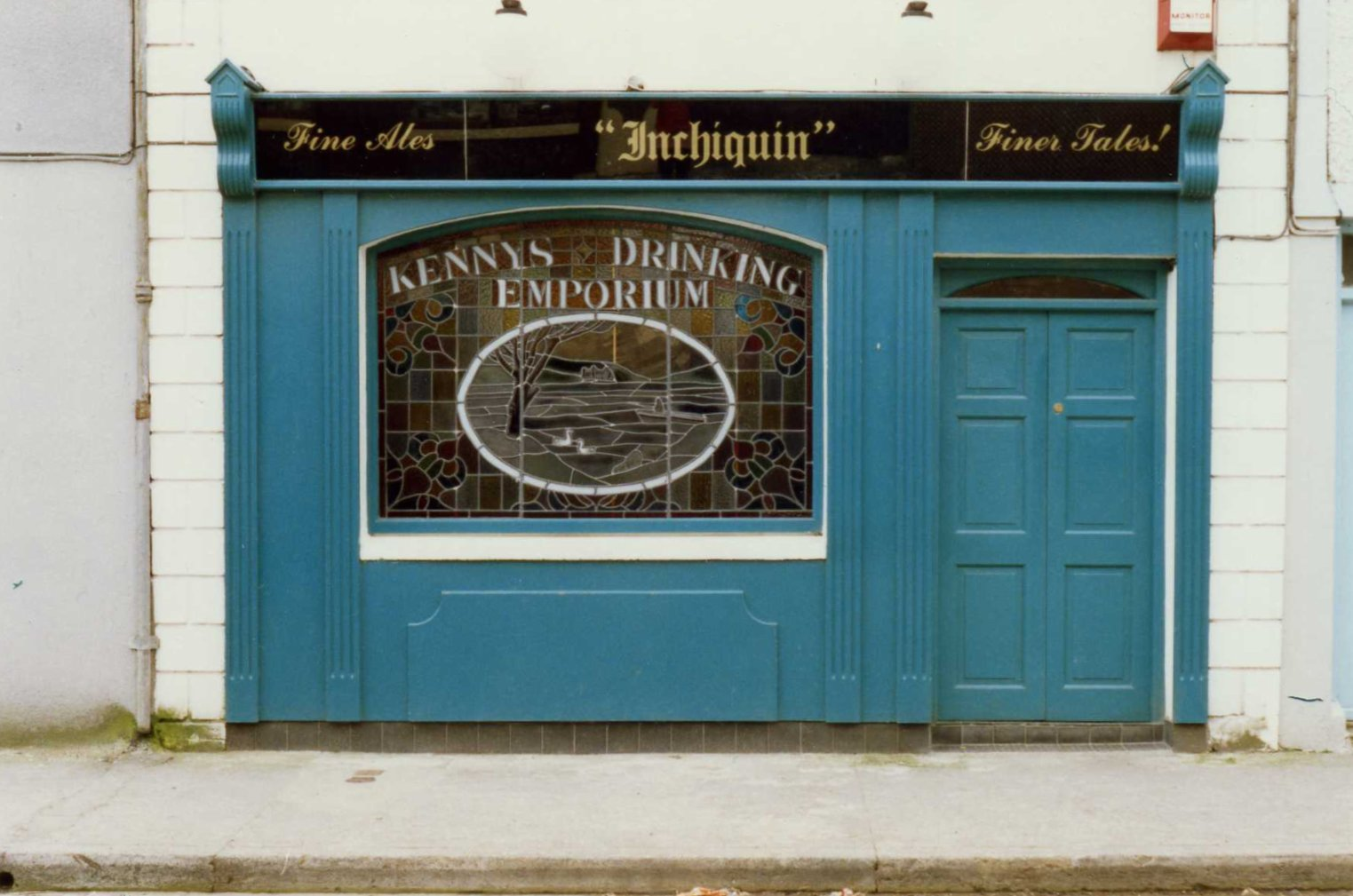
Inchiquin Inn in 1989

On Church Street is the former Church of Ireland, St. Catherine's Church, built between 1715 and 1720 by Catherine Kneightly. It was renovated c. 1820 and by 1829 the steeple had been added. The building is now in use by the Clare Heritage and Genealogical Research Centre. An Irish National Monument, the Cross Inneenboy, also known as Roughan Hill Tau Cross, is a stone tau cross which has been moved into the centre for safe keeping.

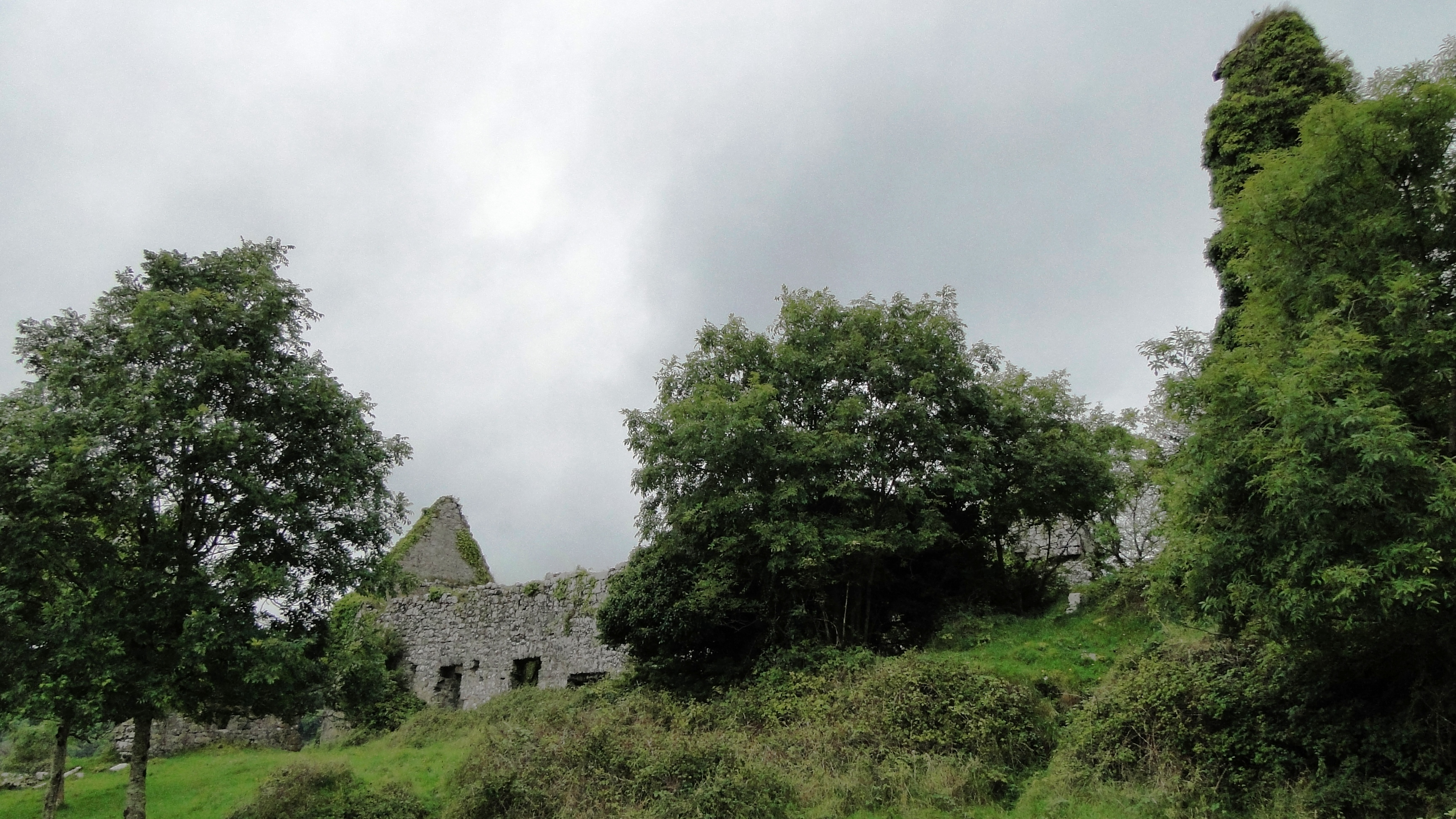
Inchiquin Castle. View of the outside, main building on the left, overgrown tower to the right.

Inchiquin Castle is located just outside the town, on the north side of Lake Inchiquin. It was possibly begun by Teige-an-Chomhaid O'Brien (d. 1466). In 1542, it belonged to Turlough, son of Murrough, first Baron of Inchiquin. Murrough O'Brien, the fourth Baron, was in possession in 1580. His descendants, the Marquesses of Thomond, derived their title of Earl of Inchiquin from this estate. During the Nine Years' War, Hugh Roe O'Donnell raided Clare and Inchiquin Castle was attacked by one of his lieutenants, Maguire of Fermanagh. During the Confederate Wars Christopher O'Brien, Murrough the Burner's brother, lived here. Murrough's son, Colonel John O'Brien, abandoned Inchiquin towards the end of the 17th century. By then it had deteriorated into a ruin. Today the castle remains a ruin surrounded by pastures. Part of the older castle tower is still extant as is a good portion of the later 17th-century banquet hall.

== Town twinning ==
Corofin is twinned with Tonquédec in France.

== Notable people ==
- Chartres Brew, 19th century Gold commissioner, Chief Constable and judge in the Colony of British Columbia
- Frederick William Burton, 19th-century painter and director of the National Gallery, London
- Tony Killeen, (born 1952), Fianna Fáil politician, former Teachta Dála (TD) for the Clare constituency and Minister for Defence
- Benjamin Lucas, soldier of the 17th century
- Gerry Quinn, Hurling left-wing back (born 1980)
- Corofin is the childhood home of painter Frederick William Burton.

== See also ==
- List of towns and villages in Ireland
- O'Dea Castle
- Battle of Dysert O'Dea
