= Termonn =

Land belonging to Irish early Christian institutions

Termonn is a Gaelic (Irish) word meaning 'sanctuary, boundary'. Other spellings include tearmann, tarman and termondd. It denotes land belonging to Irish early Christian monasteries and churches on which right of sanctuary prevailed. The word is common in many place names in Ireland.

== Etymology ==
It is derived from Latin terminus meaning 'goal, end point or boundary'. In ancient Rome, Terminus was the name of the deity who presided over boundaries and landmarks. The placement of termonns in the Irish landscape suggests they were also associated with transit at boundaries across rivers and bays. Cattle and other moveable forms of wealth were often gathered in them, as mentions of raids on termonns attest. Termonns were often marked by stone boundary markers. A famous example is Cross Inneenboy at Roughan Hill near Kilfenora in county Clare.

== Description ==
Termonns were usually on good land and were farmed by the comharba or airchinnech (lay administrator of ecclesiastical land) of the monastery and his fine (extended family). This was a position passed down in a family. Termonn land was exempt from secular taxation. The airchinnech was expected to maintain a guesthouse (bruiden) in exchange for his privileges. The termonn land was often divided into strips called columns (colúnach). For example, in an agreement drawn up in 1568 between members of the coarb family of Dysert it is recorded that: "each freeholder of the sept or lineage of the O'Deas living on the eighteen columns of the said Termon of Dishert must come and build their own houses and keep their respective residences" etc.

== Examples ==
- Termon, the sanctuary, County Donegal
- Tarmonbarry, the sanctuary of (Saint) Berach, County Roscommon
- Termonfeckin, the sanctuary of (Saint) Feichín
- Termmonmaguirk, the sanctuary of the McGurks, Carrickmore, County Tyrone
- Ardtermon, the high sanctuary, originally in the túath of Cairbre Drom Cliabh, now in County Sligo
- Tarmon, County Clare
- Abbey of Tarmon, Drumkeeran, County Leitrim
