= Caheraphuca Wedge Tomb =

Gallery grave in County Clare, Ireland

- Tuama Dinge Chathair an Phúca (Irish)
- Location within Ireland
- 52.934612°N 8.904909°W
- Type: wedge-shaped gallery grave
- Location: Caheraphuca, Crusheen, County Clare, Ireland

History
- Built: c. 2250 BC

National monument of Ireland
- Official name: Caheraphuca Wedge Tomb
- Reference no.: 466

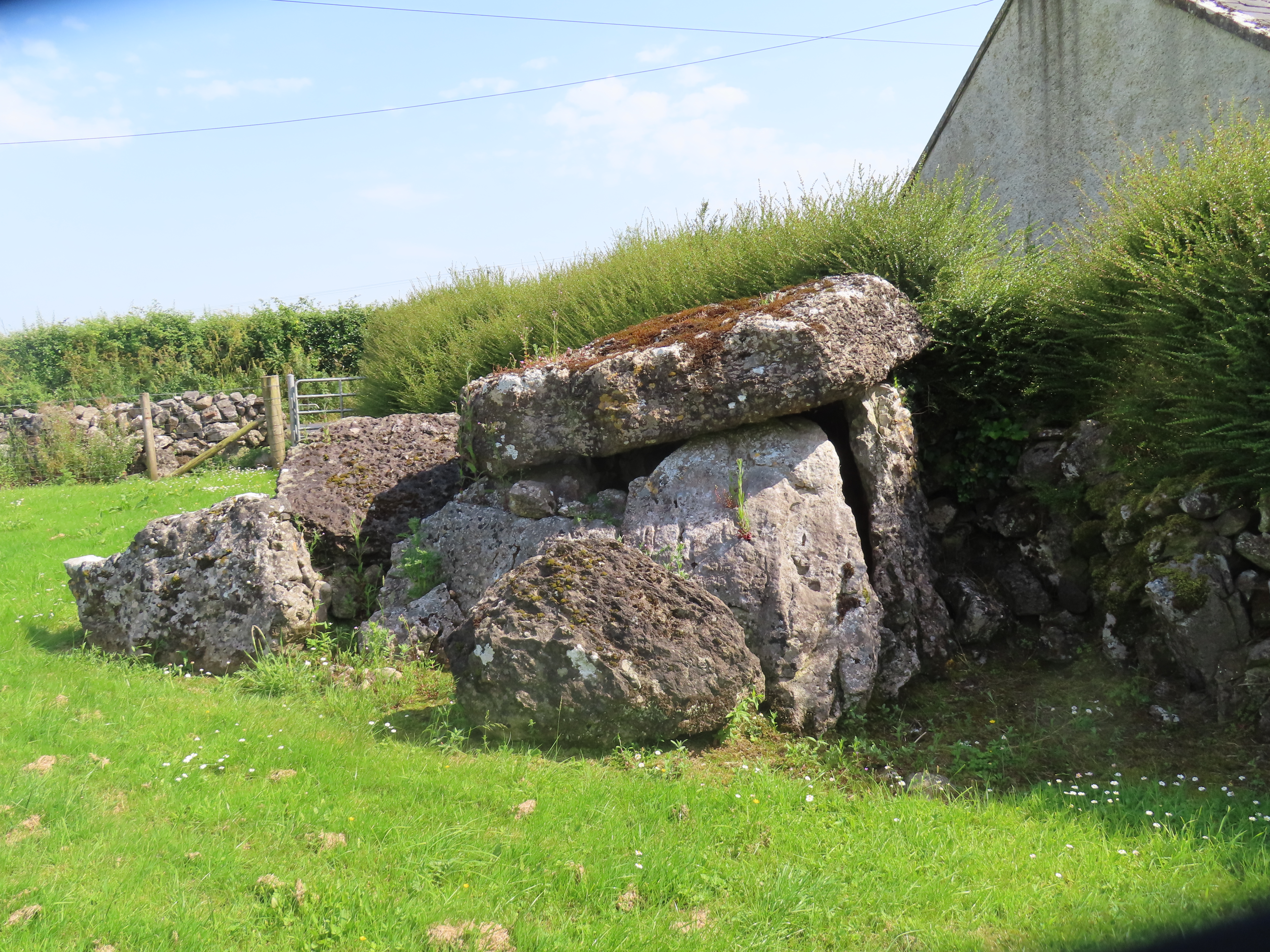
Caheraphuca (Co. Clare) Wedge Tomb

The Caheraphuca Wedge Tomb is a wedge-shaped gallery grave and National Monument located near Crusheen in County Clare, Ireland.

== Location ==
Caheraphuca wedge tomb is located in Caheraphuca townland of Inchicronan parish, immediately southwest of Crusheen, to the north of Inchicronan Lough.

== History ==
Wedge tombs of this kind were built in Ireland in the late Neolithic and early Bronze Age, c. 2500–2000 BC. The name derives from Irish cathair an phúca, "dwelling of the púca."

== Description ==
A long chamber of five stones supports two roofstones; these may originally have been a single roofstone that was later broken.
