= Tullycommon Wedge Tomb =

- Tuama Dinge Thulach Chumann (Irish)
- Dermot & Grania's Bed
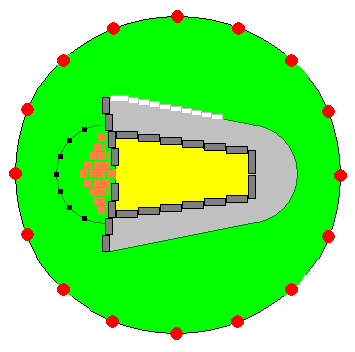
- Computer graphic of a wedge tomb

- Location within Ireland
- 53.025422°N 9.058380°W
- Type: wedge-shaped gallery grave
- Location: Tullycommon, Kilnaboy, County Clare, Ireland

History
- Built: c. 2250 BC

National monument of Ireland
- Official name: Tullycommon Wedge Tomb
- Reference no.: 270

The Tullycommon Wedge Tomb is a wedge-shaped gallery grave and National Monument located in The Burren region of County Clare, Ireland.

== Location ==
Tullycommon wedge tomb is located in the eponymous townland in Kilnaboy parish, 1.8 km (1.1 mi) southeast of Carran, between Knockaun Fort (with souterrain) and a caher.

== History ==
Wedge tombs of this kind were built in Ireland in the late Neolithic and early Bronze Age, c. 2500–2000 BC.

== Description ==
Tullycommon Wedge Tomb is aligned approx SW-NE, receiving the light of the setting sun. It is a box-like structure with two long sidestones and a capstone. The gallery is just 1.7 m in length and 80 cm high.

At the rear two shorter side stones flank the back stone. Just beyond the end of the chamber is an outer back stone.
