= Ballyhickey Wedge Tomb =

- Tuama Dinge Bhaile Uí Icí (Irish)
- Location within Ireland
- 52.834305°N 8.855522°W
- Type: wedge-shaped gallery grave
- Location: Ballyhickey, Quin, County Clare, Ireland

History
- Built: c. 2500–2000 BC

Site notes
- Elevation: 41 m (135 ft)

National monument of Ireland
- Official name: Ballyhickey Wedge Tomb
- Reference no.: 484

Ballyhickey Wedge Tomb is a wedge-shaped gallery grave and National Monument located in County Clare, Ireland.

== Location ==
Ballyhickey Wedge Tomb is located in the Rine River valley, 2 km north of Quin and immediately south of Clooney-Quin GAA grounds.

== History ==
Wedge tombs of this kind were built in Ireland in the early Bronze Age, c. 2500–2000 BC.

== Description ==
A wedge tomb complete with orthostats and roofstones.
