= Cahercommaun =

Ringfort in County Clare, Ireland

- Cathair Chomáin
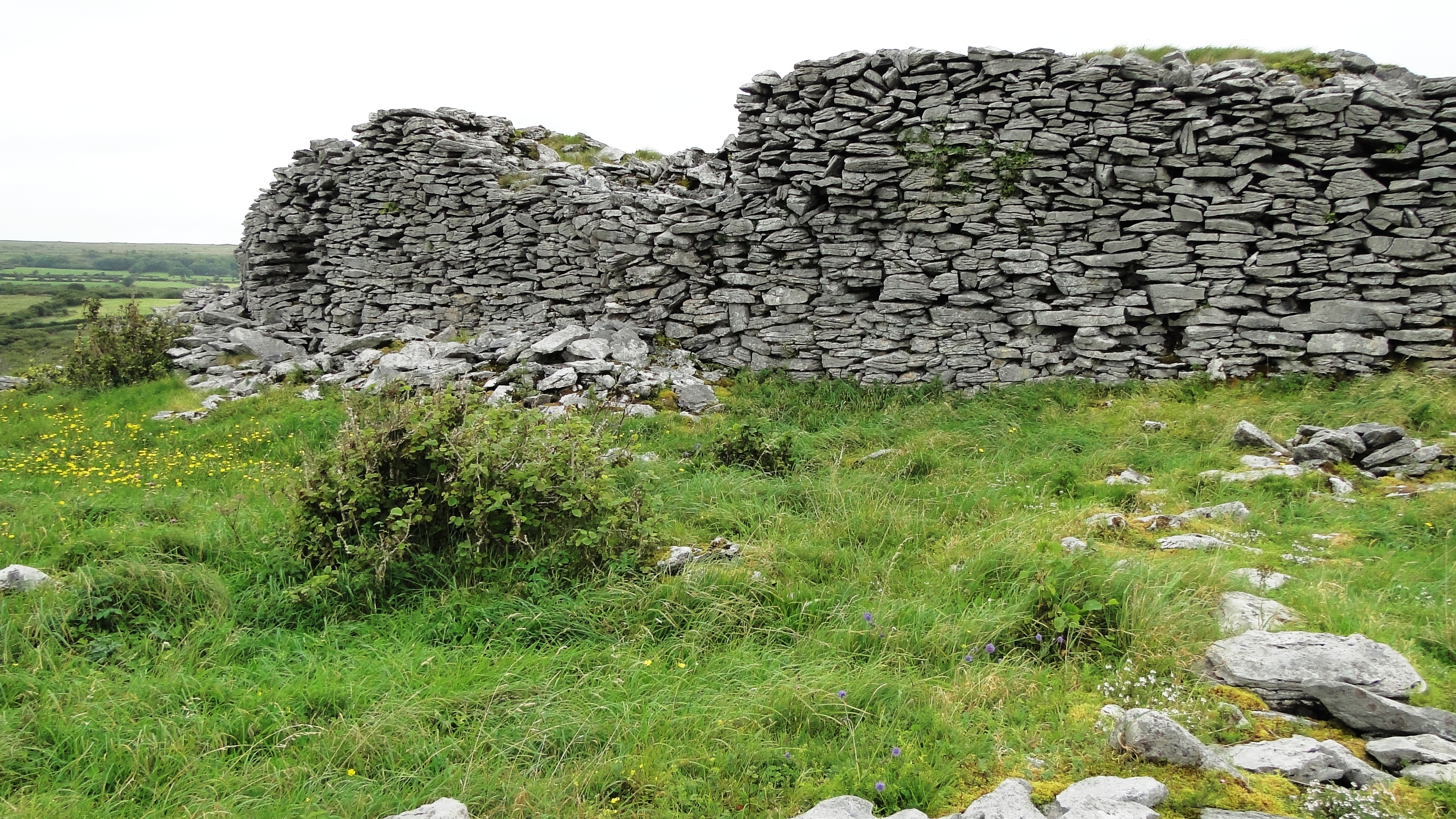
- Detail of part of the inner wall

- Location within Ireland
- 53.014722°N 9.070556°W
- Type: Ringfort
- Periods: early Medieval
- Location: Parish of Kilnaboy, the Burren
- Region: Ireland

Site notes
- Material: limestone
- Excavation dates: 1934 (Harvard Archaeological Expedition); 2003
- Archaeologists: Hugh O'Neill Hencken
- Owner: Public
- Public access: Yes

National monument of Ireland
- Reference no.: 270

Cahercommaun (Irish: Cathair Chomáin), sometimes Cahercommane is a triple stone ringfort on the south-east edge of the Burren area, in Kilnaboy, near the rural village of Carran, in County Clare, Ireland. It was built in the 9th century.

== Features ==
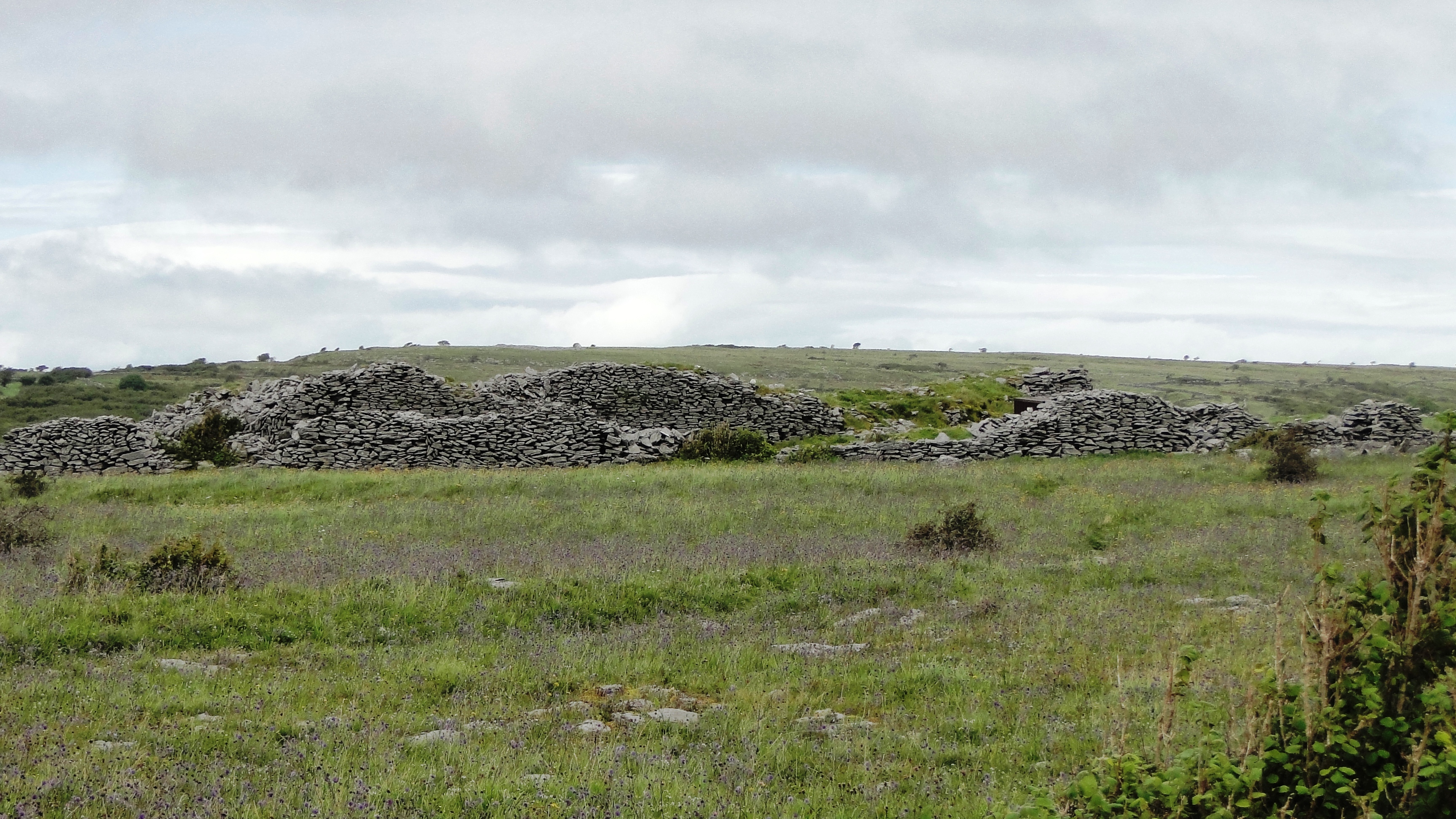
Inner and outer wall of Cahercommaun ringfort

Cahercommaun sits on the edge of an inland cliff facing north overlooking a wooded valley, with three concentric walls reaching to the cliff edge. The inner wall alone used 16,500 tons of stone. The outer wall measures some 350 ft east-west by 245 ft north-south. The inner wall is about 5 ft thick and 4 ft high and rises 12 to 14 feet above the cliff. The innermost wall, which is the thickest, forms an almost complete circle, but the two outer walls (connected with each other by subsidiary walls, like a fan) only form a semicircle. The innermost wall contains three chambers within the wall.

== Excavations ==
In a six-week period in 1934 it was excavated by the Third Harvard Archaeological Expedition, led by Hugh O'Neill Hencken, which found that the roughly circular enclosure contained at least twelve stone buildings at various times, some of which had souterrains. The archaeologists concluded that Cahercommaun would have been home to a group of at least 40 people, and among the artefacts discovered were wooden spindles used in weaving. A silver brooch found in one of the souterrains indicates that the site was already in existence by the 9th century AD. The brooch, similar in design to the Tara brooch, is in the National Museum of Ireland in Dublin. In addition to the brooch, a padlock was found.

Some of the conclusions drawn from the work of the Harvard expedition, especially on the period in which the fort was inhabited, have since been revised in light of new information, but the 1934 excavation provided a valuable starting point and basis for further work.

The excavation uncovered one of the most important Iron Age collections found in Ireland. From the collection, a set of sheep shears and a saddle quern are on loan to the Clare Museum from the Irish Antiquities Division of the National Museum of Ireland. Evidence was found of settlement dating back to the 5th century and 6th century, although the fort was built during the 9th century. The saddle quern dates from the Late Neolithic/Early Bronze Age period.

== Chiefdom of Tulach Commáin ==
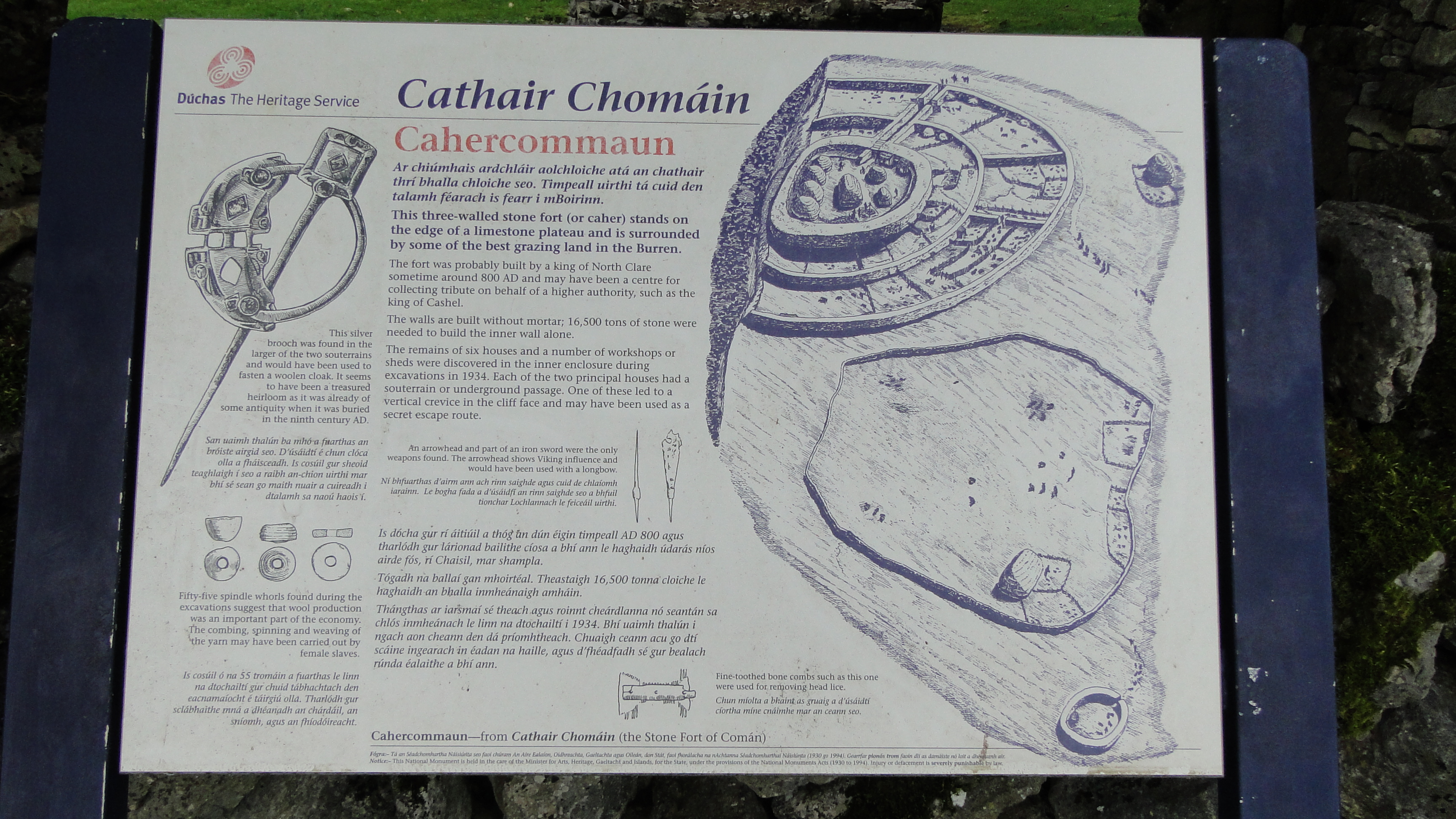
Public info sign near the access to Cahercommaun ringfort, showing what the fort probably looked like when in use

Archaeologists today think that the fort served as the central settlement of the Chiefdom of Tulach Commáin "The Mound of Commán" a once locally revered chief, anglicised to Commane" (possibly) of the kingdom of Cashel which controlled or heavily influenced large parts of the Burren in the 9th century. The site was clearly occupied before that period - as was most of the surrounding countryside, which shows numerous signs of habitation since prehistoric times. Whether the exact spot on which the fort now stands was in use earlier is impossible to verify. However, the 5th/6th century artefacts found indicate the presence in that period of at least a small group of people. Hencken thought this number to have reached around 40 to 50 at its peak. There are no signs of occupation past the 10th century.

Although Hencken assumed two phases of occupation, today three phases are distinguished. Phase A covers the period from the 5th/6th to the 8th century. These settlers likely occupied a small enclosure surrounding several small structures near the cliff wall, at the northern end of the current inner wall. No clear evidence of this enclosure has been found, however, as it may have been demolished or incorporated into later structures. The only findings attributed to this period are a number of small metal pins and brooches. Phase B refers to the peak in the 9th century, from which the present walls all date. The souterrains were built during this phase. The entranceway to the fort was a paved passage flanked by walls and penetrating the inner wall through an 8-m-long tunnel with a ceiling of large capstones. The inner walls were terraced and likely much higher than they are now.

The presence of three walls has led some to view Cahercommaun as a "Royal" residence. This is not supported by the structures and findings, however. Whilst the innermost wall is clearly defensive in nature, both outer walls are too poorly constructed and flimsy to offer much military value. In conjunction with the radial walls (see drawing on the info sign) they seem to have served a domestic rather than defensive purpose. There is also not much in way of findings to support a "high status" theory of the inhabitants. No gold was found except in minute traces used for decoration on other materials. Except for the silver brooch, "jewellery" was made from iron, copper, bone and glass. What has been found in large quantities are animal bones, of sheep, goat, pig, horse, deer and others but dominantly cattle (97% by weight). These were scattered inside the fort and together with other accumulated materials had raised the floor level by around 1.5 meters above the bedrock. Numerous tools (iron knives and shears, 55 spindle whorls) were also found, indicating the presence of a self-sufficient (wool?) production centre here throughout phase B.

After phase B ended, possibly after less than a century, in phase C the entry passage was realigned to a new building set up in the centre of the inner wall circle. Circular structures from phase B seem to have been replaced with the use of rectangular buildings. By that stage, enough material has accumulated inside the inner wall that the lowest terraces were now at floor level and hearths were built on them.

The fort was abandoned sometime in the 10th century. One interpretation of the findings is that Cahercommaun served an important role in the collection of tribute and patronage that was crucial to the working of the small kingdoms of the time. A once dominant but later defeated and coopted clan like the Ui Chormaic may have used the structure as a location for collecting cattle tribute prior to their delivery to the ultimate recipient, such as the Corcu Modruadh. The abandonment in the 10th century may tie in with the rise of the Dál gCais, who rose to dominance in the Burren around that time.

== See also ==
- History of Ireland (800–1169).
