= Carran =

Village in County Clare, Ireland

Carran An Carn
- Village
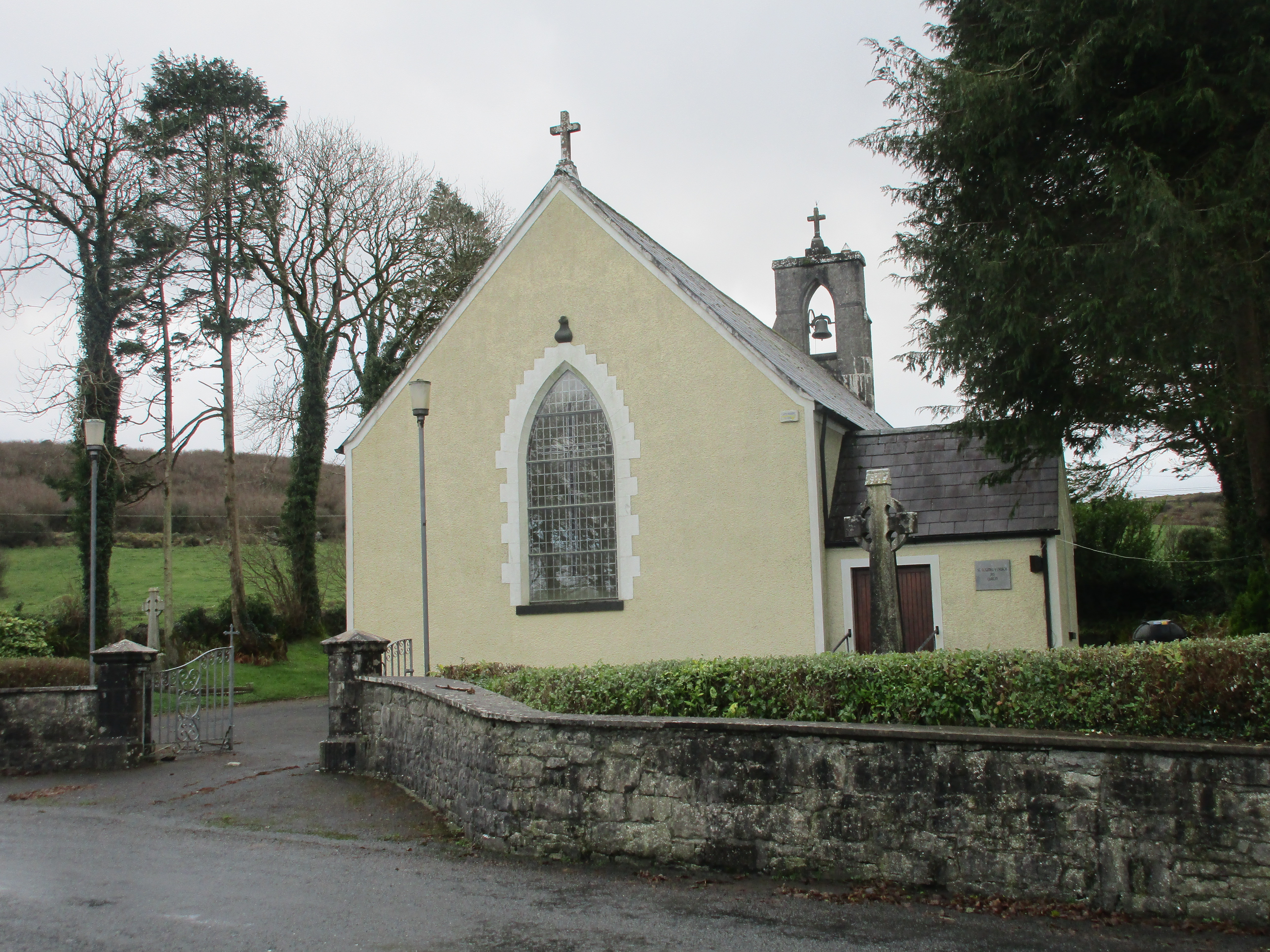
- St. Columba's Church

- Location in Ireland
- Coordinates: 53°02′06″N 9°04′35″W
- Country: Ireland
- Province: Munster
- County: County Clare

Population (2011)
  - Total: 106
- Time zone: UTC+0 (WET)
  - Summer (DST): UTC-1 (IST (WEST))
- Irish Grid Reference: R277992

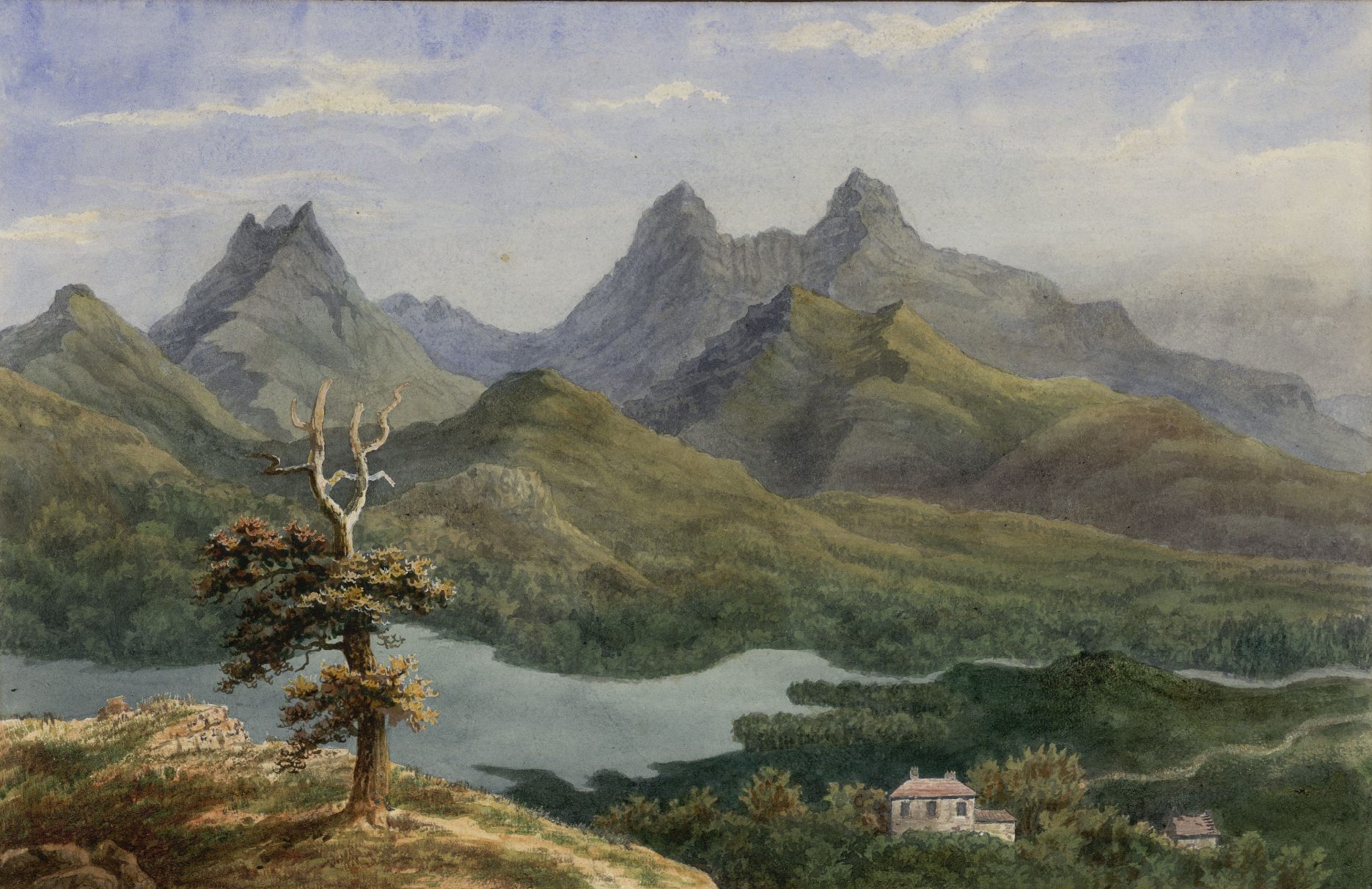
Carran painted in the first half of the 19th century by a travelling French artist

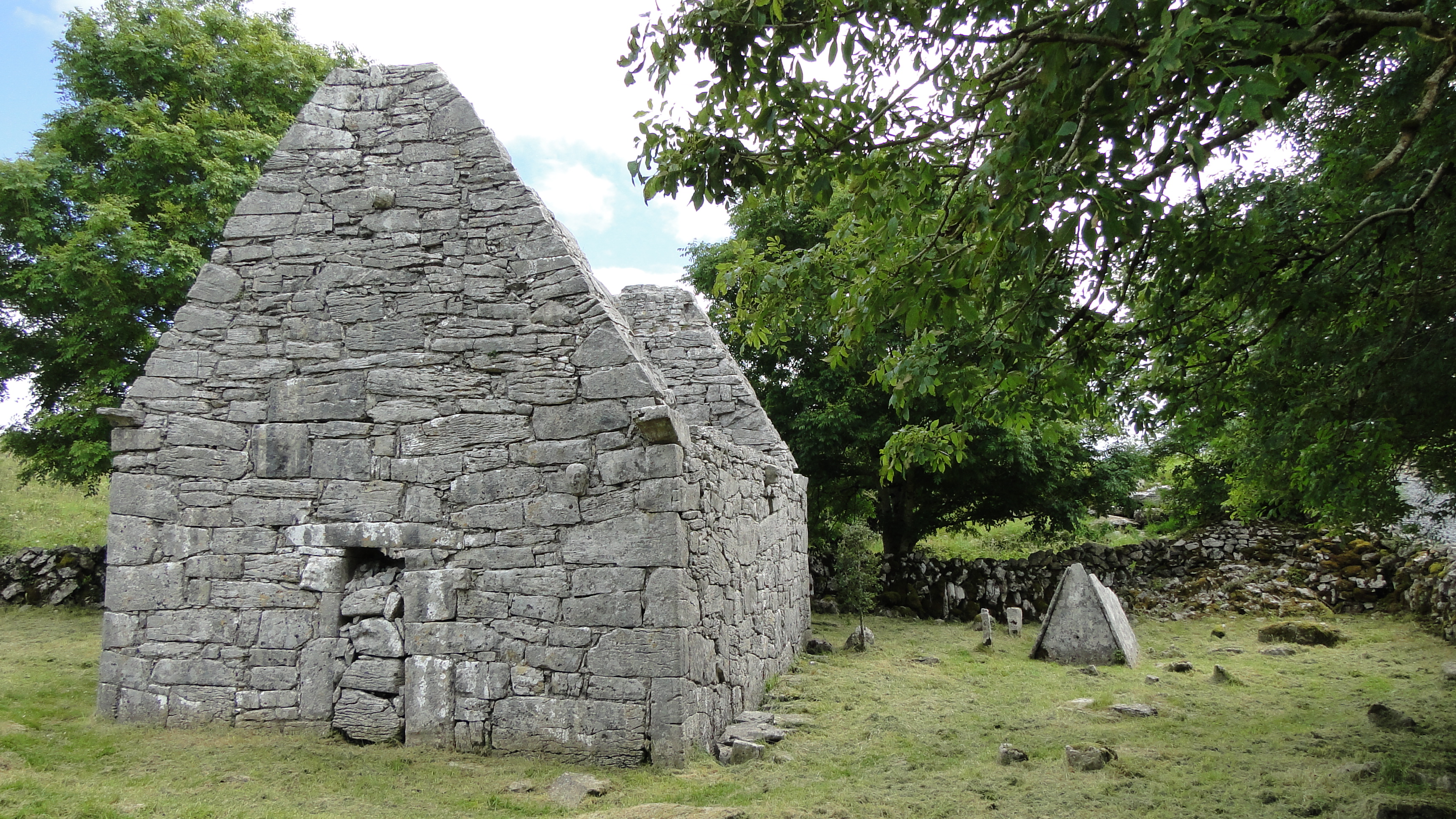
Temple Cronan

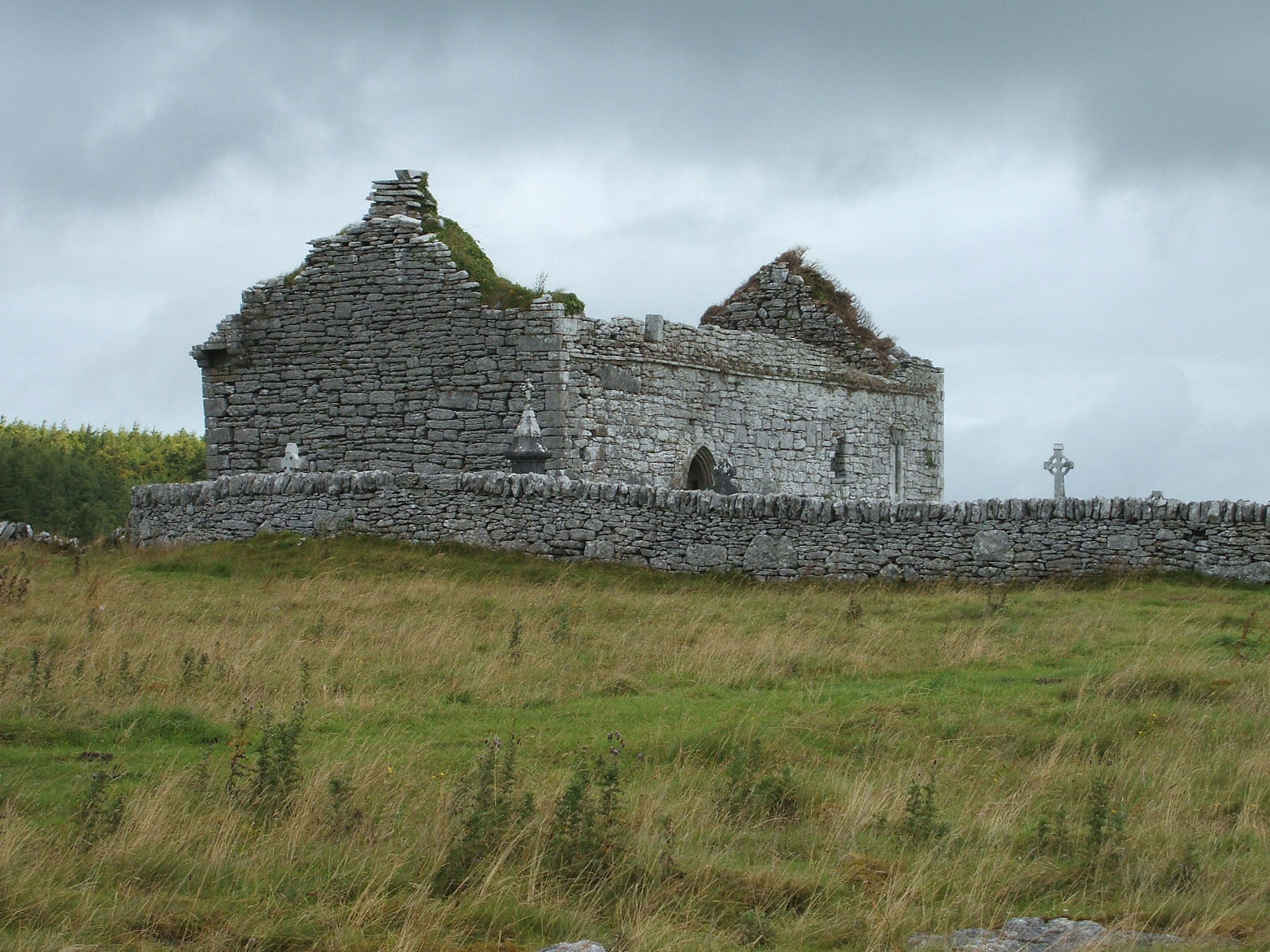
Carran church

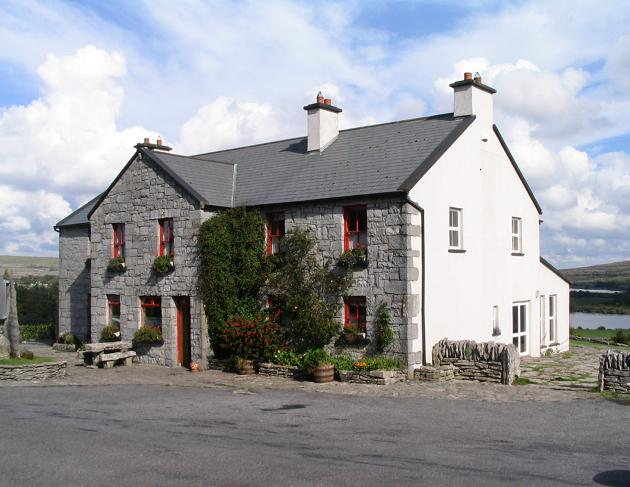
Cassidy's

Carran (Irish: An Carn, meaning 'the cairn'), also Carron, is a small village in County Clare, Ireland. It is in the Burren region, within a civil parish of the same name. It is notable mainly for being the birthplace of Michael Cusack, the inspirer and co-founder of the Gaelic Athletic Association. At the time of the 2011 Census, Carran had 106 inhabitants.

== Geography ==
Carran parish is located on the uplands of the Burren and is bounded on the northwest by County Galway and on the south by Kilnaboy. Slieve Carran, one of the highest points in the Burren, lies north of the village.

The land is mainly rocky pasture with much limestone. In the past there were copper mines. It is said that Saint Columb founded an abbey at Glanculmkil, later to become the parish church. An 1837 account said this church was in ruins, and there were the remains of two other old churches at Crunane and Glanculmkil. A stone bed is called Saint Columb's bed, and nearby is a spring of fine water.

The parish contains the townlands of Ballyconry, Ballydoora, Ballyline, Cahermackirilla, Cahergrillaun, Cappagh, Cappaghkennedy, Carran, Castletown, Clab, Clooncoose, Commons, Coolnatullagh, Coskeam, Creevagh, Crughwill, Fahee North, Fahee South, Fanygalvan, Glencolumbkille North, Glencolumbkille South, Iskancullin, Keelhilla, Knockans Lower, Knockans Upper, Meggagh East, Meggagh West, Mogouhy, Moheramoylan, Moheraroon, Moygowna, Poulacarran, Poulaphuca, Poulawack, Poulcaragharush, Pullagh, Rannagh East, Rannagh West, Sheshodonnell East, Sheshodonnell West, Sladoo and Termon.

== Economy ==
In the village itself, a pub/restaurant (Cassidy's), a hostel, and a number of bed and breakfasts can be found. It also sports a church, a schoolhouse (built in 1858) and a town hall. The schoolhouse now is used by the "Burrenlife Project".

The number of inhabitants was 106 at the time of the 2011 Census, down from 115 in 2006.

Carran is located centrally to a number of tourist sights: Within eight kilometres of the village are several stone forts, Poulnabrone dolmen, a turlough (disappearing lake) and limestone scenery ("pavement"). There is also Gleann Ciosog (a Gaelic Athletic Association pitch for the local football team Michael Cusacks). Carran was the birthplace of Michael Cusack, the inspirer and co-founder of the Gaelic Athletic Association. A visitor centre commemorating him has been constructed south of the village on road L1014.

East of the village is a Field Research Station, opened in 1975 by University College Galway (now NUI Galway). A bit beyond is the "Burren Perfumery", according to Lonely Planet the "only handycraft perfumery in Ireland".

In addition, the area offers walking trails like the "Carran loop" or around the Carran turlough and scenic views over the Burren.

== Places of interest ==
- Carran church (Teampull a'Chairn), located on the road between Leamaneh Castle and Ballyvaughan, is a ruin that measures 19 metres in length and 7 metres in breadth. The west end contains a (broken) belfry at the top and the south end has a pointed doorway and two windows, one of which is pointed and the other which is broken. These features indicate a construction date in the 15th century. The east end contains another pointed window broad on the inside and narrow on the outside. There seem to have been living quarters for the priest above the ground floor worship area. A broken stone altar remains under this window and at the left corner is a holy water font. In the north wall were three corbels decorated with carved heads, two males and one female. Only one of these heads now remains, two were removed in the 1970s. The remaining head wears a kind of hood or helmet or basinet indicating a carving from the late 14th or early 15th century.
- The cliff-bound valley of Kilcorney, 7 kilometres away, is characteristic of the area.
- Not far from the village is Temple Cronan, a 12th-century church. The west end of the church has some grotesque Romanesque heads on its exterior wall. In the churchyard there are two Cumdachs for bones, according to tradition built by St. Cronan. They are constructed from large flagstones, so placed as to meet at the top similar to a roof. West of the church is the holy well, Tobar Chronain, at which stations are performed.
- In Keelhilla townland lies the hermitage of Colman mac Duagh, a pilgrimage destination since medieval times and the site of a small oratory and several other antiquities.
- Also situated in the parish is Poulawack Cairn (Poll an Bhaic, The Hole of the Angle), a Neolithic/Bronze Age burial site excavated first by the Harvard Archaeological Expedition of 1934.
- Cahercommaun triple stone fort in the neighbouring Parish of Kilnaboy, is also close to Carran.
- Another ring fort in the area is Caherconnell.
- Creevagh wedge tomb is located in the parish.
- Cashlaungar, a stone ringfort located 2.7 km to the south of Carran.

== See also ==
- List of towns and villages in Ireland
