= Inchiquin Lough =

Freshwater lake in the Mid-West Region of Ireland

- Loch Inse Uí Chuinn (Irish)
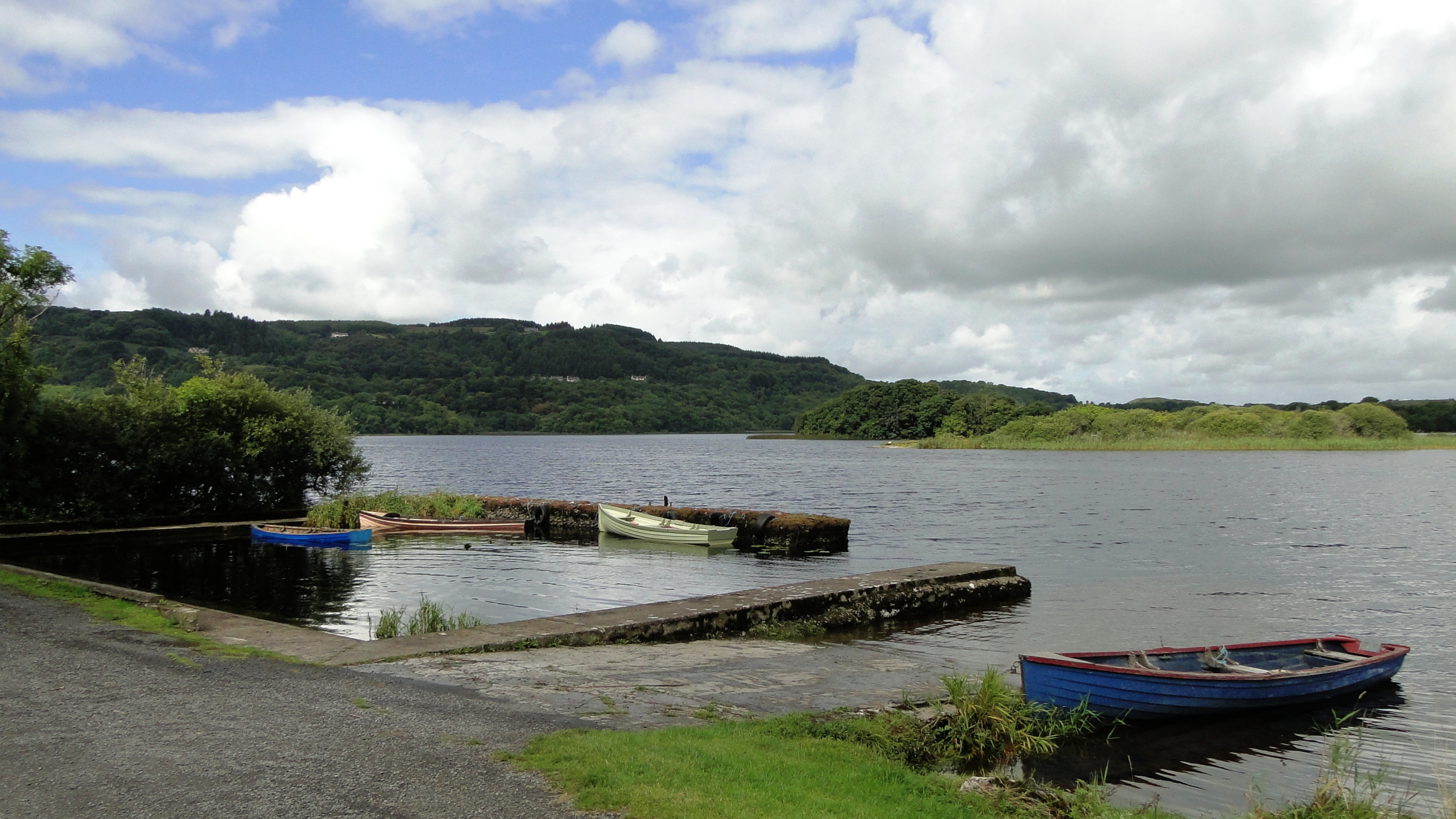

- Location in Ireland
- Location: County Clare
- Coordinates: 52°57′10″N 9°5′16″W
- Primary inflows: River Fergus
- Primary outflows: River Fergus
- Catchment area: 135.58 km^{2} (52.3 sq mi)
- Basin countries: Ireland
- Max. length: 1.6 km (1.0 mi)
- Max. width: 1.3 km (0.8 mi)
- Surface area: 1.08 km^{2} (0.42 sq mi)
- Max. depth: 25 m (82 ft)
- Surface elevation: 19 m (62 ft)

Inchiquin Lough (Irish: Loch Inse Uí Chuinn) is a freshwater lake in the Mid-West Region of Ireland. It is located in The Burren of County Clare.

== Geography and hydrology ==
Inchiquin Lough measures about 1.5 km (0.9 mi) long and 1 km (0.6 mi) wide. It is about 15 km (9 mi) north of Ennis near the village of Corofin. The lake lies along the River Fergus.

== Natural history ==
Fish species in Inchiquin Lough include brown trout, pike, rudd, perch, tench. The lake is part of the East Burren Complex Special Area of Conservation.

== See also ==
- List of loughs in Ireland
