= List of people with surname O'Dea =

O'Dea
- Language: English, from Irish

Origin
- Derivation: Ó Deághaidh
- Meaning: Descendant of Deághaidh (an Irish chieftain)
- Region of origin: County Clare, Ireland

O'Dea is a surname of Irish origin. The original Irish language surname from which it derives is Ó Deághaidh.

The following is a list of notable people with the surname O'Dea.

== Arts ==
- Addison O'Dea – American documentary filmmaker
- Danny O'Dea – British actor
- Darrell O'Dea – Canadian musician and recording engineer
- Denis O'Dea – Irish actor
- Jimmy O'Dea – Irish actor and comedian
- Judith O'Dea – American film actress
- Mark O'Dea – British television presenter
- Mick O'Dea – Irish painter
- Stephanie O'Dea – American food and lifestyle writer

== Clergy ==
- Cornelius O'Dea – Irish bishop
- Edward John O'Dea – American bishop
- Thomas O'Dea – Irish bishop

== Military ==
- Jane Skiles O'Dea – American navy officer
- John O'Dea – American Civil War soldier

== Politics ==
- Ernest Charles O'Dea – Australian politician and union official
- Fabian O'Dea – Lieutenant Governor of Newfoundland, Canada
- John R. O'Dea – Canadian businessman and politician
- Jonathan O'Dea – Australian politician
- Louis O'Dea – Irish politician
- Michael O'Dea – Irish politician
- Michael O'Dea – Australian politician
- Richard W. O'Dea - American politician
- Tom O'Dea – American attorney and politician
- Willie O'Dea – Irish politician

== Sport ==
- Ben O'Dea – New Zealand beach volleyball player
- Bob O'Dea – New Zealand rugby player
- Darren O'Dea – Irish football manager and player
- Donnacha O'Dea – Irish Olympic swimmer and professional poker player
- Ebony O'Dea – Australian rules football player
- Jim O'Dea – Australian rules football player
- Ken O'Dea – American baseball player
- Kevin O'Dea – American football coach
- Larry O'Dea – Australian wrestler and promoter
- Luke O'Dea – Irish rugby player
- Luke O'Dea – Australian football player
- Pat O'Dea – Australian and American football player and coach
- Paul O'Dea – American basketball player
- Steve O'Dea – Australian rugby player
- Terry O'Dea – Australian darts player
- Tom O'Dea – Irish football player
- Trent O'Dea – Australian volleyball player

== Other ==
- Ann O'Dea – Irish journalist and businesswoman
- Brian O'Dea – Canadian smuggler and author
- Patrick O'Dea – New Zealand civil servant
