= Dysert O'Dea =

Dysert O'Dea may refer to:

- Dysert, County Clare, a civil parish in County Clare, Ireland
- Dysert O'Dea Monastery, an early Christian monastery in County Clare, Ireland
- Dysert O'Dea Castle, a fortified tower house beside Dysert O'Dea Monastery
- Battle of Dysert O'Dea (10 May 1318), a battle fought during the Bruce campaign in Ireland
