= Saint Paul Central High School =

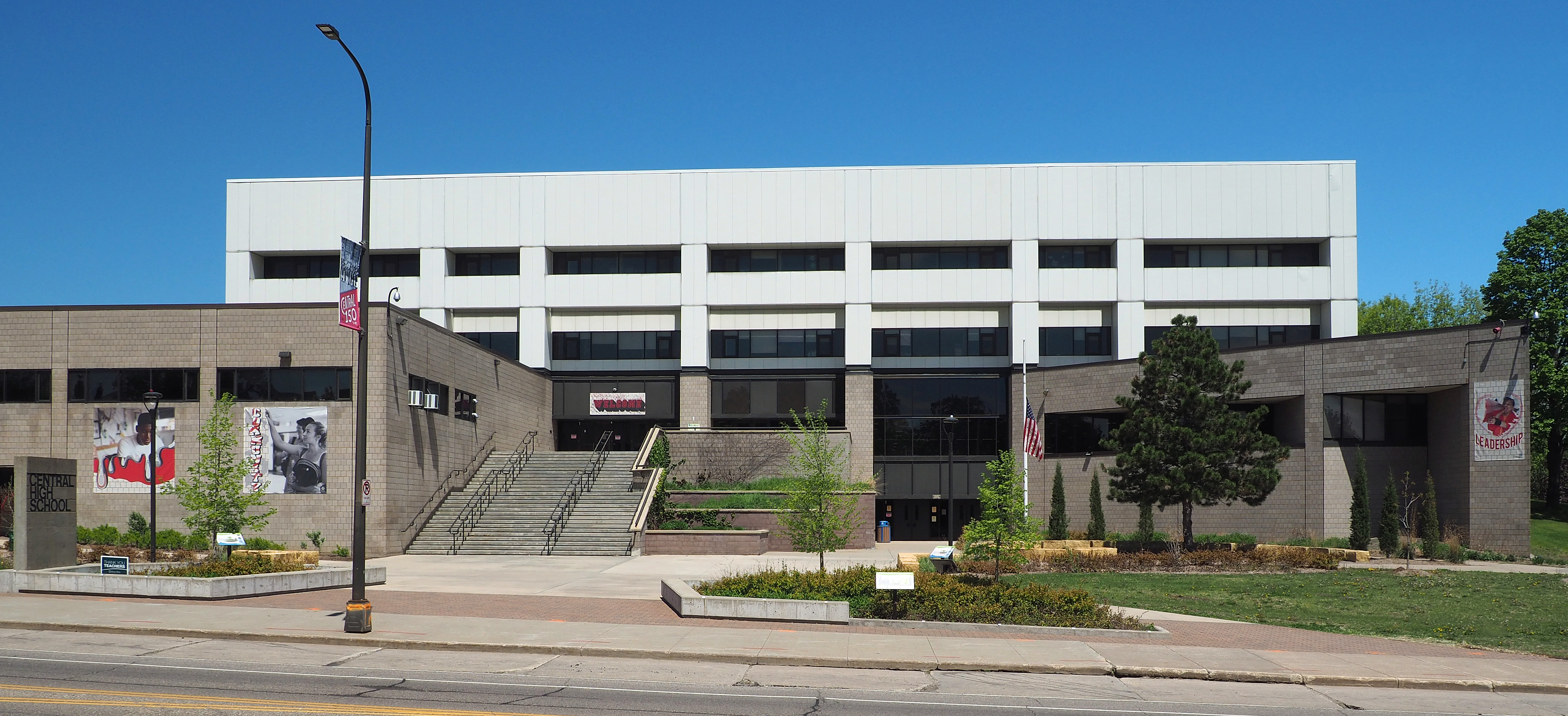
- Saint Paul Central High School from the south

Location
- 275 Lexington Parkway North; Saint Paul, Minnesota 55104; United States; 44°56′58″N 93°8′52″W

Information
- Type: Public
- Motto: "Many traditions, one school."
- Established: 1866
- School district: Saint Paul Public Schools
- Principal: Cherise Ayers
- Staff: 73.62 (FTE)
- Grades: 9–12
- Enrollment: 1,574 (2023–2024)
- Student to teacher ratio: 21.38
- Campus: Urban
- Colors: Red and black
- Mascot: Minuteman
- Newspaper: Minute By Minute (formerly Central High Times)
- Yearbook: CEHISEAN
- Website: central.spps.org

Saint Paul Central High School is the oldest continuously operating high school in the state of Minnesota, United States. Founded in 1866 in downtown Saint Paul, Central has educated many leaders in business, government, literature, arts, sciences, and education throughout the state of Minnesota and the United States.

It is also one of the biggest high schools in the state and, as of 2011, the second-largest in the city of Saint Paul, after Harding Senior High School on the east side of the city. It is also a national Blue Ribbon School.

== History ==
Central High School has been situated in four locations, beginning with the first building in 1866.

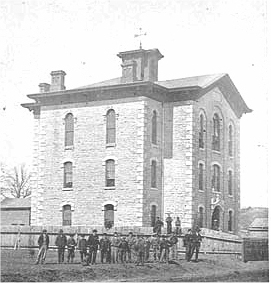
First Central High School: Saint Paul High School, 3rd floor of the Franklin School building (2 rooms), Broadway and Tenth Streets, 1866–1872. Photo dated 1865.

=== 1866 (third floor of Franklin School Building) ===
Central High School was founded in 1866 in response to student requests. Before 1866, there were no educational opportunities in Saint Paul beyond grade school. About a dozen students wished to continue their schooling so, in 1866, two rooms were set aside for the "High School" on the third floor of the Franklin School building, located at Broadway and Tenth Streets in downtown Saint Paul. Some people thought that the school was a waste of space. Eugene Foster (known as the "Father of the High School") was the principal, and Mrs. H.M. Haynes was the lone teacher. The first graduating class of the Saint Paul High School was in 1870, and consisted of two students: Fannie Haynes (the daughter of the teacher), and A. P. Warren. The first 2 diplomas were hand printed on sheepskin. Gradually, the classes enrolled in the Franklin Building became too large for the two little rooms to accommodate them.

=== 1872 (Lindeke Building, 7th and Jackson, second floor) ===
In 1872, the Saint Paul High School moved to the Lindeke Building at 7th and Jackson streets where it occupied the second floor. That year, graduation exercises were held in the Saint Paul Civic Opera House where they were held until it was destroyed by a fire in 1899. Then the commencement exercises were held in the People's Church until the completion of the Saint Paul Auditorium. In 1872, the graduating class consisted of 12 students: five boys and seven girls.

In 1873, the graduating class of 12 students originated the custom of presenting each senior with a souvenir appropriate to his/her character. For several years, a prize was offered for the best essay: a Webster's Unabridged Dictionary and a holder for it. The President of the Board of Education also presented a prize to the one having the highest standing in the class, usually a fine set of Shakespeare's works.

=== 1883/1888 (10th and Minnesota) ===
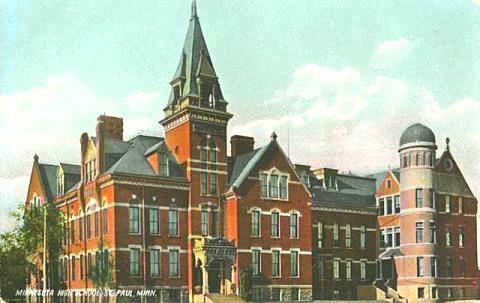
Saint Paul Central High School, 10th and Minnesota, with Annex, in use from 1883 to 1912. 1888 version shown.

A new building opened in 1883 at 10th and Minnesota streets. The building was the first high school built in Saint Paul. In 1888, a 14-room annex was added for laboratories, but there was no money for an astronomical observatory. The Debate society decided to put on plays to make up the money to pay for it. Soon, Central was known as the only high school in the United States to have a fixed telescope with a lens ground and polished by the great telescope maker Alvan Clark (1804–1887), whose company built some of the largest and best telescopes in the world, including the telescope for the Lowell Observatory in Flagstaff, Arizona. Mechanic Arts High School, then known as Manual Training High School, was first housed in the basement of Central. The school was renamed Central High School in 1888.

Soon the building on 10th and Minnesota Street became too small, and the corner of Marshall and Lexington Avenues was chosen as the new site.

=== 1912 (Marshall and Lexington) ===
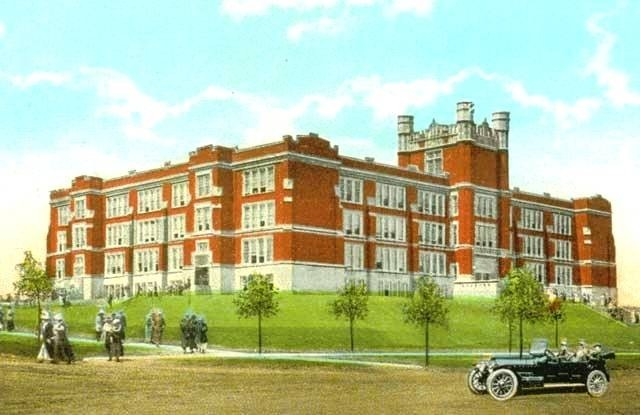
Saint Paul Central High School, Marshall Ave and Lexington Parkway, 1912–1980

A new school, designed by Clarence H. Johnston Sr., was built in 1912 on the corner of Marshall Avenue and Lexington Parkway, and was attempted to be renamed Lexington High School; alumni, however, wanted to keep the moniker Central High School. A compromise was reached when the Minuteman was adopted as a logo and mascot. In other words, the name of the school was retained, but for those who wanted the school to be named "Lexington," its logo and mascot were named after the colonial militia men of 1775 at Lexington, Massachusetts, who fought against the British in the first skirmishes of the War of Independence, and were required to be ready at a minute's notice. The adjacent stadium was built in the early 1940s by the WPA (Works Progress Administration), as denoted by a plaque on the brick facade of the stands. It was renamed James Griffin Stadium in 1998.

1912 Marshall/Lexington building construction:

Working name – West End High School
Proposed name – Lexington High School
Final name – Central High School

Architect - Clarence H. Johnston Sr. - prominent Saint Paul architect, studied architecture in Saint Paul as well as MIT, and the École des Beaux-Arts in Paris, travelled Europe and Asia. Also designed houses for Summit Ave, buildings for the University of Minn, many others.

Architectural Artist – JC Trott (employed by the architect)
Style – Collegiate Gothic
Land purchased – 1909
Designed – 1909–1910
Building Permit Issued – May 31, 1910
Builder – C. Ash Company
Construction started – 1910
Ready for occupancy – 1911 (old school dropped from City Directory)
Cornerstone laid – April, 1912 (building completed)
Flagpole installed – 1914

New gymnasium – 1924 (added to the west side of the school, replacing the old one in the top floor of the middle section; see 1925 yearbook, history of Johnston's career, and spps history document)

Stadium – 1940/1943 depending on the source (building permits or spps).
Cost for 1909–1943 – $650,000 (not counting maintenance, heating, etc.)

=== 1970s and 80s (Marshall and Lexington) ===
Rebuilding and modernization took place in the 1970s and 80s. Led by Ellerbe Architects in 1979, the "castle" exterior was removed or overlaid with cement, a pool and other athletic facilities were added, and the interior was gutted and rebuilt. The building now uses only the structural frame of the previous building. This resulted in a joke amongst students that it was designed by a prison architect because of the school's rather utilitarian exterior, metal gates, and few windows on ground level. Larry Millett, a local architecture critic described the building as, "The nadir of modern school architecture in Saint Paul, a building so resolutely grim and uninviting that it suggests that education can only be viewed as a form of incarceration." Until 2006 a barbed wire fence extended around Griffin Stadium and portions of the school facing Interstate 94 and Lexington contributing to the joke. In August 2013 the fence was replaced with new black vinyl fencing funded by the Lexington-Hamline Community Council, the St Paul School District ISD 625 and a Saint Paul Neighborhood Star grant. A parent-led effort to improve the appearance, function, and sustainability of the building, "Transforming Central," was initiated in 2011.

== Academics ==
Central offers many higher-level classes. It has offered the International Baccalaureate program since 1988. Central has the second largest IB program in the state of Minnesota. Students may also take Advanced Placement classes and their subsequent tests. Central was the only high school in Minnesota to be honored by the Siemens Foundation in their 2007-08 Siemens Awards for Advanced Placement. Central received the award for "its commitment to students and leadership in AP participation and performance". In 1970 Central began to offer the Quest program, the first gifted and talented program approved by Saint Paul Public Schools. This humanities based program was started in order to offer in-depth topics in the humanities that were not available in normal classes. The program continues to challenge students to think independently and to learn from each other and from the teacher in a discussion-based approach towards learning. Over 15 Quest classes are currently offered including classes on world culture, film documentary, ancient civilizations, the Harlem Renaissance and Shakespeare literature. Central has participated in the University of Minnesota‘s College in the Schools program since 1994. As of 2018, Central High School was the only public high school in Minnesota to offer Russian as a foreign language. It also offers the only French and German High School Immersion programs in the Saint Paul Public School District. In addition to Russian, Central has the only Latin language program in the Saint Paul Public Schools District as well.

=== Arts ===
Central offers music classes including Concert Band, Varsity Band, Orchestra, Central Chamber Singers, Mixed Choir, Tenor Bass Choir, and Soprano Alto Choir. Co-Curricular opportunities include Orchestra, Chamber Orchestra, Jazz Band, student led choirs such Minnesingers, Meistersingers, and North Star Singers, as well as the Music Listening Contest. Central performing ensembles have traveled in recent years to Washington, DC, San Diego, New Orleans, New York City, San Francisco, Chicago, and Nashville. The Central Concert Band and Orchestra were selected to perform at the 2007 MMEA Mid Winter Clinic. The Central IB Music program offers instruction in music theory, history, composition, and solo-performance.

Central was also known for its BlackBox Theater Program with the advance acting troupe known as Central Touring Theatre (CTT). Theater company members came from a variety of racial, ethnic and socioeconomic backgrounds. St. Paul Central High School's Central Touring Theater (CTT) has created original social justice theater and the juniors and seniors became the teachers to the audience as they used theater to present important issues that resonate in their lives, including racism, sexism, depression, abuse and more.

== Athletics ==
Central has produced a long line of talented athletes, the most notable being Major League Baseball Hall of Fame inductee Dave Winfield. More recently, Central's athletics programs displayed their dominance when they won the 2008 St. Paul City Conference in every fall athletics category. Other sports includes volleyball, tennis, badminton, etc.

=== Girls basketball ===
The 2006–07 girls basketball team hoists their class AAAA trophy after defeating Minneapolis South, 81–63.

In the 2006–2007 season, the Central high school girls basketball team set a state record for most victories in a single season, going 32–0 en route to the class AAAA state championship. During their perfect season, Central was considered by some to be the best team in the history of Minnesota High School girls basketball. Central beat their opponents by an average of 44 points per game, averaged 86 PPG and had all five starters average more than 10 PPG. In addition, the 2006–2007 girls basketball team served as grand marshals for the 2007 Rondo Days parade.

The 2007–08 girls basketball team storms the court in celebration of their class AAAA state championship.

Overall, Central has won four state titles in girls basketball: 1976, 1979, 2007, and 2008.

=== Boys baseball ===
In the 2022 baseball season, the Central high school varsity boys baseball team ended their season in First within the Saint Paul conference. Not only did they place first, the team completely swept the competition, being the first to do so in at least 15 years.

=== Girls Volleyball ===
Central high school has also produced many D1 athletes.

== Extracurricular activities ==
Central High School has a plethora of extracurricular activities including National Honors Society, math team, Debate, Ski club and more.

Central's math team has also been highly successful. In 2007, the math team was undefeated and won the state championship, scoring a state record number of points at the tournament.

Central High School is home to a policy debate program. The team qualified to the quarterfinals of the Minnesota State High School League Policy Debate Quarterfinals as the fourth seeded team before they were eliminated by Edina High School. In 2008, the team faced Highland Park High School at the final round of the Minnesota state debate tournament. In 2010, the team reached the quarter-finals of the Tournament of Champions and one student was the 9th place speaker. In 2012, the team reached the semi-finals of the National Urban Debate League tournament. In 2013, Ayaan Natala became the first African-American to reach the final round of the Minnesota State High School League tournament. The school has trophies from debate tournaments going back to the early 20th Century.

== Notable alumni ==
- Neal R. Amundson, head of the University of Minnesota's chemical engineering department, 1949-1974; known as the "father of modern chemical engineering"
- Martin Apple (1956), molecular biologist and president of the Council of Scientific Society Presidents
- Dave Arneson, co-creator of Dungeons & Dragons.
- Jeanne Arth, former U.S Open Doubles champion and Wimbledon Doubles champion
- Rita Bell, singer and actress
- Andy Bischoff, NFL assistant coach
- Micah Boyd, 2008 Summer Olympics crew rower
- Melvin Carter, former mayor of Saint Paul
- Joshua Cain, co-founder and lead guitarist of American pop punk band Motion City Soundtrack
- Elijah Campbell, American football player
- Corbin (musician), R&B artist and composer
- Midge Decter, editor and author
- Thomas M. Disch, science fiction writer and poet
- John Drew, Minnesota state legislator and businessman
- Colton Dunn, actor and comedian
- Amelia Earhart, aviation pioneer and women's rights advocate, attended briefly before moving to Chicago
- Dave Frishberg, jazz musician and author of "I'm Just a Bill"
- Michael J. George, Minnesota state legislator
- Heiruspecs, live hop-hop band
- Leigh Kamman, jazz musician and radio host
- Jawed Karim, co-founder of YouTube
- Allan Kingdom, rapper, record producer, and member of Thestand4rd
- Jeff Loots, gridiron football player
- Harvey Mackay, chairman of MackayMitchell Envelope, author of Swim With The Sharks
- Joe Mande, actor and comedian
- E.D.I. Mean, born Malcolm Greenidge, member of rap group Outlawz
- Frederick Joseph Miller, Minnesota state senator and lawyer
- Mint Condition, R&B band
- Psymun, record producer and member of Thestand4rd
- Gordon Parks, photographer, filmmaker, and writer
- Bobby Raps, musician and member of Thestand4rd
- Stacy Robinson, NFL wide receiver with the New York Giants, two Super Bowl championships
- John Roethlisberger, three time Olympic gymnast
- Dua Saleh, poet and rapper
- Charlie Sanders, actor and comedian
- T. Denny Sanford (grad. 1954), banker
- Susie Scanlan, bronze-medal winning fencer at the 2012 Olympics
- Charles M. Schulz, author of the Peanuts comic strip
- Richard M. Schulze, founder of Best Buy
- Max Shulman, a 20th-century American writer and humorist best known for his television and short story character Dobie Gillis
- Don Simensen, American football player
- DJ Skee, DJ, radio personality, producer, and television host
- Danez Smith, poet
- Nick Swardson, actor and stand-up comedian
- Jon Wiener, historian and political commentator
- Stokley Williams, American singer, record producer, and percussionist
- Dave Winfield, Baseball Hall of Fame left fielder

== Records ==
Records of Central High School are available for research use. They consist of historical data, programs, invitations, and handbooks, pupil lists, subject files, scrapbooks and photographs, documenting a wide variety of school activities and events, and correspondence and newspaper clippings about former pupil Amelia Earhart.
