= Murtough O'Brien =

Murtough O'Brien can refer to:

- Muircheartach Ua Briain, (d. 1119), High King of Ireland, 1101-1119
- Muircheartach Ó Briain, King of Thomond, King of Thomond, victor in the Battle of Dysert O'Dea
