= James Griffin Stadium =

Football stadium in Saint Paul, Minnesota

Coordinates: 44°57′1.90″N 93°8′53.43″W

Griffin Stadium
- "The Jimmy," "The Griff"
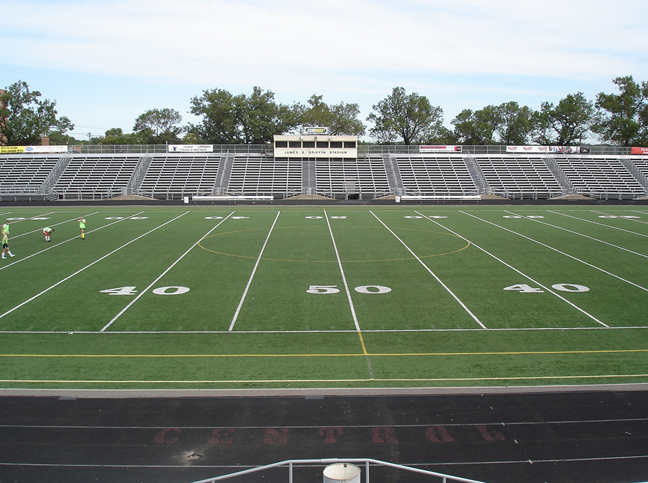
- An overhead view of James Griffin Stadium, with an exterior shot of the press box.
- Interactive map of Griffin Stadium
- Full name: James S. Griffin Stadium
- Location: Saint Paul, Minnesota
- Owner: Saint Paul Public Schools
- Capacity: 4,367

Construction
- Opened: 1930

Tenants
- Central High School (football, soccer, track and field, lacrosse) (1940–present); Concordia Golden Bears (football and soccer) (1999–2008); Minnesota Thunder (USL-1) (2004–2008); Minnesota Wind Chill (AUDL) (2013–2014); Viejos Son Los Trapos FC (NPSL) (2017–2018)

James Griffin Stadium is a 4,367-capacity stadium in Saint Paul, Minnesota, USA.

== History ==
Although it is located on the grounds of Saint Paul Central High School, It was previously a venue for two high schools in the Saint Paul public school district who did not have a football stadium of their own; Como Park and Johnson. It was also home the Concordia University football and women's soccer teams until 2008 as well as the Hamline University football team for one season while their stadium was rebuilt.

The stadium was home to the Minnesota Thunder from 2004 through May 12, 2008.

The stadium, colloquially referred to as "The Jimmy" by Thunder supporters and "The Griff" by Concordia fans, was originally named Central Stadium. It was renamed in 1988 for James S. Griffin, the first black police captain in Saint Paul, as well as an athlete and athletic official.

After 14 years at the National Sports Center in Blaine the Minnesota Thunder moved to James Griffin Stadium. The Thunder cited the increased accessibility, compared to a suburb 20 miles (32 km) away, and the want to expand its fan base. In May 2008 the Thunder moved back to the National Sports Center.

== Evolution ==
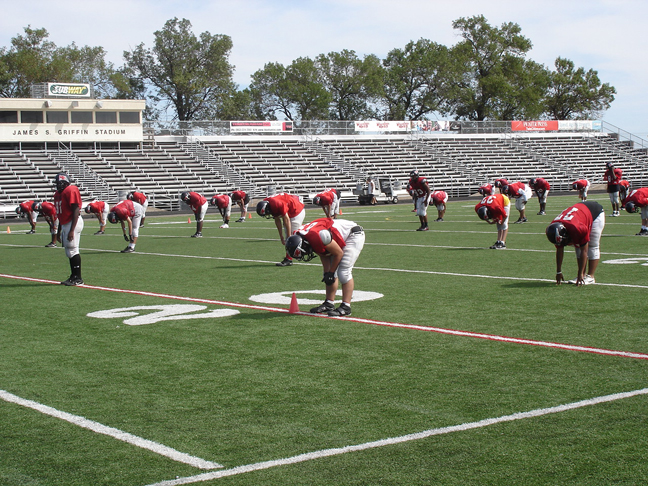
Players of Central's high school football team, the Minutemen, exercising during a summer practice session.

James Griffin Stadium has seen a significant number of changes in the early 2000s. The first of these changes were the installation of powerful halogen lights in place of old light poles that were placed in front of the bleachers. The old lights were known to block some viewing angles from fans as well as television crews.

In 2003, the grass surface was removed from the field and replaced by artificial turf, manufactured and installed by Sprinturf. This was a welcome move by many Central and Concordia athletes, as the grass surface was torn up by the high amount of football and soccer games in the fall. Funding was made possible through donations from Concordia University, the Minnesota Vikings, and the NFL Youth Football Fund.

During the winter of 2006-2007, the track was replaced and expanded. The track had been previously damaged when the artificial turf was installed in 2003. The track expanded from 6 lanes to 8 lanes and now can accommodate Minnesota State High School League sanctioned events in track and field. The renovations moved the handicap accessible ramps from ground level into the stands themselves.

During this time, the Minnesota Thunder team again relocated back to their original headquarters in Blaine. Concordia University also began construction on a brand new stadium of their own on the other side of their campus. With the departure of both Concordia and the Minnesota Thunder, Griffin Stadium was again officially designated as Central High School's home field by the St. Paul School District. However, other high schools within the district (including Como Park and Johnson) continue to use it for varsity athletics in lieu of their own fields which have not yet been evaluated by the Minnesota State High School League (MSHSL).

The scoreboard was the last element to receive an upgrade in the stadium. Before the start of fall sports in 2009, the eggcrate-style scoreboard was replaced with an LED version to enhance visibility during daytime games.

In addition to sporting events, James Griffin Stadium has been the host site for the Rondo Days drill team competition numerous times.
