= Don Simensen =

American football player (1926–1994)

No. 76
- Position: Offensive tackle

Personal information
- Born: September 11, 1926; Minot, North Dakota, U.S.
- Died: April 22, 1994 (aged 67); Fridley, Minnesota, U.S.
- Listed height: 6 ft 2 in (1.88 m)
- Listed weight: 220 lb (100 kg)

Career information
- High school: Central (Saint Paul, Minnesota)
- College: St. Thomas (1947–1950)

Career history
- Los Angeles Rams (1951–1952)

Awards and highlights
- NFL champion (1951)
- Stats at Pro Football Reference

Donald Roy Simensen (September 11, 1926 – April 22, 1994) was an American professional football offensive tackle who played two seasons with the Los Angeles Rams of the National Football League (NFL). He played college football at the University of St. Thomas.

== Early life ==
Donald Roy Simensen was born on September 11, 1926, in Minot, North Dakota. He attended Central High School in Saint Paul, Minnesota.

== College career ==
Simensen was a member of the St. Thomas Tommies of the University of St. Thomas from 1947 to 1950. He helped the Tommies win the Minnesota Intercollegiate Athletic Conference championship each year from 1947 to 1949. He also played hockey for the Tommies. Simensen graduated from St. Thomas with a Bachelor of Arts in 1951. He was inducted into the school's athletics hall of fame in 1974.

== Professional career ==
Simensen signed with the Los Angeles Rams after going undrafted in the 1951 NFL draft. He played in all 12 games, starting 11 at tackle, for the Rams during his rookie year in 1951. He also started for the Rams in the 1951 NFL Championship Game, a 24–17 victory over the Cleveland Browns. He appeared in 12 games, starting nine, during the 1952 season. He also started one playoff game that year. Simensen became a free agent after the 1952 season.

== Personal life ==
Simensen was a teacher at high schools in St. Paul, Minnesota after his NFL career. He died on April 22, 1994, in Fridley, Minnesota.
