= John Burger =

American politician

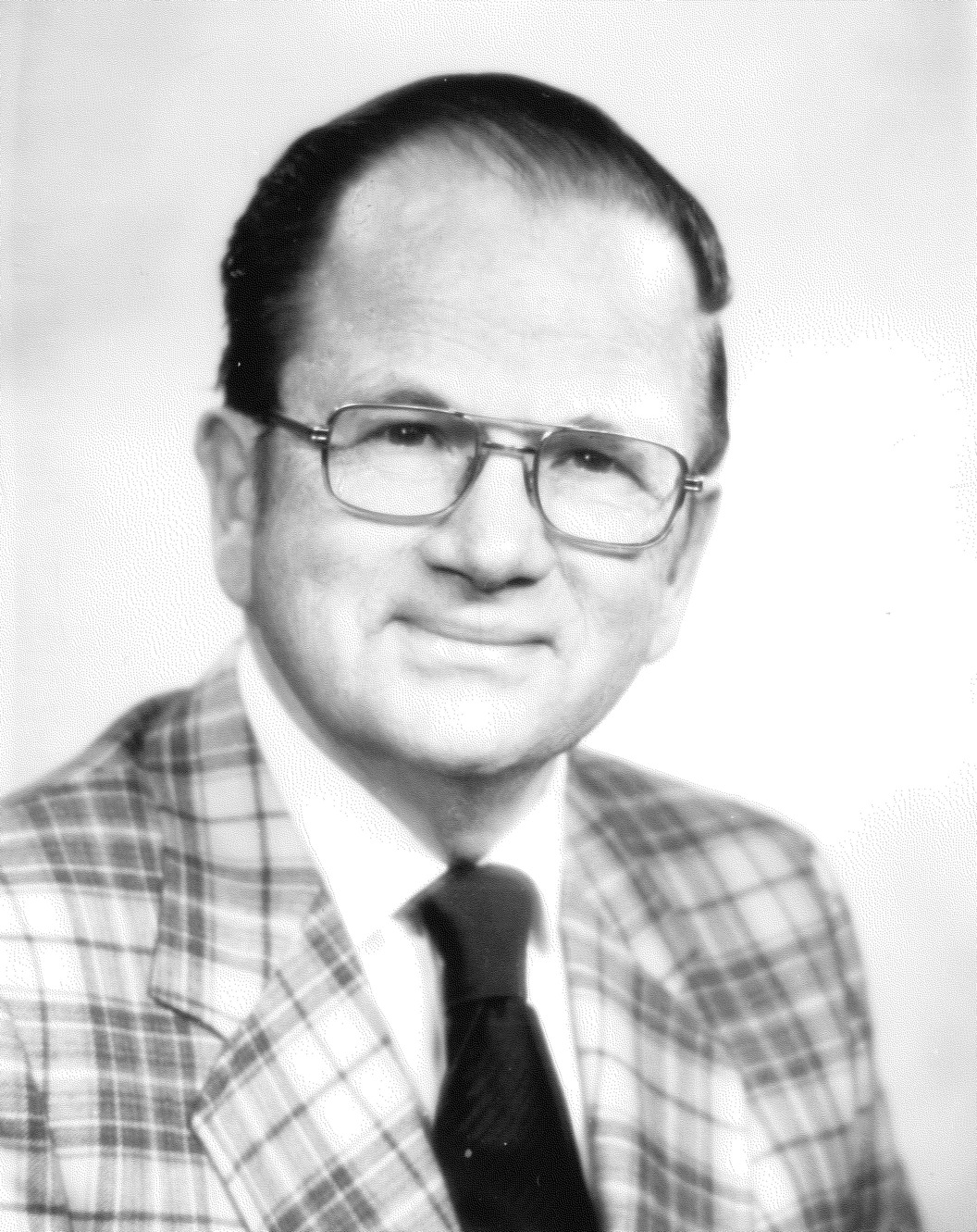
- Burger c. 1983

Member of the Minnesota House of Representatives from the 43A District
- In office January 3, 1983 – January 2, 1991
- Governor: Rudy Perpich

Personal details
- Born: April 10, 1916 Lafayette, Indiana, U.S.
- Died: January 11, 2005 (aged 88) Beaumont, California, U.S.
- Resting place: Fort Snelling National Cemetery, St. Paul, Minnesota, U.S.
- Other political affiliations: Independent Republican

Military service
- Allegiance: United States
- Branch/service: United States Air Force
- Rank: Lieutenant Colonel
- Battles/wars: World War II

John Burger (April 10, 1916 – January 11, 2005) was an American politician, businessman, and lawyer.

== Biography ==
Born in Lafayette, Indiana, Burger served in the United States Army Air Forces during World War II and became a lieutenant colonel. He graduated from Goodland High School.

Burger received his bachelor's degree from Indiana University Bloomington in 1935 and his law degree from University of Minnesota Law School in 1938.

He was an educator and management consultant for the Dale Carnegie Institute and worked at General Mills. Burger lived in Long Lake, Minnesota.

Burger was a lawyer and accountant. He served in the Minnesota House of Representatives as a Republican from 1983 until 1990.

Burger died in California of pneumonia.

== Notes ==
Party political offices
Preceded by John Drew	Republican nominee for Minnesota State Treasurer; 1990	Succeeded by James C. Olson
