= Silicon Republic =

Irish technology website

Silicon Republic is an Irish technology news website, founded by Ann O'Dea and Darren McAuliffe in 2001. It has been honoured at the Irish Web Awards.

== InspireFest ==
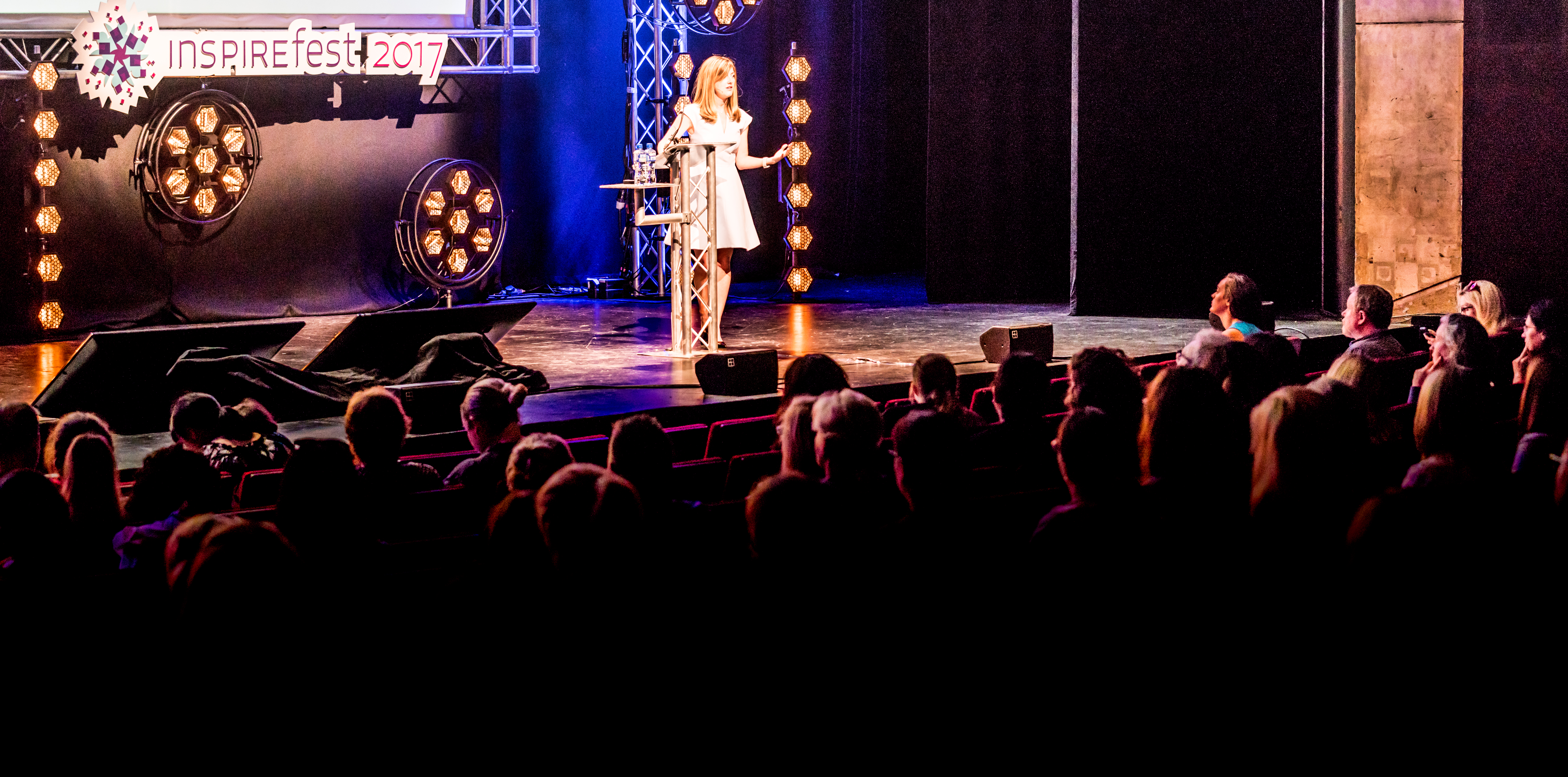
InspireFest 2017

Silicon Republic ran InspireFest, an annual convention on the topics of science, technology and creativity, from 2014 to 2019. After five years, it was replaced by Future Human in 2020, taking place at the Trinity Business School building.
