= Dysert O'Dea Monastery =

12th-century Irish church

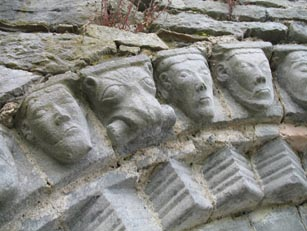
- The faces on the outer arch of the doorway

- Location within Ireland
- Interactive map of Dysert O'Dea Monastery

People
- Founder: Tola of Clonard

Site
- Location: near Corofin, County Clare, Ireland
- Coordinates: 52°54′33″N 9°04′06″W
- Public access: yes

Dysert O'Dea Church (Irish: Díseart Uí Dheá - "the hermitage of Deá") near Corofin in County Clare, Ireland stands on the site of an early Christian monastery which is thought to have been founded by St. Tola in the 8th century. Most of the present structures are from the 12th century.

The site has been designated a National Monument of Ireland.

== Architecture ==
The remains of the monastic site include "St. Tola's Church", a round tower, "St. Tola's Well" and "St. Tola's Cross".

=== Church ===
The church stands on the site of the original monastery, reportedly founded by St. Tola in the 8th century. The ruined Romanesque structure visible today mainly dates to the 12th century and is over 30 metres long. The lancet windows in the east gable were additions from the early 13th century. The stone arch, showing twelve human and seven animal heads, also dates to the 13th century. Inside the church is the grave of Joan O'Dea, wife of the last clan chieftain, Michael O'Dea (dating to 1684).

=== Round tower ===
The late 11th-century round tower was converted into a fortification in the 16th century. It was severely damaged by artillery fire by Cromwellian troops in 1651. Of an estimated original height of around 30 metres, only about a third still remains. An old bronze bell discovered in 1790 was taken to Corofin and sold to pay for the current church bell. In the 1850s, Edward Synge, the local landlord, made repairs to the tower.

St. Tola's Well is a pre-Christian well that was the site of an annual pilgrimage on 30 March. In the 1860s the landlord had the well paved over but it was reopened in 1986.

=== High Cross ===
A high cross, the so-called "St. Tola's Cross", is located in a field to the east of the church. It dates to the 12th century. The upper part shows the crucifixion, while on the shaft is the figure of a bishop, with the back and sides showing Irish interlacing work. The cross was knocked over by the Cromwellian soldiers but repaired by Michael O'Dea in 1683. Since he used stones from the church to set up the pedestal, the church building must have fallen into disuse by then. The Synge family again restored the cross in 1871. In 1960, the cross was temporarily dismantled and shipped to Barcelona for an exhibition on Irish art.

== Nearby ==
This monastic site is part of the Dysert O'Dea Archaeological Trail. There are many more historical sites in the immediate vicinity including O'Dea Castle, two ring forts, the remains of a fulacht fiadh, and the ruins of a stone Victorian house dating from 1861.

Synge's Lodge is a ruined guest house, originally built in the Georgian style not far from the church ruins. The Synge coat of arms with the motto Caelesta canimes remains over the door. The Synge's local agent lived in nearby Mollaneen House, built c. 1780. This had a walled garden and orchard.

The Battle of Dysert O'Dea of 1318 took place near the monastic site.

== Gallery ==
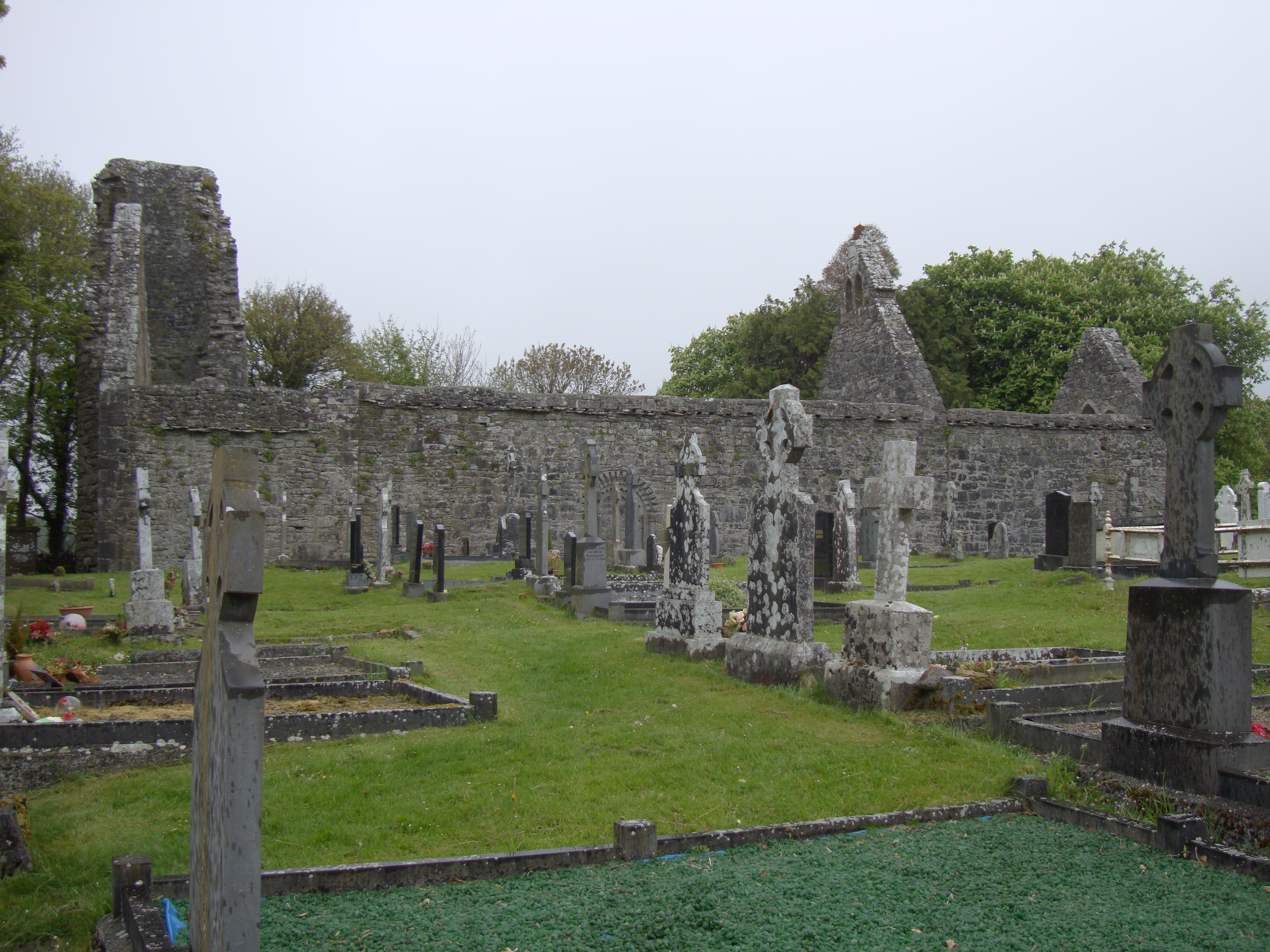
General view of site

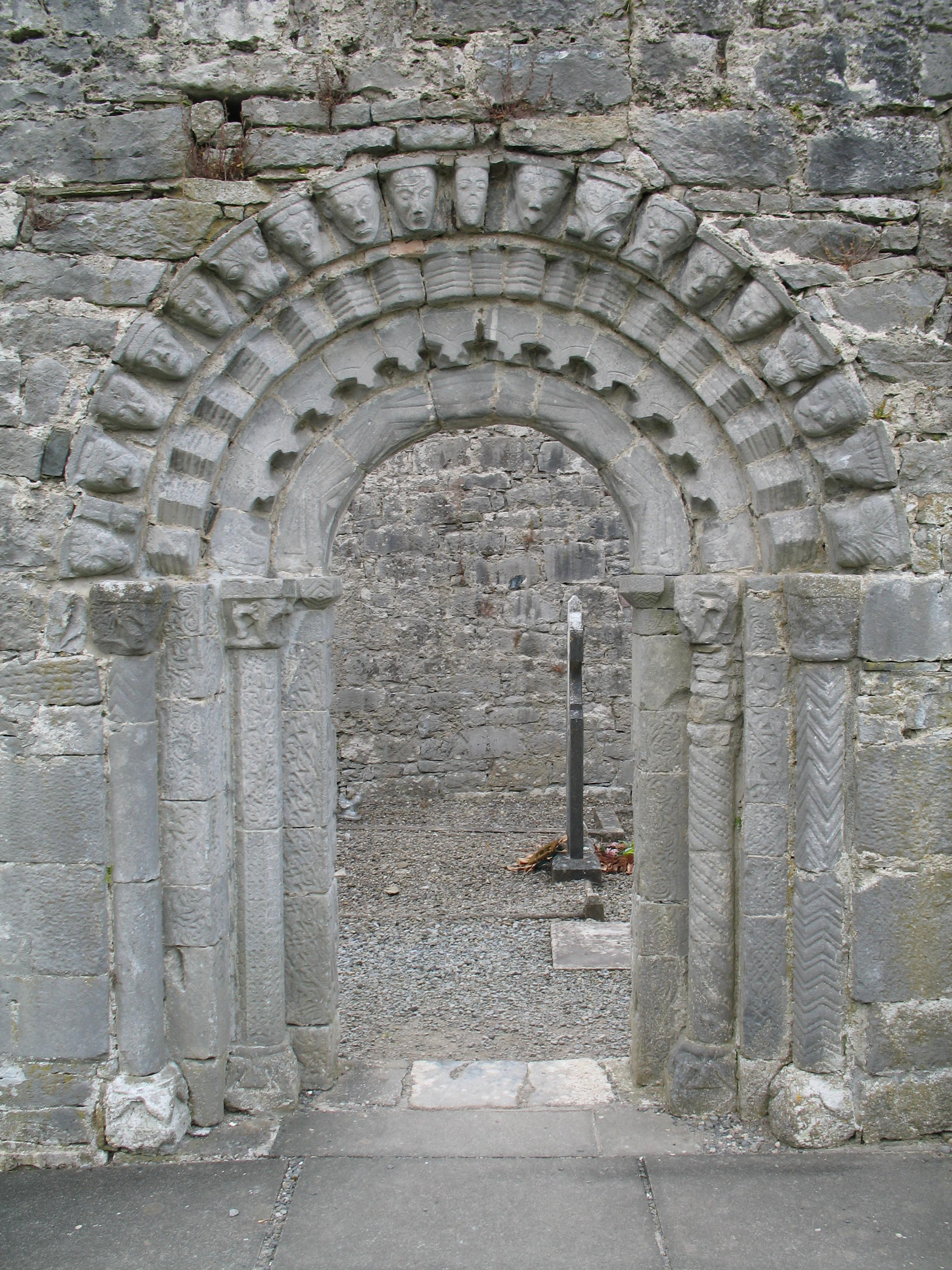
Doorway of St. Tola's Church

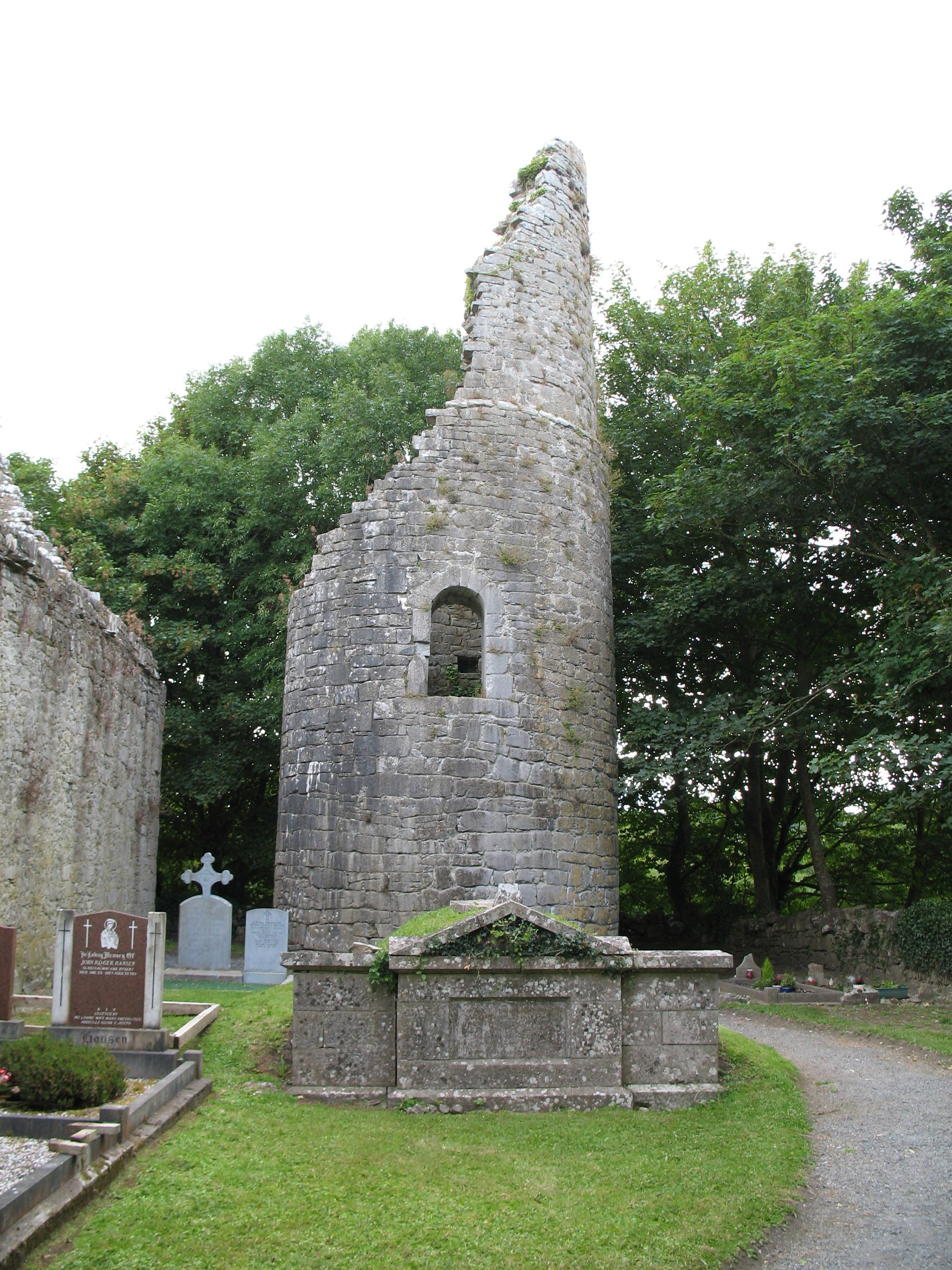
Dysert O'Dea round tower

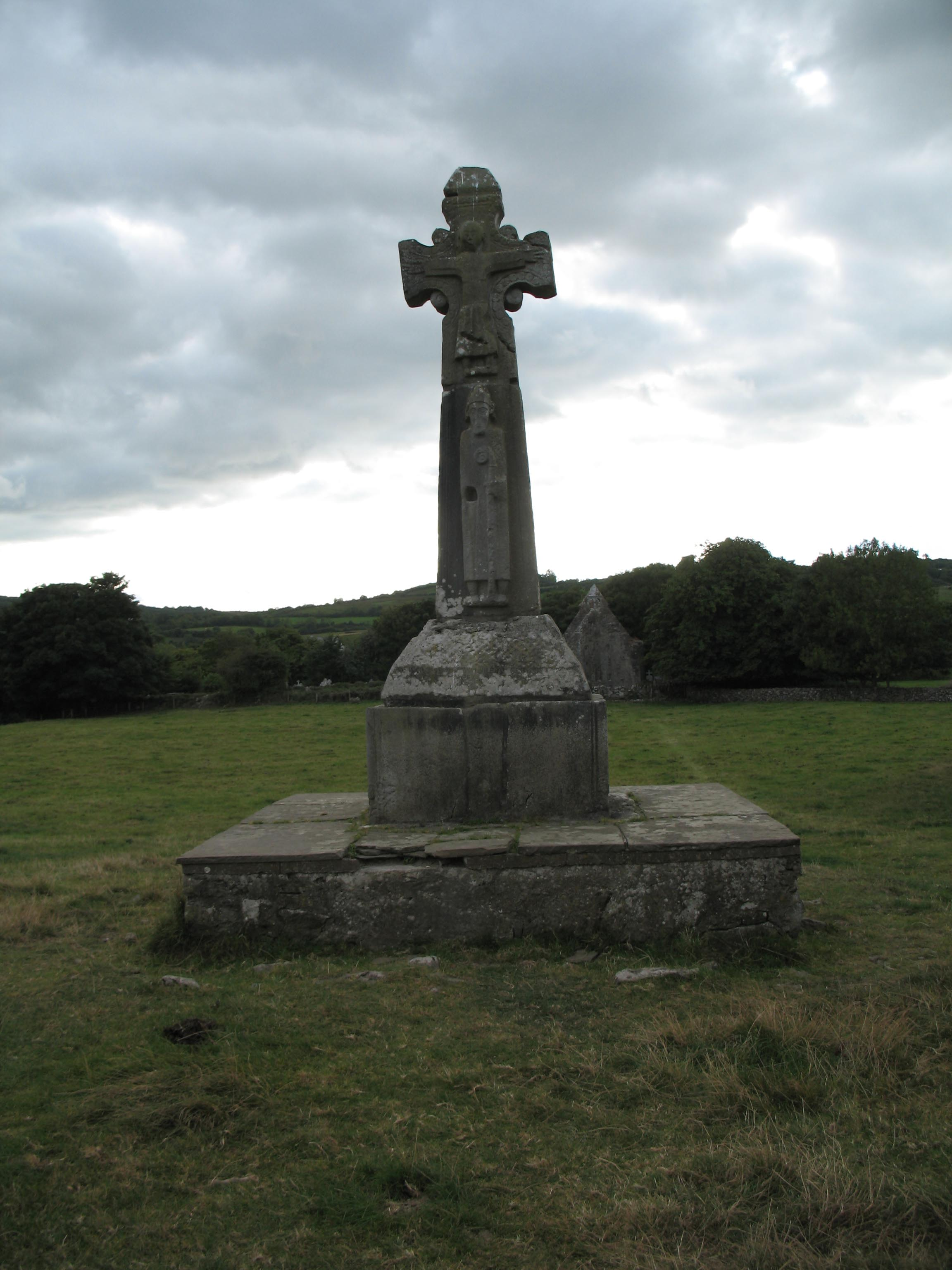
St. Tola's Cross

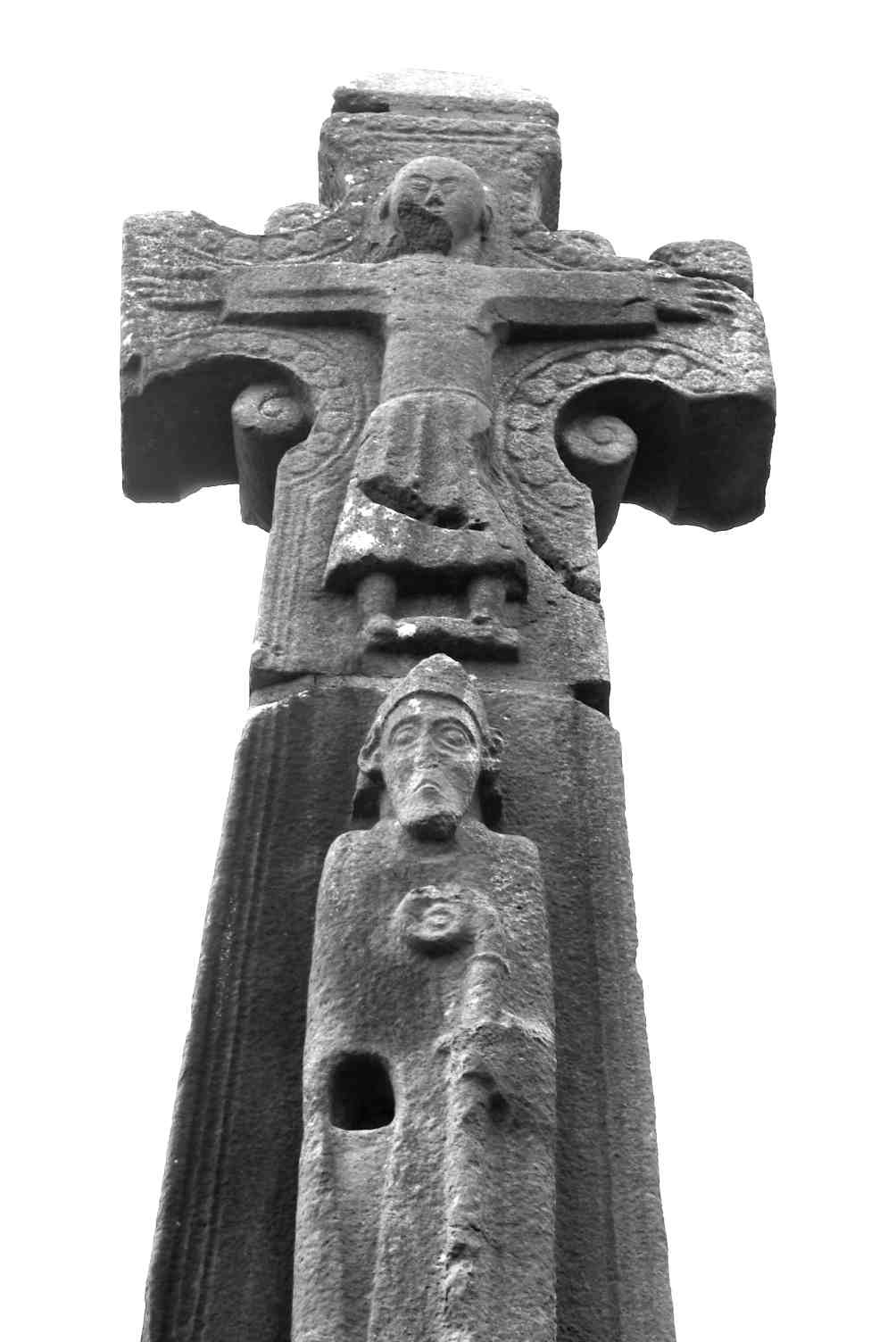
Details of St. Tola's Cross

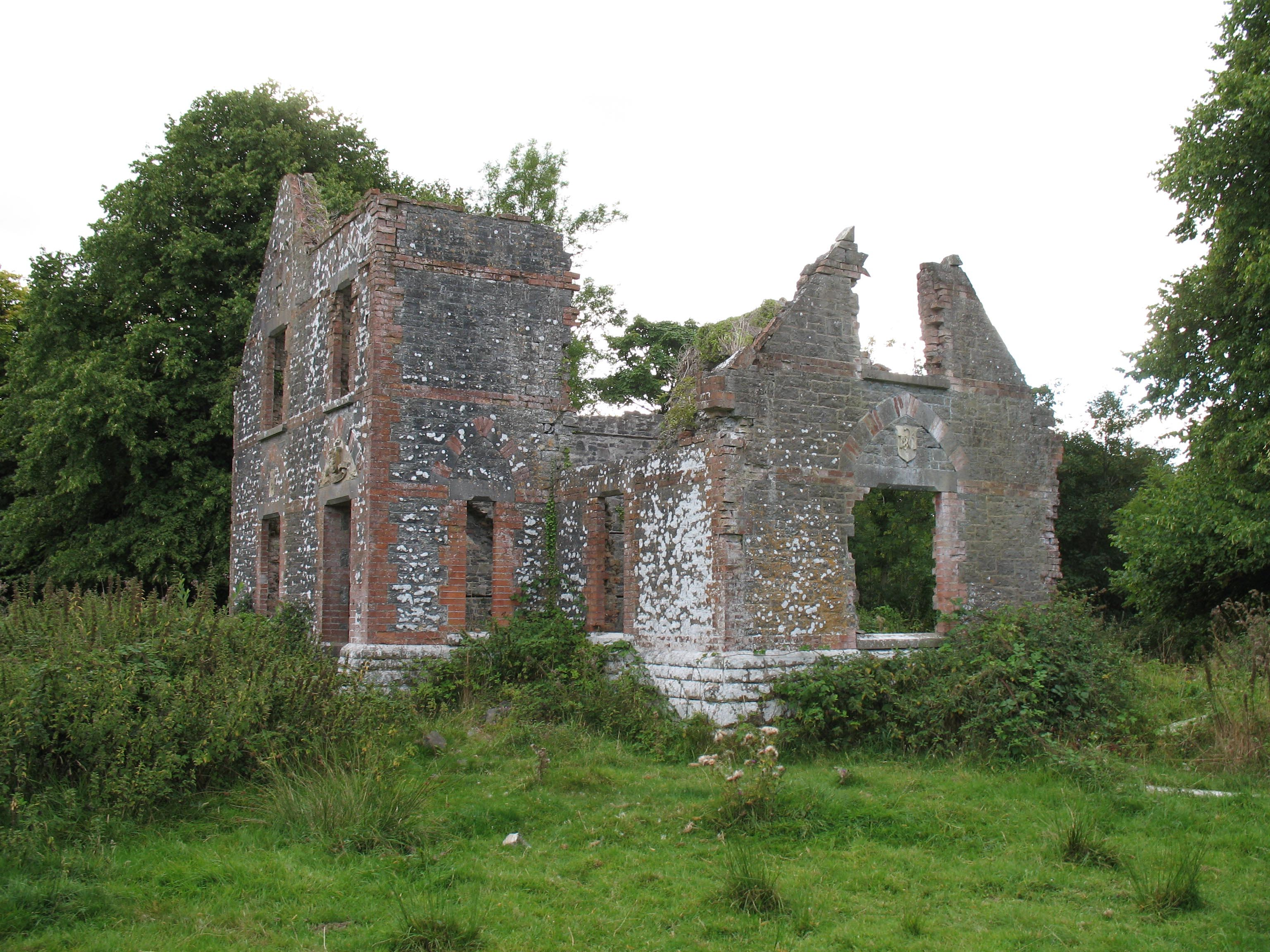
Victorian ruins of Synge's Lodge

== Sources ==
- Ua Cróinín, Risteárd (Richard Cronin_. O'Dea: Ua Deághaidh: The Story of a Rebel Clan. Ballinakella Press, Whitegate, Co. Clare, Ireland, 1992. ISBN 0-946538-07-7.
- O'Farrell, Fergus. "Dysert O'Dea: The Monks of Dysert O'Dea". Archaeology Ireland, volume 18, nr. 3, Autumn, 2004. pp. 26-27.
- Westropp, T.J.. "The Cross of Dysert O'Dea". The Journal of the Royal Society of Antiquaries of Ireland, volume 10, nr. 4, 1900. pp. 375-377. JSTOR 25507102
