= Tola of Clonard =

Irish saint (7th century)

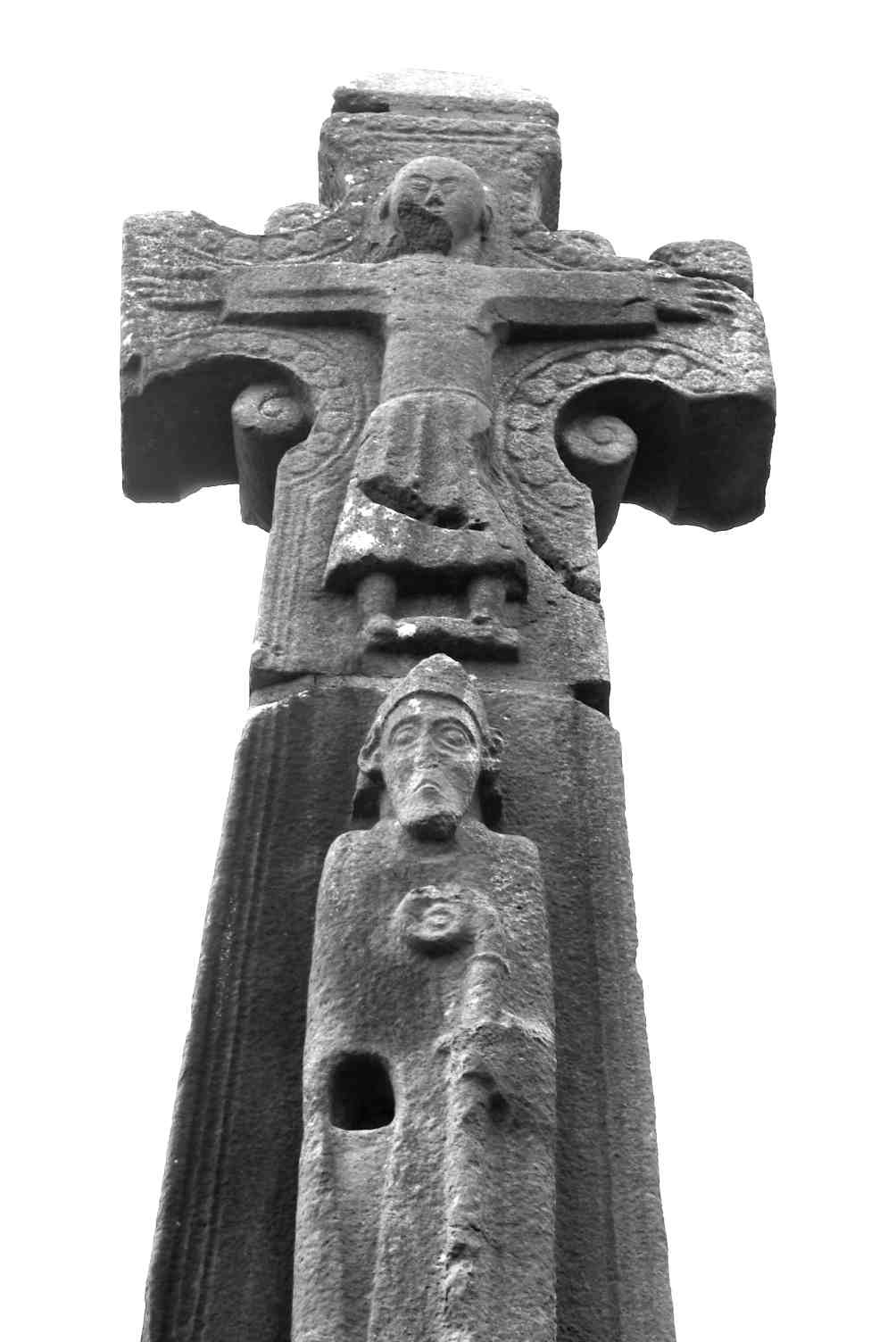
St. Tola's Cross at Dysert O'Dea

Saint Tola is the name of a seventh-century Irish Roman Catholic and Orthodox Christian saint, also referred to as "a good soldier of Christ".

== Life ==
Tola, the reputed son of Donchad, is also referred to as Thola or Tolanus. He was born after the middle of the seventh century.

He lived for many years the life of a hermit at Disert Tola, and founded a monastery there in the latter 7th or early 8th century.

He was the bishop of Clonard in Meath, Ireland and a crozier ascribed to him now resides in the National Museum of Ireland, in Dublin. About the year 700, he established a monastic community in northwestern County Clare, between the River Fergus and the Burren. He sent missionaries to Europe and also helped the expansion of various scholarly studies. Later, Bishop Tola was called to preside over Clonard, County Meath until his death sometime between 734 and 737.

Portions of his original church, a very early church, or at least portions of its foundations, were incorporated into the 11th-century Romanesque Church that lies in ruins near Corofin. The high cross at Dysert O'Dea Monastery is referred to as Tola's Cross, Crusha Baunala or "the cross of blessing". It is from the 11th or 12th century, however, and there is no direct connection between the saint and this particular, late, high cross although one of the figures on the cross appears to be that of a bishop, perhaps St. Tola.

== Veneration ==
His feast day is celebrated on 30 March.

St. Tola is the patron saint of County Clare, and is invoked against "toothaches", The cross had a portion that could be taken out and was placed near the tooth in order to assist in healing.

In the year 1034, Coirten Ua Maebuain, Lord of Dealbhna, was killed by some of his clansmen, on the threshold of Disert Tola church. In punishment for this sacrilegious and unnatural murder, the perpetrator of the crime was killed the very same hour he perpetrated the treacherous act.
