= Mahtomedi, Minnesota =

City in Minnesota

Mahtomedi
- City
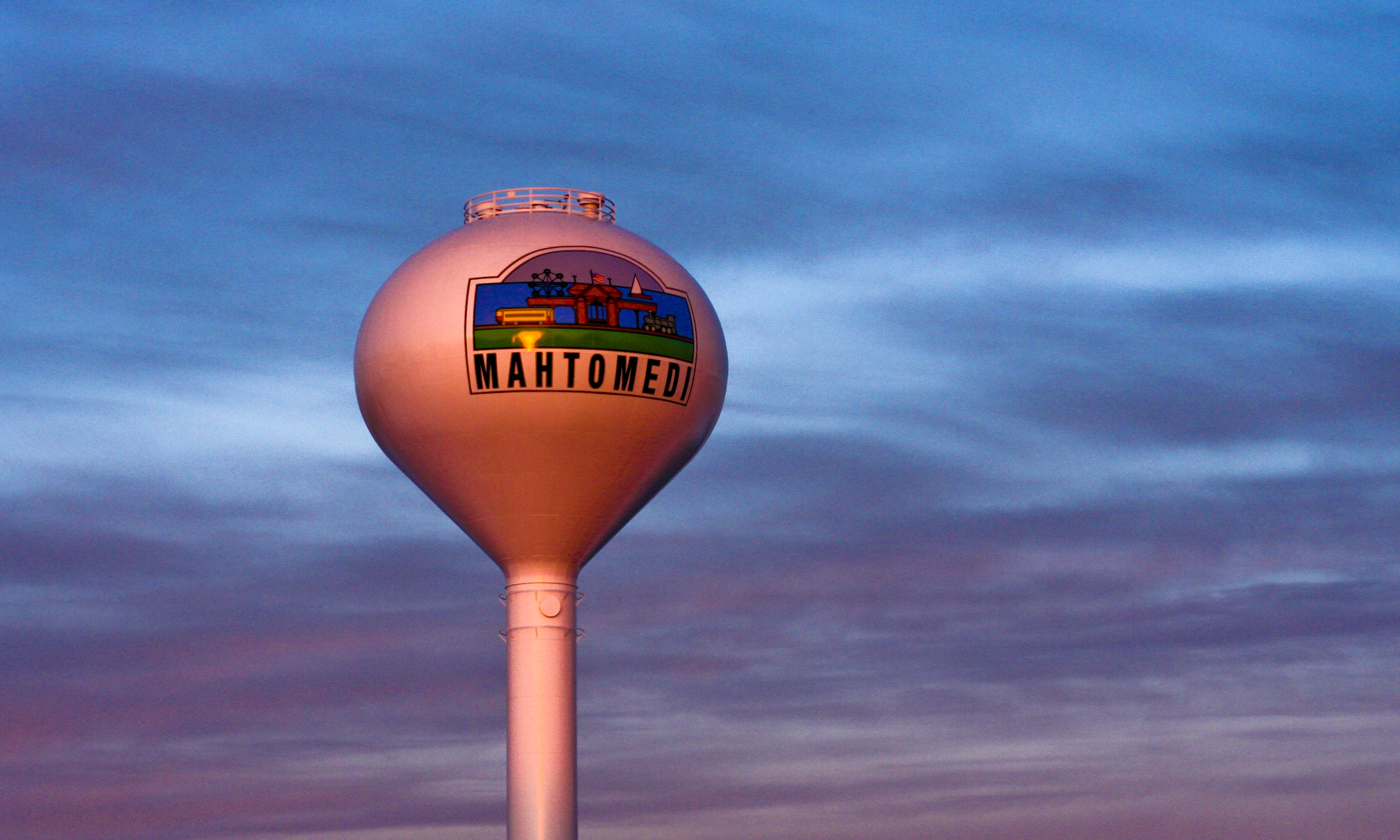
- The City of Mahtomedi water tower at sunset

- Location of the city of Mahtomedi within Washington County, Minnesota
- Coordinates: 45°3′39″N 92°57′32″W
- Country: United States
- State: Minnesota
- County: Washington

Area
  - Total: 5.71 sq mi (14.79 km^{2})
  - Land: 3.47 sq mi (8.98 km^{2})
  - Water: 2.24 sq mi (5.81 km^{2})
- Elevation: 919 ft (280 m)

Population (2020)
  - Total: 8,138
  - Density: 2,346.6/sq mi (906.02/km^{2})
- Time zone: UTC-6 (Central (CST))
  - Summer (DST): UTC-5 (CDT)
- ZIP code: 55115
- Area code: 651
- FIPS code: 27-39428
- GNIS feature ID: 2395818
- Website: https://www.mahtomedimn.gov/

Mahtomedi (/ˌmɑːtoʊˈmiːdaɪ/ MAH-toh-MEE-dy) is a city in Washington County, Minnesota, United States. The population was 8,138 at the 2020 census. Mahtomedi is a suburb of St. Paul and is located between St. Paul and Stillwater along the shores of White Bear Lake. Cities that border Mahtomedi include Pine Springs, Willernie, White Bear Lake, Hugo, Grant, Lake Elmo, and Oakdale.

== Geography ==
Mahtomedi is about 20 minutes northeast of St. Paul, the capital of Minnesota. According to the United States Census Bureau, the city has a total area of 5.75 square miles (14.89 km^{2}), of which 3.49 square miles (9.04 km^{2}) is land and 2.27 square miles (5.88 km^{2}) is water, part of which is White Bear Lake. Interstate 694 and Mahtomedi Avenue are two of the main routes in the community. Mahtomedi is north of State Hwy 36, and east of I-694. Hwy 12 runs (E/W) through Mahtomedi. Hwy 244 runs (n/s) through Mahtomedi and is also called Dellwood Road.

== History ==
Mahtomedi was platted in 1883. The city name is from the Dakota for White Bear Lake - mathó "bear", and mde (bdé) "lake". A post office was established at Mahtomedi in 1884 and remains in operation today on Wildwood Road. Mahtomedi has a strong history of criminal activity during the prohibition years.

== Education ==
Mahtomedi is home to its own school district, which services Dellwood, Grant, Hugo, Mahtomedi, Pine Springs, Willernie, and parts of Lake Elmo, Oakdale, Stillwater, and White Bear Lake:

- Wildwood Elementary (K-2) (commonly referred to as 'Wildwood')
- Oscar Henry Anderson Elementary (3-5) (commonly referred to as 'OHA', 'OH', or 'OH Anderson')
- Mahtomedi Middle School (6-8) (commonly referred to as 'MMS')
- Mahtomedi High School (9-12) (commonly referred to as 'MHS')
  - Mahtomedi High School was ranked the best high school in Minnesota in 2013.

In addition to the Mahtomedi Public School District, Mahtomedi also is home to the St. Jude of the Lake School. St. Jude's is a private catholic school that educates students from preschool to eighth grade.

Half of Century College, a member of the MNSCU system, is located in Mahtomedi. The other half is located in White Bear Lake, which is the mailing address for the college. Century Avenue, which runs north and south, is the dividing line between Washington and Ramsey counties and between White Bear Lake and Mahtomedi. A long footbridge extends between the West Campus and East Campus of Century College.

=== High School Athletics ===
The school colors of Mahtomedi Senior High School are blue and gold and the mascot is the Zephyr. Mahtomedi is well known for its girls' soccer and also for its high school football team. The girls team won the state championship in 2004, 2005, 2006, 2008, 2017, 2018, and 2019. The football team won the state championship in 2005 in an overtime win against the Academy of Holy Angels. On November 5, 2009, Mahtomedi's Boys Varsity soccer team won its first state championship against Hermantown. The Mahtomedi Zephyr gymnastics team has also won state 10 times, winning their first in 1982. The Mahtomedi Girls' tennis team also won their first state title in 2016 against the Edina Hornets who had won the past 19 years prior. Most recently, the Mahtomedi Boys’ Hockey Team won the state championship in 2023 as well as in 2020. The Zephyr mascot originally came from the 1930s car Lincoln Zephyr. However, the Zephyr mascot currently references Zephyrus, the Greek god of the west wind.

== Demographics ==
Historical population
Census	Pop.	Note	%±
1940	876		—
1950	1,375		57.0%
1960	2,127		54.7%
1970	2,640		24.1%
1980	3,851		45.9%
1990	5,569		44.6%
2000	7,563		35.8%
2010	7,676		1.5%
2020	8,138		6.0%
U.S. Decennial Census; 2012 Estimate

=== 2020 census ===
As of the 2020 census, Mahtomedi had a population of 8,138. The median age was 44.5 years. 24.3% of residents were under the age of 18 and 19.7% of residents were 65 years of age or older. For every 100 females there were 92.2 males, and for every 100 females age 18 and over there were 90.2 males age 18 and over.

99.6% of residents lived in urban areas, while 0.4% lived in rural areas.

There were 3,157 households in Mahtomedi, of which 32.4% had children under the age of 18 living in them. Of all households, 58.5% were married-couple households, 11.6% were households with a male householder and no spouse or partner present, and 25.6% were households with a female householder and no spouse or partner present. About 25.5% of all households were made up of individuals and 17.5% had someone living alone who was 65 years of age or older.

There were 3,289 housing units, of which 4.0% were vacant. The homeowner vacancy rate was 1.0% and the rental vacancy rate was 6.1%.

Racial composition as of the 2020 census
Race	Number	Percent
White	7,194	88.4%
Black or African American	246	3.0%
American Indian and Alaska Native	14	0.2%
Asian	176	2.2%
Native Hawaiian and Other Pacific Islander	0	0.0%
Some other race	65	0.8%
Two or more races	443	5.4%
Hispanic or Latino (of any race)	199	2.4%

=== 2010 census ===
As of the census of 2010, there were 7,676 people, 2,827 households, and 2,126 families residing in the city. The population density was 2,199.4 inhabitants per square mile (849.2/km^{2}). There were 2,910 housing units at an average density of 833.8 per square mile (321.9/km^{2}). The racial makeup of the city was 94.2% White, 2.3% African American, 0.2% Native American, 1.2% Asian, 0.1% Pacific Islander, 0.3% from other races, and 1.7% from two or more races. Hispanic or Latino of any race were 1.3% of the population.

There were 2,827 households, of which 38.8% had children under the age of 18 living with them, 62.4% were married couples living together, 9.5% had a female householder with no husband present, 3.3% had a male householder with no wife present, and 24.8% were non-families. 21.6% of all households were made up of individuals, and 10.7% had someone living alone who was 65 years of age or older. The average household size was 2.65 and the average family size was 3.11.

The median age in the city was 44.2 years. 27.1% of residents were under the age of 18; 6.4% were between the ages of 18 and 24; 17.9% were from 25 to 44; 35.3% were from 45 to 64; and 13.3% were 65 years of age or older. The gender makeup of the city was 48.4% male and 51.6% female.

=== 2000 census ===
As of 2000 the median income for a household in the city was $72,215, and the median income for a family was $81,923. Males had a median income of $52,656 versus $36,306 for females. The per capita income for the city was $28,930. About 1.6% of families and 2.7% of the population were below the poverty line, including 2.8% of those under age 18 and 5.8% of those age 65 or over.

== Notable people ==
- Mike Baumann (born 1995), MLB baseball pitcher
- Herb Brooks, Miracle on Ice Usa coach and University of Michigan hockey coach
- Marilyn Carroll, University of Minnesota, faculty
- Ryan Chesley (born 2004), professional ice hockey player (American Hockey League) and IIHF World Junior Championship gold medalist
- Michael J. George, Minnesota state legislator
- Paul Manship, sculptor
- Richard W. O'Dea, Minnesota state legislator
- Nuni Omot (born 1994), professional basketball player (Israeli Basketball Premier League) and Olympian for South Sudan
- Justin Pierre (born 1976), lead singer of the band Motion City Soundtrack
- Ben Sobieski (born 1979), NFL football player
- Warren Strelow, goalie coach for the 1980 (gold medal) and 2002 (silver medal) US Olympic hockey teams
- Lindsey Weier (born 1984), Olympian cross country skier
