= John Drew (American politician) =

American politician (1940–1997)

John Drew (August 10, 1940 – February 24, 1997) was an American politician.

Drew lived in Saint Paul, Minnesota. He went to Central High School in Saint Paul and to the University of Minnesota. He served in the United States Army and was involved in the insurance business. Drew served on the Ramsey County Commission and was a Republican. He also served in the Minnesota House of Representatives from 1979 to 1982. Drew then served on the Saint Paul City Council from 1984 to 1988. In 1988, Drew and his wife moved to Mille Lacs Lake near Garrison, Minnesota, in Crow Wing County, Minnesota where they had owned the Rainbow Inn resort. He died from a heart attack in a hospital in St. Cloud, Minnesota and was buried at the Fort Snelling National Cemetery.

Party political offices
Preceded by Bonn Clayton	Republican nominee for Minnesota State Treasurer; 1986	Succeeded by John Burger
