= O'Dea =

Irish surname

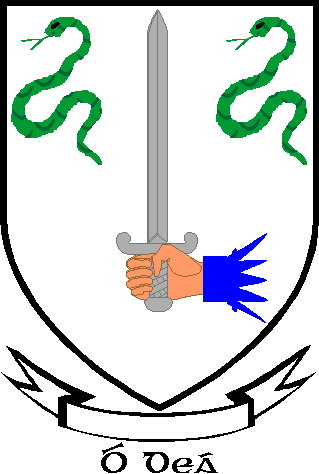
- Language: English, from Irish

Origin
- Derivation: Ó Deághaidh
- Meaning: Descendant of Deághaidh (an Irish chieftain)
- Region of origin: County Clare, Ireland

O'Dea (/oʊˈdiː/ oh-DEE; Irish: Ó Deághaidh, formerly Ua Deághaidh), is an Irish surname derived from Deághaidh, the name of a tenth-century clan chieftain. According to historian C. Thomas Cairney, the O'Deas were one of the chiefly families of the Dal gCais or Dalcassians who were a tribe of the Erainn who were the second wave of Celts to settle in Ireland between about 500 and 100 BC.

== O'Dea clan origins ==
The O'Dea clan, also found as O'Day, Dea, or Day, came originally from County Clare in Ireland where there is a fortified tower house over 500 years old known as O'Dea Castle at the 80-acre (320,000 m^{2}) townland of Dysert O'Dea (Irish: Dísert, meaning 'hermitage'). The ruins of the Dysert O'Dea Monastery, round tower, and St. Tola's high cross are 265 metres to the south-southwest of the castle in the adjacent 260-acre (1.1 km^{2}) townland of Mollaneen (Irish: Molainín, meaning 'the little hill'), near Corofin. (52.911361°N 9.066381°W)

Edward MacLysaght, the former Chief Herald of Ireland, writing in his book, Irish Families, began his discussion of the O'Dea family as follows:

O'Dea is a name associated alike in the past and at present almost exclusively with the County Clare and the areas such as Limerick City and North Tipperary which immediately adjoin it. It is not a common name anywhere and even in County Clare is not numerous outside the part of the county where it originated. This is indicated by the place names Tully O'Dea and Dysart O'Dea, the site of a famous battle in 1318. The head of the sept was chief of a considerable territory comprising much of the barony of Inchiquin. In Irish the name is Ó Deághaidh.

In another book, The Surnames of Ireland, MacLysaght describes the O'Deas as "one of the principal Dalcassian septs", and about the name itself, he remarks, "The prefix O is now almost always used, but a century ago Dea was quite usual and the surname Day was regarded as synonymous."

== Ancestry ==
The O'Deas – together with the O'Quinns (Irish: Ó Cuinn) and the O'Griffins (Irish: Ó Gríofa) – belonged to the Uí Fearmaic group, which was a branch of the Dalcassian tribe.

== See also ==
- Battle of Dysert O'Dea
- Day surname
- Irish clans
- List of people with surname O'Dea
