= Richard W. O'Dea =

American politician and businessman (1916–1998)

Richard W. O'Dea (July 17, 1916 – January 10, 1998) was an American politician and businessman.

O'Dea was born in Saint Paul, Minnesota and went to the Saint Paul public schools. He also went to University of Minnesota and took industrial training special extension courses. O'Dea worked for Seeger Refrigerator Company ad was an inspector and supervisor. He lived in Willernie, Minnesota with his wife and family and served as the mayor of Willernie. O'Dea also lived in Mahtomedi, Minnesota with his wife and family. He served in the Minnesota House of Representatives from1952 to 1972 and was a Democrat. he died from cancer,
