= Michael J. George =

American businessman and politician

Michael J. George (September 28, 1946 – June 8, 2010) was an American politician and businessman.

George was born in Saint Paul, Minnesota and went to Central High School in Saint Paul. He went to the University of Minnesota from 1964 to 1968. George lived in Mahtomedi, Minnesota with his wife and family. George was involved with the Canvas Products Association. George served on the Minnesota Real Estate Advisory Council. He served in the Minnesota House of Representatives from 1975 to 1978 and was a Democrat.
