= Stephanie O'Dea =

American blogger and food writer

Stephanie M. O'Dea
- Born: 1976 (age 49–50); California, U.S.
- Education: San Francisco State University
- Occupations: Author blogger speaker life coach
- Website: stephanieodea.com

Stephanie M. O'Dea (born 1976) is an American blogger, best-selling author and food writer, best known for slow cooking and mommy blogging. She has appeared on Good Morning America, The Rachael Ray Show, KRWM, Real Simple magazine, Woman's World, Oprah.com, and ABC.com. Her podcasts are featured on Spotify. O'Dea is an editor of Simply Gluten Free magazine and the founder of The Gluten Free Search Engine.

== Early life and career ==
A native of the San Francisco Bay Area, O'Dea received a bachelor's degree in 1999 in English language and literature from San Francisco State University. She started her career as a director in preschool centers at the Family Service Agency for at-risk children. She held that position until 2003, when she received an opportunity to write a newspaper column called Steph and Sensibility for The Tracy Press.

From 2007, when she was seeking remote work opportunities to focus on her children, until 2010, she worked as a headline editor for BlogHer.com and Bay Area Parent magazine.

In 2008, she started a blog based on her mission to use her slow cooker every day of 2008.

In October 2009, O'Dea published her first book, Make It Fast, Cook It Slow: The Big Book of Everyday Slow Cooking. The cookbook was listed for six weeks on The New York Times Best Seller list.

In 2012, her website, A Year of Slow Cooking, was ranked third on the most influential Food Blog by Cision.

In 2010, she was featured in a SharkNinja infomercial as a slow cooking expert.

== Personal life ==
O'Dea is married to Adam Elliot O'Dea, a structural engineer. They have three children and reside in Millbrae, California.

== Bibliography ==
- O'Dea, Stephanie (January 13, 2014). Real Moms Making Real Money Blogging At Home In Their Pajamas (The Mommy Blogger Next Door). CreateSpace. ISBN 978-1505696523.
- O'Dea, Stephanie (October 13, 2009). Make It Fast, Cook It Slow: The Big Book of Everyday Slow Cooking. Hachette. ISBN 978-1401394820.
- O'Dea, Stephanie (2011). Totally Together: Shortcuts to an Organized Life. Berkley Books. ISBN 978-0425241622.
- O'Dea, Stephanie (2010). More Make It Fast, Cook It Slow: 200 Brand-New, Budget-Friendly, Slow-Cooker Recipes. Hachette. ISBN 978-1401396480.
- O'Dea, Stephanie (2013). 365 Slow Cooker Suppers. Houghton Mifflin Harcourt. ISBN 978-1118230817.
- O'Dea, Stephanie (July 21, 2020). 2, 4, 6, EAT: Intermittent Fasting Simplified. CreateSpace. ISBN 979-8664507300.
- O'Dea, Stephanie (July 23, 2020). Clean Less Play More: Housekeeping for Normal People. CreateSpace. ISBN 979-8668818662.
- O'Dea, Stephanie (May 12, 2015). Going Gluten Free Without Going Crazy: Surviving and Thriving Gluten-Free. ASIN B00XKLD0PI.
- O'Dea, Stephanie (2015). Five Ingredients or Less Slow Cooker Cookbook. Houghton Mifflin Harcourt. ISBN 978-0544284227.
- O'Dea, Stephanie (2015). Five Ingredients or Less Slow Cooker Cookbook. Houghton Mifflin Harcourt; Illustrated edition. ISBN 978-0544284227.
- O'Dea, Stephanie (July 22, 2020). How to Live Slowly: Peaceful Tranquility in a Frenzied World. CreateSpace. ISBN 979-8668188444.
- O'Dea, Stephanie (July 24, 2020). The Mommy Blogger Next Door: A.K.A. How I Became The CrockPot Lady. CreateSpace. ISBN 979-8666577899.
- O'Dea, Stephanie (December 23, 2019). 30 Days to a New You: A Motivational Journal and Workbook. CreateSpace. ISBN 978-1679997693.
