= O'Dea Castle =

Fortified tower house in Ireland

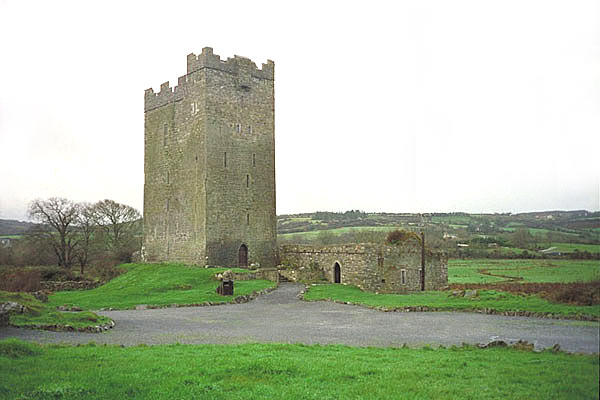
- O'Dea Castle

- Location within Ireland
- 52°54′41″N 9°3′59″W
- Location: 3 miles (5 km) south of Corofin, County Clare, Ireland

History
- Built: 1470–90

O'Dea Castle, also known as Dysert O'Dea Castle, is an Irish fortified tower house, loosely described as a castle at Dysert O'Dea (Irish: Dísert, meaning 'hermitage'), the former O'Dea clan stronghold, 5 kilometres (3 mi) from Corofin, County Clare. It was built between 1470 and 1490 by Diarmaid O'Dea, Lord of Cineal Fearmaic, and stands some 50 feet (15 m) high on a limestone outcrop base measuring 20 by 40 feet (6 by 12 m). The tower is adjacent to Dysert O'Dea Monastery, close to the R476 road.

== History ==
The Battle of Dysert O'Dea, which drove the Anglo-Normans from the region for over 200 years, took place at this site on 10 May 1318. The castle was built between 1470 and 1490 by Diarmaid O'Dea, Lord of Cineal Fearmaic. The Earl of Ormond took the castle from the O'Dea clan in 1570 by force. By 1584, however, they had regained it. At that time, Domhnall Maol O'Dea was listed as owner. Domhnall supported the northern Chiefs in the Nine Years' War of 1594-1603 and subsequently Dysert Castle fell to the Protestant Bishop of Kildare, Daniel Neylon, who in 1594 bequeathed it to his son, John. The castle soon returned to the O'Dea clan. Conor Cron O'Dea supported the Confederates and participated in the successful siege of Ballyalla Castle in 1642.

After the fall of Limerick in 1651 to the Cromwellian forces, they maintained a small garrison here. When they left, the soldiers demolished the battlements, upper floors and staircase. The Neylon family then returned but during the reign of Charles II, Conor Cron O'Dea regained the castle. Conor's sons, Michael and James, supported the cause of James II and once again lost the castle. The lands passed to the Synge family but the castle eventually and gradually fell into ruin.

In 1970, John O'Day of Wisconsin Rapids, Wisconsin (USA) purchased the tower and had it restored. The castle was then leased to the Dysert Development Association, which, with support from the Irish Tourist Board, opened it as "The Dysert O'Dea Castle Archaeology Centre" in 1986. It showed an exhibition of local artefacts from the Stone Age to 1922.

== Today ==
Today, the castle is known as the Dysert O'Dea Castle and Archaeological Trails, and is open to the public from May to August. The archeology trails include sites around the tower, including the remains of the Dysert O'Dea Monastery.

== See also ==
- Tower houses in Britain and Ireland
