= Willernie, Minnesota =

City in Minnesota, United States

Willernie
- City
- Location of the city of Willernie within Washington County, Minnesota
- Coordinates: 45°3′14″N 92°57′24″W
- Country: United States
- State: Minnesota
- County: Washington

Area
  - Total: 0.13 sq mi (0.34 km^{2})
  - Land: 0.12 sq mi (0.32 km^{2})
  - Water: 0.0039 sq mi (0.01 km^{2})
- Elevation: 968 ft (295 m)

Population (2020)
  - Total: 515
  - Density: 4,114.6/sq mi (1,588.66/km^{2})
- Time zone: UTC-6 (Central (CST))
  - Summer (DST): UTC-5 (CDT)
- ZIP code: 55090
- Area code: 651
- FIPS code: 27-70366
- GNIS feature ID: 2397314
- Website: www.willernie.org

Willernie is a city in Washington County, Minnesota, United States. It is bordered on all sides by the city of Mahtomedi. As of the 2020 census, Willernie had a population of 515.

== Geography ==
According to the United States Census Bureau, the city has a total area of 0.13 square miles (0.34 km^{2}); 0.12 square miles (0.31 km^{2}) is land and 0.01 square miles (0.03 km^{2}) is water. County 12 serves as a main route.

== Demographics ==
Historical population
Census	Pop.	Note	%±
1950	592		—
1960	664		12.2%
1970	697		5.0%
1980	654		−6.2%
1990	584		−10.7%
2000	549		−6.0%
2010	507		−7.7%
2020	515		1.6%
U.S. Decennial Census

=== 2010 census ===
As of the census of 2010, there were 507 people, 218 households, and 123 families living in the city. The population density was 4,225.0 inhabitants per square mile (1,631.3/km^{2}). There were 240 housing units at an average density of 2,000.0 per square mile (772.2/km^{2}). The racial makeup of the city was 90.1% White, 1.0% African American, 1.2% Native American, 0.4% Asian, 1.2% from other races, and 6.1% from two or more races. Hispanic or Latino of any race were 4.3% of the population.

There were 218 households, of which 29.4% had children under the age of 18 living with them, 34.9% were married couples living together, 15.6% had a female householder with no husband present, 6.0% had a male householder with no wife present, and 43.6% were non-families. 33.5% of all households were made up of individuals, and 12.8% had someone living alone who was 65 years of age or older. The average household size was 2.33 and the average family size was 2.89.

The median age in the city was 40 years. 21.9% of residents were under the age of 18; 7.6% were between the ages of 18 and 24; 26.2% were from 25 to 44; 32% were from 45 to 64; and 12.2% were 65 years of age or older. The gender makeup of the city was 51.5% male and 48.5% female.

=== 2000 census ===
As of the census of 2000, there were 549 people, 225 households, and 146 families living in the city. The population density was 4,285.3 inhabitants per square mile (1,654.6/km^{2}). There were 229 housing units at an average density of 1,787.5 per square mile (690.2/km^{2}). The racial makeup of the city was 93.26% White, 0.91% African American, 0.73% Native American, 0.36% Asian, 0.36% Pacific Islander, 0.73% from other races, and 3.64% from two or more races. Hispanic or Latino of any race were 1.09% of the population.

There were 225 households, out of which 33.8% had children under the age of 18 living with them, 43.6% were married couples living together, 15.6% had a female householder with no husband present, and 35.1% were non-families. 27.6% of all households were made up of individuals, and 6.7% had someone living alone who was 65 years of age or older. The average household size was 2.41 and the average family size was 2.95.

In the city, the population was spread out, with 25.5% under the age of 18, 6.7% from 18 to 24, 35.5% from 25 to 44, 22.2% from 45 to 64, and 10.0% who were 65 years of age or older. The median age was 36 years. For every 100 females, there were 88.7 males. For every 100 females age 18 and over, there were 88.5 males.

The median income for a family was $50,313. Males had a median income of $40,625 versus $30,714 for females. The per capita income for the city was $19,541. About 1.3% of families and 3.9% of the population were below the poverty line, including none of those under age 18 and 11.9% of those age 65 or over.
