= Robert W. Howarth =

Robert Warren Howarth is an American biogeochemist and environmental scientist. Howarth is a professor of ecology and evolutionary biology at Cornell University. He is perhaps best known for his research into methane and its impact on the climate.

In 2023, The New Yorker cited Howarth as "one of the world’s premier methane scientists." In 2011, Time named him one of that year's "people who mattered," for his research criticizing the presentation of natural gas as a "bridge-fuel" in the transition to renewable energy. His research influenced the decision of US President Joe Biden to temporarily halt any further approvals to export liquefied natural gas in January 2024. In response, The Wall Street Journal described Howarth as "the climate scientist fossil-fuel companies can’t stand."

Howarth studied oceanography at Amherst College, graduating with a Bachelor of Arts in 1974, and the Massachusetts Institute of Technology and the Woods Hole Oceanographic Institution, earning a Doctoral Degree in Biological Oceanography in 1979.

Howarth is actively involved in environmental activism, and a board member of the nonprofit Food & Water Watch.
