= Ann O'Dea =

Irish journalist and businessperson

Ann O'Dea is an Irish businesswoman, the co-founder and CEO of Silicon Republic and the CEO of Inspirefest.

== Life ==
O'Dea co-founded the Silicon Republic online newspaper for science, business and technology with Darren McAuliffe in 2001. She is a champion of diversity in science, technology, engineering and mathematics and set up the international Inspirefest conference to address inclusion at technology conferences.

Opening the fourth Inspirefest in 2018, Ireland's Minister for Health Simon Harris "emphasised the role of women in STEM (science, technology, engineering and mathematics) and said that the future was being invented by people like those at this event" in Dublin.

The fifth and final Inspirefest was in 2019. It was relaunched as Future Human in May 2020, with speakers including US astronaut Joan Higgenbotham, and Cambridge Analytica whistleblower, Brittany Kaiser.

O'Dea was awarded a fellowship of the Irish Computer Society for her work promoting women in the technology sector. She was co-inducted into the Irish Internet Association Hall of Fame with Darren McAuliffe. She was awarded Media Woman of the Year by Irish Tatler in 2014.

== Education ==
O'Dea attended University College Dublin and obtained a Bachelor of Arts degree in French (1990) and a MA in Drama & Performance Studies (1992) . In 2021, she was awarded the UCD Alumni Award in Research, Innovation and Impact.
