= Rondo Days =

Coordinates: 44°57′08″N 93°08′40″W

Rondo Days is an annual festival held the 3rd Saturday in July in Saint Paul, Minnesota, that commemorates the Rondo neighborhood, an African-American community that was split in two by the construction of Interstate 94 in the mid-1960s. The festival has grown since its inception in 1982, by co-founders Floyd G. Smaller and Marvin R. Anderson, to become the largest African American sponsored festival in Minnesota.

== History ==
The construction of Highway 94 through St. Paul in the 1960s destroyed several neighborhoods including Rondo - the backbone of the black community in the Twin Cities. Every July, Rondo days celebrate that community via an annual multi-cultural reunion, started in 1983.

With officials scrapping the 2020 festival caused by the COVID-19 pandemic, the 37th was deferred to 2021.

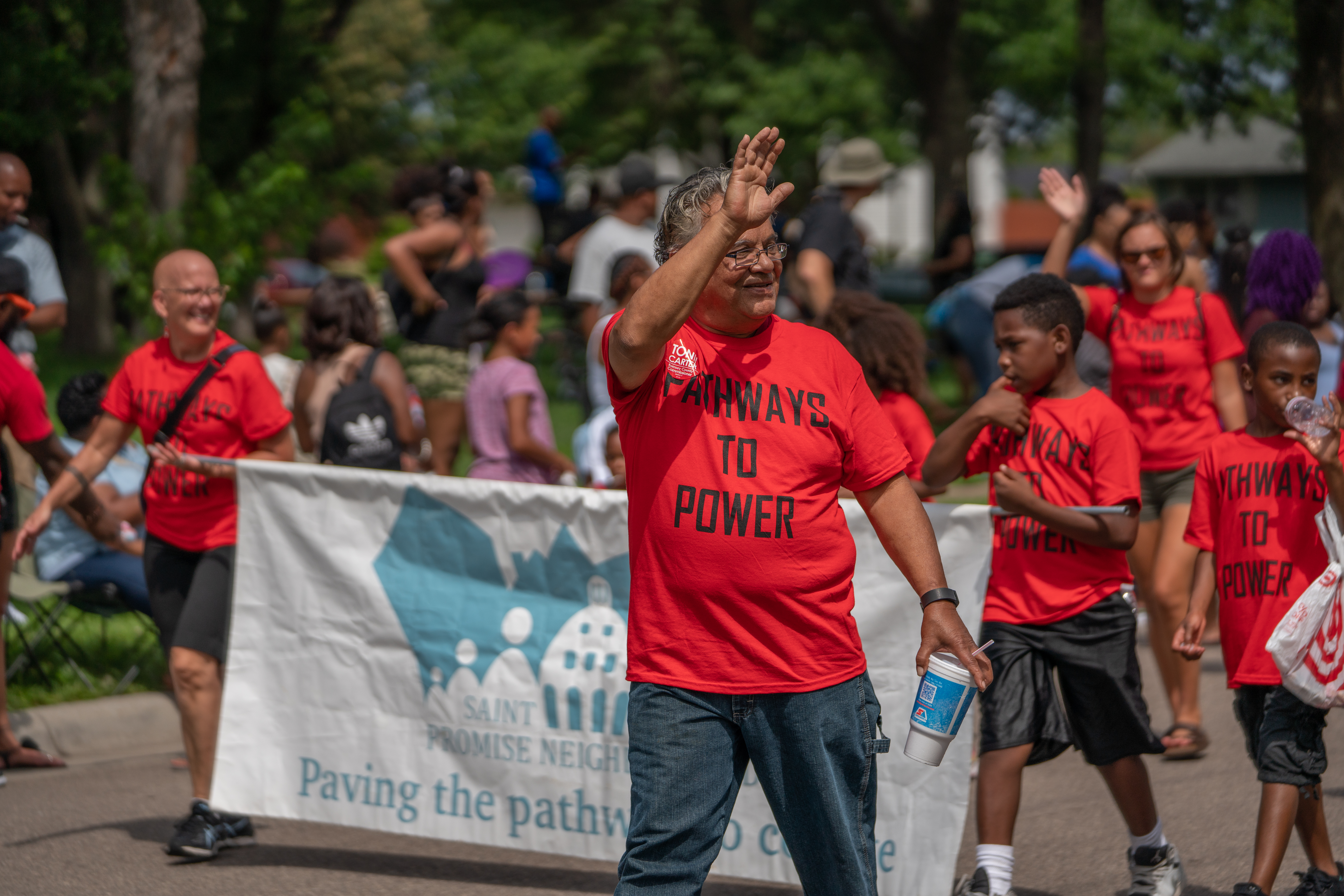
Rondo Day parade, 2018

== Festivities ==
The Rondo Days Grande Parade begins promptly at 10AM, on the 3rd Saturday of July, at St. Claver Church and ending near the MLK Rec Center Park. There is live music and food, and a drill team contest with participants from around the region. Other activities have included pony rides, a bike clinic, and petting zoo. Community partners include churches, sports teams, schools and others.
