= Battle of Dysert O'Dea =

Battle between the Irish and the Normans in 1318

Coordinates: 52.911361°N 9.066381°W

- Part of the Bruce campaign in Ireland
Date	10 May 1318
Location	O'Dea Castle near Corofin, County Clare, Ireland
Result	Gaelic Irish victory

Belligerents
Clann Ó Deághaidh; Clann Ó Briain; Clann Mac Conmara; Clann Ó hAichir	Lordship of Ireland and Gaelic allies

Commanders and leaders
Conchobhar Ó Deághaidh	Lord Thomond †

Strength
Unknown	Unknown

Casualties and losses
80 dead	400–500 dead

The Battle of Dysert O'Dea took place on 10 May 1318 at Dysert O'Dea near Corofin, Ireland. It was part of the Bruce campaign in Ireland. The Anglo-Irish Richard de Clare attacked the Gaelic Irish chieftain Conchobhar Ó Deághaidh, chief of the Cineal Fearmaic and ally of Muircheartach Ó Briain, but he was defeated.

== Precursors to war ==
The Bruce invasion of Ireland enabled the outbreak of a number of small wars that had little, if anything, pertaining to the Scots. Perhaps the most notable was the battle at Dysert O'Dea which erupted in Brian Boru's old Kingdom of Thomond in 1318.

Two factions of the O'Brien clan had been fighting for generations for supremacy in Thomond. Murtough O'Brien, the descendant of Toirdelbach Ua Briain was the rightful King of Thomond. A challenger appeared in the form of Mahon O'Brien, allied with the opposing faction of the family, which paid its homage to Brian O'Brien. This side of the family was allied with the powerful Anglo-Norman Richard de Clare, a relative of Strongbow. De Clare ruled over much of western Ireland from his castle at Bunratty, yet the English respected Thomond as a sovereign state and remained outside its borders. However, de Clare's alliance with Mahon O'Brien provided an excuse to invade Thomond. His Pale Englishmen would meet in a pitched battle against Murtough's Irish in the Battle of Dysert O'Dea.

During this time, Donnchadh, an ally of de Clare, was overwhelmingly defeated in the Battle of Lough Raska near Corcomruadh Abbey.

== Order of battle ==
When news arrived of his allies' defeat at Corcomruadh, Richard de Clare decided to attack the Gaelic stronghold at Dysert O'Dea. His troops arrived at Ruan on the morning of 10 May 1318, and were divided into three columns. The first division was headed by de Clare's son and marched northwards to Tullach O'Dea in an effort to cut off any help which might arrive from O'Connor of Ennistymon. The second column travelled southwards towards Magowna to quell any support from that direction. The third division was commanded by de Clare himself and marched westwards towards Dysert O'Dea, the home of Conor O'Dea. O'Dea intentionally made his forces look few in number, for some time fighting in retreat, and when de Clare charged for an attack the Anglo-Normans were ambushed. Richard de Clare was felled by an axe and his son was killed by a Feilim O'Connor. The O'Deas were reinforced by the O'Connors and later the O'Briens, who turned the tide of a potentially unpredictable battle along with further decisive assistance from the O'Hehir and MacNamaras; and the English were soon defeated. Following their victory, the Irish marched back to the de Clare settlement, only to find that de Clare's wife had set it aflame, including Bunratty Castle, and had returned to England.

Over eighty Englishmen of noble birth and many foot soldiers were killed in the battle. The Kingdom of Thomond remained beyond foreign control for over two hundred and fifty years, until 1570.

== See also ==
- O'Dea Castle
- O'Dea Clan
- Seán mac Ruaidhrí Mac Craith (fl. 14th-century), author of Caithréim Thoirdhealbhaigh.

== Resources ==
- O'Dea: Ua Deághaidh: The Story of a Rebel Clan, by Risteárd Ua Cróinín (Richard Cronin), Ballinakella Press, Whitegate, Co. Clare, Ireland, 1992. ISBN 0-946538-07-7.
- Irish Battles – A Military History of Ireland, by G.A. Hayes-McCoy, Appletree Press, 1990, ISBN 0-86281-250-X
- Secret Sights (Years of the Sword) RTÉ television programme transmitted 2006. Richard Cronin recounts the local understanding that a Conor Howard helped to plan and execute the ambush of De Clare and his army at Macken Bridge, Corofin (ref. O'Hivar in the Triumphs of Turlough).
