= Slievecallan =

Mountain in County Clare, Ireland

- Sliabh Calláin
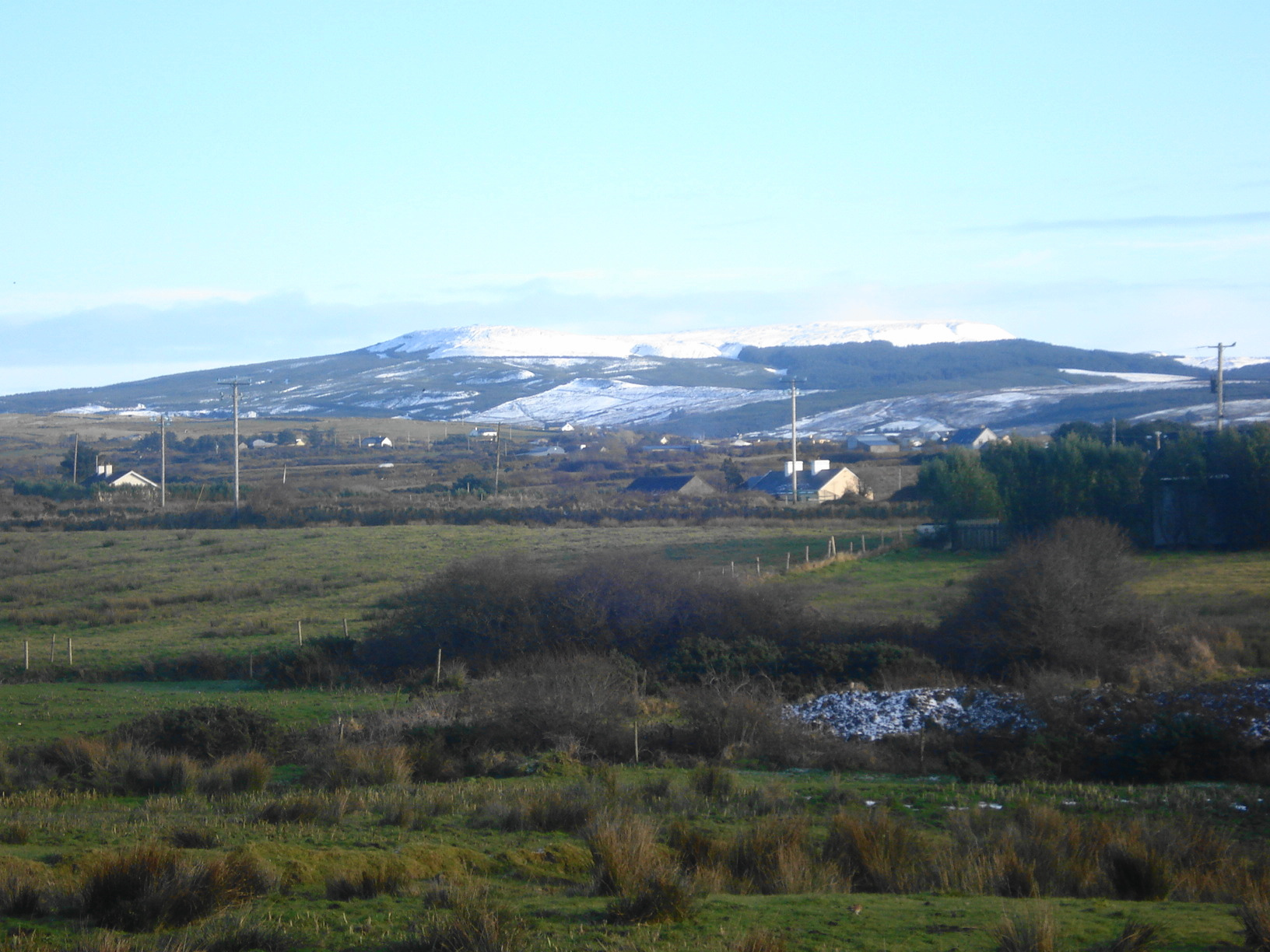
- Slievecallan in January 2010.

Highest point
- Elevation: 391 m (1,283 ft)
- Prominence: 365 m (1,198 ft)
- Listing: Marilyn
- Coordinates: 52°50′23″N 9°16′18″W

Geography
- Location within island of Ireland
- Location: County Clare, Ireland
- OSI/OSNI grid: R144773

Slievecallan or Slieve Callan (Irish: Sliabh Calláin), also historically called 'Mount Callan', is a mountain with a height of 391 metres (1,283 ft) in west County Clare, Ireland. It is the third highest mountain in the county. There is a small lake and two megalithic tombs on the south side, and traditionally the mountain was used for Lughnasa gatherings.

== Archaeology ==
On the south side of the mountain, in the townland of Knockalassa, are the remains of two megalithic tombs; one on the mountainside and one further down by the Ennis Road. Irish folklore holds that it is bad luck to damage or disrespect such tombs and that deliberately doing so could bring a curse. An ogham stone was found in the late 18th century in the same area. It was the first ogham inscription to be translated and published. The inscription claims to mark the grave of Conán, one of the fianna of Irish mythology. Charles Vallancey and Theophilus O'Flanagan published what they claimed was a poem from the medieval tale Cath Gabhra, which says that Conán was slain at Slievecallan during a ceremony to worship the sun. Michael Comyn wrote that people would gather on the mountainside, at Buaile na Gréine ("summer pasture of the Sun"), where they would sacrifice livestock to the Sun at a stone altar. A small lake on the mountainside is called Lough Boolynagreana. However, it is now accepted that the ogham stone was carved shortly before its discovery, and the Cath Gabhra poem is not found in the original. Nevertheless, the stone fueled antiquarian fieldwork and the study of ogham.

Up until recent times, people would gather on Slievecallan each August to celebrate the festival of Lughnasa.

== Geography ==
The mountain sits more or less in the centre of the triangle formed by the villages of Milltown Malbay, Inagh and Connolly, in the west of County Clare. The regional road R474 (Ennis - Connoly - Milltown Malbay), passes on the southernside of the mountain. The R460 (Gort - Inagh - Milltown Malbay) passes on the northern side.

== Environment ==
Slievecallan has a wet oceanic climate with an average annual rainfall of 2,000 mm and high average wind speeds. This is due to the proximity of the ocean (just 8 kilometres away) and its prominence in the landscape. Geologically the soils are a mixture of peat, peaty gley and gley soils over horizontal layers of carboniferous shale, sandstone, and mudstone. The soil is relatively poor in nutrients.

Without human interference the natural vegetation of this area would consist of woodlands dominated by ash (Fraxinus excelsior) in alkaline areas. Hazel (Corylus avellana) and oak (Quercus petraea) woods would be prominent in the more acidic areas. Nowadays (2014) most of the land surrounding Slievecallan is heathland, pasture and non-native forestry. The forestry is mainly plantations of Sitka spruce (Picea sitchensis)

== Windfarm ==
A wind farm on Slievecallan, with accompanying roads and substations, was approved planning permission in 2017 – despite opposition from locals and An Taisce (The National Trust). As part of the planning application, developers reportedly committed to providing €1.5 million in community funding to the communities of Milltown Malbay, Quilty and Mullagh (both in Kilmurry Ibrickane), Kilmaley and Inagh.

The wind farm consists of 29 turbines, with 11 in the "Slievecallan East" and 18 in the "Slievecallan West" developments. Completed in 2018, the wind farm was sold in 2020 by the then owners (WCRE Windfarms Ltd and Brookfield Renewable Partners) to a joint venture comprising Japan's Mitsubishi UFJ Lease & Finance Co and Arjun Alliance UK 2 LP.
