= Dysart =

Dysart or Dysert (Irish: Dísert, meaning 'hermitage') may refer to:

== Places ==
=== Australia ===
- Dysart, Queensland, a town and locality in the Isaac Region
- Dysart, Tasmania

=== Canada ===
- The United Townships of Dysart, Dudley, Harcourt, Guilford, Harburn, Bruton, Havelock, Eyre and Clyde, known for short as Dysart et al, Ontario
- Dysart, Saskatchewan

=== Ireland ===
- Dysart and Ruan, a Catholic parish in County Clare
- Dysart (civil parish), a civil parish in County Westmeath
- Dysart, County Westmeath, a village in County Westmeath
- Dysert, County Clare, a civil parish in County Clare
- Dysart, County Roscommon, a village in County Roscommon
- Diseart Diarmad, (English:Castledermot), a village in County Kildare

=== Scotland ===
- Dysart, Fife
- Dysart (Parliament of Scotland constituency), a pre-1707 constituency

=== United States ===
- Dysart, Iowa
- Dysart, Pennsylvania

== People ==
- Earl of Dysart, a Scottish peer
- Elbert Dysart Botts (1893–1962), American highway engineer ("Botts' dots")
- Michael Dysart (1934–2026), Australian architect
- Richard Dysart (1929–2015), American actor
- Tommy Dysart (1935–2022), Scots-born Australian actor
- William Dysart (1929–2002), Scottish actor

Fiction

- Martin Dysart, a character in Equus

== Other ==
- Dysart Arms, a former public house in SW London
- Dysart Buildings, Nantwich, an 18th-century terrace in Nantwich, England
- Dysart Unified School District, a school district in NW Metropolitan Phoenix
