= Dysert, County Clare =

Civil parish in County Clare, Ireland

Dysert An Díseart
- Civil parish
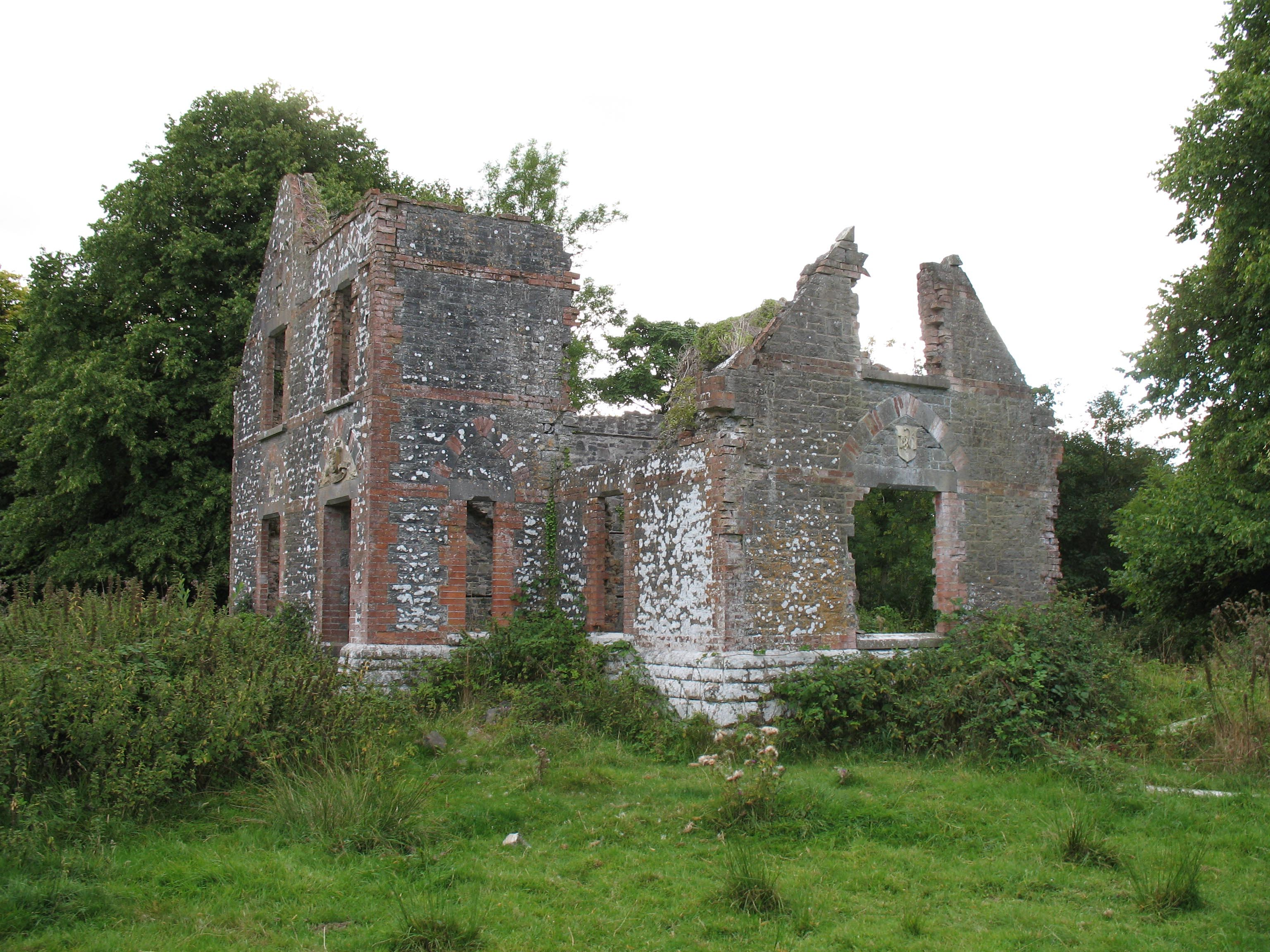
- Victorian ruins of Synge's Lodge, Dysert

- Location in Ireland
- Coordinates: 52.911316°N 9.066316°W
- Country: Ireland
- Province: Munster
- County: County Clare
- Time zone: UTC+0 (WET)
  - Summer (DST): UTC-1 (IST (WEST))
- Irish Grid Reference: R330871
- Website: www.ruan.gaa.ie/sports/home

Dysert (Irish: An Díseart, meaning 'hermitage') is a civil parish in County Clare, Ireland. The parish was formerly called Dysert O’Dea, from its having been the territory of the sept of that name. It is part of the ecclesiastical parish of Dysart and Ruan. The ruins of O'Dea Castle and a 12th-century church of Dysert O'Dea Monastery are in the townland of the same name.

== Location ==
Dysert civil parish is in the barony of Inchiquin. It is located between the villages of Corofin (to the north) and Kilnamona (to the south) on the R476 road. It is 8 kilometres (5.0 mi) from the county town - Ennis. The River Fergus flows through much of the parish. The parish of Rath is located to the north-west, Ruan to the north-east, Kilnamona to the south and Inagh to the west. The parish borders the barony of Bunratty Upper to the east at the parish of Templemaley. Dysert is part of the parish of Dysart and Ruan in the Roman Catholic Diocese of Killaloe.

== Antiquities ==
The Clare Archaeology Centre manages an archaeology and history trail that encompasses the restored 15th-century Dysert O'Dea castle, a 12th-century high cross and remains of a monastery said to have been founded in the 8th century.

In 1318 Richard De Clare decided to invade Ui Fearmaic and attack O’Dea. He reached Dysert on 10 May 1318 and was overwhelmingly defeated in the Battle of Dysert O'Dea, in which he lost his life. The English were not to return to Thomond for more than two centuries.

== Notable people ==
- Diarmuid Mac Bruideadha (Brody), Irish poet, died 1563, of Kilkee and Ballybrody
- Tom de Paor, architect, born 1967

== Townlands ==
The parish contains the townlands of Attyterrila, Aughrim Kelly, Aughrim Ross, Aughrim Toohy, Ahasla, Ballybrody, Ballycullinan, Ballygriffy (North), Ballygriffy (South), Ballynagonnaghtagh, Ballyteernau, Caherclanchy, Cappanakilla, Carhoo, Cloona, Cloontohil, Drumcurreen, Druminshin, Drummeer, Drummina, Dysert, Erinagh Beg, Erinagh More, Gortcurka, Kilcurrish, Killeenan, Knockaunanerrigal, Knockaunroe, Knockmore, Knockreagh, Magowna (East), Magowna (West), Mollaneen, Moyhullin, Rinerrinagh, Teeronaun, Toonagh, Toonagh Commons and Ross.
