= Mike McTigue =

Irish boxer (1892–1966)

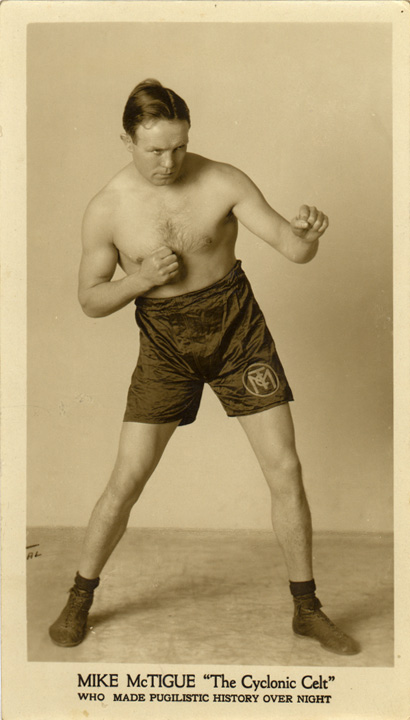

Personal information
- Nicknames: Bold Mike; Methuselah
- Nationality: Irish
- Born: Michael Francis McTigue; November 26, 1892 Kilnamona, County Clare, Ireland, U.K.
- Died: August 12, 1966 (aged 73) Queens, New York, U.S.
- Height: 5 ft 9 in (1.75 m)
- Weight: Light Heavyweight Middleweight

Boxing career
- Reach: 72 in (183cm)
- Stance: Orthodox

Boxing record
- Total fights: 174
- Wins: 111
- Win by KO: 52
- Losses: 45
- Draws: 14
- No contests: 4

"Bold" Mike McTigue (November 26, 1892 – August 12, 1966) was an Irish-American professional boxer who reigned as the undisputed light-heavyweight boxing champion of the world from 1923 to 1925. He was the first light-heavyweight champion to be recognized by The Ring, a title he held from 1924 to 1925. After his first reign ended following a loss to Paul Berlenbach, he was awarded the NYSAC world light-heavyweight title in 1927, but he lost it that same year to Tommy Loughran in his first defense.

== Early years ==
Michael Francis McTigue (Mike McTigue) was born in Lickaun, Kilnamona, in County Clare, Ireland, on 26 November 1892. He was recorded in the 1901 Census of County Clare. McTigue emigrated to America in 1912 when he was 20. He traveled as a steerage passenger of the British steamer Baltic, which arrived at the Port of New York on 21 September 1912. He was the brother of fellow boxer Jim McTigue.

== Boxing career ==
=== World light heavyweight champion ===
photographs of McTigue 's title bout victory over Battling Siki, as printed in the Chicago Tribune

Despite the Irish Civil War still ongoing, McTigue got a shot at the World Light Heavyweight Championship in 1923. The fight was held in La Scala Opera House in Prince's Street, Dublin on St. Patrick's Day against the French-Senegalese champion Battling Siki.

Nat Fleischer founder of The Ring, "It is doubtful whether a boxing contest was ever staged under such conditions... Spectators walked to the theater between rows of guards. Armored cars loomed around corners. Machine guns poked their noses from points of vantage. "After viewing newsreel footage of the fight in 1979, Robert Cantwell of Sports Illustrated concluded that Siki won more rounds and should have been declared the winner. George Kimball commented: "Under today’s scoring system, Siki might indeed have won more rounds than McTigue, but remember, [referee] Smith wasn’t handing in round-by-round totals, and his overall view was apt to be more shaped by the concluding rounds than those that had taken place more than an hour earlier."

McTigue won after 20 rounds to become the World Light Heavyweight Champion.

He would defend his title against future Hall of Famers Tommy Loughran, Young Stribling and Mickey Walker before losing the title by unanimous decision to the Olympic wrestler-turned-boxer Paul Berlenbach in 1925.

After his scheduled bout for August 11, 1927 versus reigning undisputed NBA, NYSAC and The Ring light heavyweight champion, Jack Delaney was cancelled due to Delaney vacating his titles and moving up to the heavyweight division, on July 26, 1927, the New York Athletic State Commission awarded McTigue their light heavyweight championship. McTigue lost his title in his first defense of the NYSAC light heavyweight title to Tommy Loughran on October 7, 1927.

=== Noteworthy opposition ===
McTigue fought multiple bouts in his career against the likes of Paul Berlenbach, Jeff Smith, Harry Greb, Mickey Walker and Tommy Loughran. He also earned a close decision over Tiger Flowers. In 1927, he produced his greatest performance on American soil when he knocked out the great Berlenbach in the fourth round.

== Retirement years and death ==
He was 38 years old when his boxing licence was revoked and had been fighting for 21 years. After his enforced retirement, McTigue ran a successful bar on Long Island until the late 1940s. He succumbed to poverty and ill health and was confined to various hospitals around New York for the last ten years of his life. He finally died at New York's Queen's General Hospital on August 12, 1966. He was survived by his widow and two daughters.

McTigue was honoured in his native parish when the porch of the church was named after him. Kilnamona's Community Centre was opened in 2001 and named in his honour.

== Professional boxing record ==
All information in this section is derived from BoxRec, unless otherwise stated.

=== Official record ===
174 fights	77 wins	26 losses
By knockout	52	9
By decision	23	11
By disqualification	2	6
Draws	9	
No contests	4	
Newspaper decisions/draws	58	

All newspaper decisions are officially regarded as “no decision” bouts and are not counted in the win/loss/draw column.

No.	Result	Record	Opponent	Type	Round	Date	Location	Notes
174	Loss	77–26–9 (420	Garfield Johnson	TKO	4 (10)	Sep 22, 1930	Utica Stadium, Utica, New York, U.S.	
173	Loss	77–25–9 (62)	Patsy Perroni	NWS	10	Sep 1, 1930	Canton Auditorium, Canton, Ohio, U.S.	
172	Draw	77–25–9 (61)	Tige Armen	PTS	10	Jul 1, 1930	United States of America	Exact date and location unknown
171	Win	77–25–8 (61)	George Neron	PTS	10	Jun 20, 1930	Arena, Schenectady, New York, U.S.	
170	Loss	76–25–8 (61)	Bob Godwin	PTS	10	Apr 7, 1930	Biscayne Arena, Miami, Florida, U.S.	
169	Draw	76–24–8 (61)	Tige Armen	PTS	10	Apr 2, 1930	Tinker Field, Orlando, Florida, U.S.	
168	Loss	76–24–7 (61)	Isidoro Gastanaga	KO	1 (10)	Mar 8, 1930	Arena Polar, Havana, Cuba	
167	Win	76–23–7 (61)	Ralph Schneider	KO	? (10)	Feb 14, 1930	Fort Pierce, Florida, U.S.	
166	Loss	75–23–7 (61)	Bob Godwin	PTS	10	Feb 7, 1930	Daytona Beach, Florida, U.S.	
165	Loss	75–22–7 (61)	Jeff Carroll	PTS	10	Nov 26, 1929	Legion Arena, West Palm Beach, Florida, U.S.	
164	Win	75–21–7 (61)	Emmett Curtice	KO	5 (10)	Nov 13, 1929	Armory, Grand Rapids, Michigan, U.S.	
163	Loss	74–21–7 (61)	Jack Gagnon	TKO	1 (10)	Oct 18, 1929	Boston Garden, Boston, Massachusetts, U.S.	
162	Win	74–20–7 (61)	Bobby Lyons	KO	5 (10)	Sep 25, 1929	United States of America	
161	Win	73–20–7 (61)	Jeff Richards	KO	3 (10)	Sep 17, 1929	Hopewell, Virginia, U.S.	
160	Win	72–20–7 (61)	Battling Bozo	NWS	10	Sep 9, 1929	Birmingham, Alabama, U.S.	
159	Win	72–20–7 (60)	Jimmy DeCapua	PTS	10	Sep 2, 1929	Miami Field, Miami, Florida, U.S.	
158	Win	71–20–7 (60)	Steve Thompson	KO	3 (10)	Aug 8, 1929	Manchester, New Hampshire, U.S.	
157	Loss	70–20–7 (60)	George Hoffman	KO	2 (10)	May 27, 1929	St. Nicholas Arena, New York City, New York, U.S.	
156	Win	70–19–7 (60)	Paul Hofman	PTS	10	May 13, 1929	St. Nicholas Arena, New York City, New York, U.S.	
155	Loss	69–19–7 (60)	Tuffy Griffiths	TKO	1 (10)	Sep 27, 1928	Midway Gardens, Chicago, Illinois, U.S.	
154	Loss	69–18–7 (60)	Matt Adgie	DQ	4 (10)	Jul 9, 1928	Baker Bowl, Philadelphia, Pennsylvania, U.S.	
153	Loss	69–17–7 (60)	Armand Emanuel	PTS	10	Jun 7, 1928	Madison Square Garden, New York City, New York, U.S.	
152	Draw	69–16–7 (60)	Cowboy Jack Willis	PTS	10	May 8, 1928	Olympic Auditorium, Los Angeles, California, U.S.	
151	Draw	69–16–6 (60)	Armand Emanuel	PTS	10	Apr 23, 1928	State Armory, San Francisco, California, U.S.	
150	Loss	69–16–5 (60)	Tony Marullo	PTS	10	Mar 26, 1928	St. Nicholas Arena, New York City, New York, U.S.	
149	Loss	69–15–5 (60)	Leo Lomski	PTS	10	Feb 3, 1928	Madison Square Garden, New York City, New York, U.S.	
148	Draw	69–14–5 (60)	Larry Gains	PTS	10	Nov 11, 1927	Coliseum, Toronto, Ontario, Canada	
147	Loss	69–14–4 (60)	Mickey Walker	TKO	1 (10)	Nov 1, 1927	Coliseum, Chicago, Illinois, U.S.	
146	Loss	69–13–4 (60)	Tommy Loughran	UD	15	Oct 7, 1927	Madison Square Garden, New York City, New York, U.S.	Lost NYSAC light heavyweight title
145	Win	69–12–4 (60)	Pat McCarthy	PTS	10	May 9, 1927	Madison Square Garden, New York City, New York, U.S.	
144	Loss	68–12–4 (60)	Jack Sharkey	TKO	12 (15)	Mar 3, 1927	Madison Square Garden, New York City, New York, U.S.	
143	Win	68–11–4 (60)	Paul Berlenbach	TKO	4 (10)	Jan 28, 1927	Madison Square Garden, New York City, New York, U.S.	
142	Win	67–11–4 (60)	Soldier King	KO	4 (10)	Dec 10, 1926	Armory, Grand Rapids, Michigan, U.S.	
141	Win	66–11–4 (60)	Billy Vidabeck	KO	3 (10)	Nov 15, 1926	Broadway Arena, Brooklyn, New York City, New York, U.S.	
140	Win	65–11–4 (60)	Roy Mitchell	PTS	10	Sep 29, 1926	Halifax, Nova Scotia, Canada	
139	Win	64–11–4 (60)	Emilio Solomon	KO	11 (15)	Aug 31, 1926	Queensboro Stadium, New York City, New York, U.S.	
138	Win	63–11–4 (60)	Johnny Risko	PTS	10	Jul 1, 1926	Madison Square Garden, New York City, New York, U.S.	
137	Win	62–11–4 (60)	Lou Scozza	PTS	12	Jun 11, 1926	Maple Leaf Stadium, Toronto, Ontario, Canada	
136	Loss	61–11–4 (60)	Jack Delaney	TKO	4 (10)	Mar 15, 1926	Madison Square Garden, New York City, New York, U.S.	
135	Win	61–10–4 (60)	Tiger Flowers	SD	10	Dec 23, 1925	Madison Square Garden, New York City, New York, U.S.	
134	Win	60–10–4 (60)	Tony Marullo	UD	12	Aug 22, 1925	Coney Island Stadium, Brooklyn, New York City, New York, U.S.	
133	Draw	59–10–4 (60)	Art Weigand	PTS	6	Aug 17, 1925	Bison Stadium, Buffalo, New York, U.S.	
132	Win	59–10–3 (60)	Frank Carpenter	TKO	7 (12)	Jul 17, 1925	Chadwick Park, Albany, New York, U.S.	
131	Loss	58–10–3 (60)	Paul Berlenbach	UD	15	May 30, 1925	Yankee Stadium, Bronx, New York City, New York, U.S.	Lost NYSAC, NBA, and The Ring light heavyweight titles
130	Loss	58–9–3 (60)	Mickey Walker	NWS	12	Jan 7, 1925	1st Regiment Armory, Newark, New Jersey, U.S.	NYSAC, NBA, and The Ring light heavyweight titles at stake; (via KO only)
129	Win	58–9–3 (59)	Jimmy King	TKO	4 (10)	Dec 26, 1924	Municipal Auditorium, Atlanta, Georgia, U.S.	
128	Win	57–9–3 (59)	Frank Carpenter	TKO	7 (10)	Oct 29, 1924	Marieville Gardens, North Providence, Rhode Island, U.S.	
127	Loss	56–9–3 (59)	Young Stribling	NWS	12	Mar 21, 1924	1st Regiment Armory, Newark, New Jersey, U.S.	
126	Draw	56–9–3 (58)	Young Stribling	PTS	10	Oct 4, 1923	Driving Park, Columbus, Georgia, U.S.	Retained NYSAC and NBA light heavyweight titles
125	Win	56–9–2 (58)	Tommy Loughran	NWS	12	Aug 2, 1923	Playgrounds Stadium, West New York, New Jersey, U.S.	NYSAC and NBA light heavyweight titles at stake; (via KO only)
124	Loss	56–9–2 (57)	Tommy Loughran	NWS	8	Jun 25, 1923	Shetzline Ballpark, Philadelphia, Pennsylvania, U.S.	NYSAC and NBA light heavyweight titles at stake; (via KO only)
123	Win	56–9–2 (56)	Battling Siki	PTS	20	Mar 17, 1923	La Scala Theatre, Dublin, Ireland	Won NYSAC and NBA light heavyweight titles
122	Win	55–9–2 (56)	Harry Reeve	TKO	3 (15)	Jan 15, 1923	Liverpool Stadium, Pudsey Street, Liverpool, Merseyside, England	
121	Win	54–9–2 (56)	Rocky Knight	RTD	4 (15)	Dec 28, 1922	Drill Hall, Sheffield, Yorkshire, England	
120	Win	53–9–2 (56)	Johnny Basham	KO	3 (15)	Oct 26, 1922	Drill Hall, Sheffield, Yorkshire, England	
119	Win	52–9–2 (56)	Tommy Robson	PTS	12	May 13, 1922	Queensboro Stadium, New York City, New York, U.S.	
118	Win	51–9–2 (56)	Billy Beckett	KO	3 (12)	Apr 7, 1922	4th Regiment Armory, Jersey City, New Jersey, U.S.	
117	Loss	50–9–2 (56)	Tommy Loughran	NWS	10	Mar 16, 1922	Town Hall, Scranton, Pennsylvania, U.S.	
116	Draw	50–9–2 (55)	Lou Bogash	PTS	12	Mar 11, 1922	Pioneer Sporting Club, New York City, New York, U.S.	
115	Win	50–9–1 (55)	Young Fisher	PTS	15	Feb 22, 1922	Pioneer Sporting Club, New York City, New York, U.S.	
114	Loss	49–9–1 (55)	Young Fisher	PTS	15	Jan 27, 1922	Arena, Syracuse, Pennsylvania, U.S.	
113	Win	49–8–1 (55)	Jeff Smith	PTS	15	Dec 1, 1921	Madison Square Garden, New York City, New York, U.S.	
112	Win	48–8–1 (55)	Roddy MacDonald	KO	10 (15)	Nov 10, 1921	Arena, Quebec City, Quebec, Canada	Retained Canada middleweight title
111	Win	47–8–1 (55)	Jack Stone	TKO	8 (10)	Nov 8, 1921	St. Denis Theatre, Montreal, Quebec, Canada	
110	Win	46–8–1 (55)	Buck Crouse	KO	4 (10)	Nov 2, 1921	St. Denis Theatre, Montreal, Quebec, Canada	
109	Win	45–8–1 (55)	KO Jaffe	TKO	5 (12)	Oct 29, 1921	Commonwealth Sporting Club, New York City, New York, U.S.	
108	Win	44–8–1 (55)	Buck Crouse	TKO	6 (10)	Oct 21, 1921	St. Denis Theatre, Montreal, Quebec, Canada	
107	Win	43–8–1 (55)	Gus Platts	PTS	12	Sep 26, 1921	Dyckman Oval, Manhattan, New York City, New York, U.S.	
106	Loss	42–8–1 (55)	Battling Levinsky	NWS	10	Sep 14, 1921	Mount Royal Arena, Montreal, Quebec, Canada	
105	Win	42–8–1 (54)	Panama Joe Gans	NWS	12	Sep 5, 1921	Boyle's Thirty Acres, Jersey City, New Jersey, U.S.	
104	Win	42–8–1 (53)	George Robinson	KO	4 (12)	Aug 22, 1921	St. Denis Theatre, Montreal, Quebec, Canada	
103	Win	41–8–1 (53)	Johnny Klesch	TKO	9 (10)	Jul 25, 1921	Athletic Park, Scranton, Pennsylvania, U.S.	
102	Win	40–8–1 (53)	Al Thiel	TKO	2 (12)	Jul 18, 1921	Auditorium, Freeport, New York, U.S.	
101	Win	39–8–1 (53)	Jack Mckay	KO	1 (12)	Jun 28, 1921	Commonwealth Sporting Club, New York City, New York, U.S.	
100	Draw	38–8–1 (53)	Leo Leonard	NWS	10	Jun 23, 1921	Town Hall, Scranton, Pennsylvania, U.S.	
99	Win	38–8–1 (52)	Tex Kelly	KO	4 (12)	Jun 13, 1921	Auditorium, Freeport, New York, U.S.	
98	Loss	37–8–1 (52)	Harry Krohn	DQ	11 (12)	May 9, 1921	Auditorium, Freeport, New York, U.S.	
97	Win	37–7–1 (52)	Tommy Madden	KO	1 (12)	Apr 25, 1921	Auditorium, Freeport, New York, U.S.	
96	NC	36–7–1 (52)	Vic McLaughlin	ND	8	Mar 21, 1921	United States of America	Exact date and location unknown
95	NC	36–7–1 (51)	Vic McLaughlin	ND	10	Dec 16, 1920	United States of America	Exact date and location unknown
94	Win	36–7–1 (50)	Jimmy O'Hagan	NWS	10	Dec 2, 1920	Mount Royal Arena, Montreal, Quebec, Canada	
93	Draw	36–7–1 (49)	Jack Bloomfield	NWS	10	Nov 11, 1920	Mount Royal Arena, Montreal, Quebec, Canada	
92	Win	36–7–1 (48)	Jack Bloomfield	NWS	10	Oct 20, 1920	Mount Royal Arena, Montreal, Quebec, Canada	
91	Win	36–7–1 (47)	Alex Costica	PTS	15	Oct 4, 1920	Halifax, Nova Scotia, Canada	
90	Win	35–7–1 (47)	Alex Costica	KO	5 (15)	Sep 20, 1920	Halifax, Nova Scotia, Canada	
89	Loss	34–7–1 (47)	Jeff Smith	PTS	15	Aug 10, 1920	Armouries, Halifax, Nova Scotia, Canada	
88	Win	34–6–1 (47)	Jackie Clark	PTS	15	Jul 17, 1920	Halifax, Nova Scotia, Canada	
87	Win	33–6–1 (47)	Leo Grady	KO	5 (15)	Jun 19, 1920	Halifax, Nova Scotia, Canada	
86	Win	32–6–1 (47)	Joe Eagan	PTS	15	May 13, 1920	Armouries, Halifax, Nova Scotia, Canada	
85	Win	31–6–1 (47)	Jack London	KO	3 (10)	Apr 29, 1920	Mount Royal Arena, Montreal, Quebec, Canada	
84	Win	30–6–1 (47)	Dan Ferguson	TKO	8 (15)	Apr 22, 1920	Armouries, Halifax, Nova Scotia, Canada	
83	Win	29–6–1 (47)	Eugene Brosseau	KO	5 (15)	Apr 8, 1920	Armouries, Halifax, Nova Scotia, Canada	Won Canada middleweight title
82	Win	28–6–1 (47)	Sailor Ed Petroskey	PTS	4	Mar 24, 1920	Auditorium, Oakland, California, U.S.	
81	Win	27–6–1 (47)	Jackie Clark	PTS	10	Mar 9, 1920	Halifax, Nova Scotia, Canada	
80	Win	26–6–1 (47)	Roddy MacDonald	DQ	11 (15)	Feb 17, 1920	Armouries, Halifax, Nova Scotia, Canada	
79	NC	25–6–1 (47)	Eddie Tremblay	NC	9 (10)	Jan 26, 1920	Ideal Park Pavilion, Endicott, New York, U.S.	McTigue broke his hand in the second round
78	Loss	25–6–1 (46)	Harry Greb	NWS	10	Dec 12, 1919	Ideal Park Pavilion, Endicott, New York, U.S.	
77	NC	25–6–1 (45)	Silent Martin	NC	7 (10)	Nov 5, 1919	Arena, Syracuse, New York, U.S.	Fight was declared "no contest" because the fighters allegedly were not doing their best
76	Win	25–6–1 (44)	Dan Ferguson	KO	3 (12)	Oct 31, 1919	Driving Club, Marlborough, Massachusetts, U.S.	
75	Win	24–6–1 (44)	Jackie Clark	NWS	10	Oct 23, 1919	Allentown, Pennsylvania, U.S.	
74	Win	24–6–1 (43)	Bill Hurley	KO	3 (10)	Oct 14, 1919	Bolton Hall, Troy, New York, U.S.	
73	Draw	23–6–1 (43)	Jack McCarron	NWS	10	Oct 2, 1919	Lyric Arena, Allentown, Pennsylvania, U.S.	
72	Win	23–6–1 (42)	Whitey Wenzel	NWS	6	May 19, 1919	New York A.C., New York City, New York, U.S.	
71	Win	23–6–1 (41)	Zulu Kid	NWS	10	Apr 18, 1919	Rorick's Glen Theatre, Elmira, New York, U.S.	
70	Win	23–6–1 (40)	Battling Ortega	PTS	12	Jan 27, 1919	Park Riding Academy, Boston, Massachusetts, U.S.	
69	Win	22–6–1 (40)	Dan Lynch	TKO	7 (8)	Dec 9, 1918	Grand View Auditorium, Jersey City, New Jersey, U.S.	
68	Loss	21–6–1 (40)	Frank Carbone	KO	5 (8)	Jul 9, 1918	Spring A.C., West Hoboken, New Jersey, U.S.	
67	Win	21–5–1 (40)	Frank Carbone	NWS	6	Jun 20, 1918	Madison Square Garden, New York City, New York, U.S.	
66	Win	21–5–1 (39)	Frank Carbone	NWS	8	Jun 14, 1918	Lyceum, Red Bank, New Jersey, U.S.	
65	Win	21–5–1 (38)	Tex Kelly	NWS	6	Apr 27, 1918	New York A.C., New York City, New York, U.S.	
64	Loss	21–5–1 (37)	Harry Greb	NWS	10	Mar 11, 1918	Moose Hall, Cleveland, Ohio, U.S.	
63	Loss	21–5–1 (36)	Jeff Smith	NWS	10	Nov 1, 1917	Clermont Avenue Rink, Brooklyn, New York City, New York, U.S.	
62	Loss	21–5–1 (35)	Augie Ratner	NWS	10	Sep 29, 1917	Clermont Avenue Rink, Brooklyn, New York City, New York, U.S.	
61	Win	21–5–1 (34)	Montana Dan Sullivan	NWS	10	Sep 13, 1917	Clermont Avenue Rink, Brooklyn, New York City, New York, U.S.	
60	Win	21–5–1 (33)	Frank Carbone	NWS	10	Sep 1, 1917	Clermont Avenue Rink, Brooklyn, New York City, New York, U.S.	
59	Win	21–5–1 (32)	Zulu Kid	NWS	10	Aug 18, 1917	Clermont Avenue Rink, Brooklyn, New York City, New York, U.S.	
58	Draw	21–5–1 (31)	Billy Kramer	NWS	6	Jun 18, 1917	National A.C., Philadelphia, Pennsylvania, U.S.	
57	Win	21–5–1 (30)	Jamaica Kid	NWS	10	May 25, 1917	Harlem S.C., New York City, New York, U.S.	
56	Win	21–5–1 (29)	Zulu Kid	NWS	10	May 12, 1917	Clermont Avenue Rink, Brooklyn, New York City, New York, U.S.	Not to be confused with Young Zulu Kid
55	Loss	21–5–1 (28)	Silent Martin	NWS	10	May 1, 1917	Pioneer Sporting Club, New York City, New York, U.S.	
54	Loss	21–5–1 (27)	Bob McAllister	NWS	10	Apr 3, 1917	Pioneer Sporting Club, New York City, New York, U.S.	
53	Loss	21–5–1 (26)	Hugh Ross	PTS	10	Jan 31, 1917	George Street Rink, New Haven, Connecticut, U.S.	
52	Win	21–4–1 (26)	Johnny 'Kid' Alberts	NWS	12	Jan 22, 1917	Olympic A.C., New York City, New York, U.S.	
51	Loss	21–4–1 (25)	Ed Kinley	NWS	12	Jan 22, 1917	Olympic A.C., New York City, New York, U.S.	
50	Draw	21–4–1 (24)	Joe Eagan	PTS	12	Jan 8, 1917	Tremont A.C., New Bedford, Massachusetts, U.S.	
49	Win	21–4 (24)	Frank Carbone	PTS	12	Dec 19, 1916	Rhode Island A.C., Thornton, Rhode Island, U.S.	
48	Win	20–4 (24)	Al Rogers	PTS	12	Nov 29, 1916	Rhode Island A.C., Thornton, Rhode Island, U.S.	
47	Win	19–4 (24)	Tex Kelly	NWS	10	Nov 21, 1916	Pioneer Sporting Club, New York City, New York, U.S.	
46	Loss	19–4 (23)	Tommy Robson	NWS	10	Nov 11, 1916	Fairmont A.C., Bronx, New York City, New York, U.S.	
45	Win	19–4 (22)	Jack Smith	NWS	10	Nov 3, 1916	Clermont Avenue Rink, Brooklyn, New York City, New York, U.S.	
44	Win	19–4 (21)	KO Sweeney	NWS	10	Oct 25, 1916	Pioneer Sporting Club, New York City, New York, U.S.	
43	Win	19–4 (20)	Al Thiel	KO	7 (12)	Oct 20, 1916	Bank A.C., Waterbury, Connecticut, U.S.	
42	Win	18–4 (20)	Billy Brown	NWS	10	Oct 2, 1916	Bolton Hall, Troy, New York, U.S.	
41	Win	18–4 (19)	Battling Gans	NWS	10	Sep 14, 1916	Clermont Avenue Rink, Brooklyn, New York City, New York, U.S.	
40	Win	18–4 (18)	Battling Munroe	KO	8 (10)	Sep 1, 1916	New Polo A.C., New York City, New York, U.S.	
39	Win	17–4 (18)	Willie Langford	NWS	10	Aug 21, 1916	Clermont Avenue Rink, Brooklyn, New York City, New York, U.S.	
38	Win	17–4 (17)	Willie Langford	DQ	4 (10)	Aug 3, 1916	Clermont Avenue Rink, Brooklyn, New York City, New York, U.S.	
37	Win	16–4 (17)	Willie Appleby	KO	7 (10)	Jul 24, 1916	Tottenville S.C., Staten Island, New York City, New York, U.S.	
36	Win	15–4 (17)	Jack Kelsey	NWS	10	Jun 24, 1916	Clermont Avenue Rink, Brooklyn, New York City, New York, U.S.	
35	Loss	15–4 (16)	Happy Howard	NWS	10	May 27, 1916	Queensboro A.C., New York City, New York, U.S.	
34	Win	15–4 (15)	Hippolyte Tyncke	NWS	10	May 13, 1916	St. Nicholas Arena, New York City, New York City, New York, U.S.	
33	Win	15–4 (14)	Young Carpentier	NWS	10	Mar 29, 1916	Pioneer Sporting Club, New York City, New York, U.S.	
32	Loss	15–4 (13)	Augie Ratner	NWS	10	Mar 18, 1916	Fairmont A.C., Bronx, New York City, New York, U.S.	
31	Win	15–4 (12)	Eddie McGlynn	NWS	10	Mar 6, 1916	Olympic A.C., New York City, New York, U.S.	
30	Win	15–4 (11)	Al Thiel	NWS	10	Feb 28, 1916	Pioneer Sporting Club, New York City, New York, U.S.	
29	Win	15–4 (10)	Michael Hickey	NWS	10	Feb 21, 1916	Harlem S.C., New York City, New York, U.S.	
28	Win	15–4 (9)	Billy Carter	KO	1 (10)	Jan 29, 1916	Sharkey A.C., New York City, New York, U.S.	
27	Loss	14–4 (9)	John Kraynack	DQ	5 (12)	Jan 12, 1916	Rhode Island A.C., Thornton, Rhode Island, U.S.	
26	Win	14–3 (9)	John Kraynack	PTS	12	Dec 22, 1915	Rhode Island A.C., Thornton, Rhode Island, U.S.	
25	Win	13–3 (9)	Reuben Jaffe	KO	7 (10)	Dec 10, 1915	New Polo A.C., New York City, New York, U.S.	
24	Win	12–3 (9)	Charley McGreevey	KO	1 (10)	Nov 27, 1915	Sharkey A.C., New York City, New York, U.S.	
23	Loss	11–3 (9)	Eddie Maher	DQ	2 (10)	Nov 8, 1915	Olympic A.C., New York City, New York, U.S.	
22	Win	11–2 (9)	Al Thiel	KO	7 (10)	Oct 11, 1915	Olympia Boxing Club, New York City, New York, U.S.	
21	Win	10–2 (9)	Reuben Jaffe	KO	6 (10)	Sep 13, 1915	Olympic A.C., New York City, New York, U.S.	
20	Win	9–2 (9)	Walter McGirr	NWS	10	Aug 23, 1915	Olympic A.C., New York City, New York, U.S.	
19	Win	9–2 (8)	Johnny Baker	NWS	10	Aug 9, 1915	Olympic A.C., New York City, New York, U.S.	
18	Win	9–2 (7)	Dan Tucker	KO	3 (10)	Jul 16, 1915	New Polo A.C., New York City, New York, U.S.	
17	Draw	8–2 (7)	Freddie Kiebler	NWS	10	Jun 12, 1915	Broadway Arena, Brooklyn, New York, U.S.	
16	Win	8–2 (6)	Happy Howard	NWS	10	May 21, 1915	St. Nicholas Arena, New York City, New York, U.S.	
15	Win	8–2 (5)	Paddy Sullivan	TKO	3 (10)	May 17, 1915	Olympic A.C., New York City, New York, U.S.	
14	Win	7–2 (5)	George Novick	TKO	3 (10)	Apr 12, 1915	Olympic A.C., New York City, New York, U.S.	
13	Loss	6–2 (5)	Tex Kelly	NWS	10	Apr 10, 1915	Fairmont A.C., Bronx, New York City, New York, U.S.	
12	Loss	6–2 (4)	Tommy Teague	DQ	6 (10)	Mar 20, 1915	Brown's Gym, New York City, New York, U.S.	
11	Loss	6–1 (4)	Joe Stein	NWS	10	Jan 30, 1915	Fairmont A.C., Bronx, New York City, New York, U.S.	
10	Win	6–1 (3)	George Leahy	KO	3 (10)	Jan 16, 1915	Fairmont A.C., Bronx, New York City, New York, U.S.	
9	Loss	5–1 (3)	Mike Farrell	NWS	10	Jan 5, 1915	Brown's Gym, New York City, New York, U.S.	
8	Win	5–1 (2)	Jack Emmanon	KO	2 (10)	Dec 12, 1914	Fairmont A.C., Bronx, New York City, New York, U.S.	
7	Win	4–1 (2)	Rube Howard	KO	5 (10)	Nov 1, 1914	New York, U.S.	
6	Loss	3–1 (2)	Walter McGirr	DQ	5 (10)	Oct 17, 1914	Fairmont A.C., Bronx, New York City, New York, U.S.	
5	Win	3–0 (2)	Paddy Conway	NWS	10	Aug 24, 1914	Olympic A.C., New York City, New York, U.S.	
4	Win	3–0 (1)	Rube Howard	NWS	10	Jul 13, 1914	Olympic A.C., New York City, New York, U.S.	
3	Win	3–0	Mike Greel	KO	3 (6)	May 16, 1914	New York, U.S.	
2	Win	2–0	Joe Marino	KO	1 (6)	Mar 28, 1914	New York, U.S.	
1	Win	1–0	Happy Davis	KO	3 (6)	Mar 7, 1914	Fairmont A.C., Bronx, New York City, New York, U.S.	

=== Unofficial record ===
174 fights	110 wins	45 losses
By knockout	52	9
By decision	56	30
By disqualification	2	6
Draws	15	
No contests	4	

Record with the inclusion of newspaper decisions in the win/loss/draw column.

No.	Result	Record	Opponent	Type	Round	Date	Location	Notes
174	Loss	111–45–14 (4)	Garfield Johnson	TKO	4 (10)	Sep 22, 1930	Utica Stadium, Utica, New York, U.S.	
173	Loss	111–44–14 (4)	Patsy Perroni	NWS	10	Sep 1, 1930	Canton Auditorium, Canton, Ohio, U.S.	
172	Draw	111–43–14 (4)	Tige Armen	PTS	10	Jul 1, 1930	United States of America	Exact date and location unknown
171	Win	111–43–13 (4)	George Neron	PTS	10	Jun 20, 1930	Arena, Schenectady, New York, U.S.	
170	Loss	110–43–13 (4)	Bob Godwin	PTS	10	Apr 7, 1930	Biscayne Arena, Miami, Florida, U.S.	
169	Draw	110–42–13 (4)	Tige Armen	PTS	10	Apr 2, 1930	Tinker Field, Orlando, Florida, U.S.	
168	Loss	110–42–12 (4)	Isidoro Gastanaga	KO	1 (10)	Mar 8, 1930	Arena Polar, Havana, Cuba	
167	Win	110–41–12 (4)	Ralph Schneider	KO	? (10)	Feb 14, 1930	Fort Pierce, Florida, U.S.	
166	Loss	109–41–12 (4)	Bob Godwin	PTS	10	Feb 7, 1930	Daytona Beach, Florida, U.S.	
165	Loss	109–40–12 (4)	Jeff Carroll	PTS	10	Nov 26, 1929	Legion Arena, West Palm Beach, Florida, U.S.	
164	Win	109–39–12 (4)	Emmett Curtice	KO	5 (10)	Nov 13, 1929	Armory, Grand Rapids, Michigan, U.S.	
163	Loss	108–39–12 (4)	Jack Gagnon	TKO	1 (10)	Oct 18, 1929	Boston Garden, Boston, Massachusetts, U.S.	
162	Win	108–38–12 (4)	Bobby Lyons	KO	5 (10)	Sep 25, 1929	United States of America	
161	Win	107–38–12 (4)	Jeff Richards	KO	3 (10)	Sep 17, 1929	Hopewell, Virginia, U.S.	
160	Win	106–38–12 (4)	Battling Bozo	NWS	10	Sep 9, 1929	Birmingham, Alabama, U.S.	
159	Win	105–38–12 (4)	Jimmy DeCapua	PTS	10	Sep 2, 1929	Miami Field, Miami, Florida, U.S.	
158	Win	104–38–12 (4)	Steve Thompson	KO	3 (10)	Aug 8, 1929	Manchester, New Hampshire, U.S.	
157	Loss	103–38–12 (4)	George Hoffman	KO	2 (10)	May 27, 1929	St. Nicholas Arena, New York City, New York, U.S.	
156	Win	103–37–12 (4)	Paul Hofman	PTS	10	May 13, 1929	St. Nicholas Arena, New York City, New York, U.S.	
155	Loss	102–37–12 (4)	Tuffy Griffiths	TKO	1 (10)	Sep 27, 1928	Midway Gardens, Chicago, Illinois, U.S.	
154	Loss	102–36–12 (4)	Matt Adgie	DQ	4 (10)	Jul 9, 1928	Baker Bowl, Philadelphia, Pennsylvania, U.S.	
153	Loss	102–35–12 (4)	Armand Emanuel	PTS	10	Jun 7, 1928	Madison Square Garden, New York City, New York, U.S.	
152	Draw	102–34–12 (4)	Cowboy Jack Willis	PTS	10	May 8, 1928	Olympic Auditorium, Los Angeles, California, U.S.	
151	Draw	102–34–11 (4)	Armand Emanuel	PTS	10	Apr 23, 1928	State Armory, San Francisco, California, U.S.	
150	Loss	102–34–10 (4)	Tony Marullo	PTS	10	Mar 26, 1928	St. Nicholas Arena, New York City, New York, U.S.	
149	Loss	102–33–10 (4)	Leo Lomski	PTS	10	Feb 3, 1928	Madison Square Garden, New York City, New York, U.S.	
148	Draw	102–32–10 (4)	Larry Gains	PTS	10	Nov 11, 1927	Coliseum, Toronto, Ontario, Canada	
147	Loss	102–32–9 (4)	Mickey Walker	TKO	1 (10)	Nov 1, 1927	Coliseum, Chicago, Illinois, U.S.	
146	Loss	102–31–9 (4)	Tommy Loughran	UD	15	Oct 7, 1927	Madison Square Garden, New York City, New York, U.S.	Lost NYSAC light heavyweight title
145	Win	102–30–9 (4)	Pat McCarthy	PTS	10	May 9, 1927	Madison Square Garden, New York City, New York, U.S.	
144	Loss	101–30–9 (4)	Jack Sharkey	TKO	12 (15)	Mar 3, 1927	Madison Square Garden, New York City, New York, U.S.	
143	Win	101–29–9 (4)	Paul Berlenbach	TKO	4 (10)	Jan 28, 1927	Madison Square Garden, New York City, New York, U.S.	
142	Win	100–29–9 (4)	Soldier King	KO	4 (10)	Dec 10, 1926	Armory, Grand Rapids, Michigan, U.S.	
141	Win	99–29–9 (4)	Billy Vidabeck	KO	3 (10)	Nov 15, 1926	Broadway Arena, Brooklyn, New York City, New York, U.S.	
140	Win	98–29–9 (4)	Roy Mitchell	PTS	10	Sep 29, 1926	Halifax, Nova Scotia, Canada	
139	Win	97–29–9 (4)	Emilio Solomon	KO	11 (15)	Aug 31, 1926	Queensboro Stadium, New York City, New York, U.S.	
138	Win	96–29–9 (4)	Johnny Risko	PTS	10	Jul 1, 1926	Madison Square Garden, New York City, New York, U.S.	
137	Win	95–29–9 (4)	Lou Scozza	PTS	12	Jun 11, 1926	Maple Leaf Stadium, Toronto, Ontario, Canada	
136	Loss	94–29–9 (4)	Jack Delaney	TKO	4 (10)	Mar 15, 1926	Madison Square Garden, New York City, New York, U.S.	
135	Win	94–28–9 (4)	Tiger Flowers	SD	10	Dec 23, 1925	Madison Square Garden, New York City, New York, U.S.	
134	Win	93–28–9 (4)	Tony Marullo	UD	12	Aug 22, 1925	Coney Island Stadium, Brooklyn, New York City, New York, U.S.	
133	Draw	92–28–9 (4)	Art Weigand	PTS	6	Aug 17, 1925	Bison Stadium, Buffalo, New York, U.S.	
132	Win	92–28–8 (4)	Frank Carpenter	TKO	7 (12)	Jul 17, 1925	Chadwick Park, Albany, New York, U.S.	
131	Loss	91–28–8 (4)	Paul Berlenbach	UD	15	May 30, 1925	Yankee Stadium, Bronx, New York City, New York, U.S.	Lost NYSAC, NBA, and The Ring light heavyweight titles
130	Loss	91–27–8 (4)	Mickey Walker	NWS	12	Jan 7, 1925	1st Regiment Armory, Newark, New Jersey, U.S.	NYSAC, NBA, and The Ring light heavyweight titles at stake; (via KO only)
129	Win	91–26–8 (4)	Jimmy King	TKO	4 (10)	Dec 26, 1924	Municipal Auditorium, Atlanta, Georgia, U.S.	
128	Win	90–26–8 (4)	Frank Carpenter	TKO	7 (10)	Oct 29, 1924	Marieville Gardens, North Providence, Rhode Island, U.S.	
127	Loss	89–26–8 (4)	Young Stribling	NWS	12	Mar 21, 1924	1st Regiment Armory, Newark, New Jersey, U.S.	
126	Draw	89–25–8 (4)	Young Stribling	PTS	10	Oct 4, 1923	Driving Park, Columbus, Georgia, U.S.	Retained NYSAC and NBA light heavyweight titles
125	Win	89–25–7 (4)	Tommy Loughran	NWS	12	Aug 2, 1923	Playgrounds Stadium, West New York, New Jersey, U.S.	NYSAC and NBA light heavyweight titles at stake; (via KO only)
124	Loss	88–25–7 (4)	Tommy Loughran	NWS	8	Jun 25, 1923	Shetzline Ballpark, Philadelphia, Pennsylvania, U.S.	NYSAC and NBA light heavyweight titles at stake; (via KO only)
123	Win	88–24–7 (4)	Battling Siki	PTS	20	Mar 17, 1923	La Scala Theatre, Dublin, Ireland	Won NYSAC and NBA light heavyweight titles
122	Win	87–24–7 (4)	Harry Reeve	TKO	3 (15)	Jan 15, 1923	Liverpool Stadium, Pudsey Street, Liverpool, Merseyside, England	
121	Win	86–24–7 (4)	Rocky Knight	RTD	4 (15)	Dec 28, 1922	Drill Hall, Sheffield, Yorkshire, England	
120	Win	85–24–7 (4)	Johnny Basham	KO	3 (15)	Oct 26, 1922	Drill Hall, Sheffield, Yorkshire, England	
119	Win	84–24–7 (4)	Tommy Robson	PTS	12	May 13, 1922	Queensboro Stadium, New York City, New York, U.S.	
118	Win	83–24–7 (4)	Billy Beckett	KO	3 (12)	Apr 7, 1922	4th Regiment Armory, Jersey City, New Jersey, U.S.	
117	Loss	82–24–7 (4)	Tommy Loughran	NWS	10	Mar 16, 1922	Town Hall, Scranton, Pennsylvania, U.S.	
116	Draw	82–23–7 (4)	Lou Bogash	PTS	12	Mar 11, 1922	Pioneer Sporting Club, New York City, New York, U.S.	
115	Win	82–23–6 (4)	Young Fisher	PTS	15	Feb 22, 1922	Pioneer Sporting Club, New York City, New York, U.S.	
114	Loss	81–23–6 (4)	Young Fisher	PTS	15	Jan 27, 1922	Arena, Syracuse, Pennsylvania, U.S.	
113	Win	81–22–6 (4)	Jeff Smith	PTS	15	Dec 1, 1921	Madison Square Garden, New York City, New York, U.S.	
112	Win	80–22–6 (4)	Roddy MacDonald	KO	10 (15)	Nov 10, 1921	Arena, Quebec City, Quebec, Canada	Retained Canada middleweight title
111	Win	79–22–6 (4)	Jack Stone	TKO	8 (10)	Nov 8, 1921	St. Denis Theatre, Montreal, Quebec, Canada	
110	Win	78–22–6 (4)	Buck Crouse	KO	4 (10)	Nov 2, 1921	St. Denis Theatre, Montreal, Quebec, Canada	
109	Win	77–22–6 (4)	KO Jaffe	TKO	5 (12)	Oct 29, 1921	Commonwealth Sporting Club, New York City, New York, U.S.	
108	Win	76–22–6 (4)	Buck Crouse	TKO	6 (10)	Oct 21, 1921	St. Denis Theatre, Montreal, Quebec, Canada	
107	Win	75–22–6 (4)	Gus Platts	PTS	12	Sep 26, 1921	Dyckman Oval, Manhattan, New York City, New York, U.S.	
106	Loss	74–22–6 (4)	Battling Levinsky	NWS	10	Sep 14, 1921	Mount Royal Arena, Montreal, Quebec, Canada	
105	Win	74–21–6 (4)	Panama Joe Gans	NWS	12	Sep 5, 1921	Boyle's Thirty Acres, Jersey City, New Jersey, U.S.	
104	Win	73–21–6 (4)	George Robinson	KO	4 (12)	Aug 22, 1921	St. Denis Theatre, Montreal, Quebec, Canada	
103	Win	72–21–6 (4)	Johnny Klesch	TKO	9 (10)	Jul 25, 1921	Athletic Park, Scranton, Pennsylvania, U.S.	
102	Win	71–21–6 (4)	Al Thiel	TKO	2 (12)	Jul 18, 1921	Auditorium, Freeport, New York, U.S.	
101	Win	70–21–6 (4)	Jack Mckay	KO	1 (12)	Jun 28, 1921	Commonwealth Sporting Club, New York City, New York, U.S.	
100	Draw	69–21–6 (4)	Leo Leonard	NWS	10	Jun 23, 1921	Town Hall, Scranton, Pennsylvania, U.S.	
99	Win	69–21–5 (4)	Tex Kelly	KO	4 (12)	Jun 13, 1921	Auditorium, Freeport, New York, U.S.	
98	Loss	68–21–5 (4)	Harry Krohn	DQ	11 (12)	May 9, 1921	Auditorium, Freeport, New York, U.S.	
97	Win	68–20–5 (4)	Tommy Madden	KO	1 (12)	Apr 25, 1921	Auditorium, Freeport, New York, U.S.	
96	ND	67–20–5 (4)	Vic McLaughlin	ND	8	Mar 21, 1921	United States of America	Exact date and location unknown
95	ND	67–20–5 (3)	Vic McLaughlin	ND	10	Dec 16, 1920	United States of America	Exact date and location unknown
94	Win	67–20–5 (2)	Jimmy O'Hagan	NWS	10	Dec 2, 1920	Mount Royal Arena, Montreal, Quebec, Canada	
93	Draw	66–20–5 (2)	Jack Bloomfield	NWS	10	Nov 11, 1920	Mount Royal Arena, Montreal, Quebec, Canada	
92	Win	66–20–4 (2)	Jack Bloomfield	NWS	10	Oct 20, 1920	Mount Royal Arena, Montreal, Quebec, Canada	
91	Win	65–20–4 (2)	Alex Costica	PTS	15	Oct 4, 1920	Halifax, Nova Scotia, Canada	
90	Win	64–20–4 (2)	Alex Costica	KO	5 (15)	Sep 20, 1920	Halifax, Nova Scotia, Canada	
89	Loss	63–20–4 (2)	Jeff Smith	PTS	15	Aug 10, 1920	Armouries, Halifax, Nova Scotia, Canada	
88	Win	63–19–4 (2)	Jackie Clark	PTS	15	Jul 17, 1920	Halifax, Nova Scotia, Canada	
87	Win	62–19–4 (2)	Leo Grady	KO	5 (15)	Jun 19, 1920	Halifax, Nova Scotia, Canada	
86	Win	61–19–4 (2)	Joe Eagan	PTS	15	May 13, 1920	Armouries, Halifax, Nova Scotia, Canada	
85	Win	60–19–4 (2)	Jack London	KO	3 (10)	Apr 29, 1920	Mount Royal Arena, Montreal, Quebec, Canada	
84	Win	59–19–4 (2)	Dan Ferguson	TKO	8 (15)	Apr 22, 1920	Armouries, Halifax, Nova Scotia, Canada	
83	Win	58–19–4 (2)	Eugene Brosseau	KO	5 (15)	Apr 8, 1920	Armouries, Halifax, Nova Scotia, Canada	Won Canada middleweight title
82	Win	57–19–4 (2)	Sailor Ed Petroskey	PTS	4	Mar 24, 1920	Auditorium, Oakland, California, U.S.	
81	Win	56–19–4 (2)	Jackie Clark	PTS	10	Mar 9, 1920	Halifax, Nova Scotia, Canada	
80	Win	55–19–4 (2)	Roddy MacDonald	DQ	11 (15)	Feb 17, 1920	Armouries, Halifax, Nova Scotia, Canada	
79	NC	54–19–4 (2)	Eddie Tremblay	NC	9 (10)	Jan 26, 1920	Ideal Park Pavilion, Endicott, New York, U.S.	McTigue broke his hand in the second round
78	Loss	54–19–4 (1)	Harry Greb	NWS	10	Dec 12, 1919	Ideal Park Pavilion, Endicott, New York, U.S.	
77	NC	54–18–4 (1)	Silent Martin	NC	7 (10)	Nov 5, 1919	Arena, Syracuse, New York, U.S.	Fight was declared "no contest" because the fighters allegedly were not doing their best
76	Win	54–18–4	Dan Ferguson	KO	3 (12)	Oct 31, 1919	Driving Club, Marlborough, Massachusetts, U.S.	
75	Win	53–18–4	Jackie Clark	NWS	10	Oct 23, 1919	Allentown, Pennsylvania, U.S.	
74	Win	52–18–4	Bill Hurley	KO	3 (10)	Oct 14, 1919	Bolton Hall, Troy, New York, U.S.	
73	Draw	51–18–4	Jack McCarron	NWS	10	Oct 2, 1919	Lyric Arena, Allentown, Pennsylvania, U.S.	
72	Win	51–18–3	Whitey Wenzel	NWS	6	May 19, 1919	New York A.C., New York City, New York, U.S.	
71	Win	50–18–3	Zulu Kid	NWS	10	Apr 18, 1919	Rorick's Glen Theatre, Elmira, New York, U.S.	
70	Win	49–18–3	Battling Ortega	PTS	12	Jan 27, 1919	Park Riding Academy, Boston, Massachusetts, U.S.	
69	Win	48–18–3	Dan Lynch	TKO	7 (8)	Dec 9, 1918	Grand View Auditorium, Jersey City, New Jersey, U.S.	
68	Loss	47–18–3	Frank Carbone	KO	5 (8)	Jul 9, 1918	Spring A.C., West Hoboken, New Jersey, U.S.	
67	Win	47–17–3	Frank Carbone	NWS	6	Jun 20, 1918	Madison Square Garden, New York City, New York, U.S.	
66	Win	46–17–3	Frank Carbone	NWS	8	Jun 14, 1918	Lyceum, Red Bank, New Jersey, U.S.	
65	Win	45–17–3	Tex Kelly	NWS	6	Apr 27, 1918	New York A.C., New York City, New York, U.S.	
64	Loss	44–17–3	Harry Greb	NWS	10	Mar 11, 1918	Moose Hall, Cleveland, Ohio, U.S.	
63	Loss	44–16–3	Jeff Smith	NWS	10	Nov 1, 1917	Clermont Avenue Rink, Brooklyn, New York City, New York, U.S.	
62	Loss	44–15–3	Augie Ratner	NWS	10	Sep 29, 1917	Clermont Avenue Rink, Brooklyn, New York City, New York, U.S.	
61	Win	44–14–3	Montana Dan Sullivan	NWS	10	Sep 13, 1917	Clermont Avenue Rink, Brooklyn, New York City, New York, U.S.	
60	Win	43–14–3	Frank Carbone	NWS	10	Sep 1, 1917	Clermont Avenue Rink, Brooklyn, New York City, New York, U.S.	
59	Win	42–14–3	Zulu Kid	NWS	10	Aug 18, 1917	Clermont Avenue Rink, Brooklyn, New York City, New York, U.S.	
58	Draw	41–14–3	Billy Kramer	NWS	6	Jun 18, 1917	National A.C., Philadelphia, Pennsylvania, U.S.	
57	Win	41–14–2	Jamaica Kid	NWS	10	May 25, 1917	Harlem S.C., New York City, New York, U.S.	
56	Win	40–14–2	Zulu Kid	NWS	10	May 12, 1917	Clermont Avenue Rink, Brooklyn, New York City, New York, U.S.	Not to be confused with Young Zulu Kid
55	Loss	39–14–2	Silent Martin	NWS	10	May 1, 1917	Pioneer Sporting Club, New York City, New York, U.S.	
54	Loss	39–13–2	Bob McAllister	NWS	10	Apr 3, 1917	Pioneer Sporting Club, New York City, New York, U.S.	
53	Loss	39–12–2	Hugh Ross	PTS	10	Jan 31, 1917	George Street Rink, New Haven, Connecticut, U.S.	
52	Win	39–11–2	Johnny 'Kid' Alberts	NWS	12	Jan 22, 1917	Olympic A.C., New York City, New York, U.S.	
51	Loss	38–11–2	Ed Kinley	NWS	12	Jan 22, 1917	Olympic A.C., New York City, New York, U.S.	
50	Draw	38–10–2	Joe Eagan	PTS	12	Jan 8, 1917	Tremont A.C., New Bedford, Massachusetts, U.S.	
49	Win	38–10–1	Frank Carbone	PTS	12	Dec 19, 1916	Rhode Island A.C., Thornton, Rhode Island, U.S.	
48	Win	37–10–1	Al Rogers	PTS	12	Nov 29, 1916	Rhode Island A.C., Thornton, Rhode Island, U.S.	
47	Win	36–10–1	Tex Kelly	NWS	10	Nov 21, 1916	Pioneer Sporting Club, New York City, New York, U.S.	
46	Loss	35–10–1	Tommy Robson	NWS	10	Nov 11, 1916	Fairmont A.C., Bronx, New York City, New York, U.S.	
45	Win	35–9–1	Jack Smith	NWS	10	Nov 3, 1916	Clermont Avenue Rink, Brooklyn, New York City, New York, U.S.	
44	Win	34–9–1	KO Sweeney	NWS	10	Oct 25, 1916	Pioneer Sporting Club, New York City, New York, U.S.	
43	Win	33–9–1	Al Thiel	KO	7 (12)	Oct 20, 1916	Bank A.C., Waterbury, Connecticut, U.S.	
42	Win	32–9–1	Billy Brown	NWS	10	Oct 2, 1916	Bolton Hall, Troy, New York, U.S.	
41	Win	31–9–1	Battling Gans	NWS	10	Sep 14, 1916	Clermont Avenue Rink, Brooklyn, New York City, New York, U.S.	
40	Win	30–9–1	Battling Munroe	KO	8 (10)	Sep 1, 1916	New Polo A.C., New York City, New York, U.S.	
39	Win	29–9–1	Willie Langford	NWS	10	Aug 21, 1916	Clermont Avenue Rink, Brooklyn, New York City, New York, U.S.	
38	Win	28–9–1	Willie Langford	DQ	4 (10)	Aug 3, 1916	Clermont Avenue Rink, Brooklyn, New York City, New York, U.S.	
37	Win	27–9–1	Willie Appleby	KO	7 (10)	Jul 24, 1916	Tottenville S.C., Staten Island, New York City, New York, U.S.	
36	Win	26–9–1	Jack Kelsey	NWS	10	Jun 24, 1916	Clermont Avenue Rink, Brooklyn, New York City, New York, U.S.	
35	Loss	25–9–1	Happy Howard	NWS	10	May 27, 1916	Queensboro A.C., New York City, New York, U.S.	
34	Win	25–8–1	Hippolyte Tyncke	NWS	10	May 13, 1916	St. Nicholas Arena, New York City, New York City, New York, U.S.	
33	Win	24–8–1	Young Carpentier	NWS	10	Mar 29, 1916	Pioneer Sporting Club, New York City, New York, U.S.	
32	Loss	23–8–1	Augie Ratner	NWS	10	Mar 18, 1916	Fairmont A.C., Bronx, New York City, New York, U.S.	
31	Win	23–7–1	Eddie McGlynn	NWS	10	Mar 6, 1916	Olympic A.C., New York City, New York, U.S.	
30	Win	22–7–1	Al Thiel	NWS	10	Feb 28, 1916	Pioneer Sporting Club, New York City, New York, U.S.	
29	Win	21–7–1	Michael Hickey	NWS	10	Feb 21, 1916	Harlem S.C., New York City, New York, U.S.	
28	Win	20–7–1	Billy Carter	KO	1 (10)	Jan 29, 1916	Sharkey A.C., New York City, New York, U.S.	
27	Loss	19–7–1	John Kraynack	DQ	5 (12)	Jan 12, 1916	Rhode Island A.C., Thornton, Rhode Island, U.S.	
26	Win	19–6–1	John Kraynack	PTS	12	Dec 22, 1915	Rhode Island A.C., Thornton, Rhode Island, U.S.	
25	Win	18–6–1	Reuben Jaffe	KO	7 (10)	Dec 10, 1915	New Polo A.C., New York City, New York, U.S.	
24	Win	17–6–1	Charley McGreevey	KO	1 (10)	Nov 27, 1915	Sharkey A.C., New York City, New York, U.S.	
23	Loss	16–6–1	Eddie Maher	DQ	2 (10)	Nov 8, 1915	Olympic A.C., New York City, New York, U.S.	
22	Win	16–5–1	Al Thiel	KO	7 (10)	Oct 11, 1915	Olympia Boxing Club, New York City, New York, U.S.	
21	Win	15–5–1	Reuben Jaffe	KO	6 (10)	Sep 13, 1915	Olympic A.C., New York City, New York, U.S.	
20	Win	14–5–1	Walter McGirr	NWS	10	Aug 23, 1915	Olympic A.C., New York City, New York, U.S.	
19	Win	13–5–1	Johnny Baker	NWS	10	Aug 9, 1915	Olympic A.C., New York City, New York, U.S.	
18	Win	12–5–1	Dan Tucker	KO	3 (10)	Jul 16, 1915	New Polo A.C., New York City, New York, U.S.	
17	Draw	11–5–1	Freddie Kiebler	NWS	10	Jun 12, 1915	Broadway Arena, Brooklyn, New York, U.S.	
16	Win	11–5	Happy Howard	NWS	10	May 21, 1915	St. Nicholas Arena, New York City, New York, U.S.	
15	Win	10–5	Paddy Sullivan	TKO	3 (10)	May 17, 1915	Olympic A.C., New York City, New York, U.S.	
14	Win	9–5	George Novick	TKO	3 (10)	Apr 12, 1915	Olympic A.C., New York City, New York, U.S.	
13	Loss	8–5	Tex Kelly	NWS	10	Apr 10, 1915	Fairmont A.C., Bronx, New York City, New York, U.S.	
12	Loss	8–4	Tommy Teague	DQ	6 (10)	Mar 20, 1915	Brown's Gym, New York City, New York, U.S.	
11	Loss	8–3	Joe Stein	NWS	10	Jan 30, 1915	Fairmont A.C., Bronx, New York City, New York, U.S.	
10	Win	8–2	George Leahy	KO	3 (10)	Jan 16, 1915	Fairmont A.C., Bronx, New York City, New York, U.S.	
9	Loss	7–2	Mike Farrell	NWS	10	Jan 5, 1915	Brown's Gym, New York City, New York, U.S.	
8	Win	7–1	Jack Emmanon	KO	2 (10)	Dec 12, 1914	Fairmont A.C., Bronx, New York City, New York, U.S.	
7	Win	6–1	Rube Howard	KO	5 (10)	Nov 1, 1914	New York, U.S.	
6	Loss	5–1	Walter McGirr	DQ	5 (10)	Oct 17, 1914	Fairmont A.C., Bronx, New York City, New York, U.S.	
5	Win	5–0	Paddy Conway	NWS	10	Aug 24, 1914	Olympic A.C., New York City, New York, U.S.	
4	Win	4–0	Rube Howard	NWS	10	Jul 13, 1914	Olympic A.C., New York City, New York, U.S.	
3	Win	3–0	Mike Greel	KO	3 (6)	May 16, 1914	New York, U.S.	
2	Win	2–0	Joe Marino	KO	1 (6)	Mar 28, 1914	New York, U.S.	
1	Win	1–0	Happy Davis	KO	3 (6)	Mar 7, 1914	Fairmont A.C., Bronx, New York City, New York, U.S.	

== Titles in boxing ==
=== Major world titles ===
- NYSAC light heavyweight champion (175 lbs) (2×)
- NBA (WBA) light heavyweight champion (175 lbs)

=== The Ring magazine titles ===
- The Ring light heavyweight champion (Note: The inaugural Ring light heavyweight champion.) (175 lbs)

=== Regional/International titles ===
- Canada middleweight champion (160 lbs)

=== Undisputed titles ===
- Undisputed light heavyweight champion

== See also ==
- List of light heavyweight boxing champions

== Notes ==
Awards and achievements
Preceded by Battling Siki	World Light Heavyweight Champion; 17 Mar 1923–30 May 1925	Succeeded by Paul Berlenbach
