= Inagh and Kilnamona =

Catholic parish in County Clare, Ireland

Inagh and Kilnamona Eidhneach Cill na Móna
- Catholic Parish
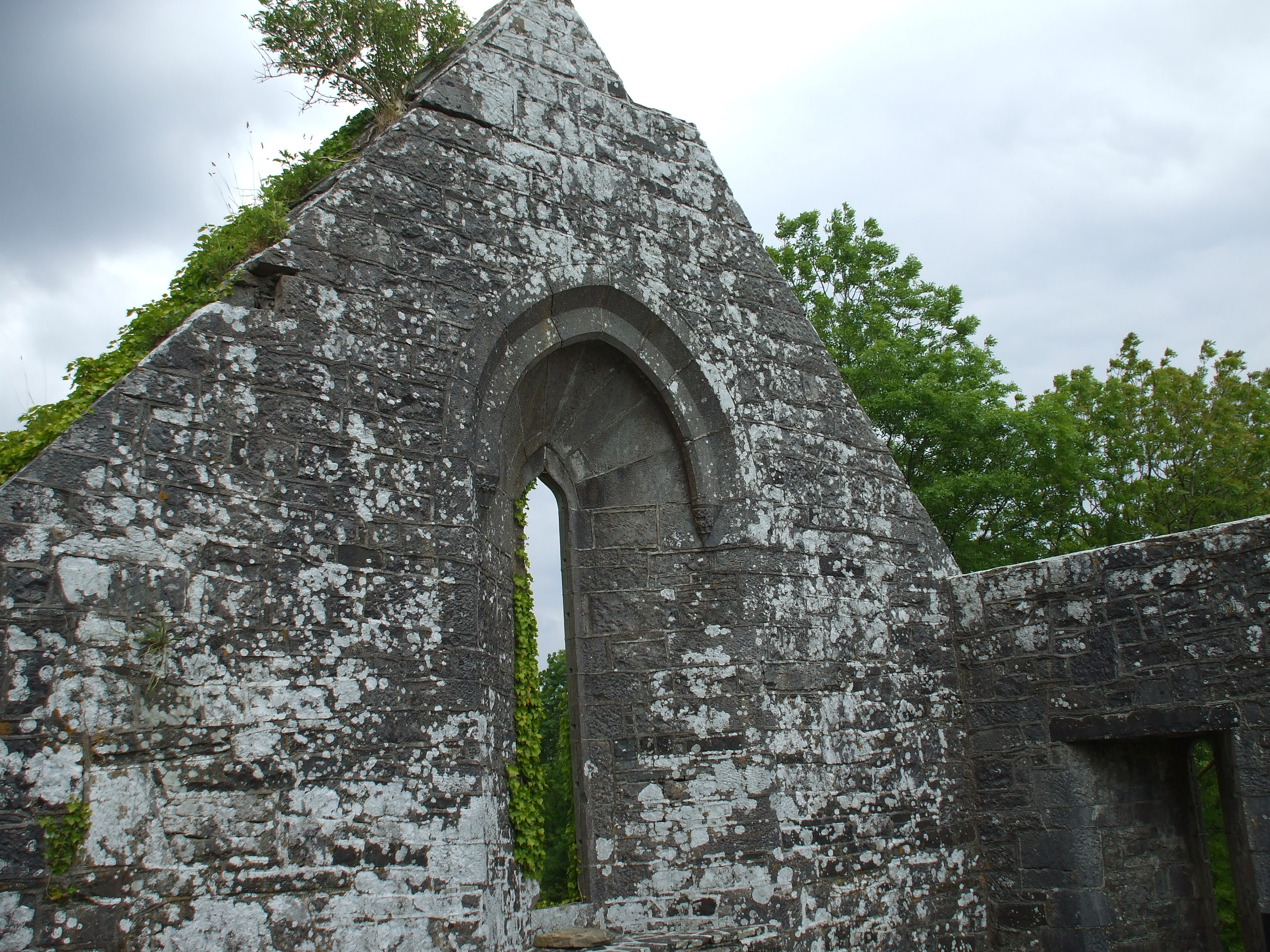
- Old church at Kilnamona

- Location in Ireland
- Coordinates: 52°52′30″N 9°10′30″W
- Country: Ireland
- Province: Munster
- County: County Clare

Population (2006)
  - Urban: 170
- Time zone: UTC+0 (WET)
  - Summer (DST): UTC-1 (IST (WEST))
- Irish Grid Reference: R205813

Inagh and Kilnamona is a parish of the Roman Catholic Diocese of Killaloe in County Clare, Ireland. It is mostly coterminous with the civil parishes of Inagh and Kilnamona that lie to the west of the county town of Ennis in the ancient barony of Inchiquin. The parish contains two churches and an oratory.

== Location ==
The parish covers an area of County Clare extending to the west of Ennis. Inagh is 6 miles (9.7 km) south-east of Ennistymon.

== History and Antiquities ==
=== Inagh ===
The original church of Eidnach was said to have been built by Mac Creiche in his old age, around 580. The chapel at Inagh, called in Irish Teampul-duv-na-h’Eidhnighe, does not seem to have had a patron saint. Fragments of the “Teampul na glas aighne” remained in 1839, but were later demolished.

Before the present church of Inagh was built there was a long, low "mass house" in the townland of Knockahaurin. The floor was used for threshing during the harvest. The present church was built in 1858. Stones from the old mass house and slates from the Killaloe quarries were used for the walls, and the roof was thatched. The church was dedicated in 1869 by Bishop Power. The high altar was installed in 1895 and the Stations of the Cross in 1905.

=== Kilnamona ===
The name "Kilnamona" means Church of the Bog. In the early Christian era, around 600 AD, the parish tribe was known as Cineal Baoith. Their patron saint was Saint Lachtain. He was from the Cork/Limerick area and it is assumed the tribe migrated from there. In 1603 the bronze arm of Saint Lachtain had to be removed to Kerry by a Franciscan for safe keeping. It is now preserved in the Royal Irish Academy.

The old church of Kilnamona is now ruined, although as of 1839 its walls were well preserved. The church is 62.5 by 21 feet (19.1 by 6.4 m). In the south wall, 17 feet (5.2 m) from the west gable, half of a pointed doorway remained. It was 6.3 feet (1.9 m) high and 3.75 feet (1.14 m) wide. The same wall held a semi-circular window with holes in the sides to hold cross iron bars. The east gable had a window about 11 feet (3.4 m) high and 7.25 feet (2.21 m) wide inside, tapering to 8.7 feet (2.7 m) high by 1.25 feet (0.38 m) wide on the outside. The walls are about 14 feet (4.3 m) feet high, 3.2 feet (0.98 m) thick and built of stones of different sizes in irregular courses.

A large cemetery is attached to the old church of Kilnamona. There is a holy well named Tobar Lachtin a small distance to the south, which was believed to have the power to cure various ailments, The well is dedicated to Saint Lachtain, whose festival is held on 19 March. There is another holy well named Tobar-na-Taise (Well of the Relic) a little way to the southwest, coffin shaped. This was thought to have the power to restore the health of delicate children if they were laid on their back in the well.

The present church of Kilnamona was built in the 19th century. Patrick Keane of Deniliquin, New South Wales, Australia, was born in Kilnamona in 1831. He donated the three paneled stained glass window depicting the Blessed Virgin, Sacred Heart and Saint Patrick, over the main altar in memory of his parents and siblings. In 2008 a sculpted bronze plaque was erected to commemorate the 100th anniversary of the birth of Brother Thomas Keane.

== Today ==
The Catholic parish of Inagh and Kilnamona is part of the Roman Catholic Diocese of Killaloe. Churches are the Immaculate Conception in Inagh, St Joseph's in Kilnamona and the Oratory of The Blessed Mary Ever Virgin in Cloonanaha.

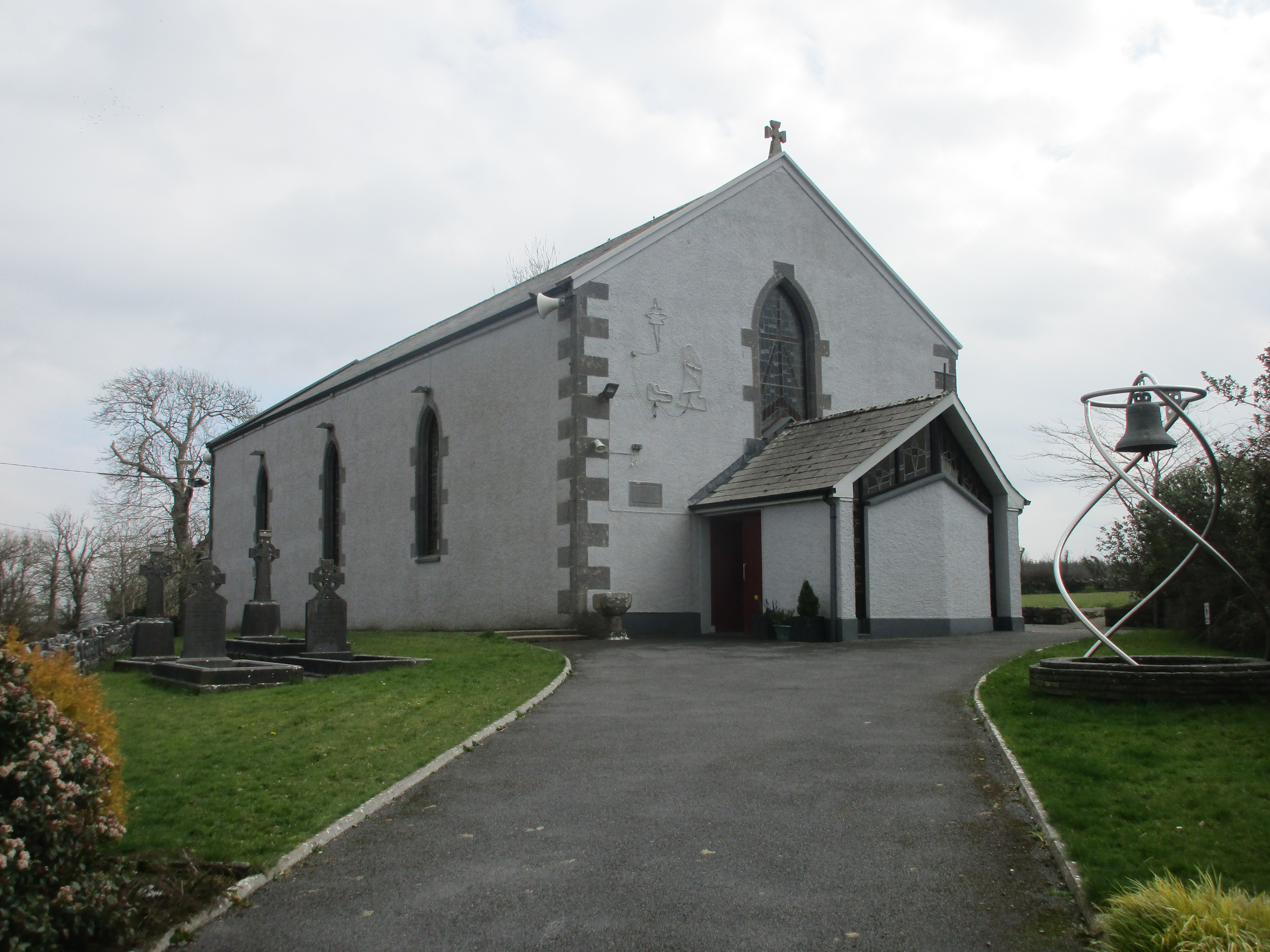
St Joseph's church in Kilnamona

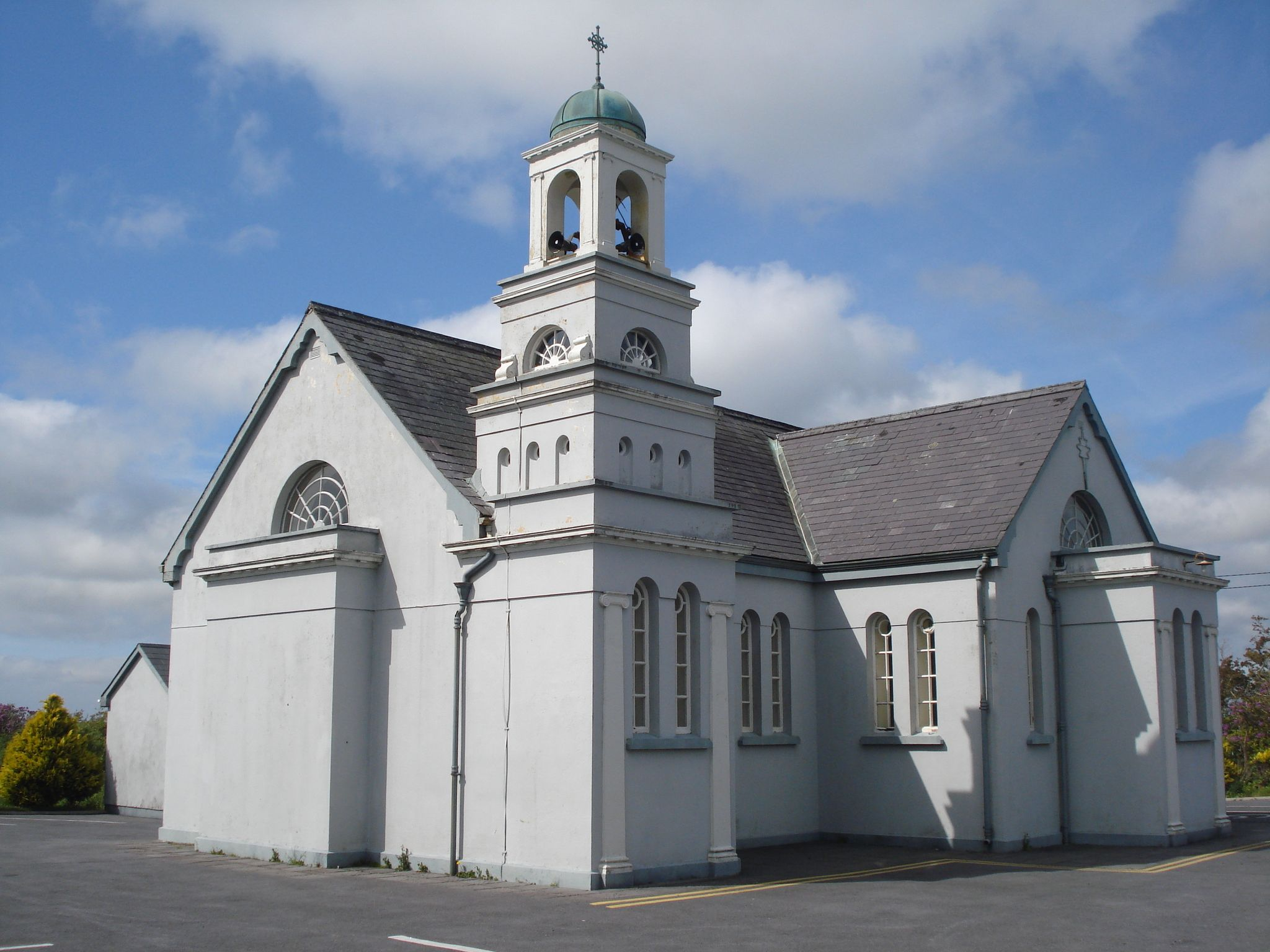
Oratory of The Blessed Mary Ever Virgin, Clounanaha
