= Kilnamona =

Village in County Clare, Ireland

Kilnamona Cill na Móna
- Civil parish and village
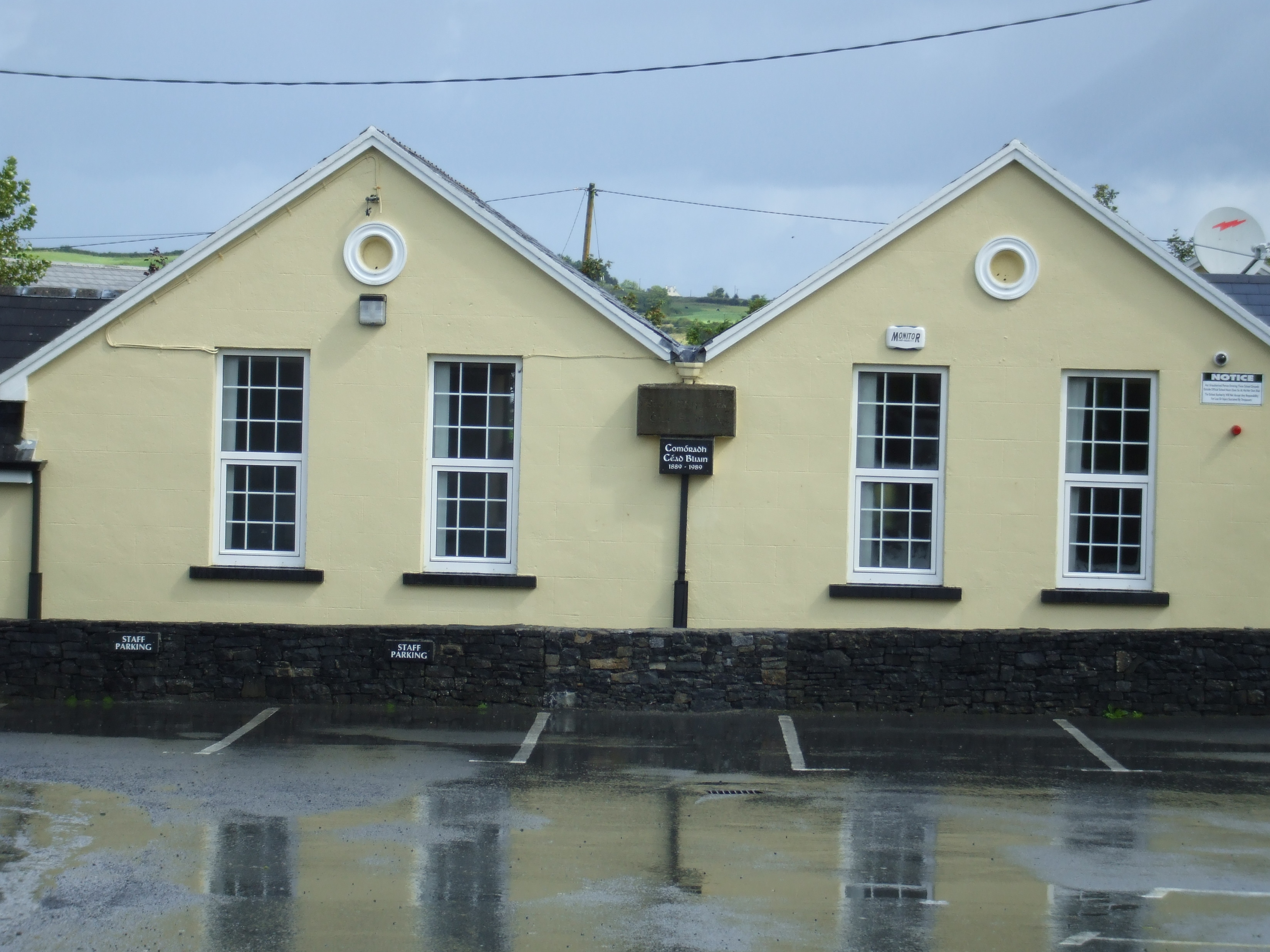
- Kilnamona School

- Location in Ireland
- Coordinates: 52.86°N 9.067°W
- Country: Ireland
- Province: Munster
- County: County Clare
- Elevation: 31 m (102 ft)

Population (2006)
  - Total: 738
- Time zone: UTC+0 (WET)
  - Summer (DST): UTC-1 (IST (WEST))
- Irish Grid Reference: R496730

Kilnamona (Irish: Cill na Móna, meaning 'church of the bog or marshy field') is a village, townland and civil parish in County Clare, Ireland. It is situated north-west of Ennis.

== Location ==
The parish of Kilnamona lies in the barony of Inchiquin, about 4 miles (6 km) northwest of Ennis. It is 4 by 2 miles (6.4 by 3.2 km) and covers 5,418 acres (2,193 ha). The 213 acres (86 ha) townland of Soheen is detached from the rest of the parish. The land is partly moorland, partly suitable for farming. Lough Aconnaun is in the west of the parish at an elevation of 178 feet (54 m). The parish is drained by the Shallee rivulet, which runs eastward.

The parish of Kilnamona is bounded to the west by the parish of Inagh, to the east by Drumcliffe, to the north by Dysert and to the south by Inch and Kilmaley. It is part of the Catholic parish of Inagh and Kilnamona.

== Village ==
Kilnamona has a camogie club. The "Cill na Móna Pitch and Putt" 18 hole course opened for business in 1995. The Catholic church of "St Joseph's" is in Kilnamona.

== History ==
The parish contains the remains of old forts, a church and two castles. The two castles are Shallee Castle and Magowna Castle. The Shallee Castle and lands were in the hands of the O'Brien family but were forfeited to Queen Elizabeth in 1592. Magowna Castle was built by the O'Griffeys who by 1443 held both the rectorship and curacy of Kilnamona.

In 1659, there were 480 inhabitants recorded (470 Catholics and 10 Protestants). The population grew rapidly up to the early 1840s, as in the rest of Ireland. In 1831 the population was 1,767. The Great Irish Famine devastated the population. The population dropped between 1841 and 1851 from 2,321 in 352 houses to 1,487 in 229 houses. By 1861 the population had declined further to 864, and then remained roughly stable for the rest of the century. By 1901 the population had shrunk to 718. According to the 2006 Census, there were 738 inhabitants of Kilnamona. This is an increase from the 699 recorded in the 2002 census.

In 1824, 141 children (139 Catholics and 2 Protestants) were being educated in the two hedge schools in the parish. The modern National School was built in 1889. Major renovations were carried out in 2008 and the extension was officially blessed by Bishop Willie Walsh in May 2009.

== Notable people ==
- James Breen (1945–2026), councillor and independent TD.
- Mike McTigue (1892–1966), light heavyweight boxing champion of the world from 1923 to 1925.

== Townlands ==
Townlands are Ballyasheea, Ballyknock, Ballymongaun, Ballynabinnia, Ballyneillan, Caherbannagh, Clooncaurha, Cloongowna, Cooguquid, Croaghaun, Derroolagh, Islandgar, Kilnamona, Knockacaurhin, Knockatemple, Leckaun, Magowna, Moarhaun, Mweelagarraun, Rushaun, Soheen, Shallee, Tooreen East and Tooreen West.
