= Cloonanaha =

Village in County Clare, Ireland

Cloonanaha Cluain an Fhathaigh
- Village
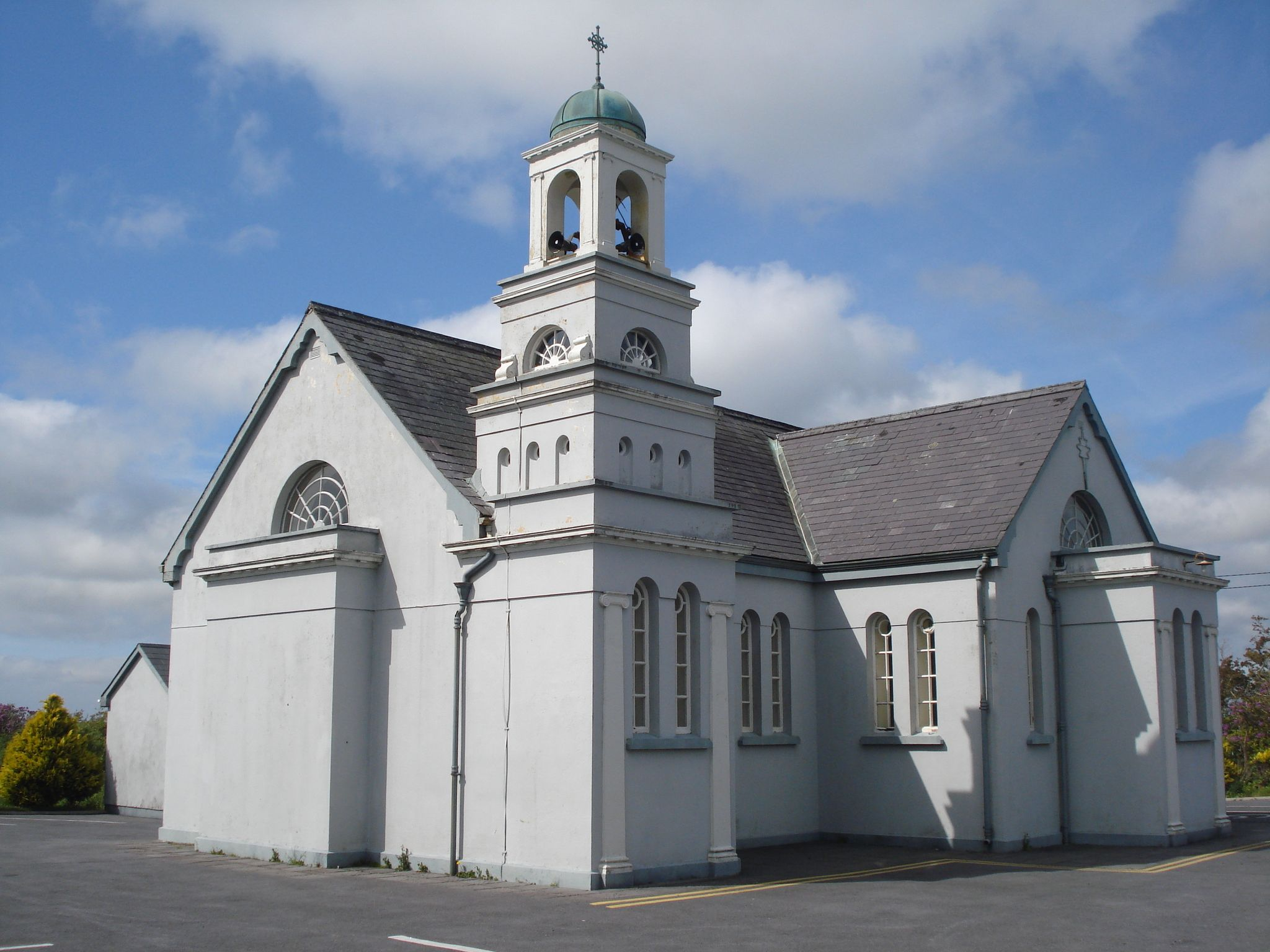
- Catholic church of Clounanaha

- Location in Ireland
- Coordinates: 52°52′03″N 9°16′29″W
- Country: Ireland
- Province: Munster
- County: County Clare

Population (2006)
  - Urban: 170
- Time zone: UTC+0 (WET)
  - Summer (DST): UTC-1 (IST (WEST))
- Irish Grid Reference: R205813

Cloonanaha (from Irish Cluain an Fhathaigh) (less often Clounanaha) is a small village and townland in County Clare, Ireland.

The village of Cloonanaha is just off the R460 road to the west of Inagh. It has a small school called Cloonanaha National School. Cloonanaha is within the civil parish of Inagh and the barony of Inchiquin. It is in the Catholic parish of Inagh and Kilnamona. It contains the Oratory of The Blessed Mary Ever Virgin.

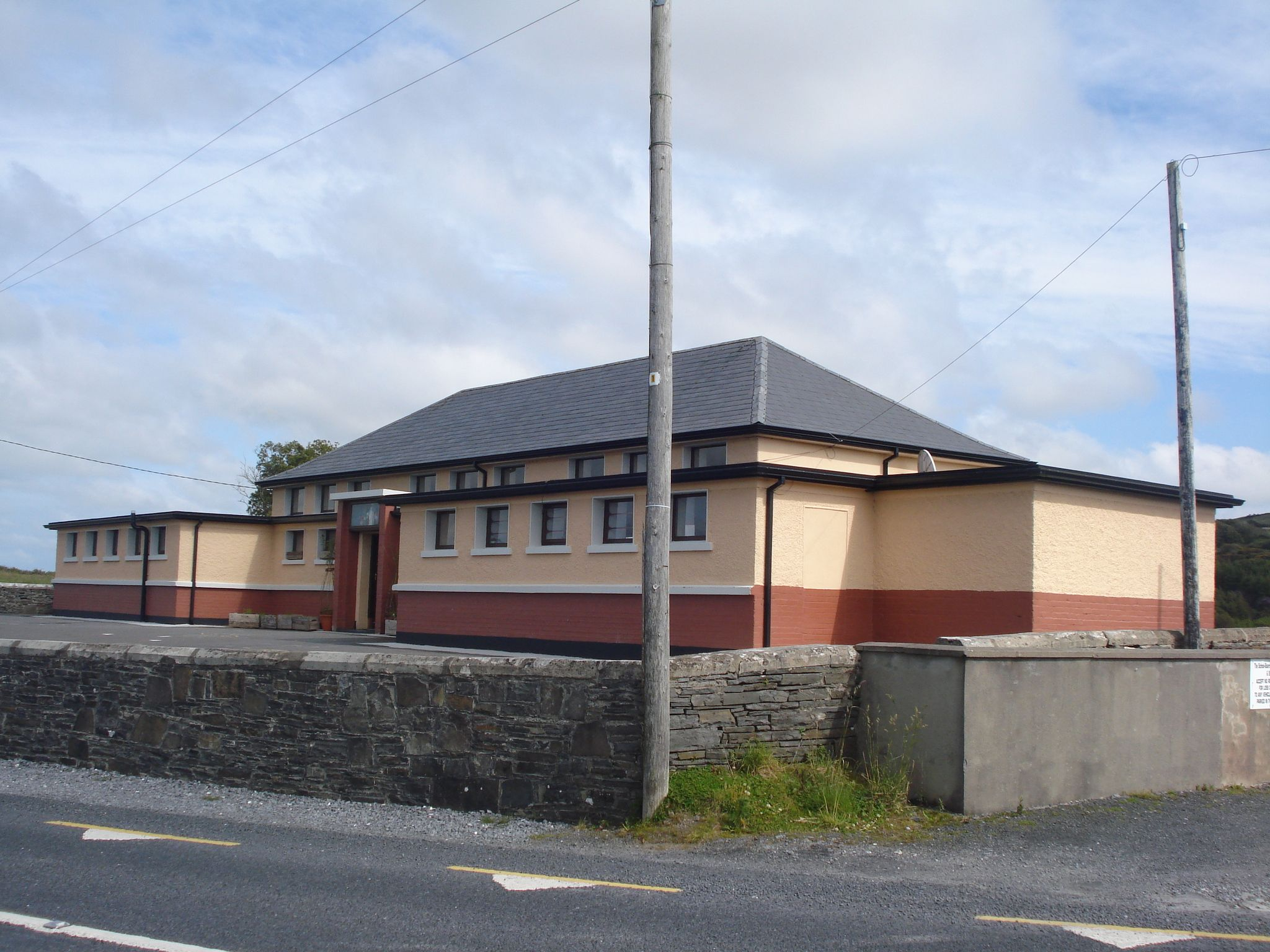
Clounanaha National School

== See also ==
- List of towns and villages in Ireland
