= Dysart and Ruan =

Catholic parish in County Clare, Ireland

- Catholic parish
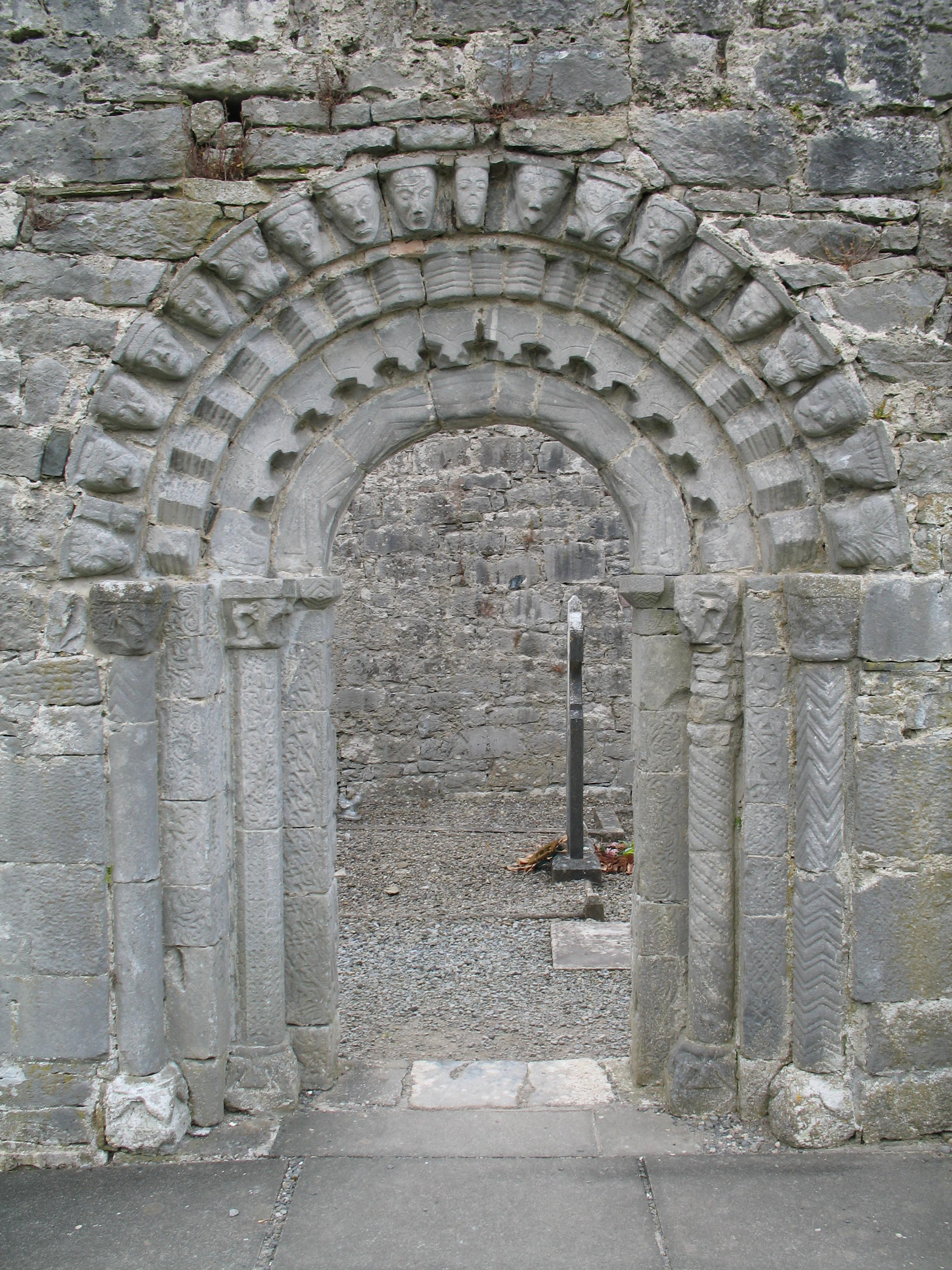
- Doorway of St. Tola's Church

- Location in Ireland
- Coordinates: 52.92926°N 8.990326°W
- Country: Ireland
- Province: Munster
- County: County Clare
- Time zone: UTC+0 (WET)
  - Summer (DST): UTC-1 (IST (WEST))
- Irish Grid Reference: R330871
- Website: www.ruan.gaa.ie/sports/home

Dysart and Ruan is a Catholic parish in County Clare, Ireland. It covers the civil parishes of Ruan and Dysert, and includes the village of Ruan, which holds the parish office. The parish contains the ruins of the 12th century St. Tola's Church, part of Dysert O'Dea Monastery.

== Location ==
The parish lies to the north of Ennis on the road to Corofin. The River Fergus runs through most of the parish, through Tedane and other lakes, to Clarecastle. In 1837 there were police stations in Dysert and Ruan, and chapels in each place. The chapel in Ruan had been rebuilt by public subscription in 1834. The parish includes the civil parishes of Ruan and Dysert. Dysert is sometimes called Dysert O'Dea, since it was part of the territory of the O'Dea sept. Ruan is near the Burren and between Corofin, Crusheen and Ennis. The name "Ruan" (An Ruadhán) is an old Irish term for the alder tree, at one time used to make red dye.

== Antiquities ==
=== Dysert O'Dea Church ===
The ruined Church of Disert consists of a nave 71 by 24 feet (21.6 by 7.3 m) and a choir 25.5 by 21.3 feet (7.8 by 6.5 m). It was described by Eugene Curry in 1839. At that time the walls were in perfect condition, about 14 feet (4.3 m) high and 3.1 feet (0.94 m) thick. The west gable has a window, completely covered in ivy inside and out. In the south wall at a distance of 13.8 feet (4.2 m) from the west gable there is a beautifully sculpted door 6.8 feet (2.1 m) high and 3.2 feet (0.98 m) wide. The door has four circular arches, one over the other, resting on columns at the sides of the door. The columns are surmounted by human heads. The largest arch has nineteen stones that project a small way from the wall. They are carved with twelve human and seven animal heads.

The choir in 1839 had a beautiful circular arch built with finely cut grit-stone, about 14.5 feet (4.4 m) wide and the same height. The gable had a double-headed curvilinear pointed belfry. There were pointed windows in the north wall of nave and in the south side of quire near the east gable. The window in the east gable was 11.2 feet (3.4 m) wide and about 15 feet (4.6 m) high, divided into three compartments by two triangular pillars of masonry and lined all round with the same sort of cut stones as those in the choir arch, but looking somewhat fresher. According to tradition the choir was added to the Church by O'Dea.

=== White Cross of Tola ===
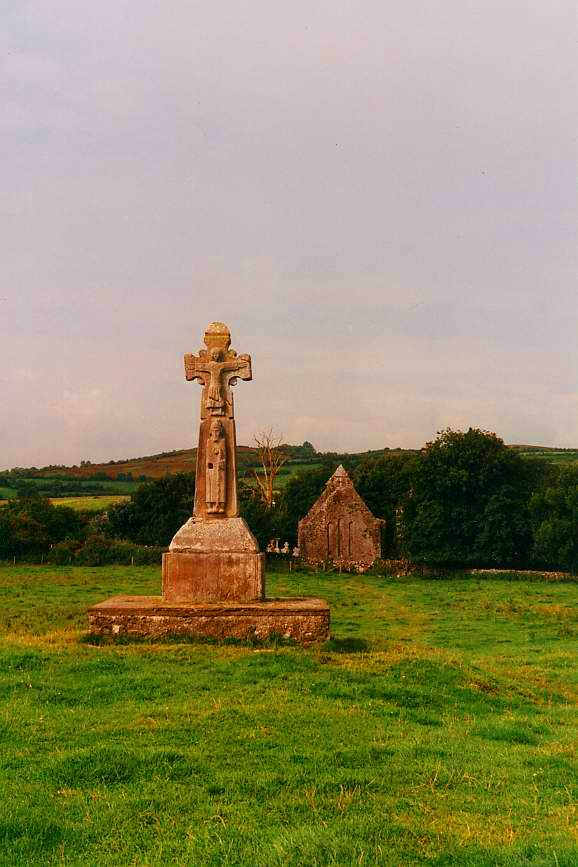
White Cross of Tola

About a mile east of the Church of Disert there is a deserted burying ground, near the old chapel, called Mainistir-na-Sratha-Duibhe (Monastery of the Black Sward). There is a Holy Well near it called Tobar Oireachta at which Stations were still performed in 1839. Nearby to the north is a small elevated spot called Cnocan-na-Croise (Height of the Cross), on which a Celtic cross was erected. Part of the shaft remained standing in 1839 about 2 feet (0.61 m) high. The ancient cross lay on the ground.

The cross was re-erected in 1871 by Francis Hutcheson Synge of Dysert. The shaft of the cross is 6.2 by 2.1 feet (1.89 by 0.64 m) and the head is 3.5 feet (1.1 m) high. The north and south sides of the cross are cut into patterns. The north side includes a crude carving of two men swearing on a staff between another man and a bishop. The west side has two heads, but otherwise the carvings have been broken off. The east side has a figure of Christ, with outstretched arms. Below that is a large figure of Saint Tola of Clonard, the Bishop of Clonard and the founder and patron of the Dysert church. Tola died between 733 and 737.

=== Ruan Church ===
The ruined Church of Ruan stands in the Ruan townland of the Ruan civil parish. It is 55.3 by 19.5 feet (16.9 by 5.9 m) in area. As of 1839 the walls stood at their original height apart from the west gable, the top of which is broken off. There was a pointed doorway in the south side near the west gable, and a square one in the same side near the east gable. There is a double pointed window in the east gable, but its mullion is gone. There is a portion of the north wall elevated six feet above the rest, as if for the purpose of a ball-alley. There is a little Chapel projecting to the south from the south west angle, nineteen feet six inches long and sixteen feet three inches broad having a pointed door in its east side and elevated tomb in its north end, with a monumental stone over it in the Church wall, exhibiting the following inscription: "This Chapel and tomb were erected by Donogh O’Kerine, the son of Dermot O’Kerine of Owan, for him and his posterities’ use in the year of our Lord God, 1688." There is no patron saint associated with this church, and no holy well dedicated to any particular saint nearby. The only holy wells in the area were named after the townlands.

== Today ==
Dysart and Ruan is a parish in the Roman Catholic Diocese of Killaloe. The parish office is in the village of Ruan. The parish churches are St Mary's in Ruan and St Tola in Dysart. The parish runs two primary schools, Ruan National School and Toonagh National School. The parish is home to the Ruan GAA, a Gaelic Athletic Association club, which fields teams in Hurling and Camogie competitions.

The church of St. Marys in Ruan was built in 1912. It replaced the 1834 church. The stained glass windows behind the altar that were made by Franz Mayer & Co. of Munich, Germany. They were formerly in the chapel of St. Xaviers Convent of Mercy in Ennis, and were moved to Ruan in the 1990s when the convent was closed. The window on the left shows the Nativity. That in the center is the Sacred Heart, and includes sheaves of wheat, grapes and a chalice, symbols of the consecration. The window on the right depicts life in the house of the Holy Family. Mary is working on the loom and Joseph is working on carpentry with Jesus by his side.

== Gallery ==
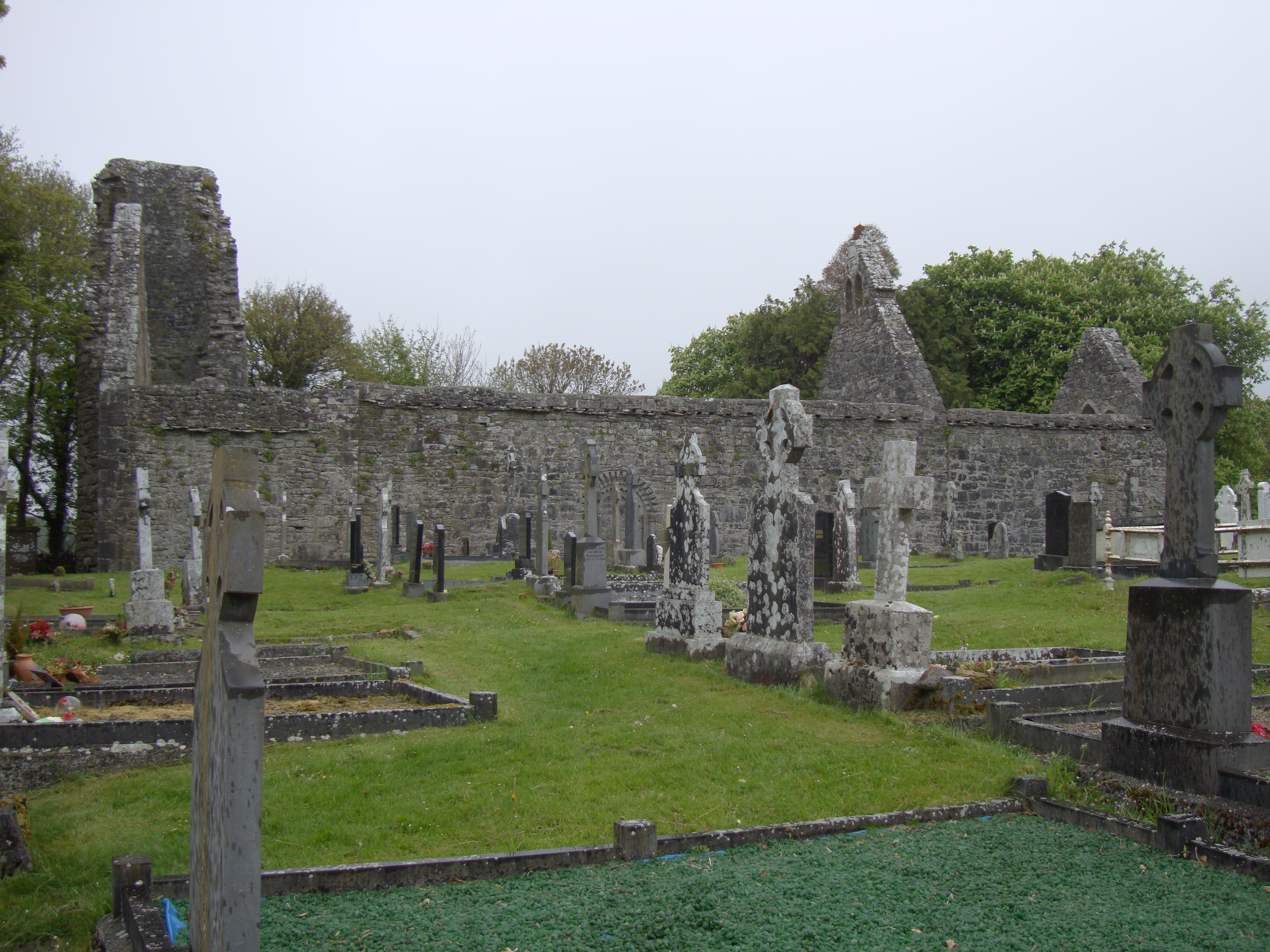
Graveyard and remains of Dysert O'Dea Church

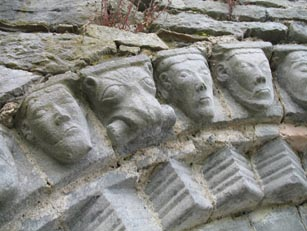
Detail of carved heads over the door in Dysert O'Dea Church

== Sources ==
- Curry, Eugene (1839). "The Burren: Dysert O'Dea Church". The antiquities of County Clare': letters containing information relative to the antiquities of the County of Clare collected during the progress of the Ordnance Survey in 1839.
- "Dysart & Ruan". Killaloe Diocese.
- "Dysart & Ruan, Churches". Diocese of Killaloe. Archived from the original on 7 April 2014.
- "Home". Ruan GAA.
- Lewis, Samuel (1840). "Dysert, or Dysart". A topographical dictionary of Ireland: comprising the several counties, cities, boroughs corporate, market, and post towns, parishes and villages ... : With an appendix describing the electoral boundaries of the several boroughs as defined by the act of the 2d. and 3d. of William IV.
- O'Donovan, John; Curry, Eugene (1839). "Parish of Disert". Ordnance Survey Letters.
- "Ruan Historical Background". Clare County Library.
- "Ruan Parish". Clare County Library.
- "Ruan Places of Interest". Clare County Library.
- Westropp, Thomas Johnson (1894). "Churches with Round Towers in Northern Clare". Journal of the Royal Society of Antiquaries of Ireland. XXIV.
