= Connolly, County Clare =

Village in County Clare, Ireland

Connolly Fíoch Rua
- Village
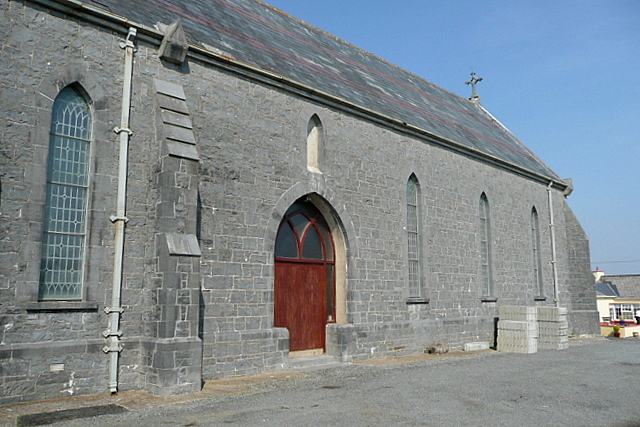
- Church of St. Michael the Archangel

- Location in Ireland
- Coordinates: 52°49′48.05″N 9°10′46.97″W
- Country: Ireland
- Province: Munster
- County: County Clare
- Time zone: UTC+0 (WET)
  - Summer (DST): UTC-1 (IST (WEST))

Connolly (Irish: Fíoch Rua) is a small village located in west County Clare, Ireland. It is 14 kilometres west south west of Ennis. The village is located on the R474 Ennis–Milltown Malbay road.

Amenities in the village include a post office, the Roman Catholic church, and national school (founded 1905), located in the centre of the village. Other amenities include a shop/petrol station, a pub and an art gallery. Connolly also formerly (in the 1940s) had a creamery and a Garda station.

== See also ==
- List of towns and villages in Ireland
