= R474 road (Ireland) =

Road in Ireland

Coordinates: 52.824130°N 9.040219°W

R474 road
- Bóthar R474
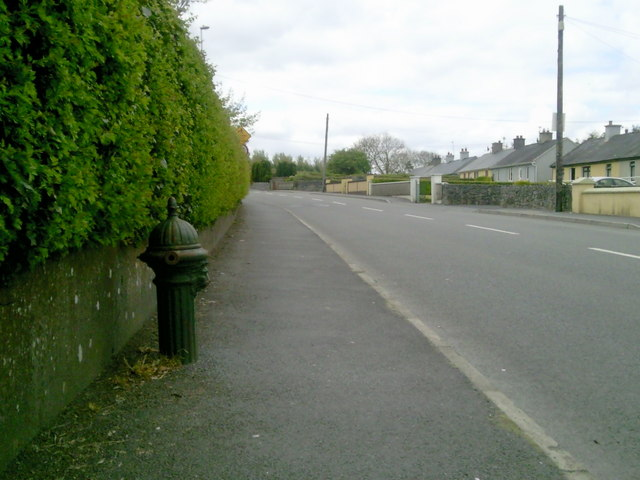
- Circular Road, Ennis, on the R474

Route information
- Length: 30.7 km (19.1 mi)

Major junctions
- From: N67 Milltown Malbay
- R460 Knockloskeraun; Crosses Annagh River and Caheraran River; Passes through Connolly and Kilmaley; N85 Ennis (Beechpark Roundabout)
- To: R458 Ennis (Mill Road)

Location
- Country: Ireland

Highway system
- Roads in Ireland; Motorways; Primary; Secondary; Regional

The R474 road is a regional road in Ireland, located in western County Clare.
