= Inagh =

Village in County Clare, Ireland

Inagh Eidhneach (Irish)
- Village
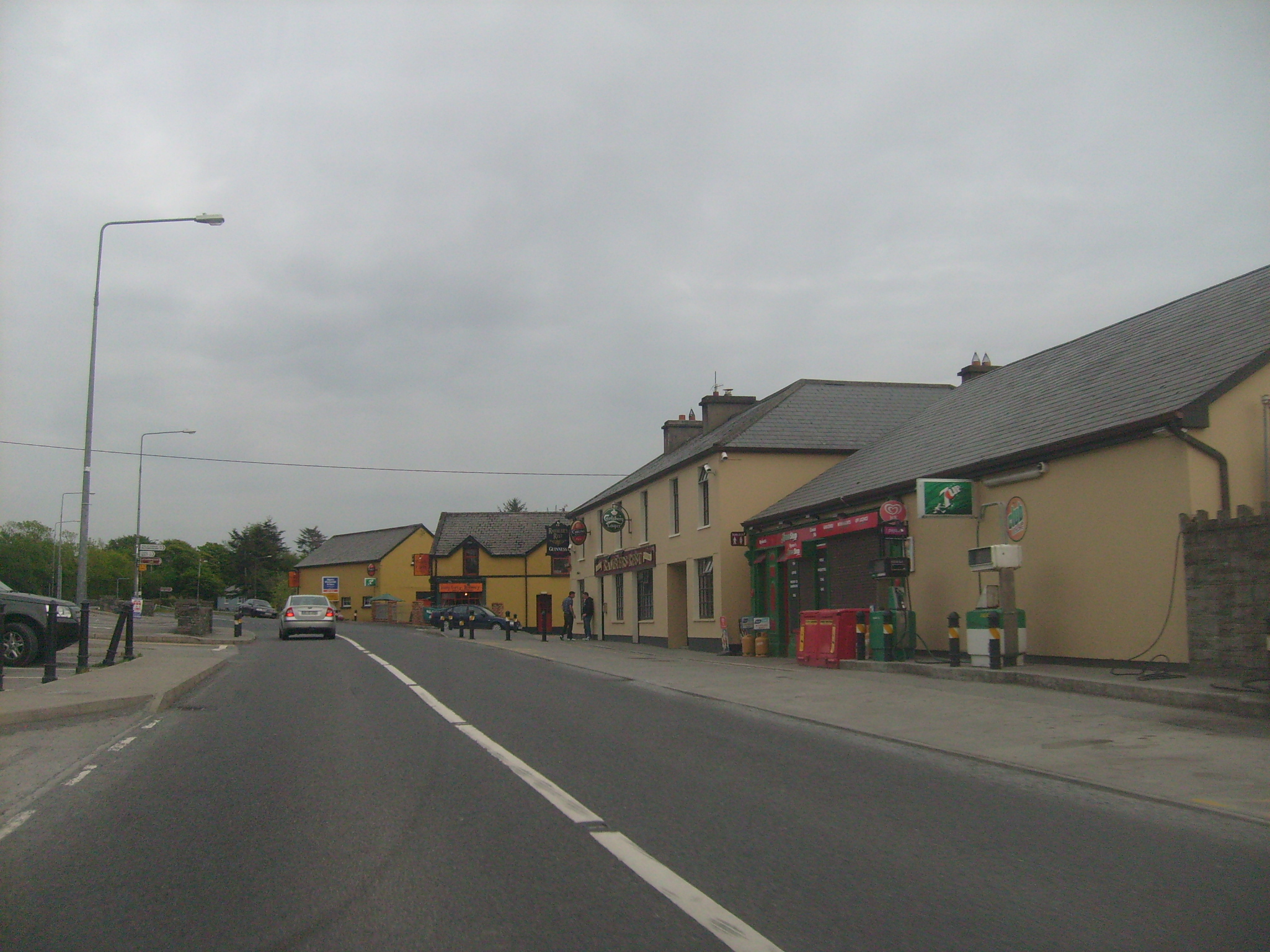
- Main Street

- Location in Ireland
- Coordinates: 52°52′30″N 9°10′30″W
- Country: Ireland
- Province: Munster
- County: County Clare

Population (2022)
  - Total: 228
- Time zone: UTC+0 (WET)
  - Summer (DST): UTC-1 (IST (WEST))
- Irish Grid Reference: R205813

Inagh (/ˈaɪnə/ EYE-nə; Irish: Eidhneach, meaning 'ivy') is a village and civil parish in County Clare, Ireland. It is situated 14 km west of Ennis on the Inagh River. The civil parish contains the villages of Inagh and Cloonanaha.

== Location ==
The parish is part of the barony of Inchiquin. The Parliamentary Gazetteer of Ireland, 1845 describes Inach (then including Kilnamona) as:

A parish in the barony of Inchiquin, 6 miles south-east by east of Ennistymon, County Clare, Munster. Length, 7 miles; breadth, 4½; area, 19,887 acres, 3 roods, 9 perches, of which 231 acres, 1 rood, 6 perches are water. Pop., in 1841, 4,192. Houses 690. The surface is, for the most part, a series of moors, bogs, and poor uplands; and its aspect is almost everywhere bleak and repulsive. Slievecallan, on the western boundary, has an altitude of 1,282 feet; and some heights in the interior have altitudes of very nearly 500 feet. The chief stream is the Brockagh. The roads from Ennistymon and Milltown-Malbay to Ennis traverse the interior. This parish is not recognised in the ecclesiastical divisions of the Established church; yet ranks as a Roman Catholic parish in the dio. of Killaloe, and has chapels at Inagh and Kilmanona.

== Village ==
The village is clustered around seven of the parish's townlands that lie north-east of Mount Callan. It was once called Breintir Fearmacach agus Cormacach, meaning "fetid district of Cinel Fearmaic and Cormaic". It was later called Breintre, then Inagh. The village is situated on the N85, Ennis - Ennistymon / Lahinch road, making Inagh a tourist route serving north and west Clare.

There are a number of community and sports groups in Inagh including a youth club, angling, walking, golfing, and reading clubs. Hurling and camogie are played at Inagh-Kilnamona GAA. Inagh has had a strong tradition of Irish music and dancing. Inagh is also home to the organic goat cheese farm of St Tola.

== Catholic Parish ==
The Catholic parish of Inagh and Kilnamona has its parish office in the village of Inagh.

The first church of Eidnach was said to have been built by Mac Creiche in his old age, around 580. Fragments of the "Teampul na glas aighne" remained in 1839, but were later demolished. The church at Inagh, called in Irish Teampul-duv-na-h’Eidhnighe, does not seem to have had a patron saint. The present church is dedicated to the "Immaculate Conception".

== Ruins ==
As of 1893 there was only one castle in the parish, Bothneil, which was very dilapidated. In 1580 the castle was the property of Teige, son of Murrough O'Brien. Near the castle is a stone named cloch-an-agraid, bearing an inscription in Ogham characters. According to Professor O'Looney of the Catholic University, who examined it in 1844 and 1859, the inscription reads: FAN LIA DO LICA CONAF (N) COLGAC COSOBADA (C), meaning "Under this stone is laid Conaf (n) the fierce [and] turbulent." Nearby there was a cromlech named altoir-na-Gretne (altar of the sun), where the local people once met on certain days each year.

== Townlands ==
The civil parish consists of the following townlands: Ballyduff Beg, Ballyduff More, Ballyea North, Ballyea South, Ballynoe, Bauntlieve, Boolavaun, Boolinrudda, Boolyduff, Boolynamiscaun, Carrowkeel East, Carrowkeel West, Cloonanaha, Cloonmackan, Cloontysmarra, Coolshingaun, Curraghodea, Derry, Derryharriv, Drumanure, Drumcarna, Drumcullaun, Drumduff, Drumlesh, Drumnagah, Formoyle Eighteragh East, Formoyle Eighteragh West, Formoyle Oughteragh East, Formoyle Oughteragh West, Garvillaun, Garvoghil, Glennageer, Gortalougha, Gortbofarna, Knockalassa, Knockogonnell, Kylea, Letterkelly, Maghera, Magherabaun, Meelick, Muckinish, Sileshaun West, Sileshaun East and Skaghvickincrow.

== Notable people ==
- Róisín Garvey (born 1973), Green Party senator.
- George Tottenham (1890–1977), first-class cricketer and Indian Civil Service official.
