= Irish round tower =

Irish mediaeval stone tower beside a church or monastery

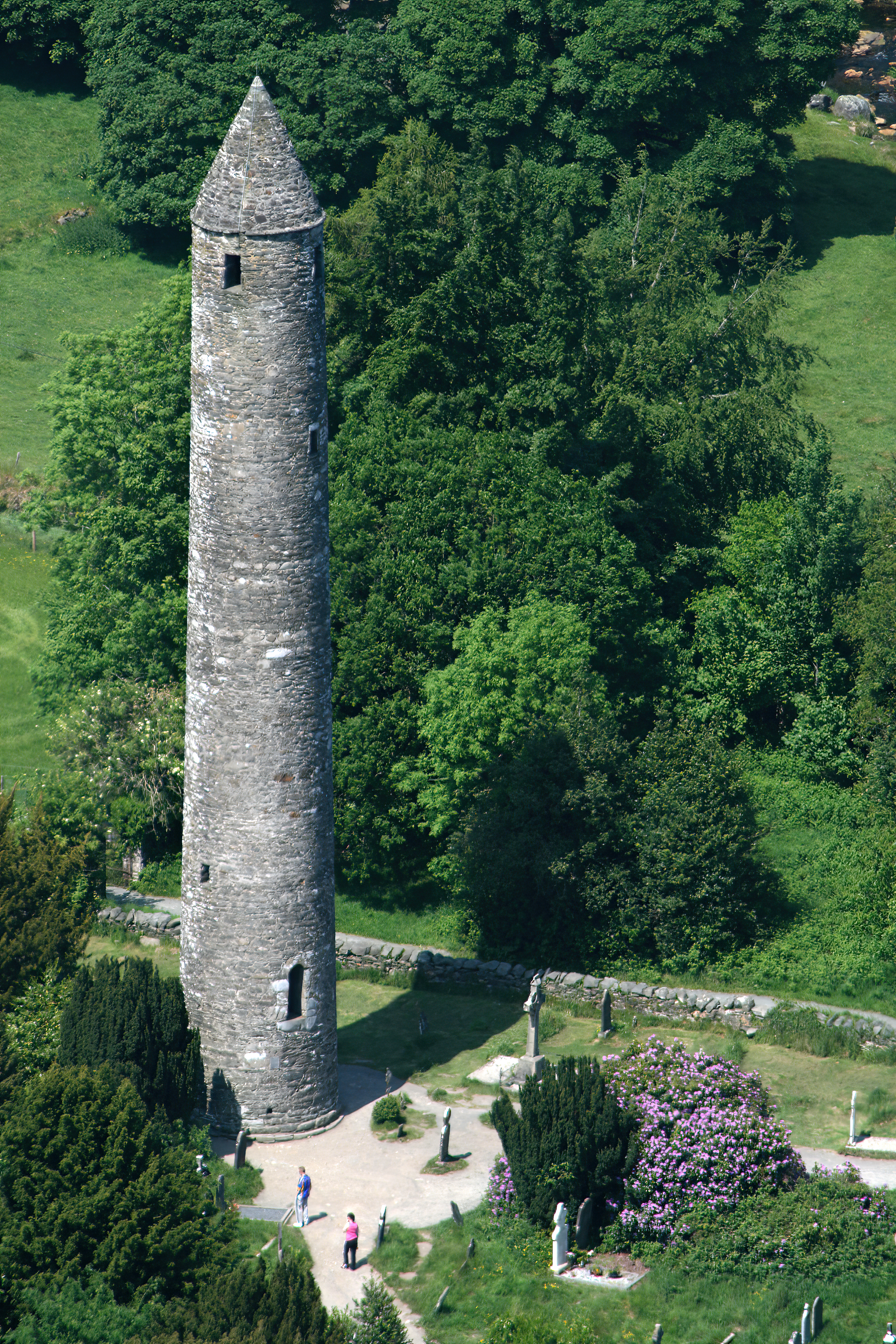
The round tower at Glendalough, Ireland, is approximately thirty metres tall.

Irish round towers (Irish: Cloigtheach (singular), Cloigthithe (plural); literally 'bell house') are early medieval stone towers of a type found mainly in Ireland, with two in Scotland and one on the Isle of Man. As their name Cloigtheach indicates, they were originally bell towers, though they may have been later used for additional purposes.

A tower of this kind is generally found in the vicinity of a church or monastery, with the door of the tower facing the west doorway of the church. Knowledge of this fact has made it possible, where towers still exist, to determine without excavation the approximate sites of lost churches that once stood nearby.

== Construction and distribution ==
Surviving towers range in height from 18 metres (60 ft) to c.35 metres (115 ft), and 12 metres (40 ft) to 18 metres (60 ft) in circumference; that at Kilmacduagh being the highest surviving in Ireland (and leaning 1.7 metres (5 ft 7 in) out of perpendicular). The masonry differs according to date, the earliest examples being uncut rubble, while the later ones are of neatly joined stonework (ashlar). The lower portion is solid masonry with a single door raised two to three metres above, often accessible only by a ladder. Within, in some, are two or more floors (or signs of where such floors existed), usually of wood sitting on internal off-sets or corbels, and it is thought that there were ladders in between. The windows in the drum, which are high up, are slits in the stone. The top or bell floor usually has (or had) four to eight windows, some of which (like at Tullaherin) were later additions. The cap (roof), is of stone, usually conical in shape, although some of the towers are now crowned by a later circle of battlements.

The main reason for the entrance-way being built above ground level was to maintain the structural integrity of the building rather than for defence. The towers were generally built with very little foundation. The tower at Monasterboice has an underground foundation of only sixty centimetres. Building the door at ground level would weaken the tower. The buildings still stand today because their round shape is gale-resistant and the section of the tower underneath the entrance is packed with soil and stones.

The doorway of the round tower usually faced the church on site.

The distance from the ground to the raised doorway is somewhat greater than that from the first floor to the second; thus large, rigid steps would be too large for the door. Excavations in the 1990s, revealing postholes, confirm that wooden steps were built. However, the use of ladders prior to the construction of such steps cannot be ruled out.

The Round Tower at Kinneigh has a unique hexagonal base.

The towers were probably built between the 10th and mid-13th centuries. In Ireland, about 120 examples are thought once to have existed; most are in ruins, while eighteen to twenty are almost perfect. There are three examples outside Ireland. Two are in eastern Scotland: the Brechin Round Tower and the Abernethy Round Tower, and the other is in Peel Castle on St. Patrick's Isle, now linked to the Isle of Man.

Some scholars dismiss round towers engaged to churches (St Kevin's Church in Glendalough, Ferns Abbey etc) as not being round towers, while others include them in their lists.

Famous examples are to be found at Devenish Island, and Glendalough, while that at Clondalkin is the only round tower in Ireland to still retain its original cap. With five towers each, County Mayo, County Kilkenny and County Kildare have the most. Mayo's round towers are at Aughagower, Balla, Killala, Meelick and Turlough, while Kildare's are located at Kildare Cathedral (which is 32 metres (105 ft) high), and also at Castledermot, Oughter Ard, Taghadoe (near Maynooth) and Old Kilcullen. The only known round tower with a hexagonal base is at Kinneigh in County Cork, built in 1014. The round tower at Ardmore, County Waterford, believed to be the latest built in Ireland (c. 12th century), has the unique feature of three string courses around the exterior.

== Purpose ==
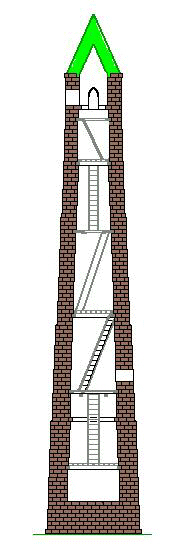
Cross-section of a round tower interior

It is likely that the primary reason for the round tower was—as the name cloigtheach indicates—to act as a belfry. The Irish word for round tower, cloigtheach, literally meaning bellhouse indicates this, as noted by George Petrie in 1845. The Irish language has greatly evolved over the last millennium. Dinneen notes the alternate pronunciations, cluiceach and cuilceach for cloigtheach. The closely pronounced cloichtheach means stone-house or stone-building. The round tower seems to be the only significant stone building in Ireland before the advent of the Normans in 1169–1171 CE.

University College Dublin Professor of Archaeology Tadhg O'Keeffe has suggested that the towers were originally high-status royal chapels, citing how two of them (Kells and Duleek) were scenes of regicide. He also suggested that the windows were arranged clockwise to imitate the order of relic-carrying procession from the elevated door to the very top.

Another possible purpose would be for taking shelter during raids. The mostly enclosed top floors and stone rooftops would make for terrible belltowers. The elevated doorway could have had a ladder that would be drawn up during raids, and the thick stone walls could withstand most attacks. Since the doors always face where a church stood, this also adds weight to the theory they were where monks would evacuate to. The oldest reference to a round tower (the one at Slane, see below) records its use as a refuge – however in this case it was burnt by the Vikings, killing everyone inside.

== List of Irish round towers ==
The following is a list of surviving Irish round towers, excluding modern reconstructions.

Picture	Location	County	Province	Condition	Height	Notes
	Aghadoe	Kerry	Munster	Incomplete	5.4 metres (18 ft)	
	Aghagower	Mayo	Connacht	Incomplete	16 metres (52 ft)	Second doorway inserted later at ground level
Round tower in Antrim, County Antrim	Antrim	Antrim	Ulster	Complete	28 m (92 ft)	Built around 10th century.Its main entrance is 2 m (6.6 ft) above the ground, suggesting that it was used as protection. The site of the monastery was burned down in 1147. It is locally known as The Steeple.
	Aghaviller	Kilkenny	Leinster	Incomplete	9.6 metres (31 ft)	Second doorway inserted later at ground level
	Ardmore	Waterford	Munster	Complete	30 metres (98 ft)	Has three string courses and a noticeable lean
	Ardpatrick	Limerick	Munster	Incomplete	3 metres (9.8 ft)	Barrow states that the Down Survey of 1655 marks the site with a tower of 3 stories with a broken top. Fitzgerald and McGreggor writing in 1826 state that it was a fine tower that "fell a few years since". A 3 m (9.8 ft) stump surrounded by rubble from its collapse is all that remains. Barrow speculates that some of the stones from the tower were used to build the nearby wall surrounding the cemetery, including one 1.07 m (3.5 ft) long with a raised moulding at the top of the entrance that may have been the sill stone from the tower's doorway.
	Ardrahan	Galway	Connacht	Incomplete	3 metres (9.8 ft)	
	Armoy	Antrim	Ulster	Incomplete	10.8 metres (35 ft)	
	Balla	Mayo	Connacht	Incomplete	10 metres (33 ft)	Second doorway inserted probably later at ground level
	Castledermot	Kildare	Leinster	Complete to cornice	20 metres (66 ft)	The conical cap has been replaced with battlements and the tower has been attached to a church (which was built later).
	Clondalkin	Dublin	Leinster	Complete	27.5 metres (90 ft)	Strengthened by a stone buttress, has a stone staircase to the doorway. It is the narrowest known tower with a base diameter of 4.04 m (13.3 ft)
	Clones	Monaghan	Ulster	Complete to cornice	22.9 metres (75 ft)	
	Clonmacnoise; O'Rourke's Tower; McCarthy's Tower	Offaly	Leinster	Incomplete; Complete	19.3 metres (63 ft); 17.7 metres (58 ft)	Two towers a short distance from each other O'Rourke: full height but capless; has 8 windows at top McCarthy: attached to a church
	Cloyne Round Tower; Cloyne	Cork	Munster	Complete to cornice	30.5 metres (100 ft)	The conical cap has been replaced with battlements.
	Derry	Londonderry	Ulster	Incomplete	5.5 metres (18 ft)	Barrow states that a tower known as "The Long Tower" once stood in the city of Derry at the site occupied since 1784–1786 by St Columba's Church, Long Tower The Long Tower was said to have survived the siege of 1689 but seemed to have disappeared. In 2018, the remains of the missing tower were identified in the grounds of Lumen Christi College, as a ruin previously believed to have been a windmill. The OS of County Londonderry of 1837 Has the following: "In the charter of Derry it is called Columb kille's Tower in Raven's plan of the city in 1621 it appears as a very high and slender belfry....In the popular traditions of Derry and its vicinity this tower is still invariably spoken of as a lofty round tower built by St Columb himself and many legends are current of its miracle working silver bell"
	Devenish I	Fermanagh	Ulster	Complete	25 metres (82 ft)	Climbable. Romanesque corbel heads below cap
Second Round Tower at Devenish Co. Fermanagh	Devenish II	Fermanagh	Ulster	Incomplete	0.5 metres (1 ft 8 in)	Foundation of tower directly adjacent to Devenish I
	Donaghmore	Meath	Leinster	Complete to cornice	26.6 metres (87 ft)	Full height but without cap
	Dromiskin	Louth	Leinster	Incomplete	15.25 metres (50.0 ft)	A conical cap was added to what remains of the tower.
	Drumbo	Down	Ulster	Incomplete	10.25 metres (33.6 ft)	
	Drumcliffe (near Ennis)	Clare	Munster	Incomplete	11 metres (36 ft)	
	Drumcliff (near Sligo)	Sligo	Connacht	Incomplete	9 metres (30 ft)	
	Drumlane	Cavan	Ulster	Incomplete	12 metres (39 ft)	Two indistinct carvings of birds can be identified 2 m (6.6 ft) up on the north side of the tower.
	Faughart	Louth	Leinster	Incomplete	0.05 metres (2.0 in)	Only a single circular course of large stones remain.
	Glendalough	Wicklow	Leinster	Complete	30.5 metres (100 ft)	Nearby Saint Kevin's Church includes a miniature round tower
Photo of the Irish Round Tower at Grangefertagh County Kilkenny	Grangefertagh	Kilkenny	Leinster	Complete to cornice	30 metres (98 ft)	Full height but without cap, located in the parish of Johnstown
	Inish Cealtra (in Lough Derg)	Clare	Munster	Incomplete	22.3 metres (73 ft)	
	Inishkeen	Monaghan	Ulster	Incomplete	12.6 metres (41 ft)	The top has been sealed with brick and cement.
	Kells	Meath	Leinster	Complete to cornice	26 metres (85 ft)	Full height but without cap
	Kilbennan	Galway	Connacht	Incomplete	16.5 metres (54 ft)	
Round Tower Kilcoona	Kilcoona	Galway	Connacht	Incomplete	3 metres (9.8 ft)	
Photo of Kildare Irish Round Tower in the town of Kildare, in the County of Kildare Ireland	Kildare	Kildare	Leinster	Complete to cornice	32 metres (105 ft)	Climbable; the conical cap has been replaced with battlements; Romanesque decoration around doorway
	Kilkenny	Kilkenny	Leinster	Complete to cornice	30 metres (98 ft)	Climbable; the conical cap has been replaced with battlements.
	Killala	Mayo	Connacht	Complete	25.5 metres (84 ft)	There is a noticeable bulge about halfway up the tower.
	Killashee	Kildare	Leinster	Incomplete	7.3 metres (24 ft)	Has a square base, only becoming round about halfway up. Incorporated into the fabric of a church.
Ireland Roundtower Killeany Aran Islands	Killeany/Aran Islands	Galway	Connacht	Incomplete	3.02 metres (9.9 ft)	
Photo of Kilmallock Irish Round Tower, County Limerick, Ireland	Kilmallock	Limerick	Munster	Incomplete	3 metres (9.8 ft)	Only the lower 3 m (9.8 ft) of the tower is original, what stands above (tower of the Collegiate church) is a late medieval addition/reconstruction.
Round Tower Killinaboy Co.Clare	Killinaboy	Clare	Munster	Incomplete	3.5 metres (11 ft)	
	Kilmacduagh	Galway	Connacht	Complete	34.5 metres (113 ft)	The tallest standing of the ancient round towers. It has 11 windows (more than any other tower) and the door is 8 m (26 ft) from the ground (higher than any other tower). Leans 1.02 m (3.3 ft) from the vertical.
	Kilree	Kilkenny	Leinster	Complete to cornice	27 metres (89 ft)	The conical cap has been replaced with battlements.
	Kinneigh	Cork	Munster	Complete to cornice	24.5 metres (80 ft)	Has a hexagonal base and a sealed top
Round Tower Liathmore	Liathmore	Tipperary	Munster	Incomplete	0.01 metres (0.39 in)	Discovered in 1969; only the 2.6 m (8.5 ft) foundations remain (unusually deep for an Irish round tower)
	Lusk	Dublin	Leinster	Complete to cornice	26.6 metres (87 ft)	Full height but without cap; is attached to a later-built church
	Maghera	Down	Ulster	Incomplete	5.4 metres (18 ft)	Stump with a large hole in the side
	Meelick	Mayo	Connacht	Incomplete	21 metres (69 ft)	
	Mollaneen (Dysert O'Dea Monastery)	Clare	Munster	Incomplete	15 metres (49 ft)	
I	Nendrum	Down	Ulster	Incomplete	4.4 metres (14 ft)	
	Dísert Óengusa, Croom	Limerick	Munster	Incomplete	21 metres (69 ft)	Romanesque decoration around doorway
	Monasterboice	Louth	Leinster	Incomplete	28 metres (92 ft)	
Photo of Old Kilcullen round tower, County Kildare, Ireland	Old Kilcullen	Kildare	Leinster	Incomplete	11 metres (36 ft)	
Round Tower Oran	Oran	Roscommon	Connacht	Incomplete	3.9 metres (13 ft)	Largest base diameter of any known original Irish round tower at 6 m (20 ft)
Photo of Oughterard Irish Round Tower, County Kildare, Ireland	Oughter Ard	Kildare	Leinster	Incomplete	9.5 metres (31 ft)	
Round Tower Ram's Island	Ram's Island	Antrim	Ulster	Incomplete	12.8 metres (42 ft)	
The remains of the round tower	Rathmichael	Dublin	Leinster	incomplete	1.9 metres (6 ft 3 in)	Said to have been used to place bodies after being buried in the graveyard for a number of years.
	Rattoo	Kerry	Munster	Complete	27.4 m	Includes a Sheela na Gig
Photo of Roscam Irish Round Tower County Galway Ireland	Roscam	Galway	Connacht	Incomplete	10.98 metres (36.0 ft)	7 levels of putlog holes clearly visible
	Roscrea	Tipperary	Munster	Incomplete	20 metres (66 ft)	
	Scattery Island	Clare	Munster	Complete to cornice, with a partially truncated cap	26 metres (85 ft)	Doorway is at ground level
	Seir Kieran	Offaly	Leinster	Incomplete	2.6 metres (8 ft 6 in)	
	St Mullin's	Carlow	Leinster	Incomplete	1 metre (3 ft 3 in)	
	St Patrick's Rock (near Cashel)	Tipperary	Munster	Complete	28 metres (92 ft)	Attached to a later-built church
	Steeple (near Antrim)	Antrim	Ulster	Complete	28 metres (92 ft)	
	Swords	Dublin	Leinster	Complete	26 metres (85 ft)	Has a deformed top floor, which is topped by a stone cross
Photo of Taghadoe Irish Round Tower County Kildare, Ireland	Taghadoe	Kildare	Leinster	Incomplete	19.8 metres (65 ft)	
	Timahoe	Laois	Leinster	Complete	29 metres (95 ft)	Romanesque decoration around doorway
	Tory Island	Donegal	Ulster	Incomplete	12.8 metres (42 ft)	
	Tullaherin	Kilkenny	Leinster	Incomplete	22.5 metres (74 ft)	
	Turlough Abbey	Mayo	Connacht	Complete	22.9 metres (75 ft)	

Source: roundtowers.org

== List of missing towers ==
This is a list of Irish round towers known to have existed, but no trace now remains.

Name	County	Year	Notes: taken from George Lennox Barrow's The Round Towers of Ireland 1979 and Brian Lalor's The Irish Round Tower-Origins and Architecture Explored 1999 unless otherwise stated
Annadown	Galway	1238	Lalor states that there is a reference from The Annals of the Four Masters for the year 1238 "The Cloicteach of Enachduin was erected". All trace of the tower has vanished
Ardbraccon	Meath	1181	The Annals of Clonmacnoise for the year 1181 record "The steeple of Ardbreakean fell this yeare". No trace of the tower now remains.
Ardfert	Kerry	1771	The tower fell in a great storm in 1771. Descriptions of the tower vary with Samual Molyneux passing the tower in 1709 stating that it was "very low" with seamen often mistaking it for Scattery round tower. Charles Smith in 1756 describes the tower as being near 100 ft (30m) tall being mostly constructed of "a dark kind of marble" and "not composed of freestone", "the finest [tower] I have met with". Later accounts in 1878 (O Halloran) and 1884 (Tralee Chronicle) put its height at 120 ft and 150 ft respectively. The Parliamentary Gazetteer of Ireland 1846 states that the tower was "slated" (but being written over 70 years after it fell it is difficult to say for certain if this was so, if it was it would certainly be a unique feature). Brain Lalor states that fragments of the tower have been found on-site and its location is marked on OSI maps from c. 1850.
Armagh	Armagh	1121	There are several references to this tower from the annals: 995/6 "Ard-Macha was burned by lightning, both houses damhlaig and cloigteach and fidnad" – Annals of Tigernach; 1020 "Ard-Macha was burned with all the fort....and the Cloicteach, with its bells" – Annals of the Four Masters; 1121 "A great wind storm happened in December of this year, which knocked off the conical cap of the cloicteach of Ard-Macha"- Annals of the Four Masters; The tower is said to have stood 12 m north of the present cathedral (based on a map drawn in 1886 during the restoration of the cathedral) and possibly finally met its demise in 1642 when the town and cathedral were burned by Phelim O'Neill; No trace of the tower remains.
Brigown (near Mitchelstown)	Cork	1720	Barrow's research indicates that this tower collapsed in a storm in 1720, and the remaining stump (around 4.6 m tall) disappeared by degrees with the last dug out in 1807 and the stones used to build a local glebe house. The tower reputably stood around 18 m to the south-west of the ruined church. No trace of the tower remains.
Clonard	Meath	1039	The Annals of the Four Masters for the year 1039 records "The Cloicteach of Cluain-Iraid fell" This is the only known reference to the tower and no trace of it now remains.
Cork	Cork	1738	Barrow's evidence indicates that this tower fell in 1738. A French traveller, Boullaye le Gouz passing it in 1644 describes the tower as "dix ou douze pas de circuit et plus de 100 pieds du hait" (10 or 12 paces around and over 100 feet tall). An engraving on the foot of a monstrance (dating from 1669) in the Dominican friary at Pope's Quay, Cork depicts St. Finbar with a church behind him and a capless round tower at one end. The tower has a broken top with 6 windows directly in line above a round-headed doorway. No trace of the tower now remains and the cathedral built in 1865 evidently covers the site where it once stood.
Downpatrick	Down	1015	The Annals of the Four Masters for the year 1015 record "Dun-de-leathghlas was totally burned with its Daimhlaig and its Cloicteach by lightning" Harris (from Ware's Antiquities 1746) in 1744 describes the remains of the tower at that time as being 66 feet tall with walls 3 feet thick standing 40 ft from the old cathedral. The doorway was at ground level. (Barrow speculates that the ground level may have been raised by the rubble of the old cathedral.) A painting by Charles Lilly from 1790 and a print from 1789 show the round tower with a broken top standing to the south-west corner of the cathedral next to St. Patrick's grave. The remainder of the tower is said to have been pulled down in the early 19th century during the renovation of the cathedral as it was in a dangerous state. No trace of the tower now remains but the site is pointed out next St Patrick's grave on raised ground which Barrow speculates may conceal its foundations.
Dublin, Church of St Michael le Pole	Dublin	1775	The tower stood in an old churchyard just south-west of Dublin castle. In 1706 the Dean of St. Patrick's Cathedral granted the ruins of the church (where the tower stood) to Dr. John Jones to build a school, with one of the conditions being that he would not pull down the tower. The formerly free-standing tower then had the school built around it. Drawings by Beringer from 1766 and 1776 show this school building with the tower projecting through the west end of the roof. in 1775 the tower was badly damaged by a storm and the Dean and Chapter agreed that it must be taken down because it was too dangerous to repair. This was done 3 years later with the upper portion of the tower removed down to the level of the church roof. It is unclear when the remainder of the tower was demolished, though this was possibly done in 1789. Barrow states that Petrie in his notes (c. 1830s) quotes old locals describing the tower as of rude construction of large stones c.70 ft high with two windows at the top. A car park now marks the site of the former school and no trace of the tower now remains, though its stones are said to have been used in a nearby cemetery wall (this wall is no longer present).
Duleek	Meath	1147	The Annals of the Four Masters for the year 1147 record "A thunderbolt fell this year upon the cloicteach of Daimhliag-Chianain and knocked off the beannchobhair (conical cap)" The tower survived at least until medieval times. Evidence of this is clearly visible in the imprint of the tower in the north wall of the square 15th century Tower of St. Mary's Church. The tower was incorporated into the medieval belfry in a similar manner to the Irish Round Tower at Lusk. The tower collapsed or was demolished at an unknown date leaving a scar on the side of the belfry. The scar rises to 14 m high where the tower diverged from the later building. There is a large window/opening (9.6 m from the ground) within this scar suggesting that this opening allowed access between the tower and belfry. Fragments of the foundation remain showing that the external diameter at the base of the tower was 5.18 m.
Emly	Tipperary	1058	The Annals of the Four Masters for the year 1058 record "Iarleach-Ibhair was totally burned Daimhliag and Cloicteach" Thomas Dineley in his book from 1681 has a sketch of the old cathedral at Emly with a stump (possibly that of the remains of a round tower) behind it at one side reaching to the height of the eaves of the cathedral. The stump appears to have 11 regular even courses of masonry with an opening, possibly representing the doorway. The site of the cathedral is an old graveyard beside the modern catholic church. All that remains of the cathedral is an old stone cross and no trace of the tower remains.
Kilbarry	Roscommon	1770s	John O'Donovan speaks of meeting a local man in 1837 who remembers the round tower of Kilbarry standing. It is said to have stood around 15 feet west of the church in the monastery of Clooncoirpthe. The tower fell in a great storm in the 1770s, and in doing so knocked down the closest corner of the church. This corner was known as Claig-theach corner. The tower had a diameter of 9–11 feet and the last remains of it were removed 6 years before O'Donovan's visit. Barrow visiting the site in 1974 describes finding several stones taken from the ruin of the round tower embedded in the cemetery wall surrounding the site and also scattered amongst the graves. These stones include the capstone, a conical stone with an angle of around 65 degrees 30 cm high with one side broken off. Also found were what Barrow believes were the remains of a round-headed doorway "of three stones" dressed to the curve with a moulding.
Kellistown	Carlow	1807	Anthologia Hibernica Volume 4 (1794) (which refers to the place as "Kellet's Town") states "The tower which stands on elevated ground about five miles NE of Carlow and not on the Barrow as asserted in some late publications is built of gritstone with which the country abounds and about twelve feet internal diameter but at present much destroyed" A sketch of the ruin of this tower is also in this book. It depicts the tower standing about 10m tall with 23 stone courses, broken down its left side to ground level, with a breach near the top which could represent the remains of a window. A Topographical Dictionary of Ireland states "One of the ancient round towers stood here till 1807 when it was pulled down to make room for the belfry of the church".
Killeshin	Laois	1703	The monastic site at Killeshin, 5 km west of Carlow, contains the remains of a 12th-century church. The round tower is said to have stood 20 m south-west of this church. The Royal Society of Antiquaries of Ireland describes the steeple of Killeshin being "undermined" "and flung down" in 1703 by an employee of a Captain Woosley (described as "Hero of the Boyne"). The tower measured 105 feet long on the ground after being felled and apparently remained largely intact in its tubular form. John O'Donovan was told by locals in 1838 that the tower was knocked down by the local landlord in c. 1750 as it posed a threat (if it fell) to his cattle who used to scratch themselves on the four pillars on which the tower stood. Barrow speculates that this later account of the towers destruction and 4 pillars notion is a corruption of the original account and speculates that the tower had become dilapidated at its base and so became structurally unsound. Stones from the tower were still visible on site during O'Donovan's visit in 1838. Barrow states that nothing now remains of the tower, "at least above the ground". Round Tower, St. Mochta’s Monastery, Louth Village, County Louth. This tower collapsed during a great storm of 968AD, tower collapse recorded in the Annals of Clonmacnoise. Ordnance survey maps of 19th century mark site of round tower.
Raphoe	Donegal	1660	In James Moore's 1739 book Ware states that "There was also in that Place a round Tower built on a Hill in which the Bishops of Raphoe formerly kept their Studies". Barrow states that there is a manuscript in the Ware's handwriting dated 2 April 1660, that Dr. John Leslie, bishop of Raphoe, had told him that he caused a round tower, or pyramid build of old times to be pulled down and the stones used for his new "epall house". In the bottom of the tower, he found the bones of a man buried anciently there. Barrow states that the "Bishop's House", now a burnt-out ruin, was built by Leslie in 1637. The traditional site of the tower is now pointed up a lane to the north-west of the cathedral. Barrow speculates that a farm wall nearby may contain stones from the round tower.
Rath Blamaic	Clare	1838	A ruined medieval church marks the site of the monastery said to be founded by St. Blamaic in the 6th century. It is a mile NNW of the round tower at Dysert O Dea which is clearly visible across the valley. Keane says: The ruins of a Round Tower to the height of eight feet and without door or window are said to have stood at Rath until the year 1838 when the materials were removed for the building of the Churchyard wall . Keane also says There is a legend among the peasantry of the neighbourhood that the Saint of Dysart, St Mawnaula, carried away from Rath the tower now standing at Dysart whereupon Blamaic the Saint of Rath retaliated by conveying to Rath some other building which had stood at Dysart. Barrow speculates that it is more likely that the tower and indeed the entire monastery at Dysart was built to replace the one that had been ruined at Rath Blamaic. Barrow also states that when he examined the cemetery wall, in 1974, at Rath Blamaic that many of its stones looked likely to have come from the remains of the round tower.
Rosscarbery	Cork	1285	The Annals of Inisfallen for the year 1285 record A very destructive wind this year, about the feast of Brigid [Feb 1st]; It blew down the bell tower of Ross Ailithir and caused much damage generally. Barrow states that the Silver seal of the dean and chapter of Ross, made in 1661, was embossed with a round tower which had a bulge at its base like Clondalkin. The site at Rosscarbery is now marked by a Church of Ireland cathedral with the remains of an early church across the road. No trace of the round tower remains.
Rosscommon	Roscommon	date not known	Descriptions of St. Coman's monastery at the time of dissolution of the monastarys include reference to a round tower. The map prepared by Nicholas Malby of 1581 shows the tower as having reduced height with a temporary conical roof. Images on the Essex estates prepared by Mr. Plunkett in 1736 show tower in ruins. The present St Coman's church is said to be located on the site of the original monastic church. The round tower is said to have stood at the back of the town Gaol. No trace of the round tower remains.
Slane	Meath	948	The Annals of the Four Masters for the year 948 record The Belfry of Slane was burned by the foreigners [The Danes], with its full of relics and distinguished persons. together with Caeineachair, Lector of Slaine, and the crosier of the patron saint and a bell, the best of bells (this is the earliest reference in the known Annals to an Irish round tower). Barrow speculates that the probable site of the tower was on a hill where the ruins of a 16th-century friary now remain. No trace of the tower remains.
Tomregon	Cavan		The site of at Tomregon is located around 4 km south-west of Ballyconnell in an open field known as the Church Meadow. Traces of the foundations of the tower and church were reported in 1948. Davies claims that a stone on the site carved with a human head, legs, arms but no body, looks like it came from an arch from the tower. Barrow discounts this possibility as the arch stone would be too small for such purpose but may have come from the ruined church. Nothing visible remains above ground at least.
Trim	Meath	1126–7	The Annals of Ulster for the year 1126–7 record A great hosting by Connor MacFergall O'Loughlinn together with the people of the North of Ireland, to Meath; They burned Trim, both cloicteach and church and these full of people. It is presumed by locals that the tower stood on the site of the Church of Ireland cathedral. No other references to the tower exist and no trace of the tower remains.
Tuamgraney	Clare	964	The Annals of Chronicum Scotorum for the year 964 record Cormac Ua Cillin, of the Ui Fiachrach Aidhne, comarb of Ciaran and Coman, and comarb of Tuaim-greine, by whom the great church of Tuam-greine, and its cloicteach, were constructed, sapiens et senex, et Episcopus, quievit in Christo. This is the earliest reference in the known annals to the building of an Irish round tower. George Petrie recorded a local tradition that some of the tower remained until as late as 1800. Barrow states that Brash, however, upon visiting the area in 1852 and speaking with its oldest inhabitants was unable to find anyone with knowledge of the tower. Brash speculates that the Petrie may have been referencing an old stone church rather that the remains of a round tower. It is unknown where exactly the tower stood and no trace of it remains.
Tullaghard	Meath	1171	The Annals of Four Masters for the year 1171 record The cloicteach of Tealach-aird was burned by Tighearnan Ua Ruairc, with its full of people in it. John O'Donovan identifies the site as in the townland of Tullaghard of Steeplestown a short way due North of Trim. O'Donovan also records speaking to a local person born in 1750 who claimed to remember the tower standing as late as 1757. He had seen it as a child but was unable to recall what kind of tower it was. Barrow states that the site is now "open fields" and no trace of the tower remains.
Tullamaine	Kilkenny	1121	The Annals of Four Masters for the year 1121 record The cloicteach of Tealach-nInmainne in Osraighe was split by a thunderbolt and a stone flew from the cloicteach, which killed a student in the church. John O'Donovan identifies the site as Tullamaine, a parish whose overgrown closed cemetery is in a field about 4 km West of Callan. No monastic remains now exist there and no trace of the tower remains.

== Towers outside Ireland ==
This is a list of Irish round towers built contemporary with the originals outside of Ireland

Picture	Name	Location	Height	Notes: taken from George Lennox Barrow's The Round Towers of Ireland 1979
	Abernethy Round Tower	Perthshire Scotland	22.05 metres	Complete to cornice, the tower currently has a wooden platform sheeted with lead as a roof.
	Brechin Cathedral Round Tower	Angus Scotland	31.98 meters	The tower is complete with an octagonal spirelet roof built on in the 14th century or later. The iron weather vane on top the roof increases the height of the tower to 33.05m
	Peel Castle Round Tower	Isle of Man	13.7 metres	The Tower is complete with a castellated top and was evidently used in later times as a lookout tower

There is also a replica tower located in Milford, Massachusetts. Located in St. Mary's cemetery, the tower was dedicated on July 10th, 1896. It is widely recognized as the only Irish round tower in North America.

== See also ==
- Broch
- Chaine Memorial, a relatively modern tower lighthouse at Larne, in the style of a round tower.
- Pele tower
- Rock of Cashel
- List of modern Irish round towers (post-medieval towers)

== Sources ==
- Lalor, Brian (1999), The Irish Round Tower: Origins and Architecture Explored, ISBN 1-898256-64-0
- Stalley, Roger (2000), Irish Round Towers, The Irish Treasures, Town House Trinity House, ISBN 9781860591143
- O'Keeffe, T. (2004), Ireland's Round Towers. Building, Rituals and Landscapes of the Early Irish Church, Stroud, Gloucestershire: Tempus, ISBN 9780752425719
- Barrow, George L. (1979). The Round Towers of Ireland: A Study and Gazette. University Press of Ireland. ISBN 9780906187449.
- Petrie, George (1845), The Ecclesiastical Architecture of Ireland: An Essay on the Origins of Round Towers in Ireland, Dublin: Hodges and Smith
