= Meelick =

Meelick may refer to the following places in the West of Ireland:

- Meelick, County Clare
- Meelick, County Mayo
- Meelick, County Galway
