= List of modern Irish round towers =

This article lists post-medieval replicas and homages to original monastic Irish round towers.

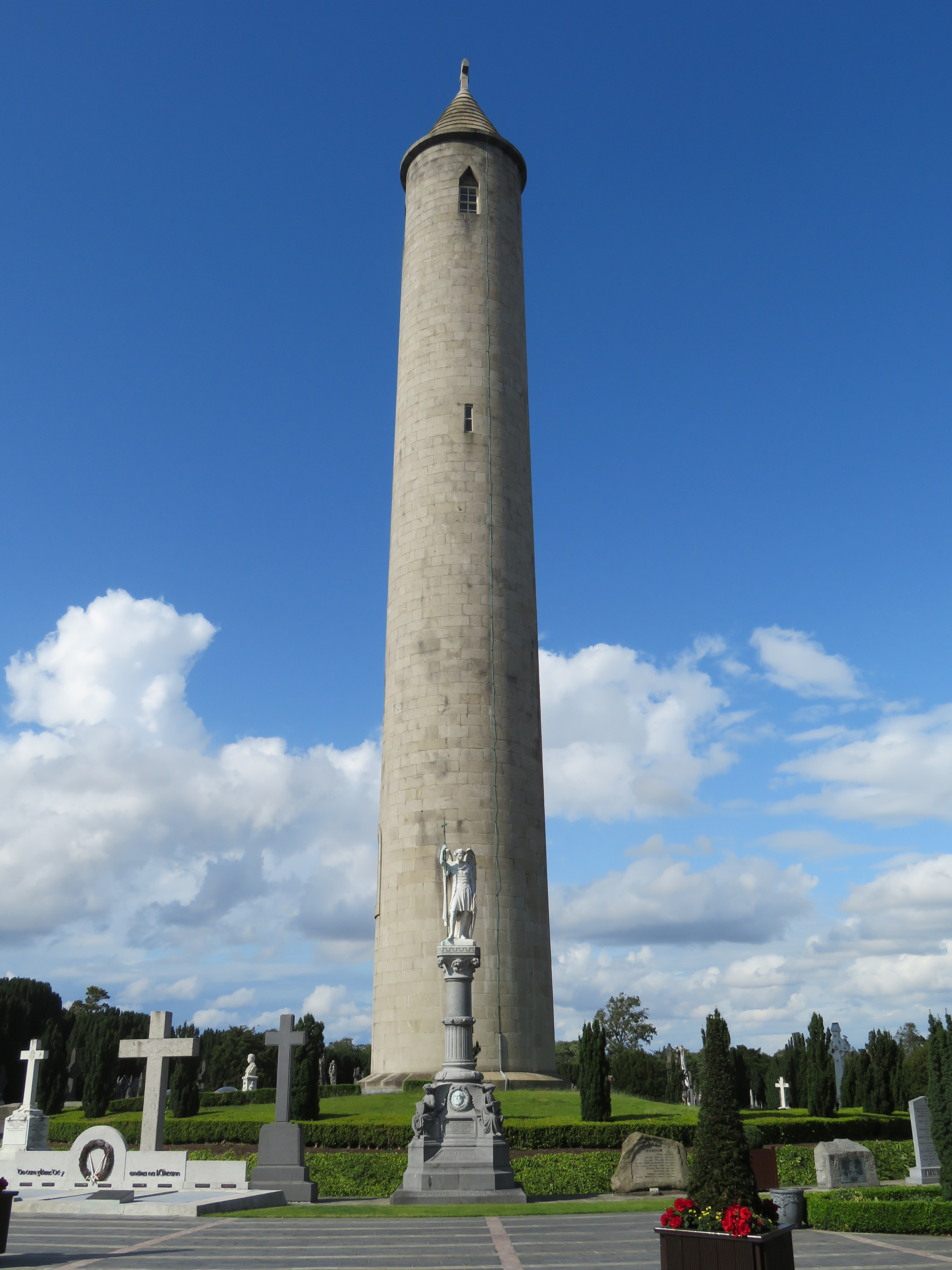
Daniel O'Connell's tower at Glasnevin Cemetery

== In Ireland ==
- O' Connell Tower in Glasnevin Cemetery is a 55m tall tower built in 1855 dedicated to the memory of Daniel O'Connell Location: 53.370198°N 6.277156°W
- The Crimean Monument Tower in the Irish National Heritage Park, Ferrycarrig, County Wexford is a tower built in 1857 dedicated to the Irish soldiers who fought in the Crimea War. It is 24.5m tall. Location: 52.350884°N 6.512555°W
- The Chaine Memorial in Larne, County Antrim is a ~27m tall Irish style round tower built in 1888 dedicated to James Chaine. It has been used as a lighthouse since 1899 Location:54.854496707319036°N 5.797945703177143°W
- Adjacent to St. Mary's church, Ballygibbon, County Cork, the Waterloo Round Tower is an architectural folly bell tower that was built in the 1840s to resemble a mediaeval round tower. The Tower is 80 feet high and took 9 years to build (1836–45) Location: 51.95498°N 08.57451°E
- In the grounds of St. Patricks Church, Whitechurch, County Cork, is a freestanding round tower belfry built in c1834 Location: 51.98267424716835°N 8.51472724361552°W
- The Liam Lynch Monument is an 18m tall tower, built in 1935, in the Knockmealdown Mountains, County Tipperary in memory of Liam Lynch (Irish republican) Location: 52.251795°N 7.857344°W
- The site of the former Ulster History Park in Gortin near Omagh in County Tyrone has a replica of a round tower. It is now owned by the Glenpark Estate. It was designed by McCormick Tracey Mullarkey Architects. The tower, which was part of a monastic site built within the theme park, was based on the 25m tower at Devenish Island, County Fermanagh Location: 54.683804°N 7.258529°W
- St Patrick's Church of Ireland church in Saul, County Down was rebuilt in 1932 to commemorate the 1500th anniversary of the arrival of St. Patrick in Ireland. It has an attached round tower Location: 54.34342254738292°N 5.67916026536656°W
- St Patricks Church (Church of Ireland) in Jordanstown Co. Antrim has an attached round tower. It was built in 1868 and is 73 feet high Location: 54.68893623706977°N 5.898131339830883°W
- The Church of Saints Joseph & Conal, Bruckless, County Donegal, has a round tower built in c1860 to serve as a bell tower. Location: 54.6412779179263°N 8.390046986466874°W
- Coolcarrigan Church of Ireland, County Kildare, is small church with an attached round tower built in 1885 Location:53.3210955744697°N 6.843723711860166°W
- In the Poisoned Valley, County Donegal lies the Sacred Heart Catholic Church of Dunlewey. It was built in 1878 and has an attached round tower as its belfry Location: 55.03179552511961°N 8.148317918996774°W
- St Eunans Catholic Church, Raphoe, County Donegal, is a church built in 1878 with an attached round tower belfry Location: 54.871888787046764°N 7.604987482914131°W
- The Church of the Nativity of Our Lady, Timoleague, County Cork, is a Hiberno-Romanesque revival building that had a round tower belfry added to its eastern side in 1931 Location: 51.64514978967315°N 8.766485646161886°W

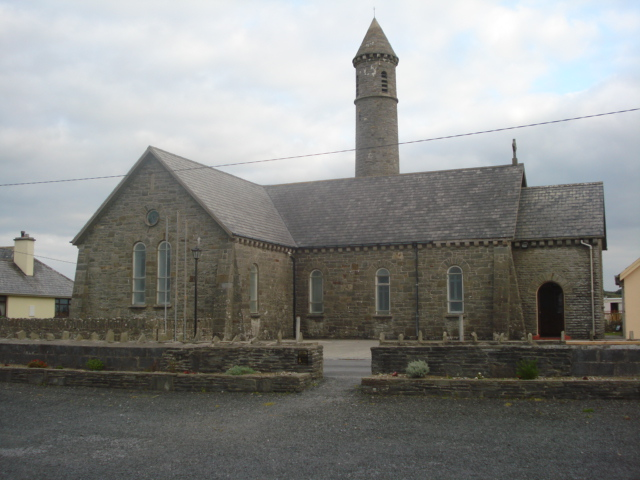
The Star of the Sea Church in Quilty, County Clare

- Our Lady Star of the Sea Church at Quilty, County Clare built in 1909, is a T-plan Hiberno-Romanesque style with a round tower, built to commemorate the wreck of the French vessel Leon XIII and the rescue of its crew by local fisherman in 1907. It was designed by architect Mr. Joseph O’ Malley B.E. of Limerick Location:52.814916°N 9.461276°W
- Belview Tower is a folly built in 1817 in the former estate of Belview House, Kilclare, County Offaly It currently reaches a height of around 11m Location:53.338945°N 7.549414°W
- St Josephs Church Dunloy, County Antrim, has freestanding 25m belfry in the form of an Irish round tower built in c1994 Location:55.009048°N 6.411462°W
- Evans Tower in Portrane, County Dublin is a 100ft tall tower built in 1844 as a memorial to George Hampden Evans, a former Irish politician. Location: 53.487407590781096°N 6.107183227526288°W
- St Marys Church in Moore, County Roscommon had an Irish style round tower belfry added in c1910 It is 85ft high Location: 53.3380535698594°N 8.093773269670164°W
- St Marks Church of Ireland, Borris-in-Ossory, County Laois was built in 1869 and has a round tower belfry Location: 52.938676569649786°N 7.636339733023115°W
- De la Poer tower in Clonegam, County Waterford is a 70ft tall incomplete Irish style round tower built in 1785 52.30690590768644°N 7.347175894478303°W
- St Oliver Plunkett Church in Haggardstown, County Louth is flanked by a Celtic style round tower in its north east corner. It was completed in 1924 Location: 53.96623567632333°N 6.363698494093987°W
- The Kelly Round Tower is a funerary monument in Killeroran graveyard, near Ballygar, Co Galway. The Monument is 7.6m in circumference at the base and reaches a height of around 15m Location: 53.512830584901586°N 8.313724135797036°W

== Outside Ireland ==
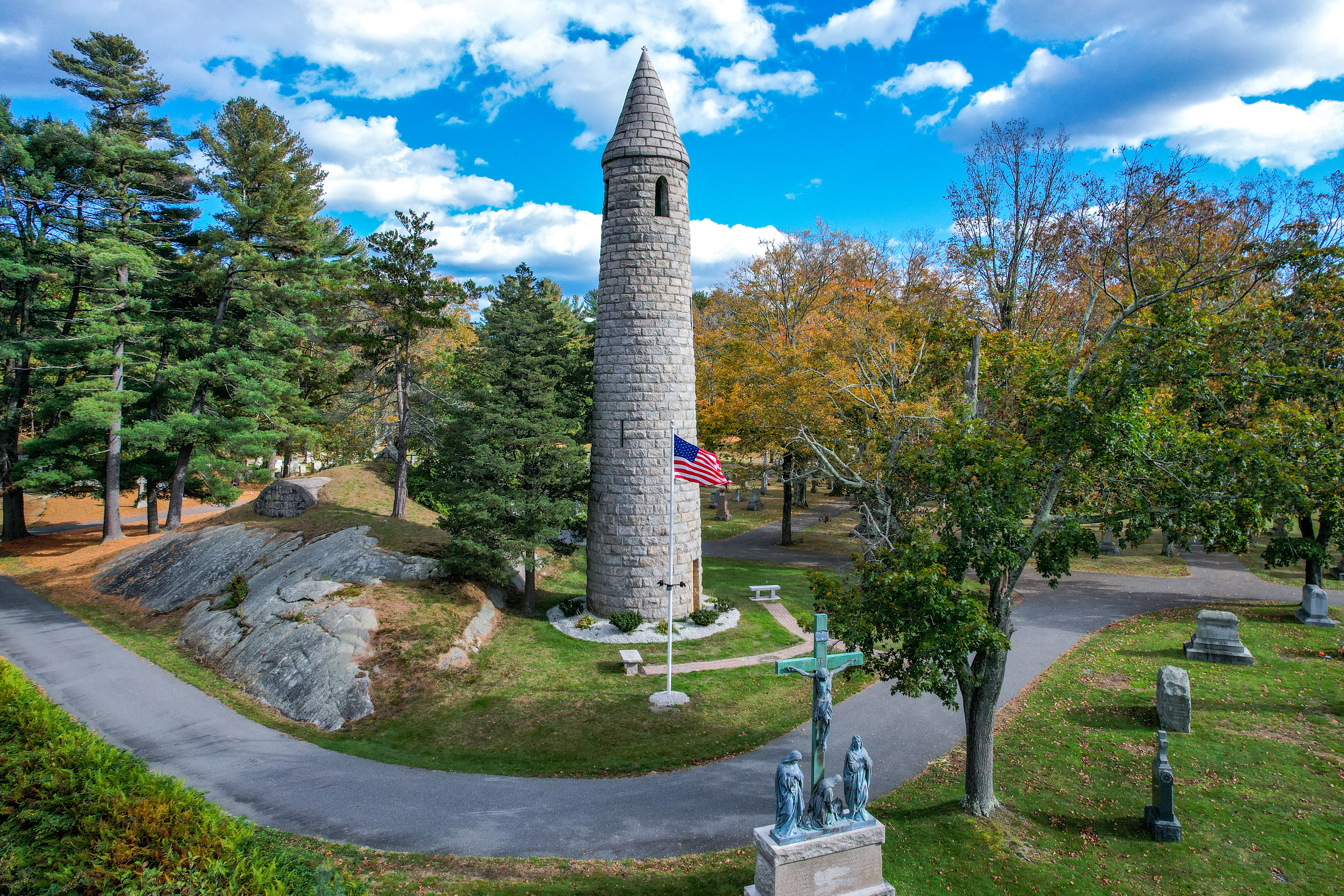
Tower at Milford, Massachusetts
