= George Barrow =

George Barrow may refer to:

- George Barrow (geologist) (1853–1932), British geologist
- Sir George Barrow, 2nd Baronet (1806–1876), English civil servant
- George Barrow (Indian Army officer) (1864–1959), British general
- George Barrow (musician) (1921–2013), American jazz saxophonist
- George Lennox Barrow (1921–1989), Irish historian and colonial administrator
- George L. Barrow (1851–1925), Australian journalist

== See also ==
- George Barrows (1914–1994), American actor
- George Barrows (politician) (1822–1904), American politician from Maine
