= Mo Chua of Balla =

Saint Cronan Mo Chua
- Born: 6th century Ireland
- Died: 30 March 637; Ireland
- Venerated in: Roman Catholicism
- Feast: 30 March

Mo Chua or Crónán mac Bécáin, also called Claunus, Cuan, Mochua, Moncan and Moncain (died 30 March 637) was a legendary Irish saint who founded the monastery in Balla.

== Life ==
Mo Chua was the youngest of the three sons of Becan (supposedly descended from Lugaid mac Con) and Cumne (daughter of Conamail of the Dál mBuinne). His hair fell out in patches, and he worked as a shepherd. Comgall of Bangor happening to visit Becan's house, and finding Mo Chua neglected by the family, took him with him to Bangor Abbey to educate him.

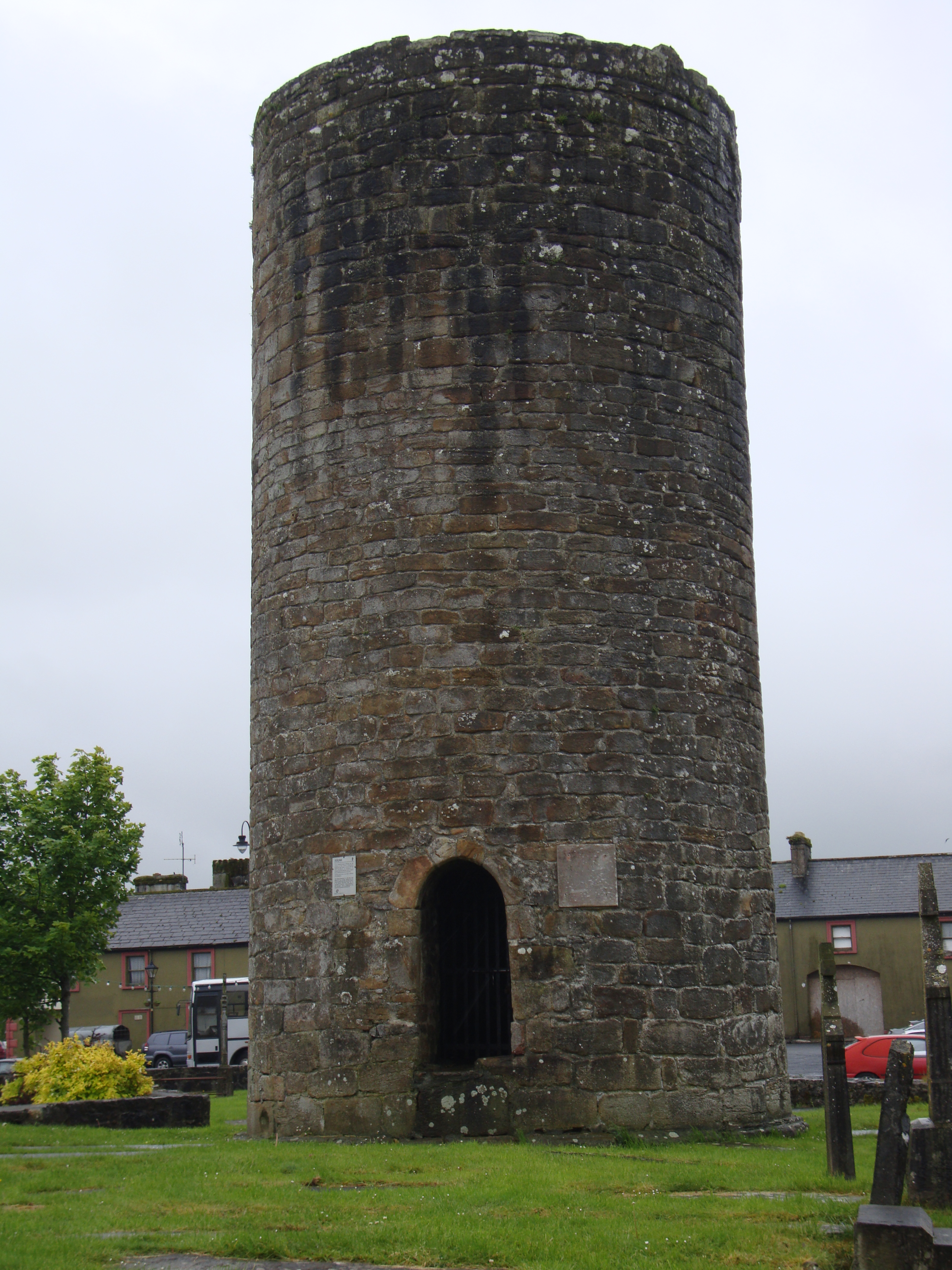
Balla Round Tower

After growing to adulthood at Bangor Abbey, Mo Chua was eventually expelled, like many other Irish monks who shared his opinions, for being a "Romanist" who opposed the degree to which the monasteries and clergy of the Celtic Church had been absorbed into the Irish clan system and lost their independence from control by local lay rulers from the Gaelic nobility of Ireland, Mo Chua founded Feara-rois monastery in Monaghan, before traveling in 616, at the age of thirty-five, to Connaught, where he lived as a hermit in a stone cell. Eochaidh Minnech, the Chief of the Name of the Clan Fiachra, found him there, and gave him the land to found a monastery, calling him 'Mochua of the narrow prison.' The ruins of the Balla monastery, and the later Balla Round Tower, still remain on the location.

Different accounts claimed that Mo Chua lived at Balla for either twenty-one or thirty-one years, before dying on 30 March 637. The Catholic Church therefore celebrates his feast day on 30 March, although the Acta Sanctorum erroneously lists it as 1 January.

== Legend ==
A number of miracles and heroic acts are attributed to Mo Chua, who is in large part a legendary figure.

According to one story, a woman came to Mo Chua during his education in Bangor, intending to ask him to pray for her to have children. When she found him absorbed in prayer and weeping, she caught his tears in her hand, drank them, and obtained her desire.

In another story, Mo Chua was guided by a miraculous moving holy well from Bangor to Ross Darbrech, passing on the way through Gael, Fore, Tech Telle, Hy Many, Lough Cime, and Ros Dairbhreach, where it stopped and was at once surrounded by a wall of massive stones, forming the Balla Round Tower.

Mo Chua supposedly once encountered two mighty women named Bee and Lithben, who transported passengers over a dangerous creek in a basket, and converted and baptized both them and their fathers.

Other legendary exploits of Mo Chua include piercing a mountain to bring water from Lough Leane to a mill in Fore, transferring the yellow color of the Yellow Plague to his crozier (winning him the title of Bachall Buidhe, 'Yellow Crozier'), defeating a monster in Lough Cime, and shaking his crozier to create a bridge over Lough Conn connecting Inishlee Island to the mainland.
