= Balla, County Mayo =

Balla Balla
- Village
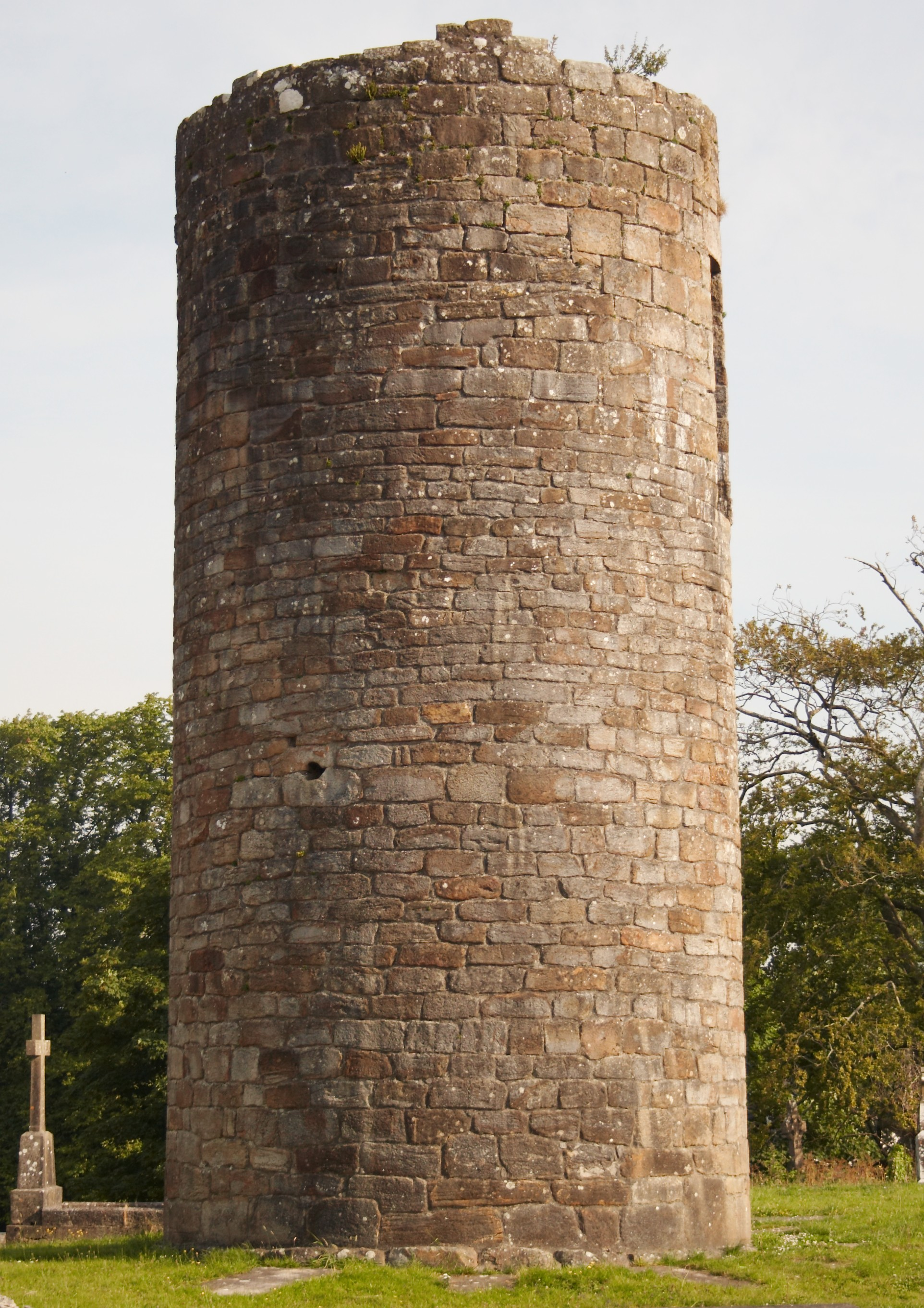
- Balla Round Tower

- Location in Ireland
- Coordinates: 53°48′18″N 9°07′42″W
- Country: Ireland
- Province: Connacht
- County: County Mayo
- Elevation: 37 m (121 ft)

Population (2016)
  - Total: 769
- Time zone: UTC+0 (WET)
  - Summer (DST): UTC-1 (IST (WEST))
- Irish Grid Reference: M255844

Balla (pronounced Baal) (Irish: Balla, meaning 'wall') is a village in County Mayo, Ireland on the N60 National secondary road, the main road between Castlebar and Claremorris. The economy of the village survives mainly on passing trade, from the busy N60 which carries over 7,000 vehicles through the village every day. It is notable for its round tower. The village is in a townland and civil parish of the same name. It used to be a significant shop and market centre. It fell into decline and lost its railway station, but has enjoyed something of a revival as a residential area for people working in Castlebar.

In early times the village was known as 'Ros Dairbhreach', meaning 'The Height of the Oak Wood'. The continuing importance of the oak to the local community is reflected in the appropriately named "Dawn Oak 2000" project. At the beginning of the 21st century, 2000 oak trees were planted, creating a new wood in Balla's Town Park.

== Name ==
According to Adrian Room in A Dictionary of Irish Placenames, the name refers to the Tobar Mhuire, known in English as the Blessed Well, i.e., of the Blessed Virgin Mary) to the west of Balla. This was enclosed by a wall in the 7th century, traditionally by Saint Mo Chua.

== History ==
The founder of the local monastery appears to have been Mo Chua. Tradition has it that Saint Patrick himself had rested in Balla.

Much of the lands around Balla were in possession of the Moores of Brees but transferred on the marriage of Mary Moore to Sir Henry Lynch and were from then under the ownership of the Lynch-Blosse baronets. Atahavallie House, was built by Sir Robert Lynch Blosse (1784-1818), possibly on the site of an earlier house near the village around 1808-10.

Pat Nally (1857–1891), an athlete and member of the Supreme Council of the Irish Republican Brotherhood, was born in Rockstown House near Balla. The P.W. Nally monument, a Celtic Cross, was erected in Balla with the aid of a public subscription, and was unveiled in 1900 by Mark F. Ryan.

William Hamilton Maxwell (1792–1850), a Church of Ireland rector in Balla, wrote Wild Sports of the West while resident there in the 19th century.

== Transport ==
Balla railway station opened on 17 December 1862, but closed to passenger traffic on 17 June 1963, and closed altogether on 2 December 1974.

== Sport ==
Balla GAA is the village's main sports club. Manulla FC is the local soccer club.

== Annalistic references ==
See Annals of Inisfallen.

- AI693.1Kl. Repose of Crónán of Balla, and of Udríne, bishop of Mag Bile. [AU 694].

== See also ==
- List of towns and villages in Ireland
