= Balla railway station =

Railway station in Ireland

Balla

General information
- Location: Balla, County Mayo; Ireland
- Coordinates: 53.7952°N 9.13085°W
- Elevation: 148 ft (45 m)
- Platforms: 1

Construction
- Structure type: Station & goods shed

History
- Opened: 19 May 1862
- Closed: 15 June 1963
- Original company: Great Northern and Western Railway

Services
Preceding station	Disused railways	Following station
Claremorris	Midland Great Western Railway; Dublin-Westport/Ballina	Manulla Junction
Location

Balla railway station served the village of Balla in County Mayo, Ireland from the 1860s until the 1960s.

== History ==
The station was opened, in 1862, by the Great Northern and Western Railway. The station was later nationalised, passing on to the Córas Iompair Éireann as a result of the Transport Act 1944 which took effect from 1 January 1945.

Balla railway station closed in 1963.

Trains on the Dublin Heuston to Westport still pass the site and newspaper reports in December 2021 speculated on a possible reopening of the station in the event of the reopening of the Western Rail Corridor from Galway to Sligo.
