= Balla Round Tower =

- Cloigtheach Bhalla (Irish)
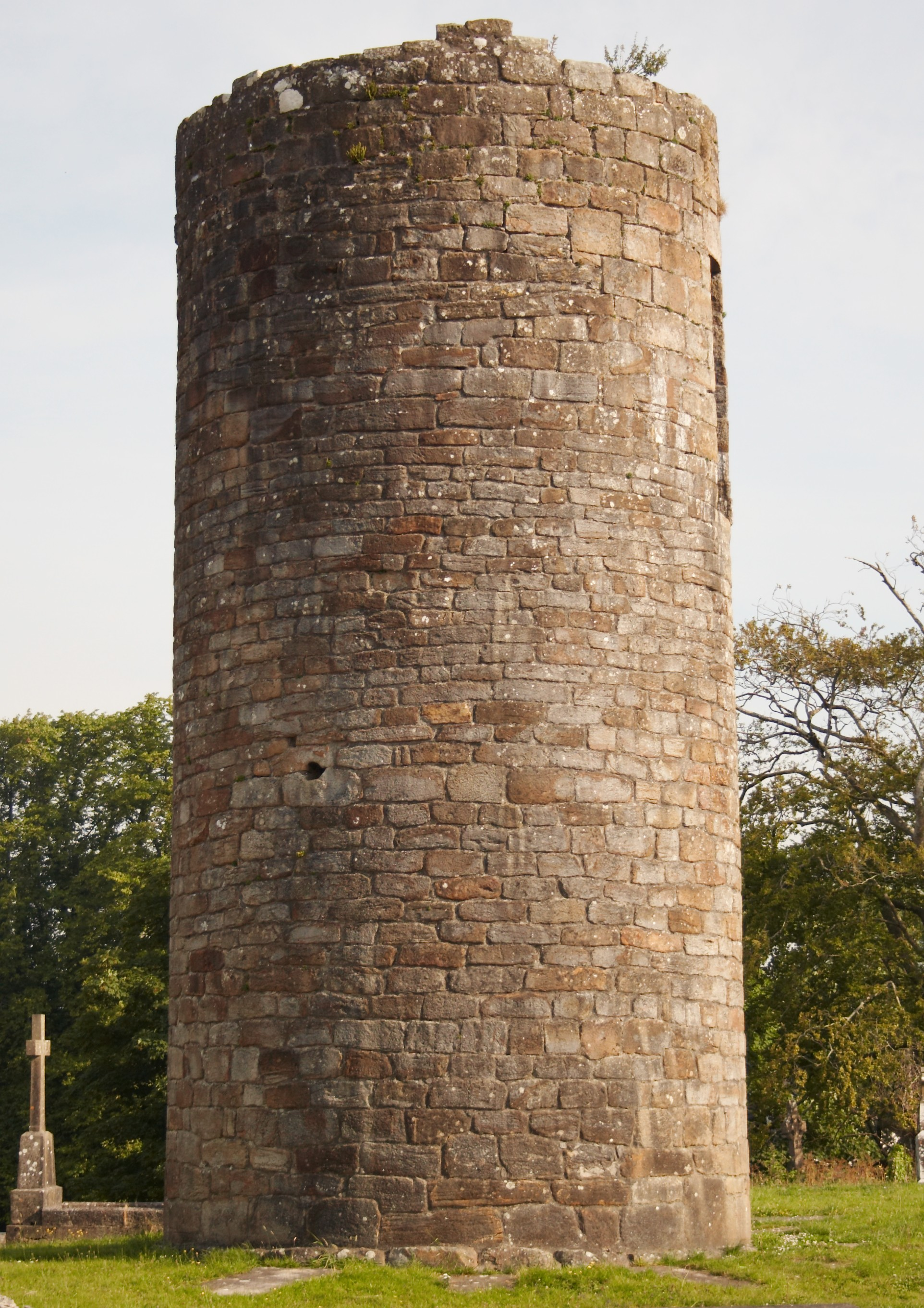
- Southern view

- Location within Ireland
- 53.805085°N 9.131520°W
- Type: Irish round tower
- Location: Balla, County Mayo, Ireland

History
- Built: 12th century

Site notes
- Height: 10 m (33 ft)
- Architectural style: Romanesque

National monument of Ireland
- Official name: Balla Round Tower
- Reference no.: 403

Balla Round Tower is an Irish round tower and National Monument located in County Mayo, Ireland.

== Location ==
Balla Round Tower is located in central Balla, west of the Main Street (part of the N60) on the site of the modern graveyard.

== History ==
A monastery was founded at Balla by Mo Chua of Balla (d. AD 637). The tower is believed to date from the 12th century, judging by the moulding on the lower jambs. The tower was used as a bell-tower in the 19th century.

== Description ==
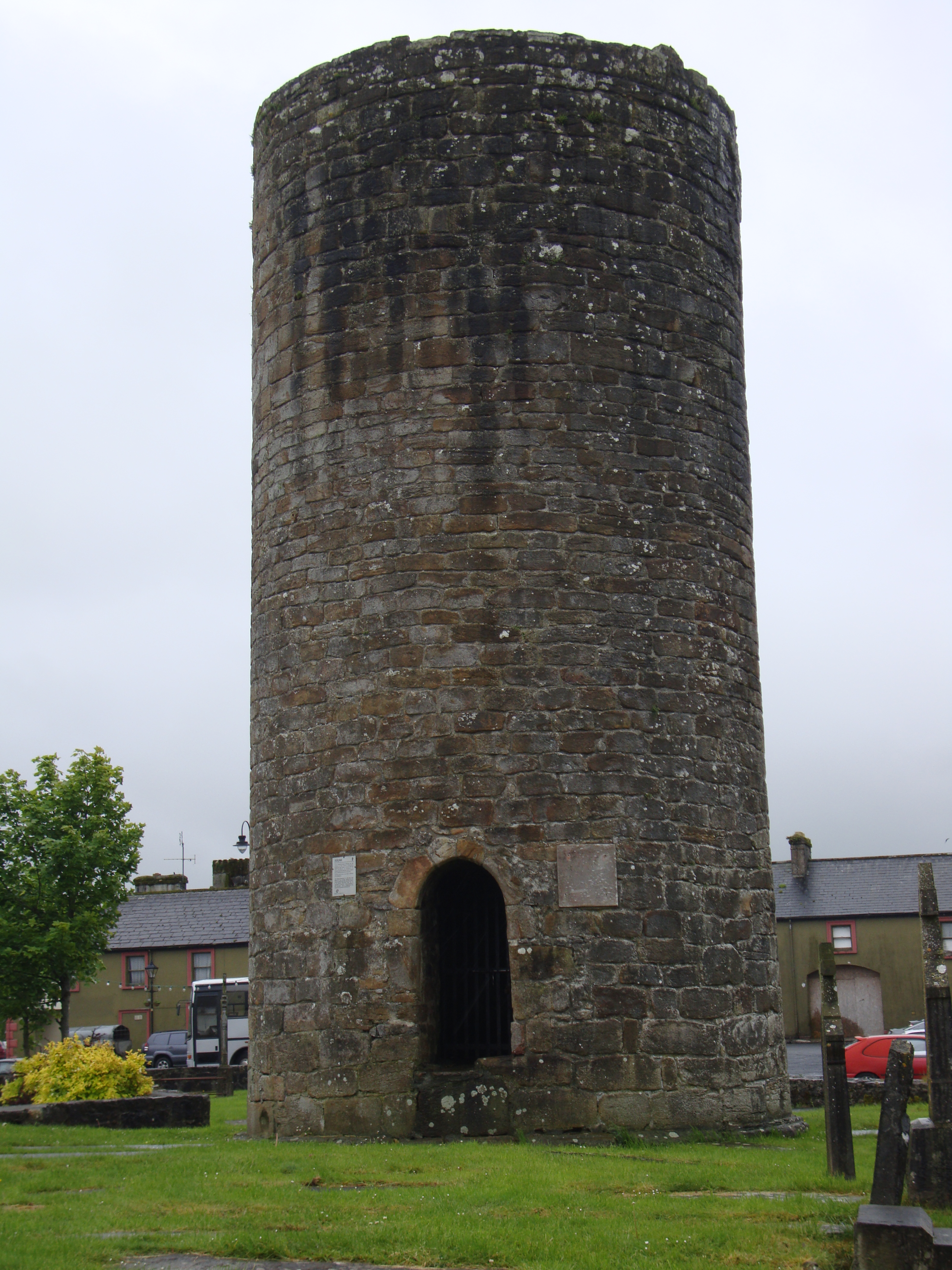
North view

Balla Round Tower was built with red and brown coursed sandstone, and the lower three stories survive. There are two doorways: one in the east 6.5 m (21 ft) up, and an arched north-facing lower down doorway – probably a later insertion. There is only one window, in the south of the tower. The lintel of the east door reused an old cross slab, and two bullaun stones are built into the base.
