= Roscam =

Medieval ecclesiastical site in Galway, Ireland

- Ros Cam
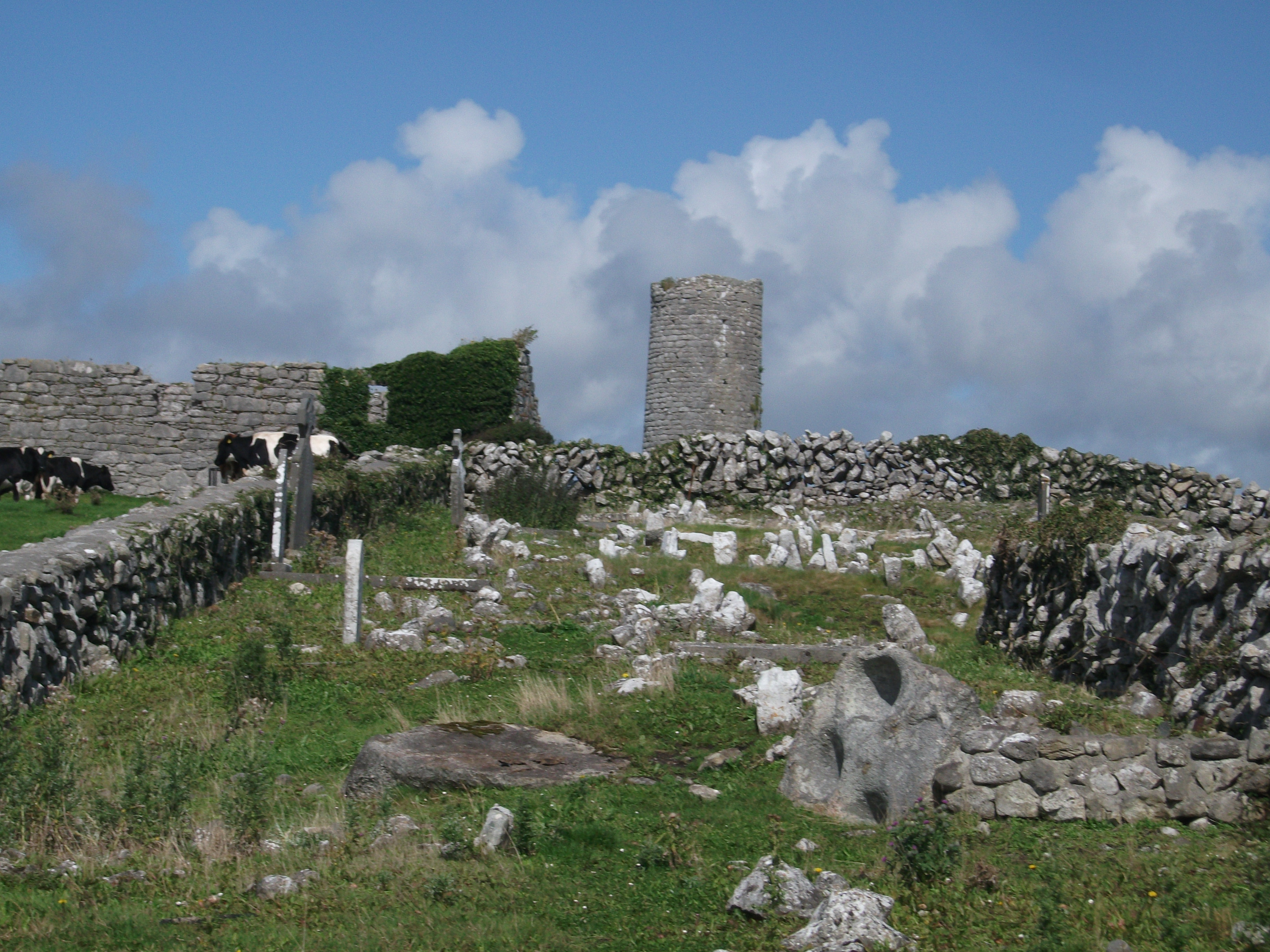

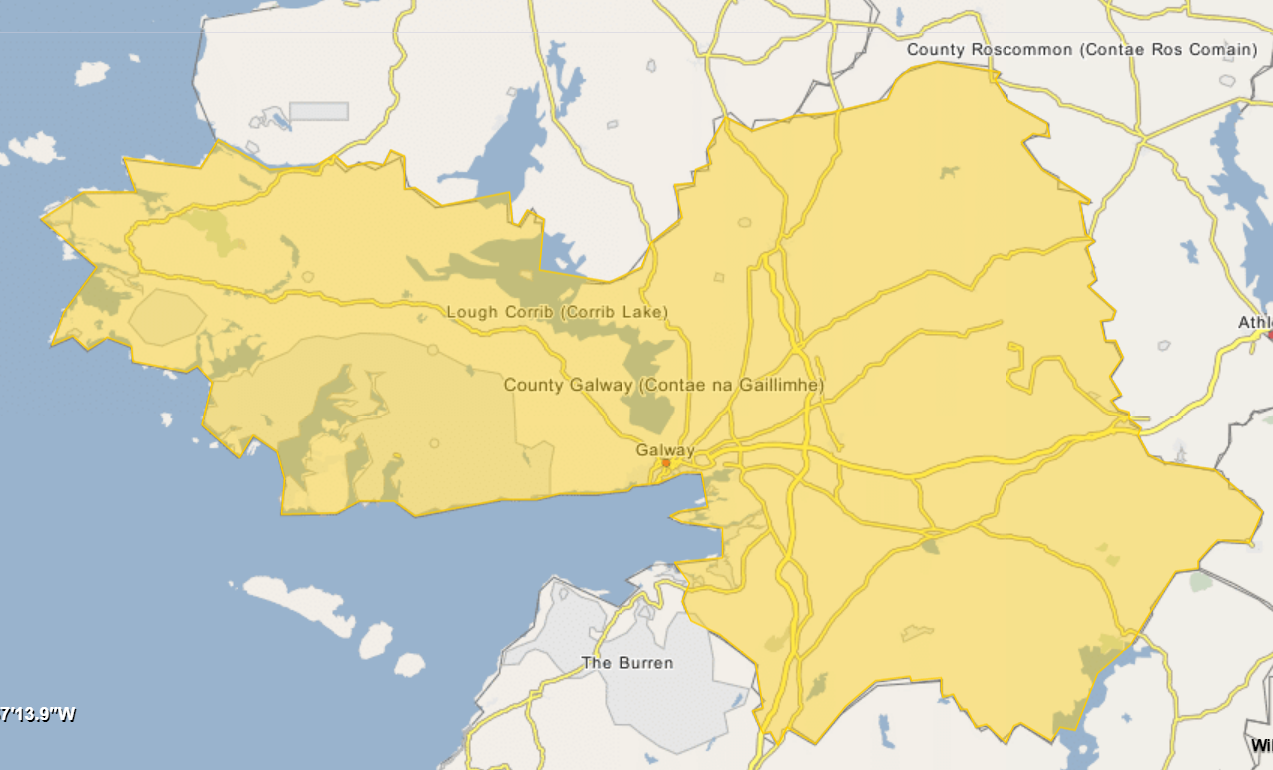
- Location within County Galway
- Interactive map of Roscam

Monastery information
- Other names: Ros-chaim; Ros-camm
- Established: 5th century AD
- Diocese: Galway, Kilmacduagh and Kilfenora

Architecture
- Status: ruined
- Style: Celtic

Site
- Location: Roscam, Galway
- Coordinates: 53.264423°N 8.984974°W
- Visible remains: Church, bullauns and round tower
- Public access: yes

Roscam is a medieval ecclesiastical site and National Monument located in Galway, Ireland.

== Location ==
Roscam is located 4 km (2.5 mi) east of the Galway city centre, immediately north of Oranmore Bay. It is just to the south of the Galway neighbourhood of Roscam, which takes its name from the site.

== History ==
Roscam stands on the site of a very early (5th century) monastery, with legend linking it to Saint Patrick. It was also associated with Odran, a brother of Ciarán of Clonmacnoise (6th century). The 6th-century Saint Aedus (Aidus) transferred the bones of Brión mac Echach Muigmedóin to Roscam. It was attacked by Vikings in AD 807.

The round tower is dated to the 11th century and appears to have never been completed. The ruined tower once marked the limit of O'Halloran (Ó hAllmhuráin, Clann Fhearghaile) territory.

The church was built in the 15th century.

Roscam is said to have been used as a duelling site in the medieval era; at the time, it was well outside of what was then the city of Galway and was easily accessible by boat.

== Ruins and monuments ==
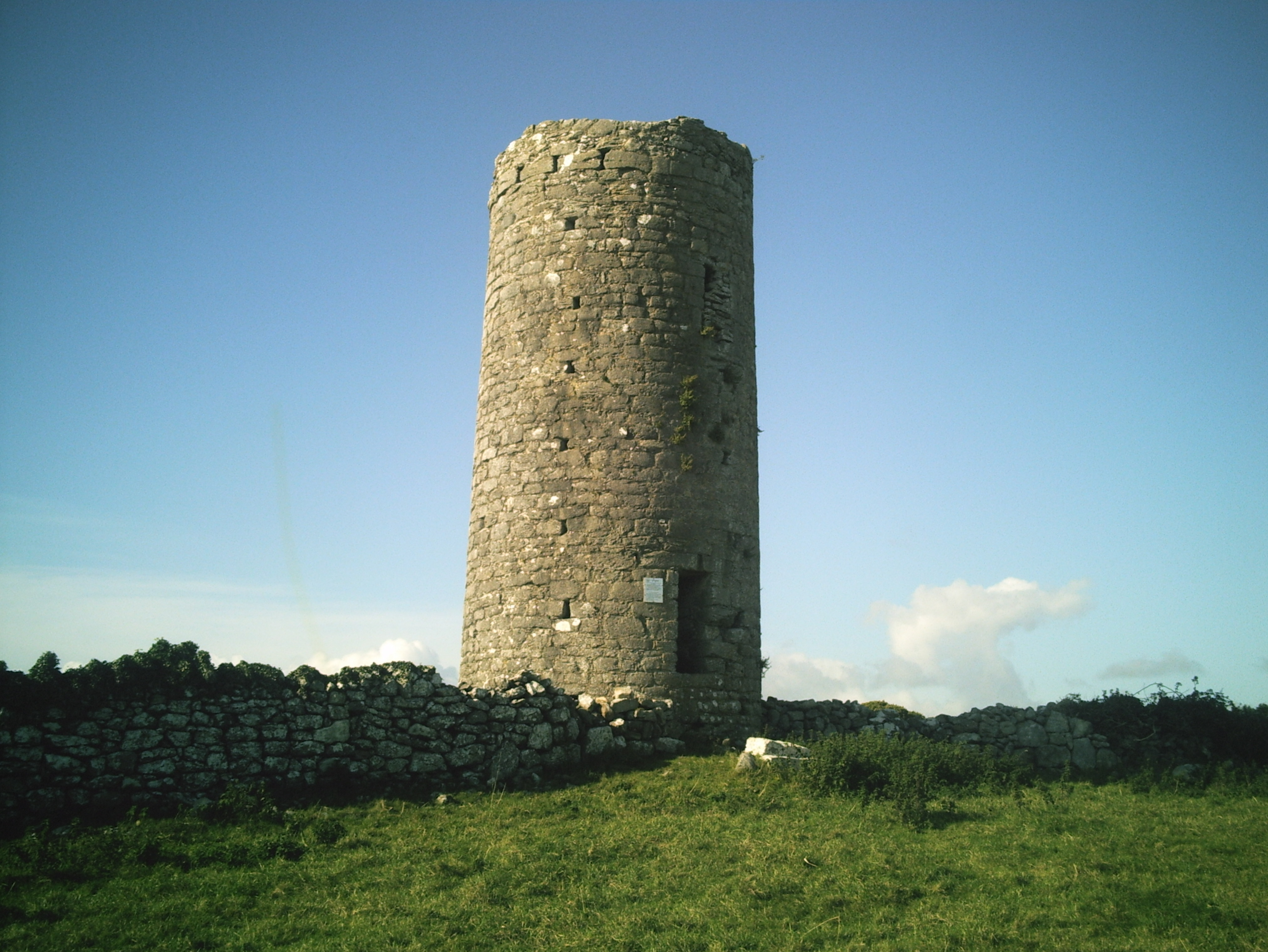
The tower

There is a limestone round tower (11 m (36 ft) tall), bullauns and a church 22 m (72 ft) in length. The whole site is surrounded by a large enclosure.
