= Chaine Memorial =

Lighthouse in Northern Ireland

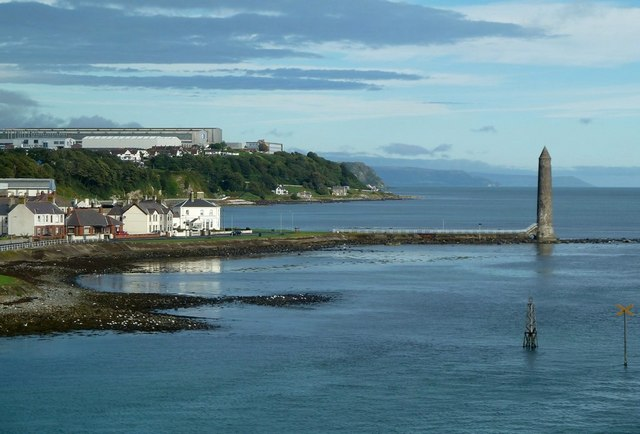
Looking towards Chaine Memorial Tower and north along the Antrim Coast from a ferry entering Larne harbour

The Chaine Memorial Tower in Larne, County Antrim, Northern Ireland, is a memorial to James Chaine, a former Member of Parliament for Antrim, who died in 1885. It is a cylindrical stone tower lighthouse with a conical roof, situated on the west side of entrance to Larne Lough.

Chaine developed Larne's short sea route to Scotland as well as establishing the town as a transatlantic port. The memorial, built in 1888, by public subscription, is a replica of an Irish round tower. The memorial is situated at the mouth of Larne harbour, and is reached via Chaine Memorial Road. There is access from Curran Road via Bay Road.

== Plaque ==
The inscription on the plaque adorning the monument is as follows:

"....contributions of every class in this mixed community irrespective of creed or party, all cordially united in esteem and affection for the Memory of JAMES CHAINE of Ballycraigy and Cairncastle Co. Antrim who represented this County in the Imperial Parliament of Great Britain and Ireland from February 1874 till 4 May 1885 when his early and lamented death in his 44th year of his age deprived his native County of one who had worked indefatigably for its interests especially in developing and improving the natural capabilities of the harbour of Larne and establishing its connection with Great Britain, the United States of America and with the inland parts of this County."

== Lighthouse ==
Chain Tower Sandy Point
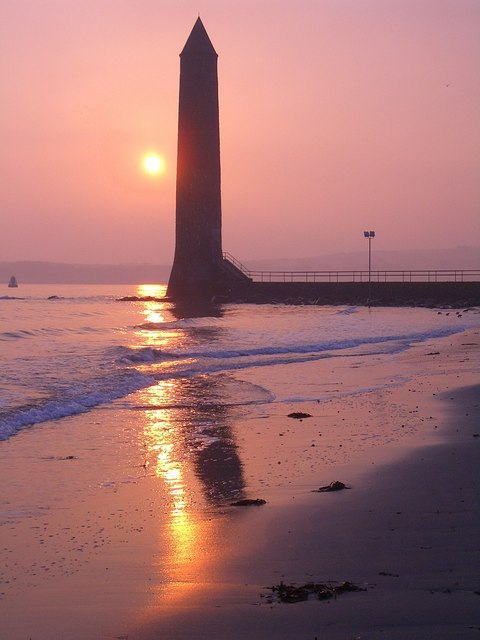
- The tower at sunrise from Sandy Bay.
- Location: Larne; County Antrim; Northern Ireland
- Coordinates: 54.854538°N 5.797976°W

Tower
- Constructed: 1888
- Construction: Annalong granite tower
- Height: 23 metres (75 ft)
- Shape: slim cylindrical tower with conical roof and light shown through a window
- Markings: unpainted tower
- Power source: mains electricity
- Operator: Commissioners of Irish Lights
- Heritage: Grade B1 listed building

Light
- First lit: 1899
- Focal height: 23 metres (75 ft)
- Range: 16 nmi (30 km; 18 mi) (white), 12 nmi (22 km; 14 mi) (red)
- Characteristic: Iso WR 5s.

In 1885, the Memorial Committee for Chaine sought the assistance of the Commissioners of Irish Lights to help to build and maintain a tower, but they initially refused. Eventually it was agreed the Memorial Committee would build the replica round tower, without a light, at Sandy Point Bay, and the Larne Harbour authority would maintain it. The approved tower was completed in January 1888.

In 1896 it was suggested that a light be added to the tower. As a result, the Commissioners of Irish Lights took over the tower and on 1 July 1899, an oil powered navigational light was installed 22 metres up the tower (the tower being 28 metres in height). The light was installed to aid the navigation of the Hunter Rock, a submerged rock approximately 5 miles off shore. The light was de-manned and converted to coal gas from the Larne mains gas supply in 1905, before finally being converted to electric in September 1935. During April 1948 the supply was changed from DC to AC.

Responsibility for maintaining the light now falls under the remit of the attending keeper at Ferris Point Lighthouse on the other side of the harbour.
