= Fobar =

Malagasy football club

- Full name: FC Fobar
- Ground: Toliara Stadium; Toliara, Madagascar
- League: THB Champions League

Fobar is a Malagasy football club based in Toliara, Madagascar.

The team plays in the Malagasy Second Division.

In 1995 the team has won the THB Champions League.

== Achievements ==
- THB Champions League: 1

1995

== Performance in CAF competitions ==
- CAF Champions League: 1appearance

1996 African Cup of Champions Clubs
