= Meelick, County Mayo =

Meelick Míleac
- Village
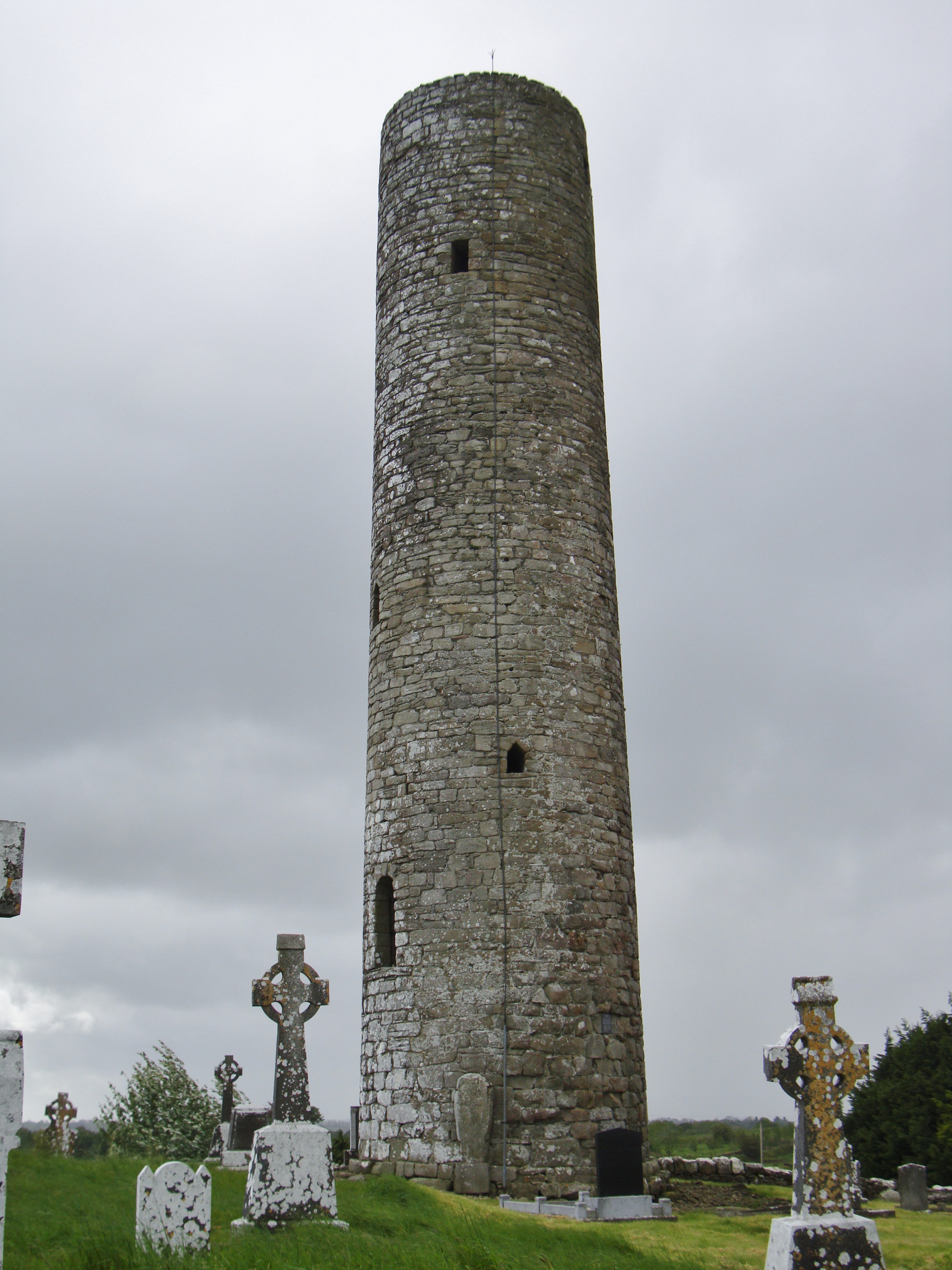
- Meelick Round Tower

- Location in Ireland
- Coordinates: 53°55′54″N 9°01′17″W
- Country: Ireland
- Province: Connacht
- County: County Mayo
- Time zone: UTC+0 (WET)
  - Summer (DST): UTC-1 (IST (WEST))

Meelick (Irish: Míleac) is a small village situated some 5 km west-southwest of Swinford in County Mayo, Ireland. It is in a civil parish of the same name.

== Meelick round tower ==
A 21-metre high round tower next to the cemetery is the sole surviving structure of an early monastery. Restored in 1880, the tower is flat-topped, having lost its original bell-storey and cap. It is believed to have been built at some time between AD 923 and 1013 on the site of an ecclesiastical foundation attributed to Saint Broccaidh.

== See also ==
- List of towns and villages in Ireland
