= George Lennox Barrow =

George Lennox Barrow (1921–1989) was a colonial administrator, Irish historian, philosopher, geographer, archaeologist, economist and writer. In the 1970s his name was circulated in the media as academician.

== Biography ==
George Lennox Barrow was the youngest son of Major Ronald Barrow, who was originally from a London-based family of military and property owners. His grandfather, Sir Edmund Barrow was commander of the British section of the expedition force which occupied Peking in 1900. His mother, Cecily Woolsey-Butler was the inheritor of Milestown House, Castlebellingham, Co. Louth, which, through her marriage, the Barrow family inherited.

Lennox was born in the original Milestown in 1921 and went to Cambridge to study history. In 1943 he was called up to military service in the Pacific Islands where the Japanese were beginning to retreat. He described his experience in ‘Jungle-Jangle’- an unpublished account.

After the war, he joined the British Colonial Service and served as administrator on the island of Tana. In 1951, he was transferred to Nigeria where he remained until 1957.

As Nigeria prepared for independence (which was to come in 1960), Lennox and his second wife Viola Molteno, left, returned to Ireland and bought a residence in Sutton Cross, Co. Dublin for £9,000, where they settled for the rest of their lives. They appeared to be perfectly content with each other and required nothing more, as some would say a “perfect marriage”.

Lennox Barrow graduated from the University of London in 1970 with a Doctorate of Philosophy (PhD).

=== Death ===
In the spring of 1988 Lennox was knocked down by a car and was hospitalised. He died after eighteen months. His remains buried on Glasnevin cemetery, Dublin.

== Family life ==
Viola Molteno, who had married Lennox in 1954, was totally at one with him in almost everything. She also yearned for a simple life and they were united in creating a sense of peace. Her first husband had been a soldier in Hong Kong at the time of the Japanese attack and she and their son Robert had been imprisoned in a Japanese camp in the Philippines.

Lennox had previously married Margaret Stevenson, already a widow with two children, Vicky and Derek, who had been recently bereaved. They were married for about two years, finally divorcing acrimoniously in 1953. They had son Ronald, who spent his early life living with his granny in Milestown House.

== Legacy ==
Lennox Barrow has left a huge legacy as an Irish historian, geographer, archaeologist, economist and writer. In his lifetime, he wrote four books: “Jungle - Jangle” – an unpublished account of his wartime service in the Solomon Island. “Glendalough and St Kevin” (1972). “The Emergence of the Irish Banking system (1825 – 45)”. Gill and Macmillan, (1975). “Round Towers of Ireland” Gill & Macmillan, 1979, reprinted by Buvinda Publications, 1994.

=== Lennox Barrow Charitable Foundation ===
Following his father's death, and inheritance of the Lennox Barrow estate, Ronald Barrow decided to establish from part of it a foundation in memory of his father with the sole purpose of helping others. In 1992 a hundred thousand pounds was set up as capital with the purpose of becoming as self-generating investment. Ronald Barrow found a charitable foundation CHY: 10574 in memory of the man who meant a lot to him.

== Publications ==
- Barrow, George L. (1972). Glendalough and St. Kevin.
- —— (1974). The Emergence of the Irish Banking System 1820–45.
- —— (1979). The Round Towers of Ireland: A Study and Gazette. University Press of Ireland. ISBN 0906187443.
